= Antisemitism in South Africa =

Antisemitism in South Africa is the manifestation of hostility, prejudice or discrimination against South African Jews or Judaism as a religious, ethnic or racial group. This form of racism has affected Jews since South Africa's Jewish community was established in the 19th century.

The history of the Jews in South Africa has been marked by periods of official and unofficial antisemitism.

== Before apartheid ==
During the 1930s many Nationalist Party leaders and wide sections of the Afrikaner people came strongly under the influence of the Nazi movement which dominated Germany from 1933. There were many reasons for this. Germany was the traditional enemy of Britain, and whoever opposed Britain appeared a friend of the Nationalists. Many Nationalists, moreover, believed that the opportunity to re-establish their lost republic would come with the defeat of the British Empire in the international arena. The more belligerent Hitler became, the further hopes rose that the day of Afrikanerdom was about to dawn.

In 1930, D. F. Malan introduced the Quota Act, effectively restricting Jewish immigration. The bill, which did not explicitly state to be limiting of Jews, put high restrictions on countries that had majority Jewish immigrants, and did not restrict countries that barely had Jews. Dr. Malan listed three reasons for his support of the Quota Act: "The desire of every nation to maintain its basic racial composition; (2) The doctrine of assimilability; and (3) South Africa's desire to maintain its own 'type' of civilisation". When the Jews protested this, saying it was antisemitic, Dr. Malan responded by saying that the "measure was really in the interests of the present Jewish population" and said that "[it is] very easy to rouse a feeling of hatred towards the Jews in the country ... if they want to hit us they may be assured that we will hit back."

The National Party of Dr. Malan closely associated itself with policies of the Nazis. Jewish immigration from Eastern Europe was controlled under the Aliens Act and came to an end during this period. Although Jews were accorded status as Europeans, they were not accepted into white society. The Kelvin Grove sports club for example had an exclusive Europeans Only and No Jews policy. Some 11 such sports clubs had similar policies. Many Jews lived in mixed race areas such as District Six, from where they were forcibly removed to make way for a whites-only development. The architect of grand apartheid Hendrick Verwoerd studied in Germany where he obtained a degree in psychology. Many of the apartheid eugenics programmes that targeted native Africans can be said to have been inspired by racist theories which dominated the campuses of the time, as evidenced by the use of Nazi race indexing tools.

In 1936, Verwoerd joined a deputation of six professors in protesting against the admission to South Africa of Jewish refugees from Nazi Germany. "Following these demands of the Nationalist Party, Eric Louw, later Foreign Minister, introduced another antisemitic bill that strongly resembled Nazi legislation – the Aliens Amendment and Immigration Bill of 1939. His bill was a means of suppressing all Jews. This bill suggested that Jews threatened to overpower Protestants in the business world and were innately cunning and manipulative and that Jews were a danger to society. To support his claim, Louw maintained that Jews were involved in the Bolshevik Revolution and therefore intended to spread Communism worldwide. This bill defined Jews as anyone with parents who were at least partly Jewish regardless of actual religious faith or practices."

Another organisation with which the Nationalists found much in common during the 1930s was the 'South African Gentile National Socialist Movement', headed by one Johannes von Strauss von Moltke, whose object was to combat and destroy the alleged 'perversive influence of the Jews in economics, culture, religion, ethics, and statecraft and to re-establish European Aryan control in South Africa for the welfare of the Christian peoples of South Africa'.

== Apartheid era ==
The 1956 Treason Trial saw Nelson Mandela along with a group of mostly Jewish men and women, arrested for treason. This resulted in accusations of a Jewish conspiracy to overthrow the white government and a plot involving communism. The group of Jews included Joe Slovo, Ruth First, Ben Turok, Leon Levy and Lionel Bernstein. They escaped conviction only to face another trial in 1960 known as the Rivonia Trial. This larger trial included the Zionist Arthur Goldreich, Denis Goldberg, Harold Wolpe, James Kantor and Lionel Bernstein.

During the 1960s, Sir Oswald Mosley, the British fascist leader, was a frequent visitor to South Africa, where he was received by the Prime Minister and other members of the Cabinet. At one time Mosley had two functioning branches of his organisation in South Africa, and one of his supporters, Derek Alexander, was stationed in Johannesburg as his main agent.

Upon Verwoerd's assassination in 1966, BJ Vorster was elected by the National Party to replace him. Vorster had been a supporter of Hitler during WWII; his policy towards Jews in his own country, however, was ambivalent.

The 1980s saw the rise of far-right neo-Nazi groups such as the Afrikaner Weerstandsbeweging under Eugene Terreblanche. The AWB modeled itself after Hitler's National Socialist Party replete with fascist regalia and an emblem resembling the swastika.

There were numerous similarities between the laws passed by the Nazis against German Jews and the laws passed by the Afrikaner Nationalists against the Blacks. The scholar Sipo Elijah Mzimela observed similarities in theology between the "role of the Deutsche Christen and the Dutch Reformed Church, on the one hand, and that of the Confessing Church and the English-speaking Churches on the other". This is known as the "apartheid heresy" controversy which became important in the struggle against institutional racism in South Africa.

== Post Apartheid era ==
In May 1998, a Cape community radio station run by a Muslim organisation and aimed at Muslims, Radio 786 broadcast a programme denying the Holocaust. The resulting legal action brought by the South African Jewish Board of Deputies remains unresolved after 14 years. Radio 786 refuses to apologise to the Jewish community and has stood by its version of events.

In 2009, South Africa's deputy foreign minister Fatima Hajaig claimed that "Jewish money controls America and most Western countries." Her comments prompted criticism by Foreign Minister Nkosazana Dlamini-Zuma and a reported "dressing down" by then President Kgalema Motlanthe. Subsequently, Hajaig apologised on two separate occasions for her remarks.

In 2013, ANC Western Cape leader Marius Fransman claimed ninety-eight percent of land and property owners in Cape Town are "white" and "Jewish". The allegation turned out to be false.

During the Rhodes Must Fall protests, President of the Students' Representative Council of the University of the Witwatersrand Mcebo Dlamini, who was leader of the protests, stated he "loved" Hitler because Hitler "knew" that Jews "were up to no good", admired Hitler's "charisma" and claimed that "Jews are devils" and were "uncircumcised in heart". His comments were denounced by the South African Jewish Board of deputies, but were supported by the Rhodes Must Fall movement.

During the debate on Friday, 23 February 2018, Sharon Davids, a member of the ANC provincial legislature, said: "Premier Helen Zille is too much in love with the Jewish mafia". The DA "fabricated" the Day Zero water crisis in Cape Town to gain kickbacks from the Jewish mafia, claimed Davids, adding that former leader Tony Leon was hired to communicate the party's "doomsday message" of Day Zero and that "Zille had it in for Patricia [de Lille] after she stood up to her about this land in the Jewish area". Proof that the DA was favouring Jewish people, said Davids, was illustrated by party leader Mmusi Maimane "hanging out" with DA MP Michael Bagraim, who had spent time on the SA Jewish Board of Deputies.

In 2020, there was an unprecedented conviction for online antisemitism in the country. The Magistrates Court in Randburg found Matome Letsoalo guilty of crimen injuria over incendiary tweets targeting the South African Jewish Board of Deputies (SAJBD).

When the Israel–Hamas war started in October 2023, Jewish organizations in South Africa reported an increase in antisemitic incidents. The South African Jewish Board of Deputies said it recorded 139 incidents between October and December 2023, most of them verbal, compared with a significantly lower number during the same period the previous year. The board also recorded six physical attacks in 2023, the highest number in its survey. Rabbi Moshe Silberhaft, reported that he had been subjected to antisemitic abuse at a Jewish cemetery in the Free State province, where men in a passing car told him to go back to Israel.

== See also ==
- Israel–South Africa relations
