= Moshe Silberhaft =

"The Travelling Rabbi" Moshe Silberhaft
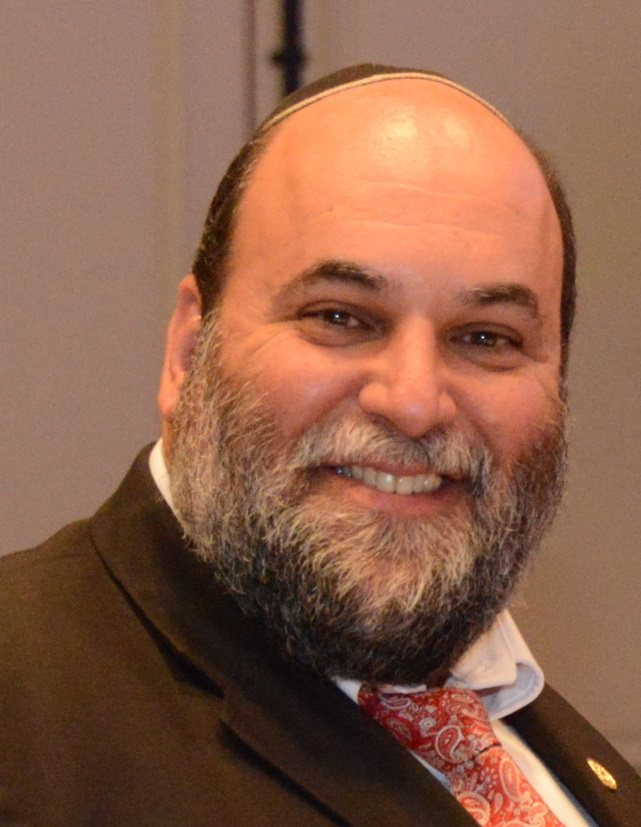

Personal details
- Born: Moshe Silberhaft; 17 November 1967 (age 58) Jerusalem, Israel
- Children: Yosef and Leah
- Parent(s): Israel and Gita Silberhaft
- Semicha: Rabbinical Ecclesiastical Court of Jerusalem
- Website: www.africanjewishcongress.com

Moshe Silberhaft (born 17 November 1967) is an Orthodox Rabbi who serves as the Spiritual Leader and CEO: African Jewish Congress, Botswana, DRC, Kenya, Lesotho, Madagascar, Mauritius, Mozambique, Namibia, South Africa, Swaziland, Uganda, Zambia & Zimbabwe; Rabbi to South African Country Communities, South African Jewish Board of Deputies. He is also known as "The Travelling Rabbi".

== Early life ==
Silberhaft was born in Jerusalem, Israel in 1967, the son of Israel and Gita Silberhaft, and has two children, Yosef and Leah.

== Education ==
Yeshiva College, Johannesburg, South Africa.

Yeshiva Gedolah - Lubuvitch, South Africa

Rabbinic ordinance - Rabbinical Ecclesiastical Court of Jerusalem

2006 - An Alumni and Fellow of the Nahum Goldmann Fellowship for Jewish Leadership – United States of America.

== Military service ==
1988-1989 Served as the Jewish Chaplin in the South African Defense Forces and spent 6 months on the South-West African - Angolan border, ministering to the Jewish National Servicemen.

== Appointment ==
1993 - Appointed as 7TH Spiritual Leader to the Country Communities Department of the South African Jewish Board of Deputies (SAJBD). The SAJBD are the only organization in SA who run an active Country Communities Department, which is responsible to well over 2500 Jews spread across the face of South Africa. It is also responsible for the regular maintenance & upkeep of over 225 Jewish cemeteries comprising more than 30 000 graves in many of the small towns where Jews once lived.

1997 - Appointed as the 1ST Spiritual Leader & CEO to the African Jewish Congress, which is responsible for the Jewish communities of; Botswana – Democratic Republic of Congo (Zaire) – Kenya – Lesotho – Madagascar – Mauritius – Mozambique – Namibia – South Africa – Swaziland – Uganda – Zambia & Zimbabwe.

2007 - Appointed President – African Jewish Congress Zimbabwe Fund.

2008 - Appointed Consultant – South African Friends of Beth Hatefutsoth.

2010 - Appointed Trustee – “Chief Rabbi CK Harris Memorial Foundation”.

2014 - Appointed Southern African Representative - Heavenly Culture, World Peace and Restoration of Light and International Peace Youth Group.

2015 - Appointed co-Regional Director of the Commonwealth Jewish Council for the Africa region.

== Publications ==
2013 - Published “The Travelling Rabbi – My African Tribe” – a book that traces the journeys of Rabbi Silberhaft, highlighting the people he meets and records their stories, sometimes humorous, often tragic but always fascinating and remembers Jewish communities and personalities who would otherwise have been forgotten.

== Documentaries ==
2003 – South African Broadcast Corporation, Chanel 2, Production of documentary – “The Travelling Rabbi”.

The following links to the YouTube Videos:

Part 1: https://www.youtube.com/watch?v=ILtlmSp4-gc

Part 2: https://www.youtube.com/watch?v=QlBu6M50wUc

Part 3: https://www.youtube.com/watch?v=POhDtcGWmmM

On the 13 November 2011 The South African Broadcast Corporation (SABC) Channel 2, screened a documentary on South Africa's ‘Travelling Rabbi’. Entitled ‘Shalom, the Beloved Country’, it was aired on the station's Issues of Faith program at 09h00. According to a pre-publicity release, it “explores the challenges faced by Jews in small country communities, and captures Rabbi Moshe Silberhaft's warm and strong relationships with communities that once boasted thriving Jewish populations”.

A team from the SABC accompanied Rabbi Moshe on his pastoral work in the North West, Free State, Western Cape, and Bulawayo, where the Rabbi opened a library (the Rabbi Moshe Library) for schoolchildren in a suburb of the city.

The documentary shows various aspects of the Rabbi's duties, including conducting services, visiting abandoned synagogues, seeing to the maintenance of Jewish cemeteries and, most important of all, providing a direct connection with the few Jews who still remain on the platteland. Also shown is Rabbi Silberhaft's interacting with members of other faiths and communities, in which respect he acts as the public face of South African Jewry as a whole.

The following are the links to the five part program “Shalom the Beloved Country” produced by the SABC television network about the work of Rabbi Silberhaft:

Part 1: https://www.youtube.com/watch?v=f8eyQySqPpU

Part 2: https://www.youtube.com/watch?v=N50AfIWdGYQ

Part 3: https://www.youtube.com/watch?v=C8p9cIx-kxQ

Part 4: https://www.youtube.com/watch?v=E3LWZgszmw8

Part 5: https://www.youtube.com/watch?v=iuE1TbC6NXM

In 2006 another documentary with the title “Ancient and Modern Methods of the Travelling Rabbi” – the Maintenance of Jewish Diasporal identity, was produced.

== Awards ==
- 2011- The Jewish Report, Community Service Award - ABSA Jewish Achievers Gala Dinner
- 2009 - 25th Anniversary Award Dinner - Commonwealth Jewish Council and Trust
