= Adath Yeshurun (Johannesburg) =

Orthodox Jewish synagogue in South Africa

Religion
- Affiliation: Orthodox Judaism
- Ecclesiastical or organisational status: Synagogue
- Leadership: Rabbi Moshe Chaim Salzer
- Year consecrated: 1936; 1999
- Status: Active

Location
- Location: 5 Summerway, Fairmount, Johannesburg
- Country: South Africa
- Interactive map of Adath Yeshurun
- Coordinates: 26.147°S 28.103°E

Adath Yeshurun (previously Adath Jeshurun), is an Orthodox Jewish congregation and synagogue. The congregation was established by German Jewish migrants in 1936 in Yeoville, an inner-city suburb which became a significant Jewish enclave in the twentieth century. In 1970, the congregation established Kollel Yad Shaul. The congregation subsequently relocated to Fairmount, near Glenhazel in 1999.

== History ==
The congregation was established in 1936 in Yeoville, an increasingly Jewish inner-city area of Johannesburg. The congregation was established by German Jewish migrants, who mostly arrived between 1933 and 1937, fleeing Nazi Germany. The founders were adherents of the neo-orthodox tradition founded by rabbi Samson Raphael Hirsch in the mid-nineteenth century in Frankfurt. This tradition opposed the burgeoning Reform Judaism, while advocating for full civic integration of Jewry and participation in the professions, as well as retaining adherence to halakha. The tradition was isolationist in nature, separating itself from the Jewish mainstream. Thus, the Yeoville congregation remained a largely self-contained religious community until the mid-1960s.

The congregation operated without an appointed rabbi for the first seventeen years, with services mostly led by a medical doctor, Dr. Fritz Homburger, from Frankfurt.

Bratislava-born Yaacov Salzer came from Israel in 1953 to serve the community as its first rabbi. Salzer remained as the spiritual leader of the community until his death in 1980. Salzer became a respected authority beyond his congregation on questions of halakha.

The congregation declined offers to affiliate with the Federation of Orthodox Synagogues. The Federation's monthly, the Federation Chronicle sharply criticised the congregation for its application to establish its own ritual slaughter, shehita in 1959. In an editorial, the chronicle wrote: "To listen to them, one would think that they have the sole monopoly of the Jewish religion and that in their hands lie the keys to heaven and Gan Eden (The Garden of Eden)." Rabbi Salzer rebuffed the criticism and defended the principles of the neo-Orthodox tradition, stating that the congregation "taught South Africa's Jewry that one can stand on both feet in life, being a businessman, a clerk, a student, a typist, having any trade or profession and yet keep up everything which is holy and dear to Judaism", adding that the congregation had "smashed the legend" that it was not possible to carry out the commandments of the Torah in Africa.

The congregation became decidedly less insular from the 1960s amid rising public appetite for Jewish education. Its rigorous Talmud Torah school welcomed religious families that were not affiliated with the congregation. The school departed from other day schools in that it offered a more demanding standard of religious education. In 1966, the congregation established Yeshivas Toras Emes, a boys' high school. This was followed by Beth Yaakov, a girls' high school ten years later.

In 1970, the congregation founded a Kollel, and the first of its kind in South Africa. Kollel Yad Shaul first began as a nucleus, mostly attracting young religious men England. It had an outsize impact on Johannesburg's Orthodox Jewish community, with Rabbi Norman Bernard describing it as "like water hitting parched soil."

The Jewish and broader white population of Yeoville began to decline in the 1970s, and this white flight accelerated in the early to mid 1990s, with most residents migrating to the northern suburbs. The congregation relocated to Fairmount, near Glenhazel in 1999.

At a gala dinner in honour of the congregation in 2002, Chief Rabbi Cyril Harris praised the congregation as a "quite unique and admirable kehilla," praising it for raising the flag of Yiddishkeit in the city and for driving Torah education. Rabbi Harris concluded: "We are saluting a pivotal congregation in our community that has sown fruit beyond the confines of their own kehilla,"

== See also ==
- History of the Jews in South Africa
- List of synagogues in South Africa
