= Kollel Bet Mordechai =

Kollel and bet midrash in South Africa

Kollel Bet Mordechai (The Beit Mordechai Campus Kollel) is a kollel and bet midrash in Johannesburg, South Africa. It is associated with Mizrachi and is based at the Yeshiva College of South Africa.

The Kollel facilitates advanced, as well as community Torah learning on a daily basis. Advanced yeshiva studies in its kollel include daily shiurim in Talmud with Rishonim, and in halacha. Several Kollel members have so far received Semicha; the examination by Rabbi Yaacov Warhaftig of Machon Ariel in Jerusalem. Community focused activities range from individualised chavruta-based study to public shiurim. Daf yomi is offered three times daily, with a weekly "overview" for Women; Mishnah Berurah Yomit and Tzurba M’Rabanan are also offered.

The Kollel is headed jointly by Rabbi Nechemya Taylor and Rabbi Levy Wineberg (previously Rosh Yeshiva of the Rabbinical College of Pretoria); previously Rabbi Dr. Shlomo Glicksberg jointly headed the Kollel, assuming the role from Rabbi Avraham Amitai in September 2014. It was originally led by Rabbi Doron Podlashuk, with Rabbi Simcha Krauss as acting Rosh Kollel.

== See also ==
- Jewish education in South Africa under History of the Jews in South Africa
- Orthodox yeshivas in South Africa
- Yeshiva of Cape Town
