= Rabbinical College of South Africa =

The Rabbinical College of South Africa is a Chabad Yeshiva based in Sydenham, Johannesburg. It was established in c. 2021, and is headed by Rabbi Levi Wineberg, also joint Rosh Kollel of Kollel Bet Mordechai, and internationally known for his annotated translation of Tanya. Rabbi Mendy Shishler is Mashpia.

The yeshiva offers a three-year program, covering Talmud, Halakha (Jewish Law) and Chassidus (philosophy), per the ethos and structure of Tomchei Temimim. It also hosts a kollel for advanced students, and may extend to a fourth year for Semikha (ordination). Students can also opt for parallel courses in Safrus and Shechitah.

== See also ==
- Jewish education in South Africa under History of the Jews in South Africa
- Orthodox yeshivas in South Africa
- Rabbinical College of Pretoria
- Lubavitch Yeshiva Gedolah of Johannesburg
- Torah Academy School, Johannesburg
- Tomchei Temimim
