= Yeshivah Gedolah of Johannesburg =

Yeshivah in Johannesburg, South Africa

Coordinates: 26.135975°S 28.095344°E

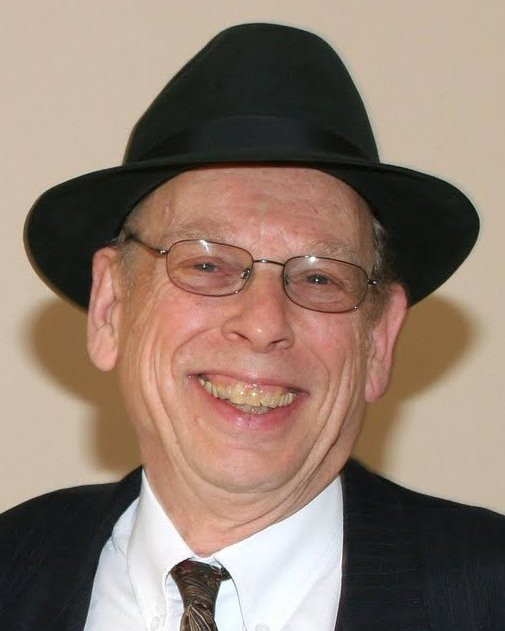
Rabbi Azriel Goldfein, founder of Yeshivah Gedolah of Johannesburg

Yeshivah Gedolah of Johannesburg was one of the first Yeshivot established in South Africa. Since its founding in 1978, it has played an important - though understated - role in the South African religious community. It was established and headed by Rosh Yeshiva Rabbi Azriel Goldfein until his death in 2007, and is now headed by his sons Rabbi Avraham and Rabbi David Goldfein. It is based in Glenhazel, Johannesburg. It accommodates students from across the spectrum of Orthodoxy. The Hirsch Lyons Primary and High Schools are associated with the Yeshivah.

Rabbi Goldfein studied in Telz Yeshiva, under great rabbis who survived the Holocaust, and was a lifelong talmid muvhak (prominent student) of Rabbi Mordechai Gifter. During this time, he developed a "love of and profound knowledge of" the writings of the Maharal of Prague. With his wife Clarice Goldfein, he came to South Africa from the United States in 1972, "with a mission to establish an authentic, world-class yeshiva... for the training of South African rabbis for South Africa", and "Yeshivah Gedolah" was established the next year, originally based at the Yeshiva College of South Africa.

Rabbi Avraham Goldfein studied at Telz in Cleveland for four years. In addition to studying at the Yeshivah Gedolah under his father, where he received semichah (ordination) he also studied at Yeshivas Netzach Yisroel in Israel. Rabbi David Goldfein completed his schooling through correspondence and learnt under his father from the age of 15.

The Yeshivah's derech (educational model) is built on two main approaches. Primarily, the Yeshivah follows the "Telshe derech", stressing Mussar (Ethics) and Derech Eretz (character and behaviour) alongside Talmud study. Secondly, and in complementary fashion, the derech of the Maharal influences the Yeshivah's approach to learning, and more particularly, its Hashkafa ("worldview"). Additional to these, there is a further and direct link to the Lithuanian yeshivas: In the 1980s, Rabbi Jacob Symanowitz of the Johannesburg Beth Din, taught the shiur ("lecture") in Yoreh Deah, including to the current Roshei Yeshiva, who subsequently studied with him for several years. He, in turn, had studied in Yeshiva Ohel Torah-Baranovich under Elchonon Wasserman, as well as in Mir and Slabodka and received semichah - Yadin Yadin - from Meyer Abovitz.

Yeshivah Gedolah is known for its "uncomplicated approach to learning" — continuing that of Telz, and consistent with the Maharal's approach to Torah study, as well as that of Baranovich — and for its high standards and thorough semichah programme, requiring that graduates "be talmidei chachamim and not just religious functionaries". The Yeshiva has trained dozens of South African rabbis, including Chief Rabbi Dr. Warren Goldstein. More than 50 shuls, 20 communal organisations and virtually all of South Africa's Jewish day schools have been served by its alumni.

The yeshiva also provides learning opportunities and resources to the community. Over the decades, Rabbi Goldfein gave thousands of public lectures, including the very popular weekly Parashat ha-Shavua shiur, more than 1000 of which were recorded and are widely distributed. A documentary film, Bridging Worlds: The Life and Teachings of Rav Azriel Chaim Goldfein was produced in 2014.

== See also ==
- Jewish education in South Africa
- Orthodox yeshivas in South Africa
