= Lubavitch Yeshiva Gedolah of Johannesburg =

Chabad Yeshiva based in Glenhazel, Johannesburg

The Lubavitch Yeshiva Gedolah of Johannesburg ("Yeshivas Ohr Menachem") is a Chabad Yeshiva based in Glenhazel, Johannesburg. It was established by the Lubavitcher Rebbe in 1983, and is headed by Rabbi Noam Wagner, with Rabbi Y. Kesselman as Mashpia. It focuses on the first two years post high school.

== See also ==
- Jewish education in South Africa under History of the Jews in South Africa
- Orthodox yeshivas in South Africa
- Rabbinical College of South Africa
- Rabbinical College of Pretoria
- Torah Academy School, Johannesburg
- Tomchei Temimim
- Yeshiva gedolah (Chabad-Lubavitch)
