= Ohr Somayach, South Africa =

Affiliate of Ohr Somayach, Jerusalem

Ohr Somayach in South Africa is an affiliate of Ohr Somayach, Jerusalem, a network of Haredi yeshivas and Synagogues. Like its parent institution, it focuses on educating baal teshuvas ("returnees" to Orthodox Judaism). It has branches in Johannesburg and Cape Town.

Johannesburg's main campus, in Glenhazel, was founded by Dayan Boruch Rapoport, Rabbi Shmuel Moffson and Rabbi Larry Shain. It includes a full-time Yeshiva, headed by Rabbi Shimon Wolpe. Its Bet Midrash was established in 1990, and its Kollel, Toras Chaim, in 1996 which is currently headed by Rabbi Yechezkil Auerbach and Rabbi Yoel Smith. The campus also houses the Ma'ayan Bina seminary.

In other locations, Ohr Somayach has a minyan in nearby Savoy Estate, while the Sandton branch (est 1991) under Rabbi Ze’ev Kraines, is a “Shtiebel-like” shul and Bet Midrash, and also houses a nursery school. The Shaarei Torah Primary School is based on the main campus. Ohr Somayach Cape Town is a community located in the heart of Sea Point. "Ohrsom" is the young adults' division with its own Shul in Glenhazel, as well as a satellite campus in Sandton. The Sunny Road Shul is an affiliated community, comprising mainly young families.

The associated Yeshiva South Africa (YSA), headed by Rabbi Michael Olitzki, is based in its own Bet Midrash, and is a fully functioning Yeshiva — catering to bochurim — with three learning sessions a day. Rabbi Shlomo Webber is the Mashgiach.

== See also ==
- Baal teshuva
- Jewish education in South Africa under History of the Jews in South Africa
- Jewish fundamentalism
- Orthodox Judaism outreach
- Orthodox yeshivas in South Africa
