= Tomchei Tmimim =

Chabad Lubavitch yeshiva network

- United Lubavitcher Yeshivoth
- תומכי תמימים
- Formation: 1897
- Founder: Sholom Dovber Schneersohn
- Founded at: Lubavitch
- Parent organization: Agudas Chasidei Chabad
- Website: https://cyttl.edu/

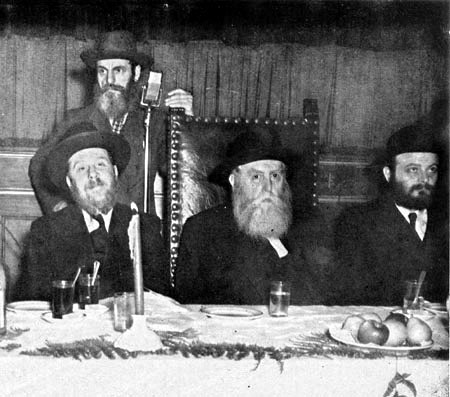
Tomchei Temimim dinner, 1943; Left to right: Rabbis Shemaryahu Gurary, Yosef Yitzchak Schneersohn, and Menachem Mendel Schneerson

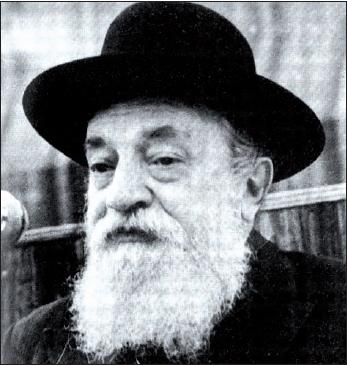
Rabbi Yisroel Yitzchok Piekarski, Senior Rosh Yeshiva for 42 years

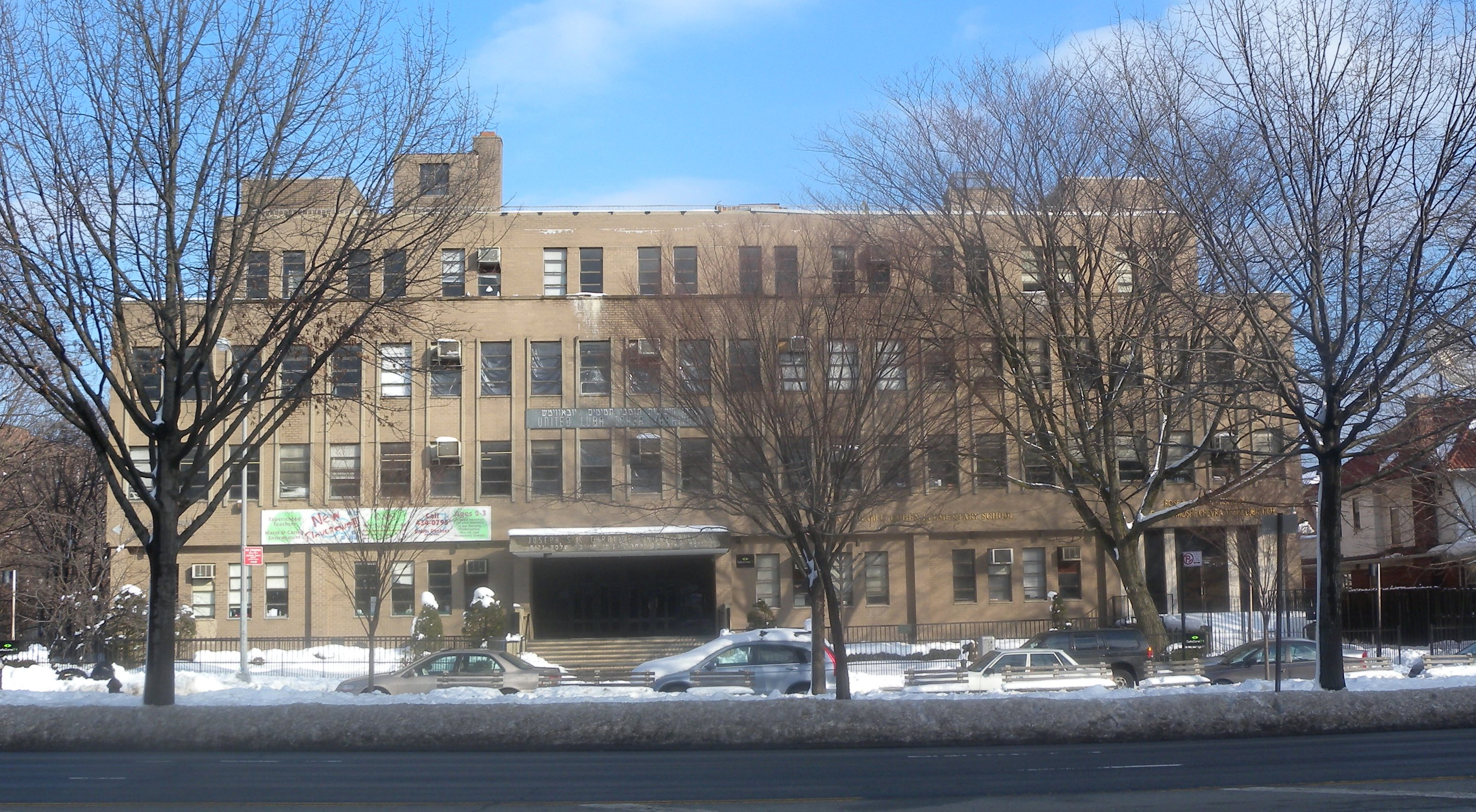
United Lubavitcher Yeshivoth

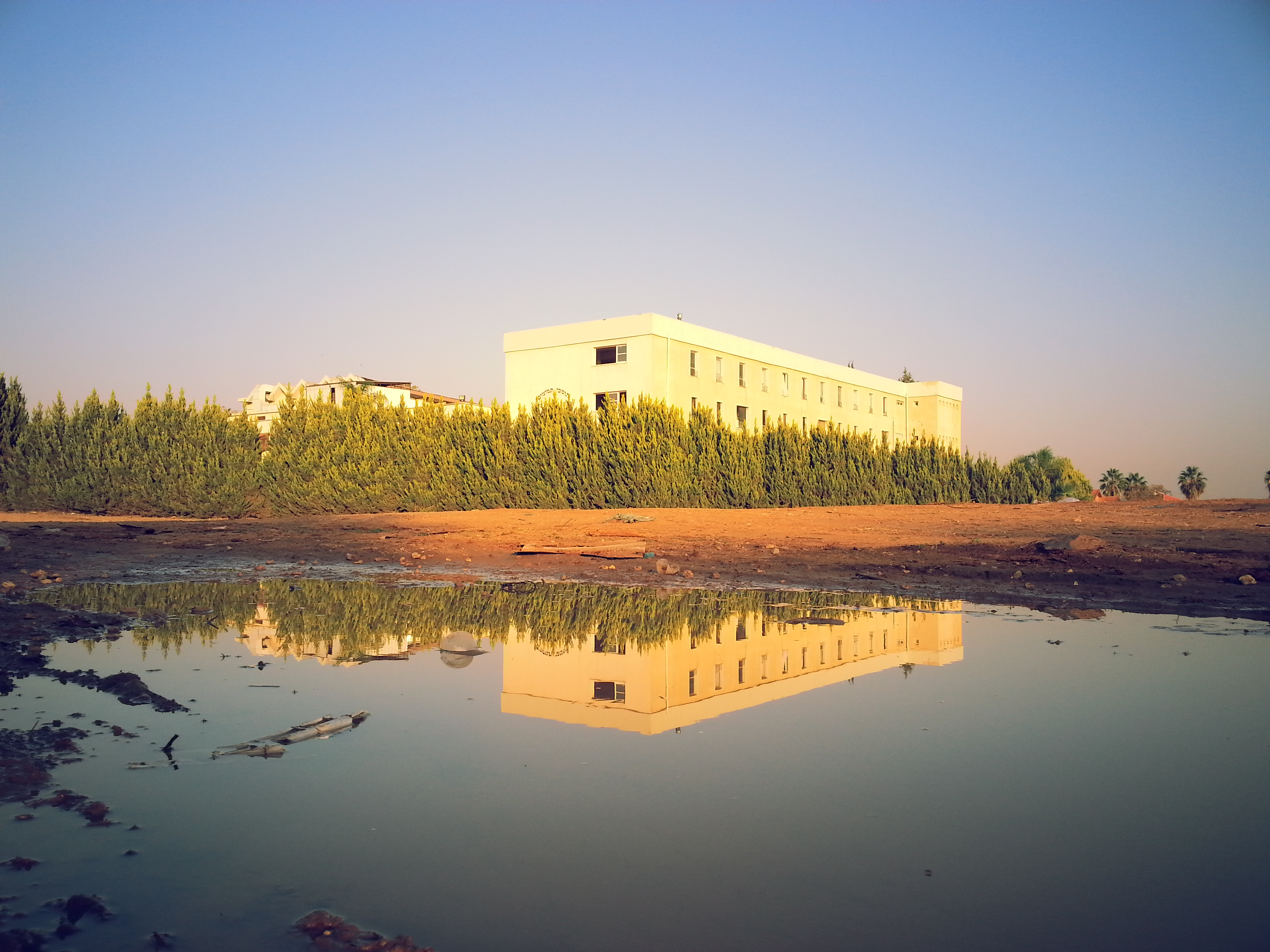
Tomchei Temimim Central Yeshiva, Kfar Chabad

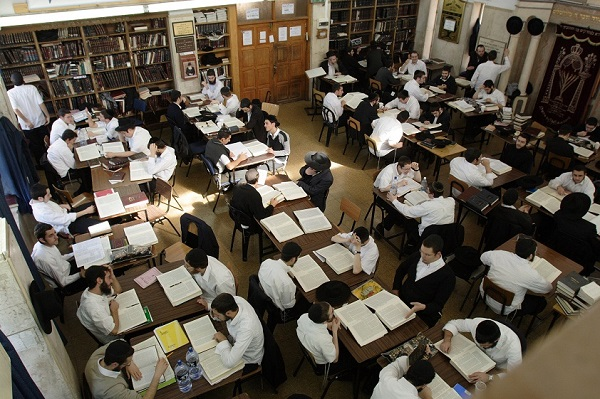
Zal, Toras Emes

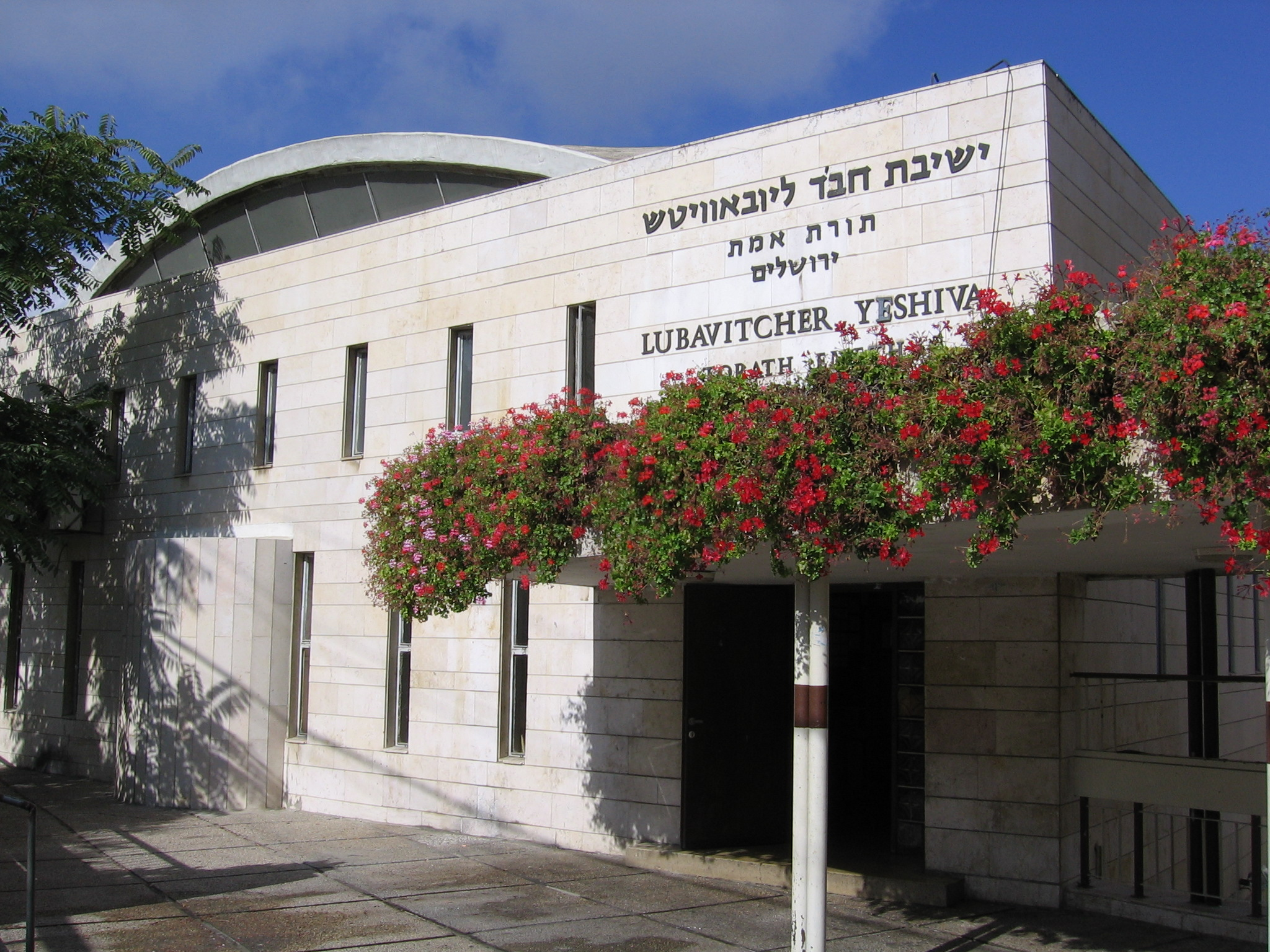
Toras Emes, Jerusalem

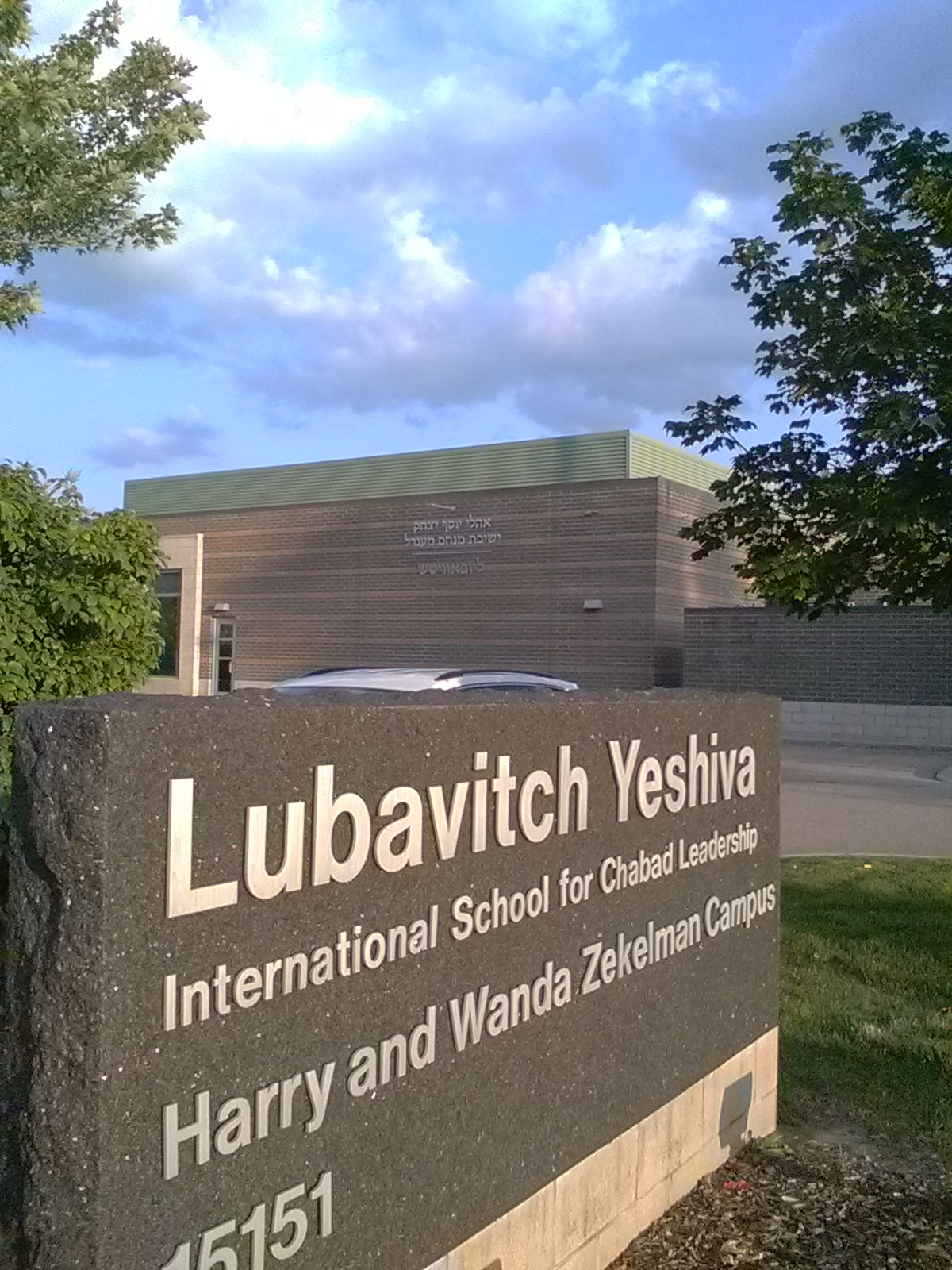
Lubavitch Yeshiva of Oak Park, Michigan

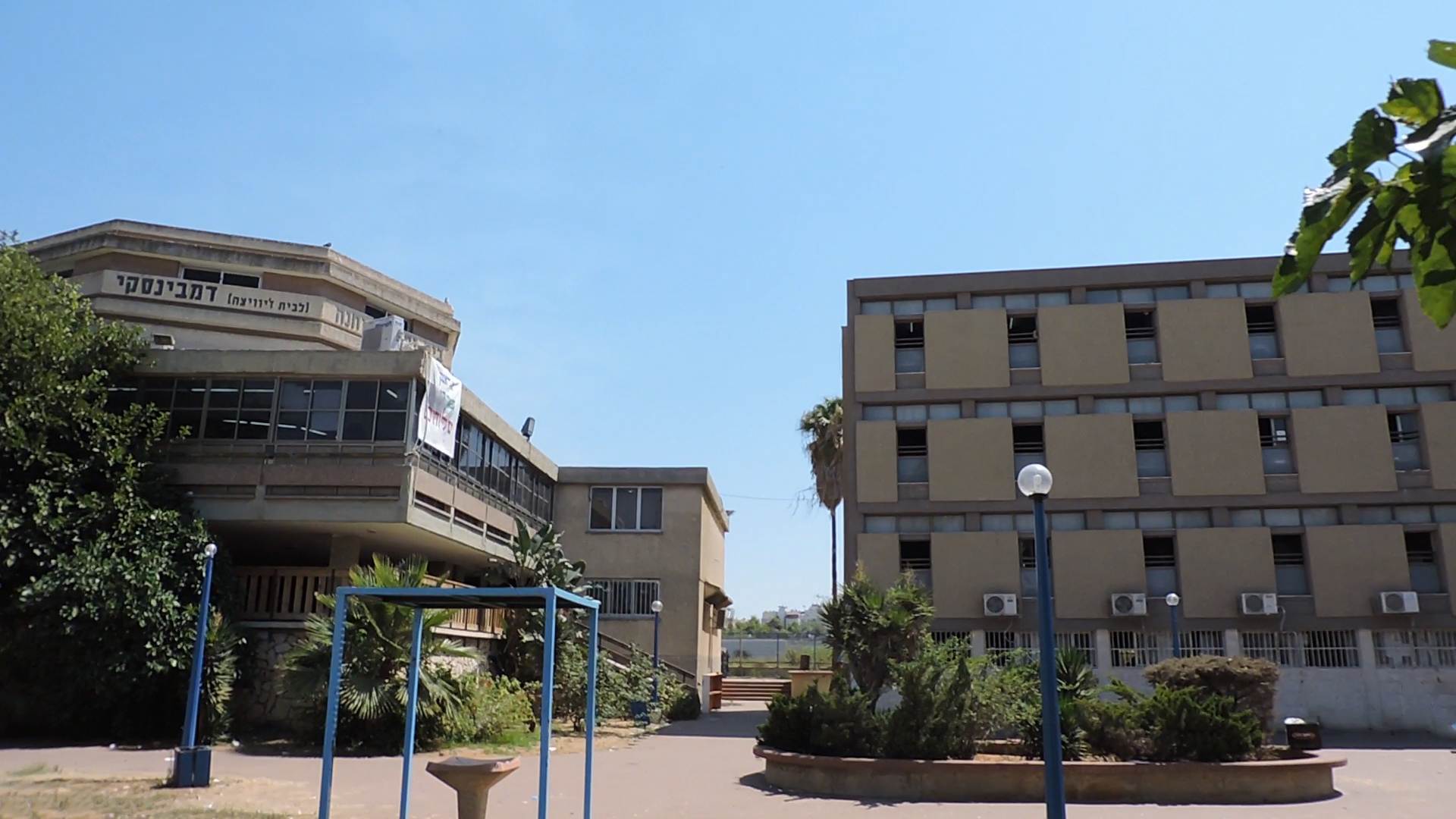
Tomchei Temimim Lod

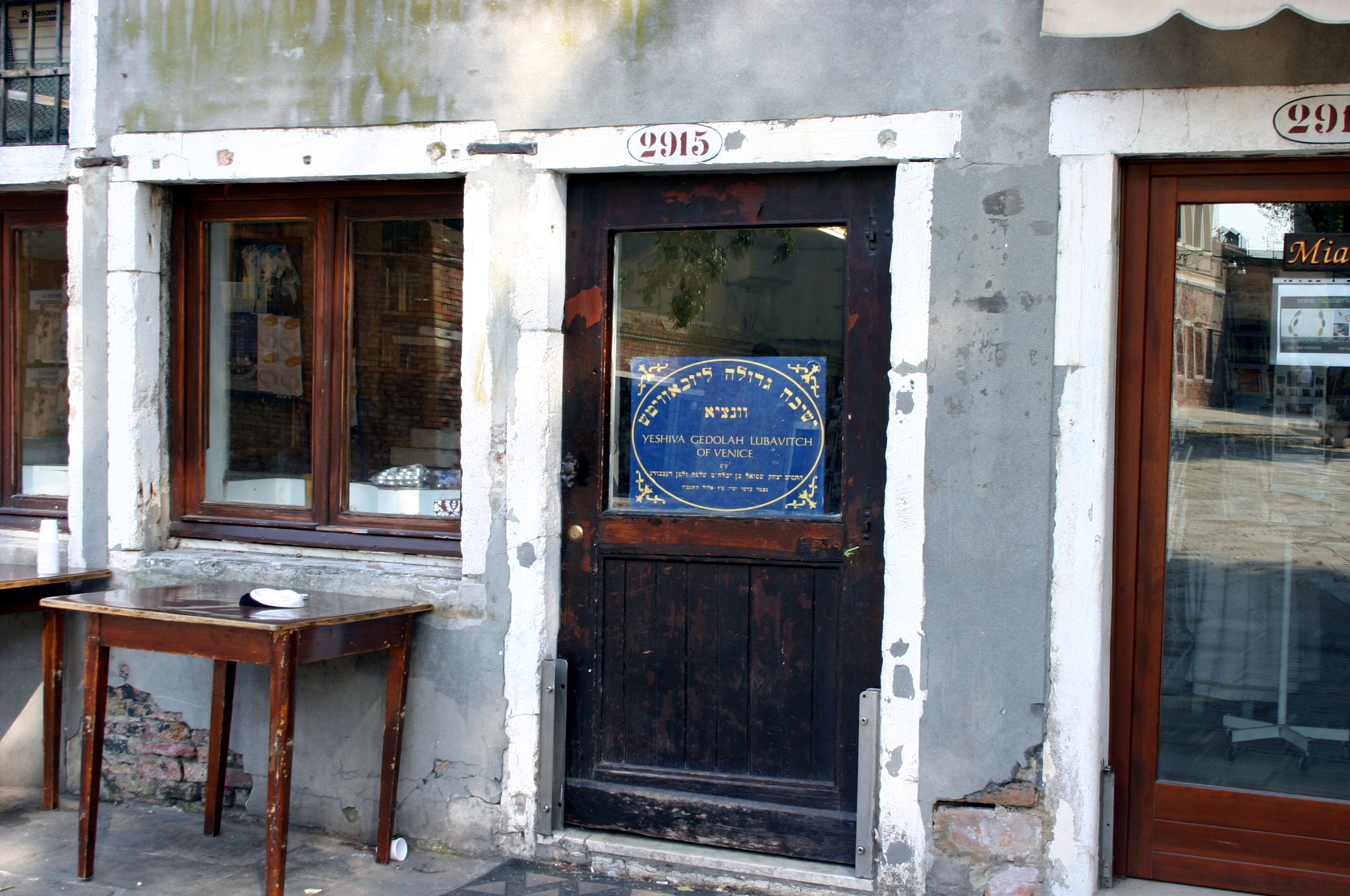
Yeshivah in the former Ghetto in Venice

Tomchei Tmimim (Hebrew: תומכי תמימים, "supporters of the complete-wholesome ones") is the central Yeshiva (Talmudical academy) of the Chabad-Lubavitch Hasidic movement. Founded in 1897 in the town of Lubavitch by Rabbi Sholom Dovber Schneersohn, it is now an international network of institutions of advanced Torah study, the United Lubavitcher Yeshivoth.

== History ==
Tomechei Tmimim was founded in 1897 in Lubavitch, by Rabbi Sholom DovBer Schneersohn for the study of Hasidic philosophy according to the Chabad tradition, in parallel with the traditional Yeshiva curriculum. Here, Rabbi Schneersohn authored Kuntres Eitz HaChayim, guidelines and standards for a student's learning goals and schedule, personal conduct, prayer, and appearance. Correspondingly, he called the students of this yeshiva "tmimim" (sing. "tomim" תמים = pure, perfect).

When Rabbi Yosef Yitzchok Schneersohn left the Soviet Union in 1927, the yeshiva reestablished itself in Warsaw and later in Otwock, Poland. In the course of World War II, the yeshiva escaped to Shanghai, China, along with other yeshivot such as Mir.

Once the Rebbe was safely evacuated to New York, the Yeshiva was reestablished in New York City, where it remains to this day. Within 24 hours the Rebbe had opened a yeshiva branch. Starting with 10 students, the Yeshiva quickly grew to the extent that it expanded to other nearby locations, giving rise to the group known as "United Lubavitcher Yeshivas". Rabbi Yisroel Yitzchok Piekarski was the Rosh Yeshiva for 42 years, from 1951 until 1993.

== Today ==
The central Yeshiva is housed today at the Chabad Lubavitch World Headquarters, at 770 Eastern Parkway in Brooklyn, NY, with approximately six hundred students. Similarly named yeshivas, many of which are independent, are to be found in major cities in the United States, Canada, Europe, South America, South Africa, Australia, and the former Soviet Union, and Israel, although not all include "Tomchei Tmimim" in their names.

Many of the branches also perform the functions necessary to grant Semicha, rabbinical ordination, to their students; true since the 1950s for the majority of students. Some affiliated institutions (often essentially “post-graduate”) specifically focus on Rabbinical training, with the Semicha correspondingly requiring further depth and breadth.

Many graduates of Tomchei Tmimim continue working within Chabad as religious functionaries, whether as shluchim in Chabad Houses or as teachers in schools. Graduates - usually of the latter institutions mentioned - also often work as "community Rabbis" more broadly.

== Global locations ==
=== In North America ===
- The Central Lubavitcher Yeshiva, or Central Yeshiva Tomchei Tmimim Lubavitch, 885 Eastern Parkway, Brooklyn, New York
- United Lubavitcher Yeshivoth – Ocean Parkway, Brooklyn, New York
- United Lubavitcher Yeshivah – Crown Heights, Brooklyn, New York
- Talmudical Seminary Oholei Torah, Brooklyn, New York
- Mesivta Yeshivas Tomchei Tmimim Lubavitch Queens Forest Hills, New York
- Yeshivas Tomchei Tmimim Lubavitch Poconos Canadensis, PA
- Yeshiva Kol Yaakov Yehuda Hadar Hatorah Rabbinical Seminary, Brooklyn, New York
- Yeshiva Ohr Elchonon Chabad, Los Angeles, California.
- Yeshivas Lubavitch Cincinnati, Cincinnati, Ohio.
- Yeshivas Lubavitch Toronto, Toronto, Ontario, Canada
- Yeshiva Or Menachem, Montreal, Quebec, Canada
- Rabbinical College of America, Morristown, New Jersey
- Lubavitch Educational Center – Klurman Mesivta, Miami Beach, Florida
- Yeshivas Lubavitch of Baltimore, Baltimore, Maryland
- Yeshiva Ohr Elchonon Chabad/West Coast Talmudical Seminary, Los Angeles, California
- Oholei Yosef Yitzchok Lubavitch-Mesivta, Oak Park, Michigan
- Yeshivas Menachem Mendel Lubavitch of Monsey, New York
- Yeshivas Beis Dovid Shlomo, New Haven, Connecticut
- Yeshivath Achei Tmimim of Pittsburgh (Yeshiva Schools of Pittsburgh), Pittsburgh, Pennsylvania
- Lubavitch Mesivta of Chicago, Chicago, Illinois
- Central Lubavitch Yeshiva, Chovevei Torah, Brooklyn, New York
- Lubavitch Rabbinical College of Minnesota, Saint Paul, Minnesota
- Mesivta of Postville, Postville, Iowa
- Mesivta of Coral Springs, Coral Springs, Florida
- Albany Mesivta, Albany, New York
- HaMesivta, Ocean Parkway, Brooklyn, New York
- Mesivta Oholei Torah, Brooklyn, New York
- Yeshiva Mesivta Menachem, Westchester, New York
- Yeshiva Torah Ohr, Miami, Florida
- Yeshiva Gedolah of Greater Miami Rabbinical College, Miami, Florida
- Yeshivas Menachem Mendel Lubavitch, Oak Park, Michigan
- Rabbinical College of Canada Quebec-Tomchei Tmimim Lubavitch Bais Medrash, Montreal, Quebec, Canada
- Kingston Mesivta, Kingston, Pennsylvania
- Yeshiva Campus, Suffield, CT https://www.yeshivacampus.com/

=== In Israel ===
- Yeshivat Tomchei Tmimim HaMerkazit (Central Tomchei Temimim Yeshiva), Kfar Chabad
- Yeshivat Tomchei Tmimim Lubavitch Rishon LeZion (Ketana), Rishon Lezion
- Yeshivat Tomchei Tmimim Lubavitch Rishon LeZion (Gedola), Rishon LeZion
- Yeshivat Tomchei Tmimim Lubavitch Nachlat Har Chabad, Kiryat Malachi
- Yeshiva Tomchei Tmimim, Lod
- Yeshivat Ohr Tmimim, Kfar Chabad
- Yeshivas Tzeirei Hashluchim, Safed
- Yeshivas Chasidei Chabad Beis Levi Yitzchak, Safed
- Ohr Simcha, Kfar Chabad
- Beis Sefer Lemelacha, Kfar Chabad
- Tomchei Tmimim Kiryat Gat, Kiryat Gat
- Yeshiva Toras Emes (Chabad), Shikun Chabad, Jerusalem (founded in 1911, also by Rabbi Sholom Dovber Schneersohn, and originally based in Hebron)
- Yeshivat NachlatHar Chabad Beit Haram, Kiryat Malachi
- Yeshivat Tomchei Tmimim Migdal HaEmek, Migdal HaEmek
- Yeshivas Tomchei Tmimim, Or Yehuda
- Yeshivas Tomchei Tmimim, El'ad
- Yeshivas Tomchei Tmimimm, Beersheba
- Yeshivas Lubavitch Tiferes Yisroel, Beit Shemesh
- Yeshivas Ohel Menachem, Beit Shemesh
- Yeshivas Tomchei Tmimim, Beitar Illit
- Yeshivas Tomchei Tmimim-Beis Menachem, Bnei Brak

=== In other locations ===
- Yeshivas Oholei Yosef Yitchak Lubavitch, St Kilda East, Victoria, Australia
- Rabbinical College of Australia and New Zealand, St Kilda East, Victoria, Australia
- Yeshivas Levi Yitzchak St Kilda East, Victoria, Australia
- Yeshiva Gedolah Rabbinical College of Sydney, Bondi, New South Wales, Australia
- Yeshiva College Cheder Chabad-High School Division, Bondi, New South Wales, Australia
- Yeshivas Tomchei Tmimim, Brunoy, France (suburb of Paris)
- Yeshiva Tomchei Tmimim Vincennes, France
- Yeshiva Gedolah Lubavitch London
- Lubavitch Mechinah L'Yeshiva, London, England
- Yeshivas Lubavitch Manchester, Manchester, England
- Boys High School Mesivta, Moscow, Russia
- Yeshiva Ketana Tomchei Tmimim Lubavitch, Moscow, Russia
- Yeshivah Tomchei Tmimim Lubavitch, Moscow, Russia
- Yeshiva Ketana Tomchei Tmimim Lubavitch, Saint-Petersburg, Russia
- Lubavitch Yeshiva Gedolah of Johannesburg, South Africa
- Rabbinical College of Pretoria, South Africa
- Torah Academy School, Johannesburg, South Africa
- Rabbinical College of South Africa
- Yeshiva Gedola, Buenos Aires, Argentina
- Yeshiva Tomchei Tmimim Lubavitch Ohel Menachem, S. Paulo, Brazil
- Yeshiva Gedola Nachlas Levi, Dnipro, Ukraine
- Yeshiva Gedolah Frankfurt, Germany
- Rabbinical Yeshiva, Venice, Italy

== Notable alumni ==
- Meir Ashkenazi, Chief rabbi of Shanghai in early 1900s
- Moshe Gutnick, president of the Rabbinical Council of Australia and New Zealand
- Abraham Hecht, former president of the Rabbinical Alliance of America
- Simon Jacobson, author of Toward a Meaningful Life
- Yosef Yitzchak Jacobson, public lecturer
- Yoel Kahan, scholar of Hasidic philosophy
- Berel Lazar, Chief rabbi of Russia
- Yehoshua Mondshine, researcher and historian
- Nissan Nemanov, director of the Tomchei Temimim Yeshiva in Brunoy, France
- Shlomo Sawilowsky, professor at Wayne State University
- Ezra Schochet, Rosh Yeshiva of Yeshiva Ohr Elchonon Chabad in Los Angeles, California
- Eliyahu Simpson, rabbi
- Marcus Solomon, Supreme Court Justice in Western Australia
- Adin Steinsaltz, scholar and author of the Steinsaltz Talmud
- Levi Wineberg, Rosh Yeshiva, known for his annotated translation of Tanya

== See also ==
- Beth Rivkah – Chabad’s education network for women
