= Yisroel Yitzchok Piekarski =

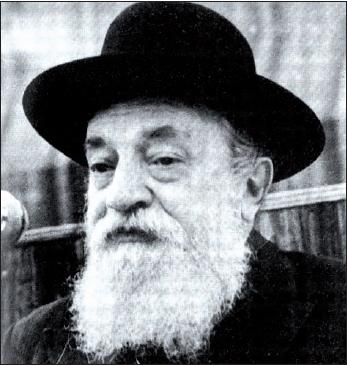
Rabbi Yisroel Yitzchok Piekarski

Rabbi Yisroel Yitzchok Piekarski (1905–1992) was a Polish-born rabbi who was the Rosh Yeshiva of the Lubavich hassidic movement for 42 years.

== Biography ==
Rabbi Yisroel Yitzchok Piekarski was born in Sosnowiec Poland in 1905 to a family of Amshinover hassidim, he was a disciple of Rabbi Aryeh Tzvi Frummer and Rabbi Abraham Weinberg of Warsaw (author of Reishis Bikkurim) After receiving semicha from Rabbi Aryeh Tzvi Frommer, Rabbi Piekarski went on to serve briefly as Rabbi of the small town of Modrzejów in Poland (which is now part of Sosnowiec) before accepting a position as a Rabbi in London England shortly before the outbreak of World War II. In 1947, Rabbi Piekarski emigrated to the United States where he was appointed Rabbi of the "Tzierei Agudas Yisroel" Shul in Bronx New York. In 1951 he was appointed Rosh Yeshiva of Tomchei Temimim of Lubavitch where he taught thousands of students. Simultaneously, he relocated from the Bronx to Queens where he served as the Rabbi of Bais Yakov Shul in Forest Hills NY and delivered shiurim attended by large crowds of admirers.

== Works ==
- Even Yisroel
- Otzros Hashiurim
- Chakrei Hilochos Volume 1
- Chakrei Hilochos Volume 2
- Chakrei Hilochos Volume 3
- Chakrei Hilochos Volume 4
- Chakrei Hilochos Volume 5
- Chakrei Hilochos Volume 6
- Chakrei Hilochos Volume 7
- Chakrei Hilochos Volume 8
- Chakrei Hilochos Volume 9
