= Leila Leah Bronner =

American historian and biblical scholar (1930–2019)

- Born: Leila Leah Amsel; April 22, 1930; Czechoslovakia
- Died: July 2, 2019 (aged 89); Los Angeles, California, U.S.
- Education: University of the Witwatersrand; University of Pretoria
- Occupations: Jewish historian, biblical scholar
- Spouse: Joseph Bronner
- Children: 3

Rebbetzin Leila Leah Bronner (née Amsel; April 22, 1930 – July 2, 2019) was an American historian and biblical scholar.

== Biography ==
She was born in Czechoslovakia and immigrated to the United States in 1937, growing up in Williamsburg, Brooklyn.

In 1949, she married Rabbi Joseph Bronner (born August 1, 1923), who had escaped Berlin with his family in 1941. They moved with their newborn daughter to Johannesburg, South Africa in 1951, where she began her career. She taught at the University of the Witwatersrand and she co-founded the Yeshiva College of South Africa. In 1984, the family moved to Los Angeles, California, where Leila Bronner taught at American Jewish University and the University of Southern California. She became president of Emunah Women, and was involved in Amit Women, Builders of Jewish Education, and the Jewish Federation.

She authored four books, including two books about biblical women, in which she showed that they are represented in many different ways, and another book about the afterlife, in which she tackled both Hassidic and Kabbalistic approaches.

Leila Leah Bronner died on July 2, 2019, in Los Angeles, aged 89, She was survived by her husband, three children, and extended family.

== Selected works ==
- Bronner, Leila Leah (1974). Biblical Personalities and Archaeology. Jerusalem, Israel: Keter Publishing House. ISBN 9780706514216. OCLC 602863385.
- Bronner, Leila Leah (1994). From Eve to Esther: Rabbinic Reconstructions of Biblical Women. Louisville, Kentucky: Westminster John Knox Press. ISBN 9780664255428. OCLC 29597319.
- Bronner, Leila Leah (2004). Stories of Biblical Mothers: Maternal Power in the Hebrew Bible. Dallas, Texas: University Press of America. ISBN 9780761828297. OCLC 56070288.
- Bronner, Leila Leah (2011). Journey to Heaven: Exploring Jewish Views of the Afterlife. Jerusalem, Israel: Urim Publications. ISBN 9789655240474. OCLC 732666923.
