= Boris Gersman =

Jewish newspaper editor in South Africa

Boris (Dov-Ber) Gersman (or Gershman; 8 May 1900 in Upyna – 3 April 1953 Johannesburg) was a Jewish musician and businessman from Lithuania who emigrated to South Africa and became the publisher and editor of the Afrikaner Yidishe Tsaytung (The African Jewish Newspaper).

== Early life and education ==
Boris Gersman was born on May 8, 1900, in Upyna near Šilalė. He was the eldest of five siblings born to his parents Zalman (alternatively: Zelik) and Fayga Gersman. After Zalman emigrated to South Africa for economic reasons and took care of the family from there, Fayga moved with the children to Vilnius, where Boris attended a Russian high school and later studied violin at the music conservatory. During this time, the family could not follow Zalman to South Africa due to the outbreak of the First World War. After the end of the war and a stay in Berlin, Fayga took the children to Vienna, where they took English lessons and Boris continued to study violin. In 1920 they were finally able to follow their father to South Africa. (Note: Attributed to multiple references:)

== Career ==
After a few months in Wepener, Boris Gersman moved to Johannesburg. Initially earning his living in physical labour, he then came to work there as a violinist in a silent film orchestra. With the advent of talkies he looked for other job opportunities, but continued to play with the Johannesburg Symphony Orchestra.

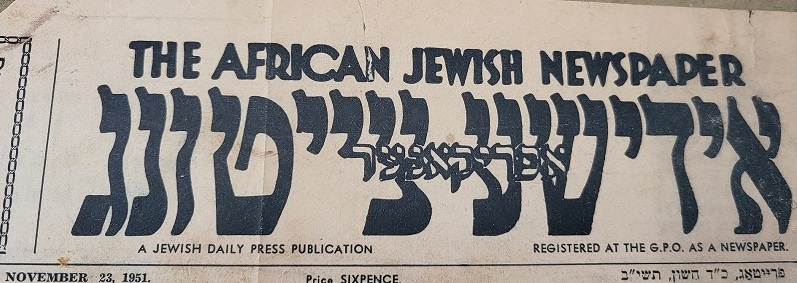
The Afrikaner Yidisher Tsaytung

While some sources imply that Gersman founded the Afrikaner Yidishe Tsaytung himself, others (both older and more recent studies) elaborate that the weekly newspaper had actually been founded by Dr. Ben-Zion Almuni (or Almoni), another journalist from Vinius; with Gersman working as this Yiddish newspaper's advertising salesman before he bought it in 1931 and became its publisher, and later (from 1949) also its editor. (Note: Attributed to multiple references:)

Gersman married Fanny Cecilia, also from Šilalė in Lithuania. The couple had two daughters. In addition to the newspaper, Gersman bought a printing factory that not only printed the newspaper, but secured the family's financial livelihood.

Gersman is credited for running the newspaper with great enthusiasm, being especially competent at securing its funding and expanding it into one of the country's most important Yiddish newspapers. Particularly, two other Yiddish newspapers in South Africa – Der Afrikaner (in 1933/1934) (Note: Attributed to multiple references:) and Der Yiddisher Express (in 1937) – were incorporated into the Afrikaner Yidishe Tsaytung, at times even resulting in a twice-weekly from 1936 to 1942 (then returning to weekly publication). Having started with just eight pages, the newspaper expanded to eight and later 20 pages, with special issues on holidays.

In 1946, Gersman, together with Solomon Kartun, also briefly issued an irregular humorous magazine named Der Blitz (The Lightning).

According to Joseph Sherman, the Afrikaner Yidishe Tsaytung maintained a high standard of journalism. Gersman was in close contact with correspondents abroad and strongly objected sensational reports.

Boris and Fanny Gersman with Elijahu Jones (right) in the DP camp Berlin-Schlachtensee, 1947

In July 1947, Gersman travelled to Europe with his wife Fanny. With the permission of the American authorities, the couple visited various DP camps, "on behalf of the South African Jewish War Appeal to survey the situation of needy Jews on the Continent." A photo shows the encounter with Eliyahu Jones in the Berlin DP-Camp Schlachtensee – Jones was editor of the Yiddish DP newspaper Undzer Lebn.

On the trip, Gersman also met Levi Shalitan (later Shalit), who had founded Undzer Veg, the most important post-war Yiddish newspaper in Munich. The two agreed that Shalit's articles should also appear in Gersman's newspaper. During the trip and visits to the DP camps, Gersman suffered his first heart attack.

Back in Johannesburg, the Afrikaner Yidishe Tsaytung published Shalit's reports on the situation of the DPs. Shalit soon became the main journalist for the newspaper. The editing was led by Shmaryahu Levin.

In addition to his publishing activities, Gersman was an enthusiastic promoter of Yiddish culture in South Africa and supported many Jewish artists in South Africa as well as in Europe and Israel. Cultural issues played an important role in the Afrikaner Yidishe Tsaytung and Gersman's private home was a meeting place for Jewish artists, writers and musicians. In Johannesburg he supported, among others, artist Irma Stern and the Russian actor Ossip Runitsch, whom he encouraged to play on Yiddish stages in South Africa. Gersman was also involved in trying to start a Yiddish theater company in South Africa. (Note: Attributed to multiple references:)

Boris Gersman died of a heart attack at the age of 52 on April 3, 1953 (Note: Attributed to multiple references:) in Johannesburg.

The newspaper was continued after Gersman's death by Levi Shalit along with Shmarya Levin. It existed until 1985.

== Recognition ==
Boris Gersman was referenced in the Leksikon fun der Nayer Yidisher Literatur (1958), a comprehensive biographical reference work on Yiddish literature published by the Congress for Jewish Culture. After the Afrikaner Yidisher Tsaytung had been suspended in the mid-1980s, Gersman's role in the South African Yiddish press also fell into obscurity. Recent scholarship has begun to reassess this legacy. Underlining the significance of the Afrikaner Yidishe Tsaytung within South African Yiddish culture as a successful weekly, Cedric Ginsberg (2011) noted Gersman's "able guidance" and described the paper as containing "treasures … waiting to be mined".As Veronica Penkin Belling (2024) observes, the Afrikaner Yidishe Tsaytung was never systematically archived, yet preliminary research into its surviving issues highlights the contributions of "formerly neglected personalities, such as the editors Boris Gershman and Levi Shalit, which add a fresh new dimension to our understanding of our predominantly Litvak origins, and how they shaped the nature of the South African Jewish community." In parallel, Andrea Livnat (2024) has published a detailed biographical account, further indicating broader scholarly interest in Gersman and his work across Jewish studies and historical research.
