= Afrikaner-Jews =

Afrikaner-Jode

Regions with significant populations
- Cape Town, Pretoria and Johannesburg.

Languages
- Yiddish; Afrikaans; Hebrew

Religion
- Judaism

Related ethnic groups
- Afrikaners; Dutch Jews; Israelis; Anglo-Israelis

Afrikaner-Jews (Afrikaans: Afrikaner-Jode, also called Boerejode) are Jewish Afrikaners. At the beginning of the 19th century, when greater freedom of religious practice was permitted in South Africa, small numbers of Ashkenazi Jews arrived from Britain and Germany. They established the first Ashkenazi Hebrew congregation in 1841. Between the end of the 19th century and 1930, large numbers of Jews began to arrive from Lithuania and Latvia. Their culture and contribution changed the character of the South African community.

== Notable Afrikaner-Jews ==
- Olga Kirsch, was a noted Afrikaans author and poet.
- Pieter-Dirk Uys is a South African satirist, active as a performer, author, and social activist.
- Joel Stransky, rugby player.
- Jeremy Reingold, rugby player and swimmer.

== See also ==
- South African Jews
