= Glenhazel =

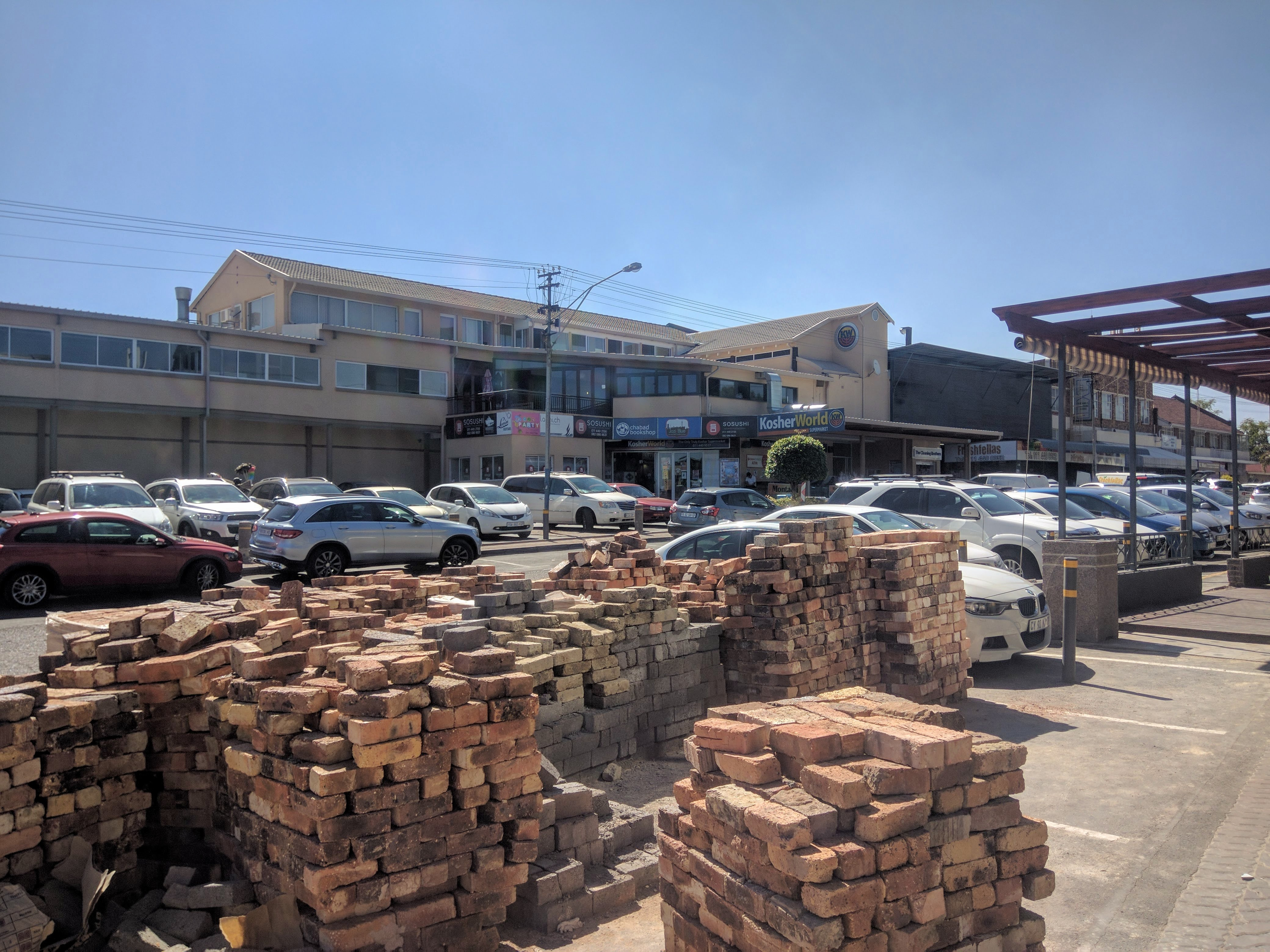
- Glenhazel Centre

- Location within Gauteng Location within South Africa
- Coordinates: 26°8′34″S 28°6′2″E
- Country: South Africa
- Province: Gauteng
- Municipality: City of Johannesburg
- Main Place: Johannesburg
- Established: 1950
  - Councillor: (Democratic Alliance)

Area
  - Total: 1.29 km^{2} (0.50 sq mi)

Population (2011)
  - Total: 2,991
  - Density: 2,320/km^{2} (6,010/sq mi)

Racial makeup (2011)
  - Black African: 23.2%
  - Coloured: 0.5%
  - Indian/Asian: 0.1%
  - White: 75.3%
  - Other: 0.9%

First languages (2011)
  - English: 76.9%
  - Zulu: 4.9%
  - Tswana: 4.3%
  - Northern Sotho: 3.6%
  - Other: 10.4%
- Time zone: UTC+2 (SAST)
- Postal code (street): 2192

Glenhazel is a suburb of Johannesburg, South Africa. It is located in Region E, bordering Fairmount, Sandringham, Lyndhurst and Percelia Estate. The area lies on a sloping hill with a park in the valley. It is known for its large Jewish population as well as for being home to the largest Jewish kosher hub in Johannesburg, which attracts many Jewish tourists.

== History ==
The suburb is situated on part of an old Witwatersrand farm called Rietfontein and was established in 1950. In 1992, Helen Heldenmuth, an actress and prominent figure among South African Jewry, opened up her Glenhazel home as a refuge for black children and their mothers fleeing violence in the nearby black township of Alexandra.

== Jewish community ==
Glenhazel is well known for being a suburb with a high ethnic concentration of Jewish people. A large number of synagogues, schools and Jewish seminaries are based in and around the Glenhazel area. In the context of a religious revival in the 1960s, a group of Jews established a highly observant, Orthodox enclave in the suburb. Overseas rabbis from the Ohr Somayach movement established themselves in Glenhazel, now the epicenter of Orthodox Jewish life in the city with Yeshiva College of South Africa, and Kosher stores, delicatessens and restaurants.

In 1997, the mostly Jewish residents of Glenhazel and the adjoining Jewish suburb of Sandringham funded the establishment of their own police station. Crime in the suburb has decreased significantly since the Chief Rabbi, Warren Goldstein introduced Community Active Protection (CAP) to Glenhazel. The Orthodox Jewish character of the suburb was profiled for SABC's 'Issues of Faith' documentary series.

In 2013, 2, 000 Jewish South African women converged on a street in the suburb for a mass Challah bake. The street had been closed, with permission from the city council, and the women learned to knead and shape the dough before taking it home to bake for their Shabbat. The challah bake was part of The Shabbos Project, a project of South Africa's Chief Rabbi Warren Goldstein.

== Places of worship ==
- Ohr Somayach, an Orthodox synagogue
- Shaarei Chaim, an Orthodox synagogue
- The BASE Shul, an Orthodox synagogue
- Sunny Road Kehilla, an Orthodox synagogue
- Adas Yeshurun Shul, an Orthodox synagogue on the border with Fairmount
- Iliana, a Religious Society of Friends church
- Aldergate Methodist Church, a Methodist church.
- the Torah centre formed by Rabbi Shternbuch. Originally founded in Yoeville but moved to the greater Jewish area, Glenhazel.
- Yeshiva College
- Yeshiva Gedolah
- YSA, Yeshiva of South Africa
- Lebuvitch Yeshiva Gedolah
- RCSA, Rabbinical College of South Africa
- Maharsha, an orthodox synagogue
- Keter Eliyahu, an orthodox sephardi synagogue
- Kehillas Chofetz Chaim, an orthodox synagogue
- Sydenham Shul, an orthodox synagogue
- Kehillas Yad Avrohom, an orthodox synagogue
- Ha'meor, an orthodox lebuvitch synagogue
- Aish Hatorah, an orthodox synagogue

== Education ==
- Yeshiva College of South Africa, a Modern Orthodox Jewish day school established in 1953 that serves pupils between ages 3–18
- Mesivta Shaarei Torah Boys High School
- Ohr Somayach, South Africa, a Yeshiva
- Glenhazel Primary School, a public English medium co-educational primary school
