= Gus Saron =

South African activist

Gustav "Gus" Saron
- Born: 1905; Johannesburg, South Africa
- Died: 1989 (aged 83–84); Johannesburg, South Africa

Gustav "Gus" Saron (1905 – 1989) was associated with the South African Jewish Board of Deputies for almost half a century. He was appointed Secretary in 1936 and General Secretary in 1940. He retired at the end of 1974, but continued in the role of Honorary Consultant. In July 1966 Saron completed thirty years of service as the Board's General Secretary, the top post in South African Jewry's "civil service," and was suitably feted by communal leaders. Johannesburg-born, Saron lectured in classics and Hebrew at the Witwatersrand University before practising law and joining the staff of the Board of Deputies. He played a key part in combating Nazi propaganda in South Africa during the Hitler years, and in expanding the Board's scope and activities. In lieu of taking a sabbatical leave, Saron embarked, in October 1966, on a five-months' study tour of Jewish communities in the United States, Europe, and Israel.
