= Yeshiva of Cape Town =

Jewish educational institution in South Africa

Coordinates: 33°55′4″S 18°23′22″E

The Yeshiva of Cape Town is a kollel and yeshiva established in 1994. Its full title is "The Rabbi Cyril and Ann Harris Yeshiva of Cape Town", named for the late Chief Rabbi. It is based in the Green and Sea Point Hebrew Congregation, in the suburb of Sea Point, Cape Town.

The Yeshiva's ideology is Religious Zionist / Centrist Orthodox. It was previously headed by Rabbi Sam Thurgood, Rabbi Eitan Bendavid, Rabbi Moshe Ordman, Rabbi Nachum Romm, Rabbi Yossi Slotnik and Rabbi Ori Einhorn, and originally by Rabbi Jonathan Glass and Moshe Kornblum. It served as the blueprint for the Torah MiTzion global Kollel initiative, now operating in some 40 cities. The Bachurim (students) of the Yeshiva come from Israel for a period of 11 months, mainly from hesder yeshivot.

The Yeshiva provides "a depth and breadth of Torah study for the entire Cape Town community". It operates a chavruta programme (partnered study) at various synagogues in the city; it participates in and initiates programs throughout Cape Town and has a learning program in a different community every night. It also participates in Shabbat activities in various communities each week. Over 400 people participate weekly in the yeshiva's various activities. The Yeshiva has also partnered with United Herzlia Schools, the local day schools, to enhance Torah education throughout the system. The bochrim also work as madrichim ("counselors") at the Bnei Akiva South Africa summer camp.

== See also ==
- Jewish education in South Africa under History of the Jews in South Africa The first External Rosh Yeshiva was Rabbi Shmuel Herschler.
- Orthodox yeshivas in South Africa
- Kollel Bet Mordechai

== External links and references ==
- Homepage: yeshiva.org.za (out of date)
- Listing on torahmitzion.org
- Beit Midrash Morasha
