= Aliens Act, 1937 =

South African law

- Coat of Arms used during the Act’s enforcement

Parliament of South Africa
- Long title: To restrict and regulate the entry of certain aliens into the Union and their residence or temporary sojourn therein, and to restrict and regulate the right of any person to assume a surname.
- Citation: Act No. 1 of 1937
- Territorial extent: Union of South Africa and South West Africa (incl. Eastern Caprivi Zipfel)
- Enacted by: Parliament of South Africa
- Assented to: 12 February 1937
- Commenced: 1 February 1937
- Repealed: 1992
- Administered by: Department of the Interior (South Africa)
- Introduced by: J. B. M. Hertzog, Prime Minister

Amended by
- Aliens Amendment Act, 1961; Commonwealth Relations Act, 1962; Aliens Amendment Act, 1967; Aliens and Immigration Laws Amendment Proclamation, 1989; Namibian Citizenship Act, 1990

Repealed by
- Births and Deaths Registration Act, 1992 (section 33)

Summary
- A law passed to restrict Jewish immigration during the rise of Nazi Germany, giving discretionary powers to a screening board and also regulating legal surname changes in South Africa and South West Africa.
- Status: Repealed

Aliens Act 1 of 1937 was a South African law aimed at curtailing Jewish immigration to South Africa just as it was increasing due to increased antisemitic repression in Nazi Germany. The Act instituted an Immigrants Selection Board which would screen every potential immigrant coming to South Africa from outside of the British Empire or Ireland with the power to either grant or withhold a permit to enter the country. One of the qualifications the Board considered when assessing immigrants was "assimilability", a term not defined by the legislation and thus left to the board to interpret subjectively. "Unassimilability" was a criticism made of the Jews and thus its use as a criterion was seen as a pretext for excluding Jewish migrants.

With the increase of Jewish immigration to South Africa in 1936, with the deterioration of the situation for Jews in Germany, so too increased political pressure within South Africa to curtail the migration. The United Party government led by Prime Minister Hertzog introduced the Bill in order to restrict and regulate immigration and exercise control over resident aliens.

The National Party's Daniel Malan, leader of the opposition, unsuccessfully attempted to amend the bill to prohibit Jewish immigration explicitly, to end the further naturalization of Jewish permanent residents of South Africa and to close certain professions from Jews and "other non-assimilable races". Malan argued that Jews were getting the best jobs and that "the Afrikaner is suffering in consequence". Arguing for his amendment, Malan said of Jews, "Now the question arises with us, as a people, not only how we are going to keep them out in future, but how we are going to protect ourselves against those who are here."

The Jewish community within South Africa was divided on the bill. Jewish United Party MPs voted for it, as it did not specifically mention Jews. Some members of the South African Jewish Board of Deputies supported the Bill as they feared Jewish immigration from Germany would intensify antisemitism within South Africa.

The Aliens Act became law in February 1937 and put into place an Immigrants Selection Board which was given the power to issue or refuse to grant permits to any prospective immigrant who was not a citizen by birth or descent of the British Empire or Irish Free State.

Jewish immigration from Germany fell as a result of the Act to a few thousand with approval for entry normally being given only to wives and young children of Jews already resident in South Africa or to their elderly parents or grandparents. In many cases, entry permits which had already been granted to relatives of South African Jews prior to the passage of the Act were cancelled and many German Jews who might otherwise had been able to find refuge in South Africa instead were murdered in the Holocaust.

== See also ==
- History of the Jews in South Africa
