= Marcus Solomon =

Australian judge

Hon. Justice Marcus Solomon SC
- Education: University of Western Australia
- Occupations: Judge, Rabbi

Marcus Solomon is an Australian jurist and rabbi who currently serves as a justice of the Supreme Court of Western Australia. He is the first Orthodox rabbi to serve as a Supreme Court justice in Australia.

== Biography ==
Solomon grew up in Perth. His father Geoffrey was the president of Newcastle synagogue. While in high school, he was sent to attend Yeshivah College in Melbourne for 11th and 12th grade. He then studied at the Rabbinical College of Australia and New Zealand before moving to Israel to study at the Tomchei Tmimim yeshiva in Kfar Chabad. He then went to New York City to study at the Tomchei Tmimim yeshiva in Brooklyn, where he was ordained as a rabbi. After returning to Australia, he began teaching in a Jewish day school and studying at university, initially taking education, arts, philosophy, and politics classes before going to law school.

In 1991, Solomon graduated from the University of Western Australia with First Class Honours. He worked as a solicitor and then a partner at two law firms before moving to the independent Bar.

In 1993 he established the Beit Midrash of Western Australia.

In 2013 he was appointed Senior Counsel.

In August 2021 he became a justice of the Supreme Court of Western Australia. He also maintains his position as the senior rabbi of the Dianella Shule.
