= Kollel Yad Shaul =

Ultra-orthodox yeshiva in South Africa

- Type: Private yeshiva
- Established: 1970
- Founders: Rabbi Jacob Salzer, Rabbi Koppel Bacher
- Religious affiliation: Charedi Judaism
- Location: 5 Water Ln, The Gardens, Johannesburg, Gauteng, South Africa; 26.1510°S 28.0807°E
- Website: kollelyadshaul.co.za

Kollel Yad Shaul is a Charedi (ultra-orthodox) yeshiva based in Johannesburg, South Africa. The rosh yeshiva (dean) is Rabbi Yitchak Grossnass. It was first established in 1970 in Yeoville by the Adath Yeshurun, a congregation established in 1936 by German Jewish migrants.

== History ==
It was established in 1970 by the Adath Yeshurun congregation. In the preceding years, the mostly-German Jewish congregation of the neo-orthodox tradition became more open to the broader Jewish community in response to growing interest in religious Jewish education. From the 1960s, its rigorous Talmud Torah school welcomed religious families that were not affiliated with the congregation. The school departed from other day schools in that it offered a more demanding standard of religious education. In 1966, the congregation established Yeshivas Toras Emes, a boys' high school.

Kollel Yad Shaul first began as a nucleus, mostly attracting young religious men England. It had an outsize impact on Johannesburg's Orthodox Jewish community, with Rabbi Norman Bernard describing it as "like water hitting parched soil."

"The Kollel", as it is known, played a pioneering role in the growth and spread of Torah in South Africa. It has produced dozens of Rabbis and educators over the decades.

Its Beit Midrash is open, also, to the wider community; as is its lending library. It previously housed the Yeshiva Pri Eitz Chaim.

It remained in Yeoville until 2000, when it moved to the suburb of The Gardens. Rabbi Boruch Dov Grossnass headed the institution for 40 years; he took over from founder, Rabbi Mordechai Shakovitzky. From 2018 to 2021 it was headed by Rabbi Baruch Rubanowitz.

== See also ==
- Jewish education in South Africa
- Orthodox yeshivas in South Africa
