= Yeshiva College of South Africa =

Jewish day school in Johannesburg, South Africa

Coordinates: 26.1417°S 28.1076°E

Information
- Established: 1951; 75 years ago
- Grades: Nursery - Grade 12
- Gender: Mixed (girls and boys taught separately in grades 7-12)
- Age: 3 to 18
- Enrollment: c.1,000
- Website: www.yeshivacollege.co.za

The Yeshiva College of South Africa (Yeshivat Beit Yitzchak), commonly known as Yeshiva College - and formerly known as Yeshivat Bnei Akiva - is South Africa’s largest religious Jewish Day School.

== Yeshiva College ==
Yeshiva College was established in the beginning of 1951; it is located in the Glenhazel area of Johannesburg, Gauteng, South Africa.

Throughout Yeshiva College's history, it has grown in numbers and stature. The school has around 1000 pupils, between the ages of 3 and 18. It consists of a nursery school (up to age 6), a coeducational primary school (grades 0-6), and separate boys' and girls' high schools (grade 7-12).

The school adopts a Religious Zionist and Modern Orthodox philosophy. Throughout, pupils study a double curriculum, focusing on Torah study as well as secular studies; students ultimately sitting for the National Senior Certificate (see Matriculation in South Africa), where the school achieves competitively. Various sports and cultural activities are offered and encouraged.

== History ==
The yeshiva was co-founded by Rabbi Michel Kossowsky, an Eastern European Talmudic scholar who had settled in South Africa during the Holocaust, and Rabbi Joseph Bronner, an alumnus of the Yeshiva Rabbi Chaim Berlin in Brooklyn, New York, who had settled in South Africa after World War II and was active in the business world.

The yeshiva was named for Rabbi Kossowsky's father, Rabbi Yitzchak Kossowsky, who had preceded him and had served as one of the heads of Johannesburg's Beth Din ("religious court".)

The first full-time instructor of Talmud at the yeshiva was Rabbi David Sanders (rabbi), who was brought out from the Telz yeshiva in the United States to teach the young students Talmud in the traditional style of the Lithuanian yeshivas.

Sanders helped to bring Rabbi Avraham Tanzer, also an alumnus of the Telz, to teach at the yeshiva. Eventually Rabbi Tanzer was appointed the Rosh yeshivah ("dean") of the school, a position which he retained until his death in 2020.

Rabbi Tanzer, in turn, brought out Rabbi Azriel Goldfein (again, a fellow Telz yeshiva alumnus) to be a co-Rosh yeshiva; Rabbi Goldfein eventually left to establish the Yeshivah Gedolah of Johannesburg. In the 1980s Rabbi Aharon Pfeuffer similarly taught at the school.

In 1984, the college rededicated the Leila Bronner Girl’s High School in honour of Rebbetzin Leila Leah Bronner, a co-founder of Yeshiva College.

The staff today includes Rabbanim from Israeli, American and South African yeshivot, and graduates of several seminaries, and retains its close association with the Bnei Akiva youth movement, extending to Mizrachi, and its local Kollel Bet Mordechai.

== Today ==
In 2026, the college merged with Hirsch-Lyons. Enrolment at Hirsch-Lyons peaked in the early 2000s but had since suffered from waves of emigration. As part of the merger agreement, Hirsch Lyons Boys’ High School will relocate to the Yeshiva College campus in Glenhazel. However, the Hirsch Lyons Girls’ High School will retain its existing campus, and operate under the Yeshiva College umbrella alongside the Yeshiva College Girls’ High School.

In October 2026, Rabbi Daniel Kaplan was appointed as rosh hayeshiva with immediate effect. From January 2027, veteran sports executive Stan Matthews will serve as the college's new executive director.

Enrolment as of 2026 is 864, slightly down from 900 five years ago. The new leadership aims to recover these numbers and increase enrolment. A major campus rejuvenation is planned, with plans to create a sporting precinct.

== See also ==
- §Jewish education in South Africa — under History of the Jews in South Africa.
- Orthodox yeshivas in South Africa
- Kollel Bet Mordechai
- Jewish day school
- Torah study
- Yeshiva
- Yeshiva College (disambiguation)
