= Percelia Estate =

- Location within Gauteng Location within South Africa
- Coordinates: 26.141°S 28.092°E
- Country: South Africa
- Province: Gauteng
- Municipality: City of Johannesburg
- Main Place: Johannesburg

Area
  - Total: 0.32 km^{2} (0.12 sq mi)

Population (2011)
  - Total: 930
  - Density: 2,900/km^{2} (7,500/sq mi)

Racial makeup (2011)
  - Black African: 21.4%
  - Coloured: 0.8%
  - Indian/Asian: 1.4%
  - White: 76.3%
  - Other: 0.1%

First languages (2011)
  - English: 81.7%
  - Afrikaans: 4.7%
  - Zulu: 3.3%
  - Northern Sotho: 2.7%
  - Other: 7.6%
- Time zone: UTC+2 (SAST)

Percelia Estate is a suburb of Johannesburg, South Africa. It is located in Region E of the City of Johannesburg Metropolitan Municipality.

== History ==
The suburb is situated on part of an old Witwatersrand farm called Klipfontein. It became a suburb on 14 September 1938. It takes its name from the first names from the land owners Percy Michels and Elias Sandler.

== Landmarks ==
One famous landmark in Percelia Estate is the AJ Julia Street Park. This park offers a serene retreat for locals and visitors alike, with lush greenery and recreational facilities. View AJ Julia Street Park on Google Maps.
