= Jewish Report =

South African newspaper

- Cover of the April 2009 Passover Edition
- Type: Weekly
- Editor: Peta Krost Maunder
- Founded: May 1998
- Language: English
- Headquarters: Johannesburg, South Africa
- Circulation: 50,000
- OCLC number: 124002401
- Website: sajr.co.za

The South African Jewish Report is a weekly publication of the Jewish community in South Africa.
