= Orthodox yeshivas in South Africa =

List of Orthodox yeshivot in South Africa:

- Kollel Bet Mordechai
- Kollel Yad Shaul
- Lubavitch Yeshiva Gedolah of Johannesburg
- Ohr Somayach, South Africa
- Rabbinical College of Pretoria
- Rabbinical College of South Africa
- Yeshiva of Cape Town
- Yeshivah Gedolah of Johannesburg
- Yeshiva Maharsha Beis Aharon
- Yeshiva Pri Eitz Chaim (inactive)
- Yeshiva South Africa

== See also ==
- Jewish education in South Africa
