= Rabbinical College of Pretoria =

- Type: Private yeshiva
- Established: 2001
- Religious affiliation: Charedi Judaism
- Location: 246 Schroder St, Groenkloof, Pretoria, Gauteng, 0027, South Africa; 25°46′34″S 28°13′58″E

The Rabbinical College of Pretoria - Hebrew, Yeshiva LeRabbonus Pretoria - is a Jewish Chabad Yeshiva in Pretoria, South Africa. The Yeshiva was established in 2001 under the inspiration of late Chief Rabbi Cyril Harris. It was originally headed by Rabbi Levi Wineberg, and was then named Machon l'Hora'ah. In 2015, Rabbi Chaim Finkelstein became rosh yeshiva (dean), along with Dayan Gidon Fox.

The offering comprises a two-year semicha (ordination) programme. Additional to the standard topics, the first year includes, also, a "pre-semicha" course covering various practical areas of halakha (Jewish Law) and Rabbinics. Students receive their semicha from the Roshei Yeshiva (jointly with the renowned Posek Rabbi Zalman Nechemia Goldberg until his death; and previously Rabbi Yaacov Warhaftig of Machon Ariel in Jerusalem.)

Since the Yeshiva focuses on semicha, students have studied at other institutions for several years prior to joining the programme. The students also teach, studying individually with members of Pretoria's synagogue. An initiative within the curriculum is the "discovery" program, based in the African bushveld.

== See also ==
- Jewish education in South Africa under History of the Jews in South Africa
- Rabbinical College of South Africa
- Lubavitch Yeshiva Gedolah of Johannesburg
- Orthodox yeshivas in South Africa
- Tomchei Temimim
- Yeshiva Gedolah (Chabad-Lubavitch)
