= Torah Academy School, Johannesburg =

The Torah Academy
- Johannesburg, Gauteng; South Africa

Information
- Type: Independent, Single-sex educational, Day School
- Religious affiliation: Jewish (Chabad Lubavitch)
- Dean: Rabbi D. Hazdan
- Enrollment: K-12
- Website: www.torahacademy.co.za

The Torah Academy is a Chabad Jewish day school in Johannesburg, South Africa. It comprises a boys' high school, a girls' high school (on a separate campus), a primary school and a nursery school. The Mission of the school is to "provide and promote the highest quality Jewish and general education to a diverse community of Jewish children... [and] to cultivate students to reach personal excellence, and to be responsible members of society." Although the school is Chassidic Orthodox, families of all levels of observance are welcomed.

The school provides a Kodesh (Jewish Studies) curriculum "combined with a strong secular studies program within a single framework." Kodesh studies comprise Torah (Chumash, Navi, Mishna and Talmud), Halacha (Jewish law), Hebrew language, and Jewish History; at the Boy's High School, studies are within a Mesivta environment. The secular program follows the national and provincial standards, and students are fully prepared for writing "Matric"; pass rate are generally very high, and students often achieve competitively in these exams. The main campus, purchased in 1980, comprises a stone building with stained glass windows on approximately 11 acres (45,000 m^{2}) of lawns and gardens, playing fields, including netball, basketball and soccer fields, recreational facilities, classrooms, a computer/media centre, science laboratory, and a pre-school department. On campus there is also "Lubavitch House", which contains the offices of the dean and administrator, with boardrooms, a printing room, and a dining room and kitchen. The Torah Academy Shul, serving the (Chabad) community in that area of Johannesburg, is also on campus.

== See also ==
- Jewish education in South Africa under History of the Jews in South Africa
- Lubavitch Yeshiva Gedolah of Johannesburg
- Rabbinical College of South Africa
- Beth Rivkah § Other secondary schools
