= History of the Jews in South Africa =

South African Jews
Suid-Afrikaanse Jode AmaJuda aseNingizimu Afrika

Regions with significant populations
- South Africa: estimated 52,300
- City of Johannesburg: 30,000 (57.5%)
- City of Cape Town: 12,500 (23.9%)
- Durban/Umhlangla - eThekwini: 3,400 (6.5%)
- East Rand – Ekurhuleni: 3,400 (6.5%)
- Western Cape Province (other than Cape Town): 1,000 (2.0%)
- Pretoria – City of Tshwane: 900 (1.7%)
- Gauteng Province (other than Johannesburg, Pretoria and East Rand): 700 (1.3%)
- Eastern Cape Province (other than Port Elizabeth): 700 (1.4%)
- Free State Province: 500 (1.0%)
- KwaZulu-Natal Province (other than Durban): 400 (0.8%)
- Other (In South Africa): 300 (0.9%)
- Israel: 20,000
- Australia: 15,000

Languages
- First language South African English (vast majority) and Afrikaans, of religious: Yiddish, Hebrew Minority: Other Languages of South Africa

Religion
- Orthodox Judaism (80%); Reform Judaism (20%)

Related ethnic groups
- Afrikaner-Jews; Lithuanian Jews; Dutch Jews; British Jews; Portuguese Jews; Anglo-Israelis

South African Jews, whether by culture, ethnicity, or religion, form the twelfth largest Jewish community in the world, and the largest on the African continent. As of 2020, the Kaplan Centre at the University of Cape Town estimates 52,300 Jews in the country. The South African Jewish Board of Deputies estimates that the figure is closer to 75,000. As of 2026, the Jewish Agency for Israel estimates that the figure is 61,000.

The history of the Jews in South Africa began during the period of Portuguese exploration in the early modern era, though a permanent presence was not established until the beginning of Dutch colonisation in the region. During the period of British colonial rule in the 19th century, the Jewish South African community expanded greatly, in part thanks to encouragement from Britain. From 1880 to 1914, the Jewish population in South Africa grew from 4,000 to over 40,000. South African Jews have played an important role in promoting diplomatic and military relations between Israel and South Africa. South Africa's Jewish community peaked in the 1970s with an estimated 120,000 Jews living in the country. The Soweto uprising in 1976 and racial tensions led to an increase in Jewish emigration. Since the end of apartheid, Jews have continued to emigrate, mostly to developed countries in the English-speaking world such as the United States, Canada, the United Kingdom, Australia, and New Zealand, as well as a significant number emigrating to Israel. As of 2021, it is estimated that 92% of the Jewish population on the African continent is concentrated in South Africa.

== History ==
=== Portuguese exploration ===
The first Jews involved in the history of South Africa were explorers, cartographers and astronomers who were employed by the Portuguese Crown. These men were employed in attempts by Portugal to discover a sea route to the Indian subcontinent. Jewish cartographers in Portugal assisted explorers Bartolomeu Dias and Vasco da Gama who sailed around the Cape of Good Hope to India in 1488 and 1497, respectively.

=== Dutch colonial era ===
In 1652, the Dutch East India Company (VOC) established a colonial settlement at the Cape of Good Hope under the direction of Jan van Riebeeck. Among the settlers in the colony were a number of non-practising Jews who lived in Cape Town. The first records of Jews living in the colony were a baptism record of two Jewish settlers living in the Western Cape on Christmas Day, 1669. Despite this, Jewish immigration to the colony remained small in number due to the VOC requiring all its employees and settlers to be Protestant. In 1803, the Dutch colonial authorities granted religious freedom to all inhabitants and prospective migrants; when the British invaded and occupied the colony in 1805, they issued a confirmation of this policy the next year.

=== British colonial era ===
Jews did not arrive in significant numbers at Cape Town before the 1820s. The first congregation in South Africa, the Gardens Shul, was founded in Cape Town in September 1841. The first service was held on the eve of Yom Kippur (Day of Atonement) at the home of Benjamin Norden on the corner of Weltevreden and Hof streets. Benjamin Norden, Simeon Markus, together with a score of others arriving in the early 1820s and '30s, were commercial pioneers, especially the Mosenthal brothers—Julius, Adolph (see Aliwal North), and James Mosenthal, who established a major wool industry. By bringing in thirty Angora goats from Asia in 1856 they became the founders of the mohair industry.

Aaron and Daniel de Pass were the first to open up Namaqualand. From 1849 to 1886 they were the largest shipowners in Cape Town, and leaders of the sealing, whaling, and fishing industries. Jews were among the first to engage in ostrich-farming and played a role in the early diamond industry.

Jews also played a part in early South African politics. Julius Mosenthal (1818–1880), brother of the poet Salomon Hermann Mosenthal of Vienna, was a member of the Cape Parliament in the 1850s. Simeon Jacobs (1832–1883), was a judge in the Supreme Court of the Cape of Good Hope. As the acting attorney-general of Cape Colony, he introduced the Cape Colony Responsible Government Bill and the Voluntary Bill (abolishing state aid to the Anglican Church) in 1872. Saul Solomon, leader of the Cape Colony Liberal Party, has been called the "Cape Disraeli." He was invited into the first Responsible government, formed by Sir John Molteno, and declined the premiership itself several times.

At the same time, the Jews faced substantial antisemitism. Though freedom of worship was granted to all residents in 1870, the revised Grondwet of 1894 still debarred Jews and Catholics from military posts, from the positions of president, state secretary, or magistrate, from membership in the First and Second Volksraad ("parliament"), and from superintendencies of natives and mines. These positions were restricted to persons above 30 years of age with permanent property and a longer history of settlement.

All schools taught in a Christian and Protestant spirit. Before the Boer War (1899–1902), Jews were considered uitlanders ("foreigners") and excluded from the mainstream of South African life.

A small number of Jews who settled among the rural white Afrikaans-speaking population became known as Boerejode (Boer Jews). Instances of intermarriage were generally accepted.

After the South African gold rush began in 1886, the number of Jews rose. In 1880, the Jewish population numbered approximately 4,000; by 1914 it had grown to more than 40,000. So many of them came from Lithuania that some referred to the population as a colony of Lithuania; Johannesburg was also occasionally called "Jewburg".

==== Second Boer War ====
Jews fought on both sides during the Second Boer War (1899–1902), and Jewish soldiers, such as British Army officer Karrie Davies, participated in some of the most significant engagements of the conflict, including the siege of Ladysmith. Nearly 2,800 Jews fought in the war on the British side, and The Spectator reported that 125 of them were killed in action during the conflict. On the opposing side, roughly 300 Jews served on the Boer side; collectively they were known as the Boerjode (Boer Jews). Jews who lived in the Transvaal and South African Republics and held citizenship rights were conscripted along with other residents of the republics (known as burghers), though other Jews volunteered. Jews fighting on the Boer side participated in many of the major engagements of the war, and continued to fight in the guerrilla phase of the conflict as bittereinders; 12 Boerjode are known to have been killed in action, while 80 were captured by the British. Captured Boerjode were held in prisoner-of-war camps in South Africa, Ceylon, Saint Helena, Bermuda and India.

=== Union of South Africa ===
During this era the South African Jewish politician Morris Alexander would be a notable community figure. In 1906 he helped pass a law that had Yiddish reclassified as a European language as opposed to a Semitic one. This prevented Yiddish speaking Jewish immigrants from being stopped on racial ground, which has been a frequent occurrence.

Although South African Jews were granted equal rights after the Second Boer War, they again became subject of persecution in the days leading up to the Second World War. In 1930, the Quota Act, passed by the South African government, was intended to curtail the immigration of Jews into South Africa. The vast majority of Jews immigrating to South Africa during this period came from Lithuania. The census of 1936 recorded a total of 17,684 Yiddish speakers in the Union of South Africa with 11,528 of them living in the Transvaal. The 1937 Aliens Act, motivated by a sharp increase the previous year in the number of German Jewish refugees coming to South Africa, brought such migration to almost a complete halt. Some Jews were able to enter the country, but many were unable to do so. A total of approximately six-and-a-half thousand Jews came to South Africa from Germany between the years 1933 and 1939. During this period, many Afrikaners sympathised with Nazi Germany due to their anti-British sentiment, and organisations such as Louis Weichardt's "Grayshirts" and the pro-Nazi Ossewabrandwag were openly antisemitic. In the South African Parliament, the opposition National Party argued that the Aliens Act was too lenient and advocated a complete ban on Jewish immigration, a halt in the naturalisation of Jewish permanent residents of South Africa and the banning of Jews from certain professions.

After the war, the situation began to improve, and a large number of South African Jews emigrated to Israel. South African Jews in Israel number around 20,000 in the 21st century. During this time, there were also two waves of Jewish immigration to Africa from the island of Rhodes, first in the 1900s and then after 1960.

In this period, Jewish activism in South Africa also included attempts to secure the position of Jews overseas. In 1933, following the rise of the Nazi Party in Germany, a correspondent for the South African Medical Journal reported on the systematic oppression of Jewish medical professionals in Germany. These actions included denial of graduations for Jewish medical students, employment bans, forced resignations, raids on a Jewish medical association, and violent attacks on individual doctors. The report concluded that the actions of the Nazi regime likely had the tacit support of the German medical establishment and ended with the request that South African doctors protest the actions.

=== Economic Opportunities ===
Despite the obvious hardships and challenges they faced as immigrants, members of the South African Jewish community found their place in the South African economy and workforce. In the 19th century, many Jews worked as smouse (itinerant merchants) trading in remote rural regions. Following the discoveries of diamonds and gold, Jewish immigrants found opportunities in related economic sectors such as retail, mining, and manufacturing. As time went on, many Jewish South Africans achieved success in professional fields such as law, banking, and medicine. This can be attributed to accessible education, mutual aid networks, and hard work.

=== Development of the South African Jewish Cultural Identity ===
South African Jewish Cultural Identity has developed with time between an interesting dynamic of community traditions, support, assimilation and adaptation into South Africa as a whole. As Jews immigrated to South Africa primarily from Eastern Europe, the large majority consider themselves to be Ashkenazi Jews. They brought over many specific traditions and practices both religiously and culturally that have created a foundation for the modern day South African Jewish community, primarily concentrated in larger cities of South Africa such as Cape Town and Johannesburg. As the community continued developing with time, Jewish institutions such as Jewish Day Schools, cultural community centers, and synagogues developed as well. These institutions played a major role in the development of a united identity, unique to South African Jewry, finding a place for Jews in South African society even under an Apartheid Government. An array of Jewish newspapers, magazines and other publications were established, for example the Afrikaner Yidishe Tsaytung, existing through 1931-1985, with a weekly readership of 3000 at its peak. In a Post-Apartheid reality, South African Jews have managed to properly integrate themselves into discussions of current events as the country continues to heal from overcoming such violent oppression for many years. Many South African Jews tend to link themselves to human rights discussions and initiatives to continue working towards equality in a country with such intense history. All of these developments have extremely shaped how we can see the South African Jewish Cultural Identity as it is today.

=== Post-World War II Integration ===
==== Education ====
Despite the previously mentioned sympathy and support many Afrikaners had for Nazi Germany, thousands of Jews within South Africa began to integrate into urban life. Despite this urban integration of Jewish immigrants, many Jewish families sent their children to separate educational institutions. This separation within the education system was intensified due to the Christian National Education protocols implemented in South Africa around the 1950's. Christian anti-Semitism became a driving factor for keeping Jewish youth out of specific aspects of public life in South Africa. By 1970, the Jewish Educational Institutions within major urban hotspots around South Africa had become the primary source of education for majority of South African Jews.

=== Apartheid era ===
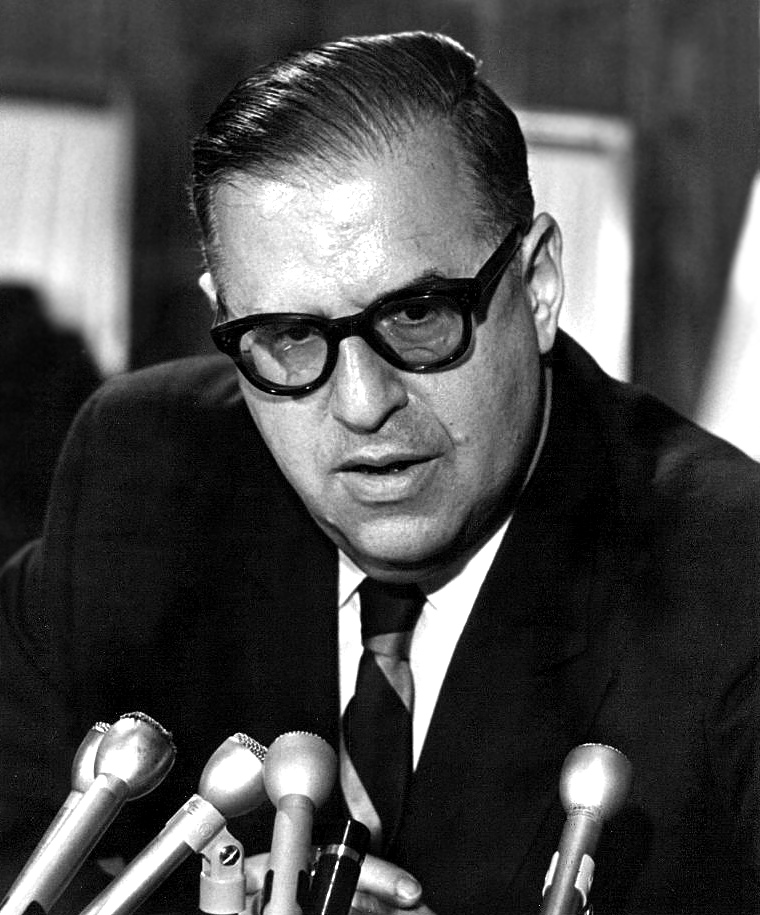
Abba Eban, born in Cape Town, was Foreign Minister of Israel from 1966 to 1974.

When the Afrikaner-dominated National Party came to power in 1948 it did not adopt an anti-Jewish policy despite its earlier position. In 1953 South Africa's Prime Minister, D. F. Malan, became the first foreign head of government to visit Israel though the trip was a "private visit" rather than an official state visit. This began a long history of cooperation between Israel and South Africa on many levels. Elements of the South Africa Jewish community through such bodies as the South African Zionist Federation maintained a cordial relationship with the South African government even though it objected to the policies of apartheid being enacted. South Africa's Jews were permitted to collect huge sums of money to be sent on as official aid to Israel, despite strict exchange-control regulations. Per capita, South African Jews were reputedly the most financially supportive Zionists abroad.

Despite the anti-semitism of the ruling National Party, Jewish people were considered as white under the law and shared the same privileges as the Afrikaners. After the Rivonia trial in which Nelson Mandela and several co-defendants, some Jewish, were sentenced to life in prison, the Apartheid government praised then-Attorney general Percy Yutar, who was Jewish as well, and held him as a 'savior of the country.' The Afrikaner National Party government also collaborated with the Israeli government who sold them arms and anti-rioting equipment to suppress Black communities. The apartheid government also secretly worked with Israel to develop a nuclear program.

==== South African Jewish opposition to apartheid ====
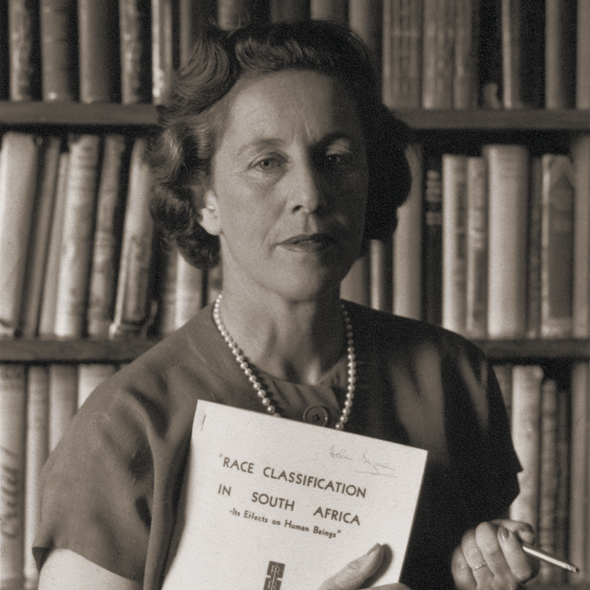
Helen Suzman

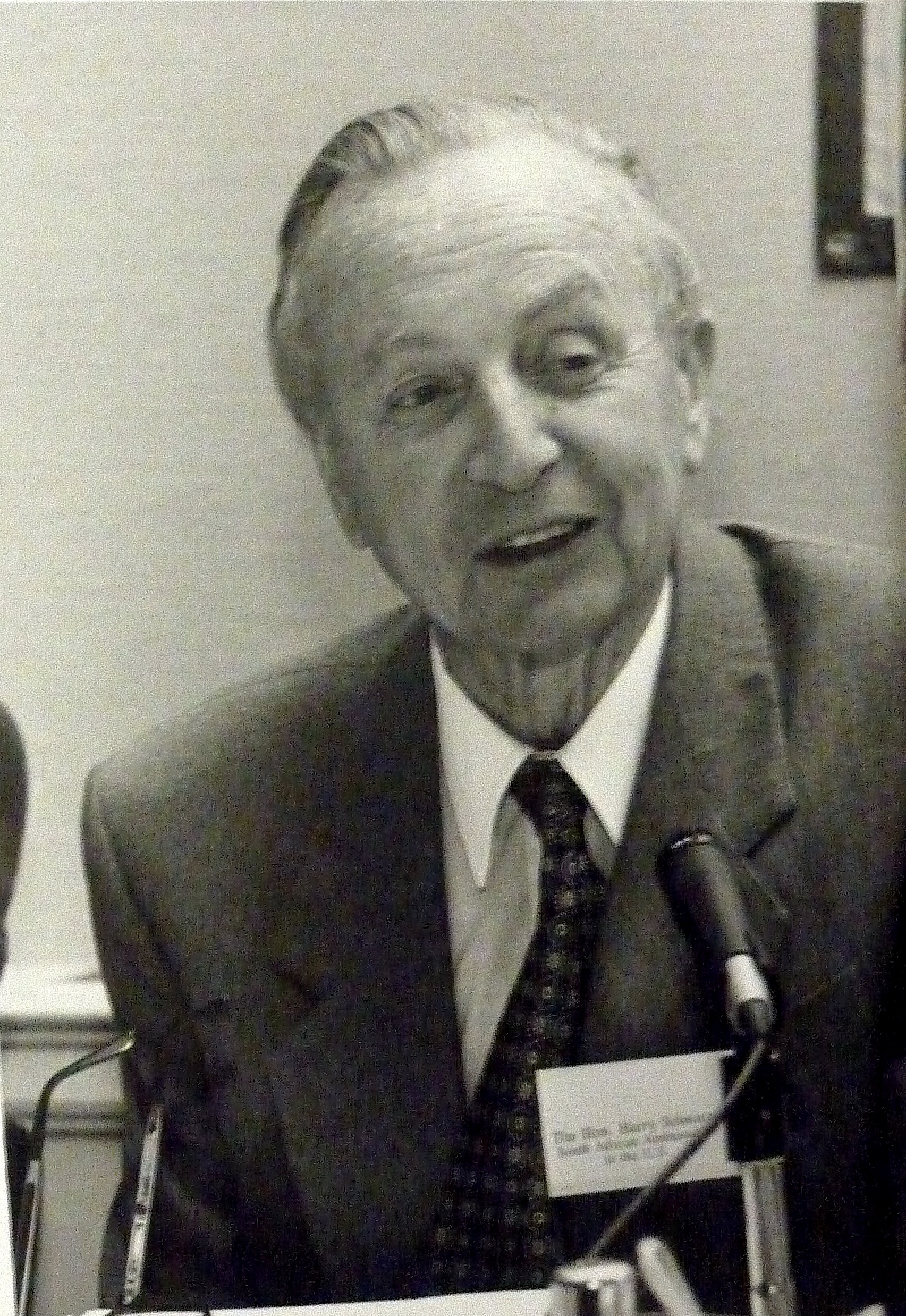
Harry Schwarz

Helen Suzman and Harry Schwarz, who were prominent anti-apartheid campaigners during the 1960s, 1970s and 1980s

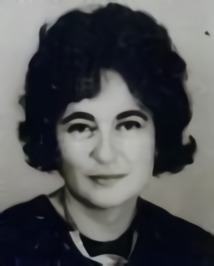
Anti-apartheid activist Ruth First, assassinated by police in 1982

Many Jewish South Africans, both individuals and organisations, helped support the anti-apartheid movement. It was estimated that Jews were disproportionately represented (some sources maintain by as much as 2,500%) among whites involved in anti-apartheid political activities. Much like other English-speaking white South Africans, Jews supported either the Progressive Party or the United Party. One organisation, the Union of Jewish Women, sought to alleviate the suffering of blacks through charitable projects and self-help schemes. Fourteen of the 23 whites involved in the 1956 Treason Trial were Jewish and all five whites of the 17 members of the African National Congress who were arrested for anti-apartheid activities in 1963 were Jewish.

Some Jewish university students vehemently opposed the apartheid movement. A large number of Jews were also involved in organisations such as the Springbok Legion, the Torch Commando and the Black Sash. These anti-apartheid organisations led protests that were both active (e.g. marching through the streets with torches) and passive (e.g. standing silently in black). Two Jewish organisations were formed in 1985: Jews for Justice (in Cape Town) and Jews for Social Justice (in Johannesburg). They tried to reform South African society and build bridges between the white and black communities. The South African Jewish Board also passed a resolution rejecting apartheid in 1985.

In addition to the well-known high-profile Jewish anti-apartheid personalities, there were very many ordinary Jews who expressed their revulsion of apartheid in diverse ways and contributed to its eventual downfall. Many Jews actively provided humanitarian assistance for black communities. Johannesburg's Oxford Synagogue and Cape Town's Temple Israel established nurseries, medical clinics and adult education programs in the townships and provided legal aid for victims of apartheid laws. Many Jewish lawyers acted as nominees for non-whites who were not allowed to buy properties in white areas.

Helen Suzman—the main champion of the liberal Progressive Party—was the only MP consistently voting against apartheid legislation for many years. Suzman's critics argue that she did not achieve any notable political successes, but helped to shore up claims by the Nationalists that internal, public criticism of apartheid was permitted. Suzman's supporters point to her use of her parliamentary privileges to help the poorest and most disempowered South Africans in any way she could.

Harry Schwarz was in minority opposition politics for over 40 years and was one of the most prominent opponents of the National Party and its policy of apartheid. After assisting in the 1948 general election, Schwarz, Uys Krige, Sailor Malan, and others formed the Torch Commando, an ex-soldiers' movement to protest against the disenfranchisement of the coloured people in South Africa. From the 1960s, when he was Leader of the Opposition in the Transvaal, he became well-known and achieved prominence as a race relations and economic reformist in the United Party. As an early and powerful advocate of non-violent resistance, he signed the Mahlabatini Declaration of Faith with Mangosuthu Buthelezi in 1974, which enshrined the principles of peaceful negotiated transition of power and equality for all. It was the first of such agreements by black and white political leaders in South Africa. In 1975 he led a breakaway from the United Party due to its ineffective approach to criticism of apartheid, and became leader of the new Reform Party that led to the realignment of opposition politics in South Africa. Schwarz was one of the defence attorneys in the Rivonia Trial who defended Jimmy Kantor, Nelson Mandela's lawyer until he was also arrested and charged. Through the 1970s and 1980s Schwarz was amongst the most forthright and effective campaigners against apartheid in Parliament who was feared by many National Party ministers.

In 1980, South Africa's National Congress of the Jewish Board of Deputies passed a resolution urging "all concerned [people] and, in particular, members of our community to cooperate in securing the immediate amelioration and ultimate removal of all unjust discriminatory laws and practices based on race, creed, or colour". This inspired some Jews to intensify their anti-apartheid activism, but the bulk of the community either emigrated or avoided public conflict with the National Party government.

=== Moderation and liberalism ===
South African Jews have a history of political moderation and the majority supported opposition parties such as first the United Party, then the Liberal Party, Progressive Party and its successors during the decades of National Party apartheid rule. (See Liberalism in South Africa). The prime example of the more moderate approach is that of the highly assimilated Harry Oppenheimer (1908–2000) (born Jewish but converted to Anglicanism upon his marriage), the richest man in South Africa and the chairman of the De Beers and Anglo American corporations. He was a supporter of the liberal Progressive Party and its policies, believing that granting more freedom and economic growth to South Africa's Black African majority was good politics and sound economic policy. The banner for this cause was held high by Helen Suzman, as the lone Progressive Party member in South Africa's parliament, representing the voting district of Houghton, home to many wealthy Jewish families at the time. Harry Schwarz, a refugee from Nazi Germany, also played a key role in national opposition to Apartheid and later became South Africa's Ambassador to the US during its transition to democracy. The Progressive Party (later renamed the Democratic Party and then the Democratic Alliance) was later led by Jewish politician, Tony Leon and his successor, Helen Zille. Zille is of Jewish descent: her parents separately left Germany in the 1930s to avoid Nazi persecution (her maternal grandfather and paternal grandmother were Jewish).

In 1980, after 77 years of neutrality, South Africa's National Congress of the Jewish Board of Deputies passed a resolution urging "all concerned [people] and, in particular, members of our community to cooperate in securing the immediate amelioration and ultimate removal of all unjust discriminatory laws and practices based on race, creed, or colour". This inspired some Jews to intensify their anti-apartheid activism, but the bulk of the community either emigrated or avoided public conflict with the National Party government.

The Jewish establishment and the majority of South African Jews remained focused on Jewish issues. A few rabbis spoke out against apartheid early, but they failed to gain support and it was not until 1985 that the rabbinate as a whole condemned apartheid (Adler 2000). The South African Union for Progressive Judaism took the strongest stand of any of the Jewish movements in the country against apartheid. It opposed disinvestment while women in the movement engaged in social work as a form of protest. This includes the Moses Weiler School in Alexandra founded by Rabbi Moses Cyrus Weiler, where for generations the school has been funded and led by women from the Progressive movement, even in opposition to the Bantu Education Act, 1953 (Feld 2014).

Tony Leon who was the Federal Leader of the Democratic Alliance (2000-2007) and Helen Zille from (2007-2015) are both Jewish.

== Today ==
Although the Jewish community peaked in the 1970s (at around 120,000), about 52,000 Jews, mostly nominally Orthodox, remain in South Africa. A proportion are secular, or have converted to Christianity. Despite low intermarriage rates (around 7%), approximately 1,800 Jews emigrate every year, mainly to Israel, Australia, Canada, and the United States. The Jewish community in South Africa is currently the largest in Africa, and, although shrinking due to emigration, it remains one of the most nominally Orthodox communities in the world, although there is a smaller Progressive community, especially in Cape Town. The nation's Progressive communities are represented by the South African Union for Progressive Judaism. The current Orthodox Chief Rabbi, Warren Goldstein (2008), has been widely credited for initiating a "Bill of Responsibilities" which the government has incorporated in the national school curriculum. The Chief Rabbi has also pushed for community run projects to combat crime in the country.

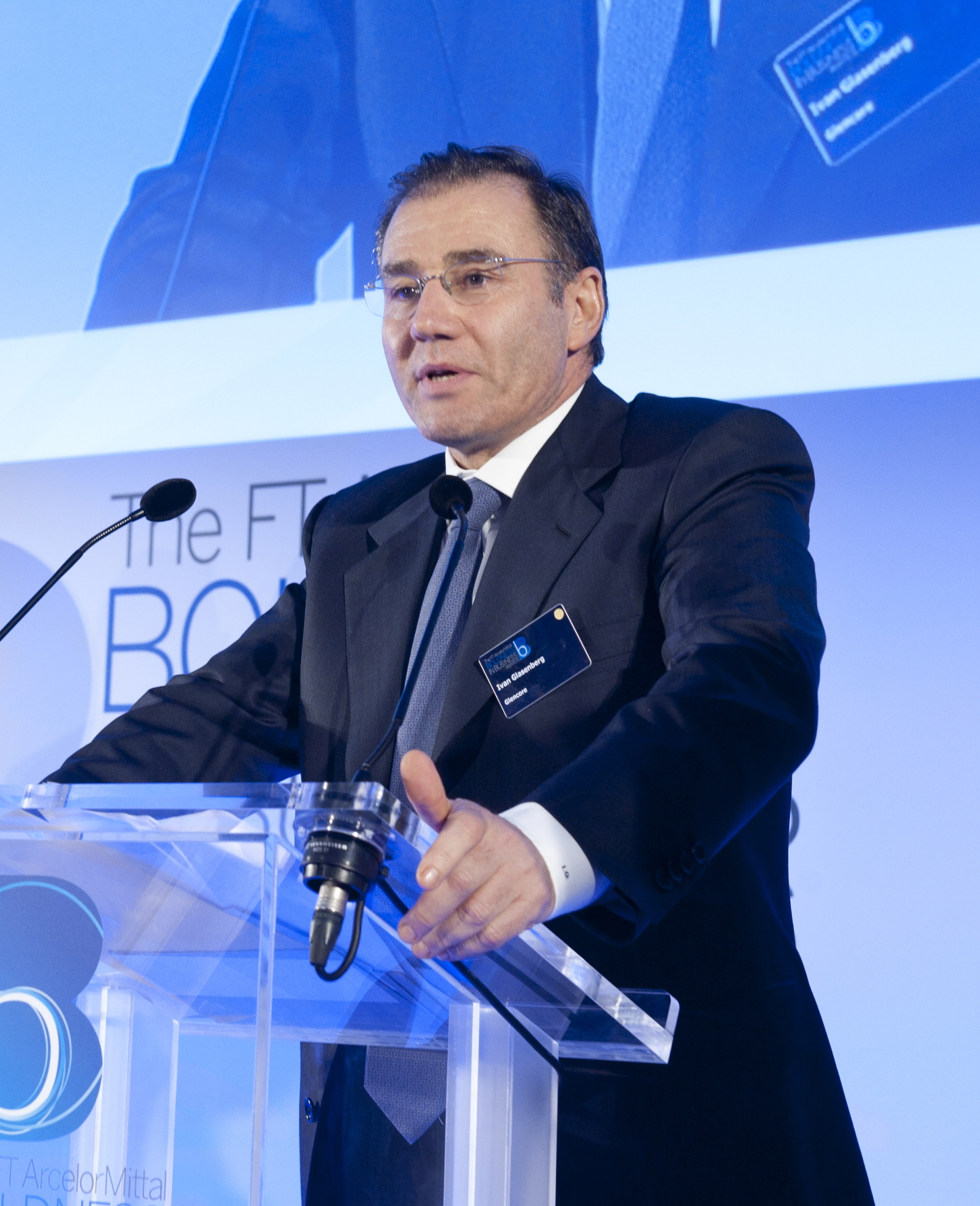
Ivan Glasenberg, CEO of Glencore

The community has become more observant and in Johannesburg, the largest centre of Jewish life with 40,000 Jews, there is a high number and density of kosher restaurants and religious centres. In politics, the Jewish community continues to have influence, particularly in leadership roles. Currently, the sole national Jewish newspaper, with a readership of about 40,000, is the South African Jewish Report. In 2008, a Jewish radio station, ChaiFM, commenced broadcasting in Johannesburg, and also broadcasting on the internet to the large South African "diaspora". Despite a fall in number, since 2003 the number of South African Jews has stabilised.

The 2016 Community Survey mini-census conducted by Statistics South Africa found the largest numbers in the following municipalities: Johannesburg 23,420; Cape Town 12,672; Ethekwini (Durban) 3,599; Ekurhuleni (East Rand) 1,846; Tshwane (Pretoria) 1,579; Nelson Mandela Bay (Port Elizabeth) 623; Msunduzi (Pietermaritzburg) 600; Mangaung (Bloemfontein) 343; Stellenbosch 316; Buffalo City (East London) 251; Mbombela (Nelspruit) 242.

Kosher certification in South Africa plays a significant role in the local Jewish community. Currently, there are three agencies operating in the country, namely the Union of Orthodox Synagogues (UOS) Kosher Division, Kosher Certified South Africa (KCSA), and MK Kosher. These agencies provide certification and supervision services to ensure that food products meet the strict dietary requirements of Jewish law.

== Lemba people ==
The Lemba, Remba, or Mwenye are an ethnic group which is native to South Africa, Malawi, Mozambique and Zimbabwe of mixed Bantu, Ethiopian and Yemeni heritage. Within South Africa, they are particularly concentrated in the Limpopo province (historically around Sekhukuneland) and the Mpumalanga province.

Since the late twentieth century, there has been increased media and scholarly attention about the Lemba's claim of common descent from First Temple-era Jews. Genetic Y-DNA analyses have established a paternal Middle-Eastern origin for the majority of the Lemba population.

== Jewish education in South Africa ==
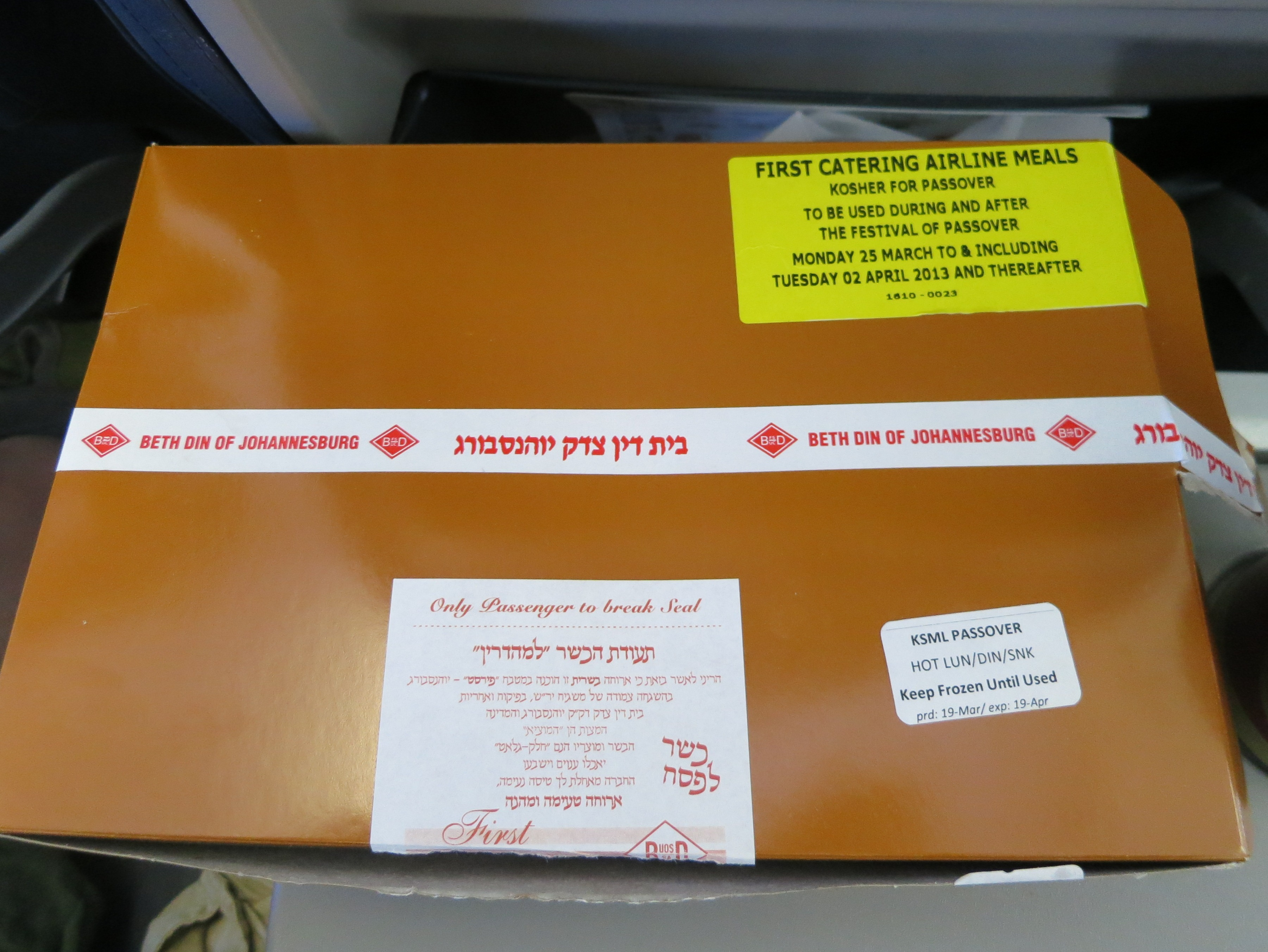
Kosher meal approved by the Beth din of Johannesburg

Traditionally, Jewish education in South Africa was conducted by the Cheder or Talmud Torah, while children received secular education at government and private schools. There were, initially, no formal structures in place for Rabbinical education. (Note that although the majority of South Africa's Jews are descendants of Lithuanian Jews who venerated Talmudic scholarship, the community did not establish schools or yeshivot for several decades.)

An important change took place in 1947, when King David School was established as the first full-time dual-curriculum (secular and Jewish) Jewish day school – the high school was established in 1955. Today, the King David schools are, combined, amongst the largest Jewish day schools in the world. King David's equivalent in Cape Town is "Herzlia" (United Herzlia Schools) with Carmel School in Pretoria and Durban (both subsequently renamed), and the Theodor Herzl School in Port Elizabeth (est. 1959). Umhlanga Jewish Day School (subsequently renamed), was opened in January 2012, to cater for Jewish children in the greater Durban area. In total, nineteen Day Schools, affiliated to the South African Board of Jewish Education, have been established in the main centres.

The first religious day school, the Yeshiva College of South Africa, was established in the mid-1950s, drawing primarily on the popularity of the Bnei Akiva Religious Zionist youth movement. As an institution with hundreds of pupils, Yeshivah College is today the largest religious school in the country, with Torah studied alongside the national curriculum. Other educational institutions sharing this same Religious Zionist / Modern Orthodox ideology include the kollel (Bet Mordechai) and midrasha (Emunah) of Mizrachi, Johannesburg, and the Yeshiva of Cape Town, a Torah MiTzion kollel. Cape Town also has the Phyllis Jowell Jewish Day School and Cape Town Torah High, both schools integrating Torah studies. Rabbi Avraham Tanzer, Rosh Yeshiva at Yeshiva College for over 50 years, is credited with the growth of that school and its associated institutions, but more broadly, with the "massive sea change for the South African Jewish community and for its spiritual development".

In parallel to the establishment of Yeshiva College, and drawing on the same momentum, several smaller yeshivot were opened, starting in the 1960s. The Yeshivah Gedolah of Johannesburg, established in 1973 by Rabbi Azriel Goldfein, is the best known of these, having trained dozens of South African Rabbis, including Chief Rabbi Dr Warren Goldstein. The Yeshiva follows the "Telshe" educational model, although accommodates students from across the spectrum of Hashkafa.

This era also saw the start of a large network of Chabad-Lubavitch activities and institutions. There is today a Lubavitch Yeshiva in Johannesburg (Lubavitch Yeshiva Gedolah of Johannesburg) serving the Chabad community, a Chabad Semicha programme in Pretoria (having ordained 98 Rabbis since its establishment in 2001), and Lubavitch Day schools in Johannesburg (the Torah Academy school) and Cape Town. Johannesburg boasts ten Chabad Houses, Cape Town two and Kwazulu-Natal one, all of which offer a variety of Torah classes and adult education and informal children's education programmes.

The 1970s saw the establishment of a Haredi kollel, Yad Shaul, as well as the growth of a large baal teshuva movement, with other yeshivas established also. This was supported by the Israel-based organisations Ohr Somayach and Aish HaTorah, which established active branches in South Africa in the 1980s and 1990s (Arachim had an active presence then also). Notable figures such as Moshe Sternbuch and Aharon Pfeuffer played a major role in the Haredi community at that time, with Akiva Tatz being an especially popular speaker. Yad Shaul was led by Boruch Grossnass for over 40 years.

There are today several Haredi boys' schools in Johannesburg, each associated with one of the yeshivot, as well as 2 Beis Yaakov girls' school . Ohr Somayach, South Africa operates a full-time Yeshiva in Johannesburg – with its bet midrash established in 1990, and its kollel (Toras Chaim) in 1996 – as well as a midrasha; it also runs a bet midrash in Cape Town. Aish HaTorah emphasizes student-focused programming – lectures and retreats, as well as various group trips to Israel – and also runs a community synagogue for singles and young marrieds. As of 2025 there are 6 full-time yeshivos and numerous kollelim in South Africa; see Orthodox yeshivas in South Africa.

The Progressive Movement maintains a network of supplementary Hebrew and Religious classes at its temples. These schools are all affiliated to the SA Union for Progressive Judaism. Rabbi Sa'ar Shaked, congregational rabbi of Beit Emanuel is currently involved in efforts to establish a Rabbinic Academy and Higher Education Institution in Gauteng.

Conservative / Masorti's presence in South Africa is limited to one synagogue in Johannesburg.

Limmud was introduced to the country in 2007. The Limmud South Africa conferences are held in August/September each year. South Africa's Orthodox rabbis do not participate, unlike the UK's Orthodox Rabbinate part of whom have taken part in Limmud UK; see Limmud § Relationships with Orthodoxy in Britain.

== See also ==
- History of the Jews in Africa

=== Regions ===
- History of the Jews in Central Africa
- History of the Jews in East Africa
- History of the Jews in North Africa
- History of the Jews in Southern Africa
- History of the Jews in West Africa

=== Topics ===
- Antisemitism in South Africa
- Afrikaner-Jews
- Chief Rabbi of South Africa
- Jewish Report
- South African Jewish Maritime League
- Gerim

== Bibliography ==
- Adler, Franklin Hugh (2000) (Adler, F.H. (2000). "South African Jews and Apartheid". Patterns of Prejudice. 34 (4). Informa UK Limited: 23–36. doi:10.1080/003132200128810973. ISSN 0031-322X. S2CID 145724288.)
- Kaplan, Mendel (1991). Robertson, Marian (ed.). Founders and Followers: Johannesburg Jewry 1887-1915. Cape Town: Vlaeerg Publishers. ISBN 978-0-947461-09-6.
- Feld, Marjorie N. (2013). Nations Divided: American Jews and the Struggle over Apartheid. Palgrave Macmillan. p. 191. ISBN 978-1-137-02972-0.
- Saron, Gustav (2001). Musiker, Naomi (ed.). The Jews of South Africa: An Illustrated History to 1953. Metuchen, N.J.: Scarecrow Press; in association with the South African Jewish Board of Deputies. ISBN 978-0-620-27097-7.
- Shain, Milton; Mendelsohn, Richard (2008). The Jews in South Africa: An Illustrated History. Jeppestown: Jonathan Ball Publishers. ISBN 978-1-86842-281-4.
- Shimoni, Gideon (1980). Jews and Zionism: The South African Experience 1910-1967. Cape Town: Oxford University Press. ISBN 978-0-19-570179-1.
- Shimoni, Gideon (2003). Community and Conscience: The Jews and Apartheid South Africa. Hanover, N.H.: University Press of New England. ISBN 978-1-58465-329-5.
