= South African Jewish Board of Deputies =

Representative institution for South African Jews

- Formation: 1912
- Founded: 1912; 114 years ago
- Legal status: Active
- Headquarters: Johannesburg, South Africa
- Region served: South Africa
- National Director: Wendy Kahn
- National President: Zev Krengel
- Website: https://www.sajbd.org/

The South African Jewish Board of Deputies (SAJBD) is the largest Jewish communal and civil rights organisation in South Africa. It was formed in 1912 from the merger of the Board for the Transvaal and the Board for the Cape. It serves as the central representative institution of most of the country's Hebrew congregations, Jewish societies, and institutions.It is affiliated to the World Jewish Congress.

During much of the National Party rule, the Board adopted a policy of non-intervention, or neutrality towards the system of Apartheid. However, in 1985, it passed a resolution condemning apartheid. The Board has since expressed regret concerning its earlier stance of neutrality and has honoured Jewish anti-apartheid activists in its conferences.

The Board has historically been Zionist. It has also historically supported a two-state solution, advocating for a negotiated settlement between Israel and a future Palestinian state.

== History ==
=== Early history (1898-1948) ===
The board is predated by another Jewish communal organisation, the South African Zionist Federation (formed in 1898), and Dan Jacobson explains: "It is a measure of the enthusiasm of South African Jewry for the Zionist cause that it had a single body uniting its various Zionist groups some years before a similar body [SABJD] devoted to local affairs could be formed."

In 1923, the board adopted a resolution in protest against immigration restrictions mostly targeting Jewish migrants. In response to the Quota Act of 1930 that would effectively deny Eastern European Jewish migration to South Africa, the board's secretary, Harry Carter, proposed a day of mourning and prayer on its day of enactment.

In 1926, the board advocated for the end of discrimination against Jewish teachers that were not being seriously considered for positions in government schools. The following year the board advocated for the end of discrimination against Jewish students applying to certain schools in Johannesburg.

In 1931, amid an economic depression in South Africa, the board launched a fundraising campaign to raise $150, 000 to benefit impoverished local Jewry.

In 1940, the board condemned the “narrow and exclusively racial approach” of the recently formed Afrikaner Economic Institute, cautioning that such an approach would lead to boycotts.

In 1948, the board condemned the withdrawal of US political support for the United Nations Partition Plan for Palestine.

=== Apartheid era (1948-1994) ===
In 1949, the board sponsored a Jewish art exhibition, with 250 original works by both local Jewish artists and those overseas, as well as works on Jewish themes, including a work by Rembrandt.

In 1949, the board responded to an attack by Minister of Justice, C. R. Swart on a political meeting, with Swart alleging that a board member was in attendance. M. Kuper, chairman of the board, confirmed that the allegation was false, as the man named by Swart was not a board member. Kuper also added that the board does not take a stance on national party politics. He affirmed that the board's scope was to protect the civil rights of Jewish citizens and protect them from discrimination and antisemitism.

In 1951, the board supported Israel's claims for reparations from Germany, that culminated in the Reparations Agreement between Israel and the Federal Republic of Germany.

In 1955, the board opened the country's first Jewish museum in their new headquarters in Johannesburg. Chief Rabbi Louis Rabinowitz, officiated at the opening ceremony, adding that it would be a “cultural stimulus” to local Jewry. The decision to open the museum came after the board received a gift of Jewish ceremonial silver objects from the Jewish Reconstruction Foundation.

In 1952, the board distanced itself from an allegation in a police report that it controls the South African Communist Party. The police report had quoted Jewish anti-apartheid activist, Michael Harmel as its source. As early as the late 1950s, Jewish anti-apartheid activists had brought anti-apartheid resolutions to the board of deputies that were routinely voted down. Benjamin Pogrund alleged that the board played a role in defending Pretoria's ties with Israel ties and in supporting the government. The board, at times, distanced itself from the activities and views of individuals Jewish activists, asserting the board's political neutrality on national politics. The editor and board associate director, David Saks, wrote about the context of the distancing. Saks highlighted the lack of meaningful Jewish identification among some of the activists. He cited Ray Alexander Simons, who rejected identifying as Jewish, instead seeing herself as primarily an "internationalist" (citizen of the world). Saks also explained that disagreements were not exclusively rooted in discussions of national politics. Anti-zionist positions among some radical activists, scornful attitudes towards Judaism and an unwillingness to promote Jewish education to their offspring, were among the differences between the board and the activists.

In 1960, the board assisted Jewish refugees from the Congo with urgent support and ensuring that they had housing in either South Africa or Southern Rhodesia. In the same year, the board, together with the Board of Deputies of British Jews and B'nai B'rith submitted a memorandum to the United Nations. The report demonstrated an anti-Jewish emigration policy maintained by the Soviet Union and North Africa governments.

In 1961, when the board's vice-president, Israel A. Maisels, was appointed Judge of the High Court of Southern Rhodesia in 1961, he was described by The Guardian newspaper as a strong foe of apartheid who has championed the rights of the African in South Africa. During a farewell speech of the same year, Maisels said: “Jewish organizations, of course, cannot take sides and may not throw themselves into political affairs. That is a different thing from saying that Jewish citizens must keep out of such affairs. This attitude is morally indefensible and ethically wrong. I do not exclude the Jewish clergy. Ethics cannot be confined to the walls of synagogues.”

In 1962, the board urged parliament to consider legislation that would prevent the publication of anti-semitic material in the country.

In 1968, the board condemned comments made by Police and Home Affair Minister, Lourens Muller. Muller reportedly warned Jewish parents to do more to ensure that their children do not get involved in student protests against government policies. The board wrote in a statement: “to fasten responsibility on the Jewish community for actions of individual members inevitably furthers anti-Semitism, even if unwittingly.”

In 1972, the board responded to international press reports of a speech made by Prime Minister B.J. Vorster where he referred to the board as a "secret society". Upon a careful reading of the speech, the board determined that Vorster did not intend to criticise the board when he drew parallels with the Broederbond.

The board officially condemned apartheid in 1985, having previously maintained a neutral position on national politics. Upon the release of Nelson Mandela from jail in 1990, the board published a statement in support of the decision: “It earnestly hopes Mr. Mandela will use his considerable political experience and wisdom for creating a suitable climate for reconciliation and negotiation, which would be to the benefit of all peoples of South Africa regardless of race, color or creed."

In 1992, the board urged Jewish voters to vote "yes" in the 1992 South African apartheid referendum, in response to the ballot question “Do you support continuation of the reform process which the state president began on Feb. 2, 1990 and which is aimed at a new constitution through negotiations?” Later that year, Nelson Mandela On the eve of Passover in 1992, Nelson Mandela conveyed a message to the board, publicly acknowledging South African Jewry's “particularly outstanding contribution” to his people's “struggle for freedom and social justice.”

In 1993, the board led a delegation of Jewish leaders paying their respects at a Soweto stadium for the slain political leader, Chris Hani.

=== Post-apartheid era (1994-present) ===
In 1996, the board criticised Mandela for meeting with Nation of Islam leader, Louis Farrakhan on his African tour. In a statement, the board said that it: “would have preferred it if our esteemed president – who is the world symbol of reconciliation and nonracialism – would not have met with Minister Farrakhan.”

In 1998, Thabo Mbeki addressed the board's 38th national biennial congress. Mbeki called on the community to play a role in the growth of the country, share knowledge, skills and other resources in the young democracy. In 1999, Russell Gaddin, national chairman of the board; and Marlene Bethlehem, national president of the board, accompanied Nelson Mandela on an official visit to Israel.

In 2000, the three most prominent Jewish organisations in the body joined to form an umbrella group. The board joined with the South African Zionist Federation and the Israel United Appeal-United Communal Fund amid a decline in the Jewish population.

In 2006, the board criticised the intention of then-president, Thabo Mbeki to meet with Hamas. Mbeki subsequently decided not to meet with the group.

In 2008, the board criticised an initiative, Project Sydney, of the New South Wales Jewish Communal Appeal and the New South Wales Jewish Board of Deputies to assist with the emigration of South African Jewry to Australia. The initiative involved representatives travelling to South Africa to meet with Jewish families considering emigration.

In 2011, the Garden Route Jewish Association affiliated with the board, amid an increase in the Garden Route Jewish population since the late 1980s.

In 2011, the board honoured Jewish anti-apartheid activists, Arthur Goldreich at its national conference. At the conference, a new book, edited by David Saks, associate director of the board of deputies, was launched. The book, titled, "Jewish Memories of Mandela," looks at the role of Jews in the life of Mandela and the broader anti-apartheid struggle.

In his address to the 2015 Biennial National Conference of the South African Jewish Board of Deputies, South African President Jacob Zuma credited the South African Jewish community's historical role in resisting apartheid.

In 2020, the trade unionist, Tony Ehrenreich, apologised to the board after a long running dispute dating back to 2014. Ehrenreich had posted a comment inciting violence and hatred against the board. The South African Human Rights Commission subsequently upheld a complaint of hate speech lodged by the board and ordered Ehrenreich to make an apology.

The board opposes South Africa's genocide case against Israel. The board published a statement on 11 January 2024, accusing the South African government of "inverting reality by accusing Israel of genocide". The board also condemned the involvement of Jeremy Corbyn in the South African delegation and criticised the government's relationship with Hamas.

In the wake of the October 7 attack in Israel, Wendy Kahn, National Director of the SABJD, travelled to Washington DC in April 2024. Kahn met with the White House National Security Council to discuss challenges facing South African Jewry. She also met with the Special Envoy to Monitor and Combat Antisemitism Deborah Lipstadt, Representative Kathy Manning, the office of Senator Jacky Rosen, and the House of Representatives Africa Subcommittee.

In May 2024, the board condemned President Cyril Ramaphosa for chanting "from the river to the sea". The board released a statement: "The call to remove all Jews from the Jordan River to the Mediterranean Sea equates to removing all Jews from Israel. The slogan and its call for the destruction of the Jewish state has its origin in the Hamas Charter, with its goal to see Israel as 'Judenfrei’ or Jew-free."

== Activities and positions ==
The issues which the board states it addresses are:

- Civil liberties of South African Jews
- Relationship between South African Jews and wider society
- Antisemitism and discrimination

== Criticism ==
Although the Board condemned Apartheid in 1985, its earlier neutral stance drew scrutiny during the Israel-Gaza War from commentators such as former African National Congress MP Andrew Feinstein. A minor activist group, South African Jews for a Free Palestine (SAJFP), has criticised the SAJBD's support for Israel during the war, issuing statements opposing its position.

== Notable figures ==
- Dennis Davis
- Israel A. Maisels
- Michael Bagraim
