= Arthur Saul Super =

British-Israeli rabbi and journalist

Rabbi Arthur Saul Super

Personal life
- Born: Avraham Shaul Super; 1 July 1908 Great Yarmouth, England
- Died: 28 July 1979 (aged 71) Netanya, Israel
- Buried: Herzliya, Israel
- Spouse: Sally Berko (divorced); Tilla Hyams
- Children: 2
- Parents: Isaac Jacob Super (father); Leah Super (née Bull) (mother)
- Education: Jews' College; School of Oriental and African Studies; University of Cambridge

Religious life
- Religion: Judaism
- Denomination: Orthodox Judaism; Reform Judaism

Jewish leader
- Position: Chief Minister
- Organisation: United Jewish Progressive Congregations of Johannesburg
- Began: 1964
- Ended: 1975
- Semikhah: Jews' College

Arthur Saul Super (Hebrew: ארתור סול סופר; 1 July 1908 - 28 July 1979) was a British-born rabbi and journalist. He initially served as a rabbi to Orthodox congregations before switching allegiances to Reform Judaism. He served as Chief Minister of the United Jewish Progressive Congregations of Johannesburg between 1964 and 1975.

== Early life ==
He was born in Great Yarmouth, England to parents, Isaac Jacob Super and Leah Super (née Bull). His father and grandfathers on both sides were Orthodox rabbis. His paternal grandfather, Reb Mordekhai Zev (Marks) Bull, was one of the first Chabad Chassidim in England. In 1914 he moved with his family to Melbourne, where his Latvian-born father was appointed Chief Shokhet for the Melbourne United Shechitah Board. When he was 18 he was the recipient of the Max Michaelis scholarship to study in England. He graduated with degrees from the University of Cambridge and School of Oriental and African Studies. He received his Semikhah (rabbinical ordination) from Jews' College.

== Career ==
In 1933 he translated the "Children's Haggadah" with Isidore Wartski. He then relocated to Montreal, Canada after his ordination and was a rabbi at Congregation Shaar Hashomayim between 1933 and 1936. He also edited Autoemancipation, a meditation on Zionism by Leon Pinsker. He returned to England to serve the United Hebrew Congregation of Leeds between 1937 and 1940. He served as an army chaplain during World War II and was present at the liberation of Bergen-Belsen concentration camp After the war he took on a new post as rabbi of Bayswater & Maida Vale Synagogue, a United Synagogue congregation in West London from 1947 to 1950. He then left Orthodox Judaism behind and moved to Israel, where he was the chief editorial writer and assistant editor of The Jerusalem Post. In 1955 he translated Sholem Asch's novel, The Prophet from Yiddish to English The following year the Jerusalem Post Press published his book, Alonei Yitzhak, a Youth Village in Israel. In Israel he also became involved in congregations affiliated with Reform Judaism.

He emigrated to South Africa in 1960 where he continued as a journalist, as an editor for The Zionist Record. He then returned to his rabbinical career after his ordination as a Reform rabbi. He was appointed rabbi of Beit Emanuel in 1964 before succeeding rabbi Moses Cyrus Weiler as Chief Minister of the United Jewish Progressive Congregations of Johannesburg after Weiler made aliyah to Israel. He was then based at the Union's headquarters at Temple Israel in Hillbrow. At the time there was a cultural split between reform Jewry in Johannesburg and its counterpart in Cape Town, with the leadership in Cape Town rejecting a proposal for the creation of the position of Chief Minister under which all Progressive congregations would fall. The appointee would have been Weiler, who was based in Johannesburg at Temple Israel in Hillbrow. Cape Town wanted a looser federation where each city made its own decisions and pushed back against the notion of a Chief Minister, arguing that it was against the democratic principles of Reform Judaism. In 1951, Cape Town quit the South African Union for Progressive Judaism and the position of Chief Minister came to instead represent Johannesburg's Reform Jewry. Cape Town refused to return to the union until 1963.

One of Super's significant achievements was the 1965 concordat he arrived at with Orthodox Chief Rabbi of South Africa, Rabbi Bernard M. Casper. They agreed that from "the religious point of view there is an unbridgeable gulf between Orthodoxy and Reform." Super said that this was the conclusion he arrived at “after a thorough examination of the Halachic situation and the Halachic principles involved.” The agreement was welcomed by the Jewish establishment in the country, with the South African Jewish Board of Deputies describing it as “a very sensible and practical agreement.” However, within progressive Jewish circles it was regarded as a capitulation to Orthodoxy. Super was only representing Johannesburg's progressive congregations in the agreement. His counterpart in Cape Town, Rabbi David Sherman was opposed to the position taken by Super, stating that it amounted to “allowing ourselves to be read out of the community of Klal Yisrael." In 1968, the Women's Zionist Council of SA (WIZO) published his booklet “Five Generations of Jewish Life - a Review of Jewish History since the Nineteenth Century”, made up of twelve lectures by Super.

Super retired in 1975 and made aliyah to Israel soon afterwards. In 1977 he was quoted by Chaim Herzog, future President of Israel in his concluding words to the Central Conference of American Rabbis in June of that year: It is not I who says this. This thesis was propounded by a well known colleague of yours Arthur Saul Super of Johannesburg. In an article only last week on this subject in the Jerusalem Post he stated: "But the real fault lies with the proponents of Reform Judaism themselves. They have woefully failed to impress on Israelis the vitality of Reform as a spiritual force in the life of an old-new nation struggling to come to terms with itself and with the outside world." He died in 1979 in Netanya and was buried in Herzliya.

== Personal life ==
Super married Sally Berko, with whom he had a son, Bernard Samuel Super (1935 - 2016) in Montreal, Canada. The couple subsequently divorced and Super married the widow, Tilly Hyams. He legally adopted Hyams' daughter, Stacia (1946 - 2015) in 1957, her biological father had died in 1947. Stacia had the first Bat Mitzvah in Israel in 1959.
