= David Sherman (rabbi) =

South African and American rabbi (1909–2002)

Rabbi David Sherman

Personal life
- Born: David Shereshevsky; 13 September 1909 Boston, Massachusetts, United States
- Died: 12 May 2002 (aged 92) Cape Town, South Africa
- Education: Boston University; Hebrew Union College – Jewish Institute of Religion

Religious life
- Religion: Judaism
- Denomination: Reform Judaism

Jewish leader
- Position: Rabbi
- Synagogue: Temple Israel, Cape Town

Rabbi Dr David Sherman (13 September 1909 – 12 May 2002) was a South African and American rabbi. He was the first spiritual leader of a Reform congregation in Cape Town, where he led Temple Israel in Green Point.

== Early life and career ==
He was born in Boston, Massachusetts to parents, Abraham Moshe Shereshevsky (1857–1927) and Shifra Shereshevsky (née Libovsky). His father was an Orthodox rabbi. He graduated from Boston University and later studied at Hebrew Union College – Jewish Institute of Religion in Cincinnati, a Jewish seminary where he was ordained as a Reform rabbi. At Hebrew Union, he befriended Moses Cyrus Weiler, future founder of the Reform movement in South Africa. Both were leaders of the 'Hebrew-speakers Club' at the college. His first rabbinical post was in Cleveland, Ohio as assistant to Rabbi Abba Hillel Silver, a key figure in the mobilization of American support for the founding of the State of Israel. Chaim Weizmann, future President of Israel, was impressed by Sherman and hired him as Director of Community relations for an American Jewish Conference, which aimed to promote greater Jewish unity and organizational effectiveness for the expanding and pluralistic American Jewish community. He later took on a rabbinical position at the Jewish Community Center in Binghampton.

In 1943 he emigrated to South Africa where he was the first Reform rabbi in Cape Town at his congregation, Temple Israel in Green Point. Weiler had been tasked with establishing a national Reform movement and in 1943, he agreed to help set up the first progressive congregation in Cape Town and was able to call upon Sherman, his friend and Hebrew Union classmate. The Reform movement in the city quickly grew under Sherman's leadership, eventually representing just under 25% of Cape Town Jewry. In 1947 he married Bertha Cohen at Temple Israel and the wedding was officiated by Weiler.

In the 1940s and 1950s there was a cultural split between reform Jewry in Johannesburg and its counterpart in Cape Town, with the leadership in Green Point rejecting a proposal for the creation of the position of Chief Minister under which all Progressive congregations would fall. The appointee would have been Weiler, who was based in Johannesburg at Temple Israel in Hillbrow. Cape Town wanted a looser federation where each city made its own decisions and pushed back against the notion of a Chief Minister, arguing that it was against the democratic principles of Reform Judaism. In 1951, Cape Town quit the South African Union for Progressive Judaism and refused to return until 1963.

In 1965, Sherman was critical of a concordat that was signed in Johannesburg between the Orthodox Chief Rabbi, Bernard M. Casper and Chief Minister of the United Progressive Jewish Congregations Rabbi Arthur Saul Super. They agreed that from "the religious point of view there is an unbridgeable gulf between Orthodoxy and Reform." Super was only representing Johannesburg's progressive congregations in the agreement. Rabbi Sherman argued that it amounted to "allowing ourselves to be read out of the community of Klal Yisrael." His congregation and the Reform movement had faced opposition from Rabbi Israel Abrahams of Gardens Shul. He arranged a series of meetings on the perils of the Reform tradition, and upon his appointment as Chief Rabbi in the Cape in 1951, attempted to prohibit his rabbis, cantors and Hebrew teachers from meeting with rabbis and other representatives of the Reform movement He also attempted to prevent the movement from hiring communal halls. Rabbi Rabinowitz, who led the Marais Road Shul was sympathetic to Abrahams. Rabbi Sherman was addressing a 1963 function held by the Union of Jewish Women, Rabbi Rabinowitz and his wife refused to attend. He wrote to his congregants telling them that the UJW, as a social and charitable organisation, had no right to invite a Reform minister (Sherman) to address them. “I am not going to tell my lady members that they must not go… but I really don’t think you should go” and admitted that some women who had not intended to go were now going “out of perversity”. According to Sherman “Orthodox women were instructed not to attend the trefe lecture in the trefe hall. The result was an exceptionally large attendance.”

Sherman took a discreet yet courageous stand on issues of human rights, he opposed apartheid and spoke at protest meetings. During his tenure, Major Hall at Temple Israel had a dual function as a centre for African culture, literacy and poverty alleviation projects. In May 1995, a gala dinner was organised in Sherman's honour, marking 48 years of service to the Jewish community. Weiler, who had made aliyah in 1958, also attended the dinner. Sherman died at age 92 in Cape Town in 2002.
