= Temple Israel (Cape Town) =

Progressive Judaism organization in Cape Town, South Africa

- Logo of the congregation

Religion
- Affiliation: Reform Judaism
- Ecclesiastical or organizational status: Synagogue and congregation
- Ownership: Cape Town Progressive Jewish Congregation
- Leadership: Rabbi Greg Alexander; Rabbi Malcolm Matitiani
- Year consecrated: 1944
- Status: Active

Location
- Location: Green Point; Wynberg; Milnerton; all in Cape Town, Western Cape
- Country: South Africa

Architecture
- Type: Synagogue architecture
- Established: 1944 (as a congregation)

Website
- templeisrael.co.za

The Temple Israel, also known as the Cape Town Progressive Jewish Congregation (CTPJC), is a Progressive Jewish congregation, located in Cape Town, with three synagogues located in each of Green Point, Wynberg and Milnerton, in the Western Cape region of South Africa. As three centres combined, they are the largest Progressive congregation in South Africa, and the second largest Jewish congregation in Cape Town after Marais Road Shul in Sea Point.

The congregation started in Green Point in 1944, eight years after South Africa's first progressive synagogue opened in Hillbrow in Johannesburg. The Cape Town congregation caters to over 3,000 Progressive Jews in the city. The congregation is an affiliate of the South African Union for Progressive Judaism, which is part of the World Union for Progressive Judaism (WUPJ). The congregation represents around 18% of Jews living in Cape Town.

== History ==
The congregation was founded in Green Point in 1944 by founding rabbinic couple, Rabbi Dr David Sherman (z”l) and Bertha Sherman (z”l). Rabbi Moses Cyrus Weiler (z”l) founded the Reform movement and led the movement's mother synagogue, also called Temple Israel, in Hillbrow. Although Weiler had been tasked with establishing a national Reform movement, he resisted establishing other congregations outside Hillbrow during his first ten years. He felt that it was more important to build a significant membership in Johannesburg before expanding nationwide. In 1943, he relented and agreed to help set up the first progressive congregation in Cape Town, and was able to call upon Sherman, his friend and Hebrew Union classmate. Sherman led Temple Israel in Green Point for the ensuing decades, seeing exponential growth with 25% of Cape Town Jewry affiliating themselves with the Reform movement. In comparison, the percentage of Johannesburg Jews affiliated to the Reform branch has always been under 10%. The profile of the local Atlantic Seaboard Jewry differed from the Yiddish-speaking Jewish migrants that settled in District Six and Woodstock, Cape Town generations before. They were usually South African-born and spoke English in the family home. They mostly attended local government schools rather than Jewish schools (cheders or yeshivot). They were usually more affluent than their migrant parents and they abandoned many religious practices, favouring modern dress and haircuts and sometimes anglicizing their names.

In Johannesburg, Weiler had faced backlash for introducing Confirmation at age 16, requiring students to study for an exam and then lead a service. Parents also voiced their disagreement with the Christian-sounding name for the rite. However, Confirmation, which had become common in American Reform Judaism, persisted in Cape Town under Rabbi Sherman's leadership. By 1977, the Green Point congregation had been holding Confirmation services for 31 years.

In the 1940s and 1950s there was a Johannesburg-Cape Town cultural split when Temple Israel in Green Point rejected a proposal for the creation of the position of Chief Minister under which all Progressive congregations would fall. The appointee would have been Rabbi Weiler, who was based in Johannesburg. Weiler had sent Victor Brasch as his emissary to Cape Town to assure the community of the need for central control, based in Johannesburg, and ensuring that each congregation follow the same formula. However, Cape Town wanted a looser federation where each city made its own decisions and pushed back against the notion of a Chief Minister, arguing that it was against the democratic principles of Reform Judaism. In 1951, Cape Town quit the South African Union for Progressive Judaism and refused to return until 1963.

The arrival of the congregation and Reform Judaism in Cape Town was met with opposition from Rabbi Israel Abrahams, spiritual leader of the Gardens Shul. He arranged a series of meetings on the perils of the Reform tradition, and upon his appointment as Chief Rabbi in the Cape in 1951, attempted to prohibit his rabbis, cantors and Hebrew teachers from meeting with rabbis and other representatives of the Reform movement. He also attempted to prevent the movement from hiring communal halls. Dr Herman Kramer, a long-time president of the Orthodox Marais Road Shul in Sea Point, later became president of Temple Israel. In 1965, Rabbi Sherman was critical of a concordat that was signed in Johannesburg between the Orthodox Chief Rabbi, Bernard M. Casper and Chief Minister of the United Progressive Jewish Congregations Rabbi Arthur Saul Super. They agreed that from "the religious point of view there is an unbridgeable gulf between Orthodoxy and Reform." Super was only representing Johannesburg's progressive congregations in the agreement. Rabbi Sherman argued that it amounted to “allowing ourselves to be read out of the community of Klal Yisrael."

Rabbi Rabinowitz, who led the Orthodox Marais Road Shul in Sea Point from 1959, was sympathetic to Abrahams' viewpoint. Rabbi Sherman was addressing a 1963 function held by the Union of Jewish Women, Rabbi Rabinowitz and his wife refused to attend. He wrote to his congregants telling them that the UJW, as a social and charitable organisation, had no right to invite a Reform minister (Sherman) to address them. “I am not going to tell my lady members that they must not go… but I really don’t think you should go” and admitted that some women who had not intended to go were now going “out of perversity”. According to Sherman “Orthodox women were instructed not to attend the trefe lecture in the trefe hall. The result was an exceptionally large attendance.”. The congregation had more cordial relations with Rabbi David Rosen, who led the Marais Road congregation between 1975 and 1980. Rabbi Rosen conducted a Bat Mitzvah service with the participation of the Temple Israel choir and the two synagogues worked together to set up a facility in the area to provide cheap meals for vagrants. In 1982, the Marais Road Shul president accepted an invitation to attend the induction service of a Reform rabbi at Temple Israel, with the Cape Beth Din determining that there was neither reason nor halachic grounds to refuse to attend or for an Orthodox rabbi not to attend a chuppah under which a Reform rabbi participated.

Sherman took a discreet yet courageous stand on issues of human rights, he opposed apartheid and spoke at protest meetings. During his tenure, Major Hall at Temple Israel had a dual function as a centre for African culture, literacy and poverty alleviation projects. In 1971, to mark Sherman's 25th anniversary with the congregation, the David Sherman Lecture was established. Each year, a prestigious speaker would be invited to give the lecture. The congregation has invited figures such as the Israeli politician Aryeh Eliav and Robert Kaplan, Chair of the United Jewish Appeal (UIA) South Africa. The congregation has also been addressed by Nobel Prize winners, F. W. de Klerk, State President of South Africa and Desmond Tutu, the Anglican bishop. On other occasions, figures such as Dr. Alon Liel, Israel's ambassador to South Africa addressed the congregation and Tony Leon, leader of the opposition have addressed the congregation.

In 1965, a second temple was opened in Wynberg to serve congregants in the Southern Suburbs. The most recent congregation was formed in 1998 in Milnerton. The original Temple Israel in Green point was a much larger building that was later demolished. Part of the land was developed for apartments and a smaller synagogue was rebuilt to better meet the needs of the community. Between 1994 and 1997, Dana Evan Kaplan, an American rabbi, led the congregation.

In 2020, a study by the Institute for Jewish Policy Research and the Kaplan Centre at the University of Cape Town found that 18% of Jewish respondents in Cape Town identify as progressive.

During the COVID-19 pandemic, the congregation live-streamed services, an option that was unavailable to Orthodox congregations. Online attendance for services such as Yom Kippur was especially high and much greater than Temple Israel's combined membership.

Temple Israel in Green Point also houses, Czech Memorial Scroll 128, a Sefer Torah. As the Nazis invaded Czechoslovakia, some of the artefacts such as the Torah scrolls were rescued and stored in a warehouse in Prague. Donors from Westminster Synagogue bought 1 564 scrolls from the Czechoslovak government in 1964. The scrolls were restored and many have been sent to congregations around the world, including Temple Israel.

== Clergy ==
=== Historical ===
- Rabbi David Sherman (1909–2002), congregational rabbi from 1944 to 1989, then Rabbi Emeritus from 1989 to 2002
- Reverend Isaac Richards, congregational service leader from 1946/47 to 1970.
- Rabbi Sonny Myer Benjamin (1919-1995), congregational Rabbi From 1976-1988.
- Rabbi Robert Leib, assistant Rabbi in 1989
- Rabbi David Hoffman (1954–2011), congregational rabbi from 1989 to 2006
- Rabbi Dana Evan Kaplan, congregational rabbi from 1994 to 1997
- Rabbi Emma Gottlieb, Toronto-born congregational Rabbi from 2018-2023 and graduate of the Hebrew Union College-Jewish Institute of Religion.

=== Current ===
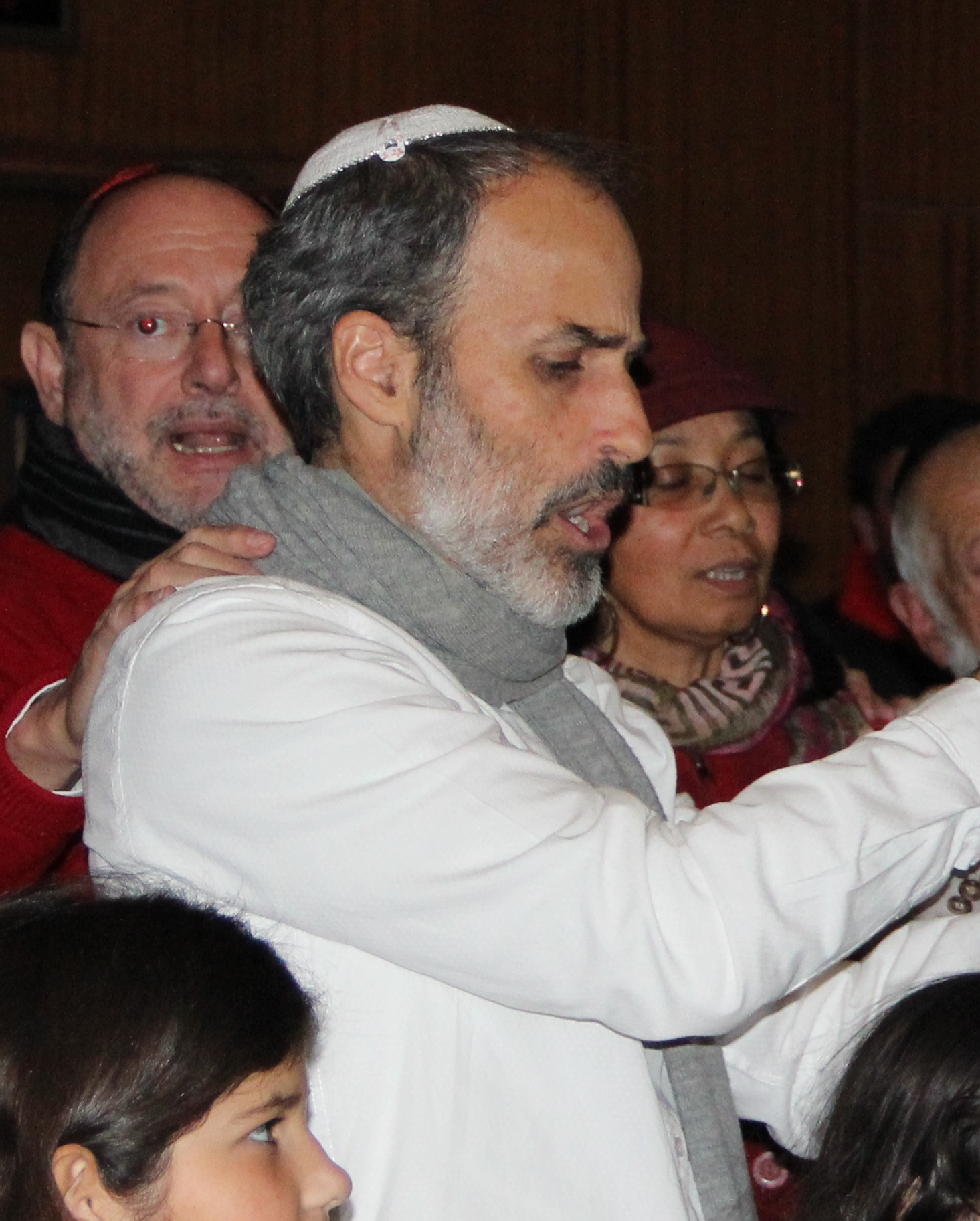
Rabbi Greg Alexander

The congregation is served by four rabbis;

- Rabbi Greg Alexander was raised in Temple Shalom in Johannesburg, and is a graduate of the University of Cape Town and Netzer Olami. He completed his rabbinical training at the Leo Baeck College in London.
- Rabbi Malcolm Matitiani was raised in the Progressive movement in Pretoria. He became one of the first three rabbis to be ordained in Germany (at the Abraham-Geiger-Kolleg) since the Shoah. He also has a master's degree in Rabbinic Literature from the University of Cape Town. Congregational rabbi since 2006.
- Rabbi Richard Newman was raised in the Progressive movement in Cape Town. He lived in Israel for more than 16 years and completed his rabbinical training at Abraham-Geiger-Kolleg in Germany. He holds degrees from Leeds University and UNISA and has also lectured in Yiddish and Hebrew at the University of Denver. Congregational rabbi since 2010.

== Notable members ==
- Raymond Ackerman (1931–2023), businessman and retailer

== See also ==
- History of the Jews in South Africa
- List of synagogues in South Africa
