= South African Union for Progressive Judaism =

Affiliate of the World Union for Progressive Judaism

South African Union for Progressive Judaism (SAUPJ)
- Theology: Progressive Judaism
- National Chair: Monica Solomon
- Associations: World Union for Progressive Judaism
- Region: South Africa
- Headquarters: 38 Oxford Road, Parktown, Johannesburg (Beit Emanuel)
- Congregations: 11
- Official website: saupj.org.za

The South African Union for Progressive Judaism (SAUPJ) is an affiliate of the World Union for Progressive Judaism and supports 11 progressive congregations. Rabbi Moses Cyrus Weiler, a founder of Reform Judaism in the country, led the country's first Reform synagogue, Temple Israel in Hillbrow, Johannesburg. Weiler is credited with growing the movement, to represent 15-17% of South African Jewry and establishing 25 congregations in the country (Shain 2011). A 2020 joint study by the Institute for Jewish Policy Research and the University of Cape Town showed that 12% of Jews identified as Progressive and that in relative terms the progressive strands are increasing after falling to 7% in 1998 and 2005 studies. In Johannesburg, the community accounts for 7% of the city's Jewry, rising to 18% in Cape Town and 25% in Durban.

== History ==
The movement was inspired when ethnologist Abraham Zevi Idelsohn visited his family in Johannesburg in September 1929 for his parents’ Golden Wedding anniversary. At the time Idelson was a professor at Hebrew Union College-Jewish Institute of Religion where he gave talks on the nature and principles of Reform Judaism. He urged his brother, Jerry to establish a group for progressive Judaism in Johannesburg. Jerry undertook this task and then joined his brother in Europe where they met several prominent leaders of the Progressive movement such as Lily Montagu. Montagu later sent Liberal Sabbath prayers books to use for services in South Africa.

Jerry then formed a committee in South Africa with Louis Caplan, Dr Louis Freed and Simund Haas. The earlier religious services took place in private homes in 1930. Jerry then popularized the movement by giving public lectures, writing about Progressive Judaism and speaking to the press. In June 1931 the South African Jewish Religious Union for Liberal Judaism was established with Jerry serving as honorary secretary. Then with the aid of Montagu and his brother, Jerry negotiated with Moses Cyrus Weiler, a student at Hebrew Union College-Jewish Institute of Religion to join the burgeoning movement in South Africa. Weiler arrived in Johannesburg in 1933 after being ordained as a rabbi. A Progressive congregation was then formed with the first service taking place at the Freemasons' Hall. At the end of 1933 the Progressive movement purchased a site in Hillbrow, downtown Johannesburg to build a synagogue. The synagogue, Temple Israel was officially opened in 1936 with Weiler serving as rabbi.Although Weiler had been tasked with establishing a national Reform movement, he resisted establishing other congregations outside Hillbrow during his first ten years. He felt that it was more important to build a significant membership at Temple Israel before expanding nationwide. In 1943, he agreed to help set up the first progressive congregation in Cape Town, where he was surprised at its success with just under 25% of Cape Town Jewry affiliating themselves with Reform Judaism. In comparison, the percentage of Johannesburg Jews affiliated to the Reform branch has always been under 10%.

In the 1940s and 1950s there was a Johannesburg-Cape Town cultural split when progressive Jewish leadership in Cape Town rejected a proposal for the creation of the position of Chief Minister under which all Progressive congregations would fall. The appointee would have been Rabbi Weiler, who was based in Johannesburg. Weiler had sent Victor Brasch as his emissary to Cape Town to assure the community of the need for central control, based in Johannesburg, and ensuring that each congregation follow the same formula. However, Cape Town wanted a looser federation where each city made its own decision and pushed back against the notion of a Chief Minister, arguing that it was against the democratic principles of Reform Judaism. In 1951, Cape Town quit the South African Union for Progressive Judaism and refused to return until 1963.

In 1950, The New York Times reported on Weiler's trip to New York where he was speaking at Temple Israel of the City of New York: "It is important that Reform Jewry in the United States take more interest in the welfare of progressive Judaism abroad and embark upon a Reform Jewish Marshall Plan. It should assist the progressive Jewish communities abroad morally and financially" Weiler made aliyah to Israel in 1958, his departure came as a surprise, although he was deeply upset by the schism with Cape Town. He is credited with having grown the movement considerably, with 25 congregations established during his tenure. There were at one point progressive congregations in smaller urban centres of the country, including Bloemfontein, Springs, Klerksdorp and Germiston.

As in other diaspora communities there have been tensions between the Progressive and Orthodox movements of the country. Rabbi Israel Abrahams, spiritual leader of the Orthodox Gardens Shul in Cape Town, was opposed to the arrival of Reform Judaism in Cape Town, with Temple Israel having opened in 1944. He arranged a series of meetings on the perils of the Reform tradition, and upon his appointment as Chief Rabbi in the Cape in 1951, attempted to prohibit his rabbis, cantors and Hebrew teachers from meeting with rabbis and other representatives of the Reform movement. He also attempted to prevent the movement from hiring communal halls. Rabbi Phillip Rosenberg, the first spiritual leader of the Orthodox Marais Road Shul in Sea Point, distanced himself from Orthodoxy in a letter to Lily Montagu and welcomed the arrival of a Reform congregation in the Cape. Rosenberg later served both Orthodox and Reform congregations in South Africa. Dr Herman Kramer, a long-time Marais Road president, later became president of Cape Town's first Reform congregation, Temple Israel. In 1962, Marais Road allowed the Board of Deputies to host a lecture by visiting Rabbi Solomon Freehof, president of the Central Conference of American Rabbis and the World Union for Progressive Judaism at their large Jewish communal hall, Weizmann Hall. In 1965 a concordat was signed in Johannesburg between the Orthodox Chief Rabbi, Bernard M. Casper and Chief Minister of the United Progressive Jewish Congregations Rabbi Arthur Saul Super. They agreed that from "the religious point of view there is an unbridgeable gulf between Orthodoxy and Reform." (Hellig 1987)Super said that this was the conclusion he arrived at “after a thorough examination of the Halachic situation and the Halachic principles involved.” The agreement was welcomed by the Jewish establishment in the country, with the South African Jewish Board of Deputies describing it as “a very sensible and practical agreement.” However, within progressive Jewish circles it was regarded as a capitulation to Orthodoxy. Super was only representing Johannesburg's progressive congregations in the agreement. His counterpart in Cape Town, Rabbi David Sherman was opposed to the position taken by Super, stating that it amounted to “allowing ourselves to be read out of the community of Klal Yisrael."

Progressive Judaism peaked in the 1970s in terms of numbers, resources and self confidence. It accounted for around 15% of the Jewish population. Subsequent years became more challenging as the Soweto uprising prompted white emigration and sanctions impacted on overseas funding. The movement also faced competition as an Orthodox Jewish revival began to take hold in Johannesburg in the 1970s. Progressive leaders have argued that the non-observant Orthodox population observe less than their Progressive counterparts and that they would be more comfortable in the Progressive movement (Hellig 1987). A contentious issue between both movements has been over burial rights in Jewish cemeteries. Over time, accommodations and compromises has been reached. In the case of Durban and East London, the progressive communities formed their own Chevra Kadisha. In other cases, a separate section of an existing Jewish cemetery was set aside where burials could take place under a Progressive auspices.

On 6 August 1983 a limpet mine exploded outside Temple Israel, four hours before State President Marais Viljoen was scheduled to attend a ceremony marking the congregation's 50th anniversary. There were no injuries and the celebration went ahead with Viljoen in attendance. Mahommed Iqbal Shaik of the Dolphin Unit of Umkhonto we Sizwe (MK) later assumed responsibility during the Truth and Reconciliation Commission hearings and he was granted amnesty.

The SAUPJ took the strongest stand of any of the Jewish movements in the country against apartheid. It opposed disinvestment while women in the movement engaged in social work as a form of protest. This includes the Moses Weiler School in Alexandra where for generations the school has been funded and led by women from the Progressive movement, even in opposition to the Bantu Education Act, 1953 (Feld 2014). The Mitzvah School on the site of Beit David in Sandton during the late 1980s was another example of successful outreach. Progressive rabbis were also more likely than their Orthodox counterparts to publicly oppose the apartheid policies of the National Party government. Although their respective congregations were usually more cautious than their leaders. In 1986, the Beit Emanuel rabbi, Norman Mendel reiterated this, telling an audience that Progressive Jewry in the country were leading the Jewish struggle against the “indefensible, immoral and evil” policies of apartheid. He said that Progressive Jews are opposing apartheid “against a backdrop of Jewish discrimination” from the Orthodox community. “There is day to day diminishment in the Reform movement in South Africa. Reform are considered a second class Jewish community,” he added.

In 1993 there were divisions when Mendel's successor at Beit Emanuel, Rabbi Ady Asabi declared both the Beit Emanuel and Imanu-Shalom congregations as independent and Masorti synagogues, breaking with the SAUPJ and Progressive Judaism. A court case ensued to retain both of the congregations under the SAUPJ. Beit Emanuel returned to the SAUPJ following an agreement and Shalom became independent and Masorti (Dubb and Shain 1995).

In the 1990s and 2000s, the movement appeared to be facing an impending crisis. In two surveys undertaken by the Kaplan Centre for Jewish Studies at the University of Cape Town, only 7% of respondents identified as progressive. However, recent years have seen a revival with 12% of South African Jewry identifying as progressive in a 2020 study by the Kaplan Centre and the Institute for Jewish Policy Research . The study showed that there was higher progressive representation in coastal cities such as Cape Town (18%) and Durban (25%) as opposed to Johannesburg (7%). The reversal in fortunes has been attributed to the efforts of a younger generation of progressive rabbis bringing renewed energy to their congregations. The community has also seen growth through Conversion to Judaism as 500 progressive conversions took place between 2002-2018.

== Beliefs ==
The denomination shares the basic tenets of Reform Judaism (alternatively known also as Progressive or Liberal) worldwide: a theistic, personal God; an ongoing revelation, under the influence of which all scripture was written – but not dictated by providence – that enables contemporary Jews to reach new religious insights without necessarily being committed to the conventions of the past; regarding the ethical and moral values of Judaism as its true essence, while ritual and practical observance are means to achieve spiritual elation and not an end to themselves – and therefore, rejecting the binding nature of Jewish law; a belief in the coming of a Messianic era rather than a personal Messiah, and in immortality of the soul only, instead of bodily resurrection. Prayers referring to such concepts were omitted from the liturgy, and traditional practices abolished or altered considerably.

Jocelyn Hellig, professor of religious studies and one of the best-known interpreters of South African Judaism, wrote about the community in a seminal paper on Jewish practice published in 1987. Hellig described the Progressive community as conservative in religious practice. This was also given as an explanation for the relatively modest presence of Masorti Judaism in the country (Hellig 1987; Shain 2011). The paper also observed that for practical purposes, progressive Jews prefer to go through Orthodox channels to seek and attain divorce (Hellig 1987). Rabbi Moses Cyrus Weiler, the founding rabbi of Reform Judaism in the country, fostered what has been referred to as ‘Weilerism’, a specific form of Reform Judaism specific to a South African context. This was “rather more cautious than the principles of his American and British counterparts” however, still quite radical by South African standards.Weiler was keen to replicate a trend in American Reform Judaism, where Bar Mitzvah at age 13 was replaced with Confirmation at age 16, requiring students to study for an exam and then lead a service. However, in South Africa there was instant backlash to the Christian-sounding name of Confirmation and because of the ingrained rite of passage that a Bar Mitzvah held for Jewish boys. Weiler quickly reintroduced Bar Mitzah and any dedicated students that were committed to Conformation did so under the guise of Hebrew names such as Bnei Emunah.

The innovations in the services included the use of English alongside Hebrew, gender equality on synagogue committees and the eventual introduction of Bat Mitzvah ceremonies. The Hazzan was also replaced by professional mixed choirs. Weiler also made it compulsory for men to wear a kippah and tallit in services, likewise he expected women to cover their heads too. Kosher dietary laws (Kashrut) were not mandatory but were encouraged. Weiler also introduced a strong emphasis on Zionism, Temple Israel started the first local services where the Hebrew had Israeli-style Sephardic pronunciation rather than Ashkenazic. Hatikvah, the national anthem of the State of Israel was also sung alongside God Save the King. The community has traditionally been pro-Zionist and inspired by Weiler, who made Aliyah (Hellig 1987).

=== Marriage ===
A 2007 resolution allows synagogues to decide about same-sex marriage.

== Organisational structure ==
Progressive Judaism has always been relatively smaller in South Africa compared to its American counterpart. South Africa did not experience a significant wave of Jewish migration from Germany, where Reform Judaism and the Haskalah originate (Hellig 1987). It is true that Anglo-German Jewry established the South African Jewish community and later around 6, 500 German Jewish refugees came to South Africa between 1933 and 1942 (Hellig 2009). However, Gustav Saron argues that as the dominant immigrant group, Lithuanian Jews have shaped the essential character of the community (Shain 2011). South African synagogue affiliation has also tended to be more focused on family association rather than on ideological choices (Hellig 1987). Community growth may have also been stymied by the significance of the non-observant Orthodox, the dominant mode of Jewish religious identification in the country (Hellig 1987; Stier 2004). Therefore, South African Jewish society remains mostly nominally Orthodox.

The Progressive movement in South Africa and the overall South African Jewish population reached its high point in the 1970s with an estimated Jewish population of 120 000 of whom 11 000 identified with the Progressive movement. Today the Jewish population is estimated at between 60 - 70 000 with around 6 000 Progressive Jews. In 2019 the SAUPJ estimates that around 10% of the resident Jewish population identify as Progressive. This may mark a slight proportional increase from a 1998 survey that put the percentage of Progressive Jews at 7% (Shain 2011). However, others estimate that the progressive share of the resident Jewish population was once as high as 20%. Dana Evan Kaplan and Jocelyn Hellig agree upon this figure (Kaplan 2000; Hellig 1987). Milton Shain, one of the most prominent readers of the South African Jewish experience has a more conservative estimate, arguing that during its zenith, Progressive Judaism accounted for a 17% share (Shain 2011).

Kaplan said that challenges for the community have been both emigration and the absence of Progressive Jewish day schools. Kaplan pointed to Australia, which has a similar composition of Jewish society and where the development of such schools has stabilized the progressive community's numbers (Kaplan 2000). However, there are "middle of the road" schools aligned to Orthodoxy such as Yeshiva College of South Africa, King David Schools, Johannesburg and United Herzlia Schools that serve Jewish children of varying practice and commitment (Hellig 1987). Progressive South African Jews are also making use of these day schools overseas. South African children along with their Israeli counterparts form the main immigrant groups of children attending the Akiva School, a Reform-based primary at the Sternberg Centre in London. A 2010 study was commissioned by the Kaplan Centre for Jewish Studies at the University of Cape Town to look at the composition of South African Jewish communities residing in London. In a sample of 314 participants, 16.2% identified as Progressive and 7.3% identified with the other progressive stream of Masorti.

There are 11 progressive congregations, mostly concentrated in South Africa's metropolitan areas; Johannesburg (4), Cape Town (3), Durban (1), Pretoria (1), East London and Port Elizabeth. The most recent congregation is Beit Luria established in 2019 in the Randburg area of Johannesburg. The largest congregation is in Cape Town as the Cape Town Progressive Jewish Congregation (CTPJC) brings together three congregations with a membership of 3, 000. This also makes it the second largest Jewish congregation in the city.

Non-Orthodox conversions to Judaism also take place under the auspices of the SAUPJ. Rabbi Sa'ar Shaked of Beit Emanuel Progressive Synagogue is currently involved in efforts to establish a Rabbinic Academy and Higher Education Institution in Gauteng.

== Bibliography ==
- Dubb, Allie A. & Shain, Milton (1995). "South Africa". In Adler, Cyrus (ed.). American Jewish Year Book, Volume 95. The American Jewish Committee. pp. 360–369. ISBN 0-87495-108-9.
- Feld, Marjorie N. (2013). Nations Divided: American Jews and the Struggle over Apartheid. Palgrave Macmillan. p. 191. ISBN 978-1-137-02972-0.
- Hellig, Jocelyn (July 1987). "The Religious Expression of South African Jewry". Religion in Southern Africa. 8 (2): 3–17.
- Hellig, Jocelyn (2009). "German Jewish Immigration to South Africa during the 1930s: Revisiting the Charter of the SS Stuttgart". Jewish Culture and History. 11 (1 & 2): 134–138. doi:10.1080/1462169X.2009.10512119. S2CID 159925386.
- Kaplan, Dana Evan (2000). "Chapter 17: Reform Judaism". In Neusner, Jacob (ed.). The Blackwell Companion to Judaism. Blackwell. pp. 291–311. ISBN 9781577180586.
- Shain, Milton (February 2011). "Jewish cultures, identities and contingencies: reflections from the South African experience". European Review of History. 18 (1): 89–100. doi:10.1080/13507486.2011.543584. S2CID 159671669.
- Stier, Oren Baruch (Spring–Summer 2004). "South Africa's Jewish Complex". Jewish Social Studies. 10 (3): 123–142. doi:10.2979/JSS.2004.10.3.123.
