= WUPJ =

WUPJ may refer to:

- WUPJ (FM), a radio station (90.9 FM) licensed to serve Escanaba, Michigan, United States
- World Union for Progressive Judaism
