= David Rosen (rabbi) =

English-Israeli rabbi (born 1951)

Rabbi David Rosen KSG CBE
- דוד רוזן
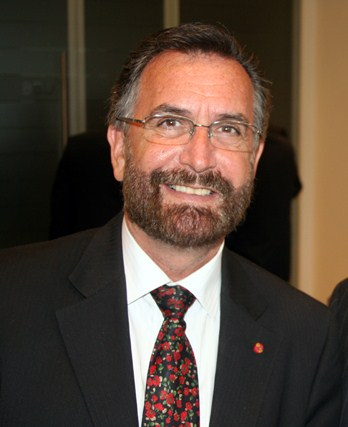

Personal life
- Born: David Shlomo Rosen; 1951 (age 74–75) Newbury, Berkshire, England
- Spouse: Sharon Rothstein (m. 1973)
- Children: 3
- Parent: Kopul Rosen (father)
- Education: Yeshivat Har Etzion

Religious life
- Religion: Judaism

Jewish leader
- Predecessor: Isaac Cohen
- Successor: Ephraim Mirvis
- Position: Chief Rabbi
- Synagogue: Ireland
- Began: 1979
- Ended: 1985
- Residence: Jerusalem

David Shlomo Rosen (Hebrew: דוד רוזן; born 1951) is a British-Israeli rabbi and interfaith peacemaker. He was Chief Rabbi of Ireland (1979–1985) before relocating permanently to Israel in 1985. He has taken leave from his position as AJC's International Director of Interreligious Affairs in order to serve as Special Advisor to the Abrahamic Family House in Abu Dhabi. From 2005 until 2009 he headed the International Jewish Committee for Inter-religious Consultations (IJCIC), the broad-based coalition of Jewish organisations and denominations that represents World Jewry in its relations with other world religions.

Before being appointed Chief Rabbi of Ireland, he was the senior rabbi of the largest Orthodox Jewish congregation in South Africa (the Green and Sea Point Hebrew Congregation, Cape Town) and served as a judge on the Cape Beth Din (rabbinic court). He is also a board member of the Brussels-based organization CEJI - A Jewish Contribution to an Inclusive Europe, which promotes a Europe of diversity and respect.

== Early life and career ==
He was born in Newbury, Berkshire, England to Bella and Rabbi Kopul Rosen, founder of Carmel College, a Jewish boarding school for boys in Oxfordshire. He is the brother of Rabbis Jeremy Rosen (b. 1942) and Michael Rosen (21 January 1945 – 8 December 2008). He was ordained as an Orthodox rabbi at Yeshivat Har Etzion in Israel. In August 1973, he relocated to South Africa, where he was a student advisor to the South African Jewish Board of Deputies and the South African Zionist Federation. In March 1975, he succeeded Rabbi Newman, who had made aliyah to Israel, as rabbi of South Africa's largest Jewish congregation, the Marais Road Shul (formally known as the Green & Sea Point Hebrew Congregation) based in Sea Point in Cape Town. In South Africa, he was the youngest practicing rabbi in the country at the age of 24.

He dedicated many sermons on the incompatibility of Judaism and apartheid and attempted to foster a community stance on racial segregation. He refused to attend a function held by the Board of Deputies and the South African Zionist Federation that was honouring Prime Minister Vorster on his return from a visit to Israel in 1976. He received anonymous death threats and the security police tapped his phone. He was supported by most of the congregation, the Cape Jewish Board of Deputies and Rabbi Duschinsky, head of the Beth Din He co-founded the Cape Inter-Faith Forum, as it was one of the few avenues available at the time for bringing people of different races together. The forum representing Jews, Christians and Muslims was pioneering and one of the first of its kind in the world at that time. He also worked with other faith leaders and Reform colleagues at Temple Israel to set up a facility in the area to provide cheap meals for vagrants. At a special Republic Day service, he reiterated that religious leaders, particularly Jewish religious leaders, who separated politics from religion failed in their duty.

His stance on apartheid put him at odds with the government, and his work permit was not renewed by the government and he left South Africa after five years. Shortly afterwards, he was appointed Chief Rabbi of Ireland in 1979. At the end of his appointment, he left Ireland and made aliyah to Israel in 1985. He is based in Jerusalem, and also serves on the Chief Rabbinate of Israel's Commission for Interreligious Relations. In 2006 he co-authored The Christian and the Pharisee: Two Outspoken Religious Leaders Debate the Road to Heaven, a collection of his conversations with R. T. Kendall.

He is an international president of Religions for Peace; and serves as the only Jewish representative on the board of directors of the KAICIID Dialogue Centre (interfaith centre) established in 2012 by King Abdullah of Saudi Arabia together with the governments of Austria and Spain and the Vatican. He is honorary president of the International Council of Christians and Jews; and serves on the board of World Religious Leaders for the Elijah Interfaith Institute; and the World Council of Religious Leaders. In 2015, he attended a formal interfaith dialogue between Jewish leaders and scholars and their Orthodox Christian counterparts. He called for the Orthodox Christian leaders to issue a statement on the status of the Jewish people; “A doctrinal repudiation that the Jewish people had been rejected by God could have enormous consequences,”. He added that this would go a long way toward eliminating “traditional prejudice” toward Jews.

== Awards and honours ==
In November 2005, Rosen was made a Knight Commander of the Order of St. Gregory the Great in recognition of his contribution to Jewish-Catholic reconciliation, making him the first Israeli citizen and the first Orthodox rabbi to receive this honour. In the same year he also won the Mount Zion Award for Interreligious Understanding. In December 2006, he received the Raphael Lemkin Human Rights Award from Rabbis for Human Rights – North America for having founded the organization Rabbis for Human Rights. Rosen was appointed Commander of the Order of the British Empire (CBE) in the 2010 New Year Honours by Queen Elizabeth II. In 2012, he received the interfaith award from Search for Common Ground.

In 2016, he was awarded the Hubert Walter Award for Reconciliation and Interfaith Cooperation by the Archbishop of Canterbury "for his commitment and contribution to the work of Inter Religious relations between, particularly, the Jewish and Catholic faiths".

== Philosophy and views ==
=== Apartheid ===
In the 1970s he was a rabbi in South Africa during the apartheid-era: "It was obvious to me, as to so many people of faith, that this system that deprived people of their fundamental human rights, was in complete conflict with religious faith and with scriptural teaching that affirms the dignity of each and every human person of their fundamental, inalienable freedom and dignity, born out of the fact that each and every human being is created in the divine image, as indicated in Genesis."

=== Antisemitism ===
At the 2020 G20 interfaith forum, Rosen argues that overwhelming political prejudice towards Israel is an example of antisemitism: "the way in which Israel is often presented as the source of all problems and particularly for example, as the origin of the problems in the Middle East, as if it's somehow related to the Shia-Sunni conflict or the catastrophe in Syria or to the prosecution of Copts, or with regard to the collapse of other failed states in the Middle East, is fascinating in itself. In some senses, the Jewish collective entity has become a kind lightning conductor for all kinds of hang-ups or senses of historical injury that were transferred in some particular way to a Jewish collective entity."

=== Israel ===
Rosen wrote that, arguably, Israel's "greatest achievement lies in the democratic, civil and legal structure that despite the regional conflict, has been established and maintained by a population, over ninety percent of which does not originate from democratic pluralistic societies whether Eastern European or Islamic." He continues: "the national context has provided the security for a diverse spectrum of Jewish life to replenish and regenerate its ranks." Nevertheless, he concedes that there is "a lack of creative engagement between the Traditional Jewish religious heritage and the philosophical and cultural challenges of Modernity. Amost [sic] invariably the challenge is ignored, or more often than not, there is a compartmentalization in which the two are perceived as mutually contradictory by both sides of the secular/religious divide."

He supports the introduction of civil marriage in Israel, arguing: "To force a couple with no positive sentiment for religious tradition to have to go through a traditional religious ceremony, generally just causes greater alienation from that Tradition and often turns the ceremony into an embarrassment, if not a farce...There is thus a crucial need to end the monopoly of the Chief Rabbinate of Jewish marriage and introduce civil marriage, allowing couples to make their preferred choices accordingly."

=== Jerusalem ===
Rosen writes that: "Jerusalem is so inextricably part of Jewish religious consciousness and practice, as well as of its religious vision and hope...She is indeed "the house of our life"" He also asserts the significance of Jerusalem to all three Abrahamic religions: "For Jerusalem’s beauty, like any lasting beauty, is far more than skin deep. While she does have a lovely external aspect to her, her beauty is precisely the spiritual beauty that reflects the depths of devotion that made Jerusalem so significant to so many from the Traditions of Abraham – Jews, Christians and Muslims." He continues, "Yet it is when we truly respect the attachments of others to Jerusalem, that we shall, truly prosper morally and spiritually. Then Jerusalem will live up to its name as city of peace and the joy of the whole world."

== Personal life ==
He is married to Sharon (née Rothstein), who co-directs the Jerusalem office of Search for Common Ground. They have three daughters and six grandchildren.

== Vegetarianism ==
Rosen is the honorary president of the International Jewish Vegetarian and Ecology Society. He is a vigorous critic of factory farming, noting that "much of the current treatment of animals in the livestock trade makes the consumption of meat produced through such cruel conditions halachically unacceptable as the product of illegitimate means." In addition, he has argued that the waste of natural resources and the damage done to the environment by "meat production" make a compelling Jewish moral argument for adopting a vegan diet. He has written extensively on a wide variety of interfaith issues.

== See also ==
- History of the Jews in Ireland
- Jewish vegetarianism

Jewish titles
Preceded by Isaac Cohen	Chief Rabbi of Ireland; 1979–1985	Succeeded by Ephraim Mirvis
