= Marais Road Shul =

Modern Orthodox synagogue in Cape Town, South Africa

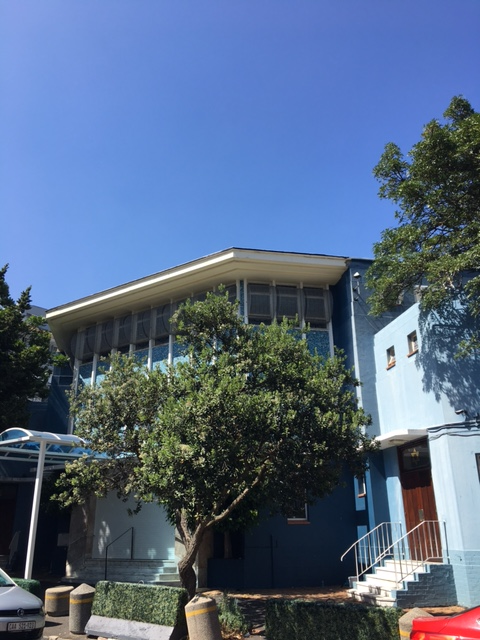
- The synagogue in 2024

- Location of the synagogue in Greater Cape Town

Religion
- Affiliation: Modern Orthodox Judaism
- Rite: Nusach Ashkenaz
- Ecclesiastical or organizational status: Synagogue
- Ownership: Green & Sea Point Hebrew Congregation
- Leadership: Rabbi Pini Hecht
- Status: Active

Location
- Location: 10 Marais Road, Sea Point, Cape Town
- Country: South Africa
- Interactive map of Marais Road Shul
- Coordinates: 33°54′47″S 18°23′23″E

Architecture
- Architect: J. Lonstein
- Type: Synagogue architecture
- Completed: 1934

Website
- .maraisroadshul.com

The Marais Road Shul, formally the Green & Sea Point Hebrew Congregation (G&SPHC), is a Modern Orthodox synagogue in Sea Point, a seaside suburb of Cape Town. The congregation was first established in 1926, and the synagogue was completed in 1934. It had initially intended to become a branch of the Gardens Shul in the City Bowl, but opted for independence, and became the larger of the two. It is the largest Jewish congregation in South Africa, and by 1994, it had become the largest in the Southern Hemisphere. The Sephardi Hebrew Congregation, established in 1960, also operates a shul from the G&SPHC's Weizmann Hall on Regent Road in Sea Point.

== History ==
=== Origins, Union of South Africa (1910–1948) ===
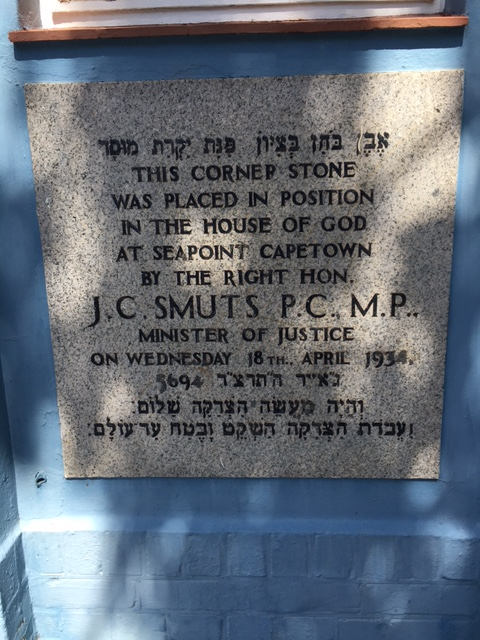
Corner stone laid by Jan Smuts in 1934

The congregation was first established in Sea Point in 1926 at Monreith, Hall Road, the home of Mr and Mrs Gutman. A meeting took place at their home to advance “representations of a number of the younger members of the Community for the purpose of electing a strong working Committee to go into the question of the proposed new Synagogue”. A constitution was drawn up, establishing; “the congregation shall function as an Orthodox Hebrew congregation and shall be known as the Green & Sea Point Hebrew Congregation, the holy congregation, the House of Jeshurun.” In the meantime, the Gutman family hosted services at their home, before the congregation hired premises at the Old Sea Point Town Hall.

The architect, J Lonstein was hired to design a new synagogue for the congregation and the building was completed in 1934, with Jan Smuts laying the cornerstone on April 18. The building is octagonal in shape and it was the first purpose-built synagogue on the Atlantic seaboard and was built to accommodate over nine hundred people. It was originally fitted with hard wood seating (upholstered in red leather), an Aron Kodesh panelled in teak and lighting that took the form of fluorescent tubes in the shape of a Magen David. The building was officially opened in September 1934 by Cape Town's Jewish mayor, Louis Gradner and it was consecrated by Rev. AP Bender, spiritual leader of Gardens Shul. Rev. P Rosenberg was the first spiritual leader of the newly built synagogue.

Shortly after its opening, a decision was made to establish a choir and the following year, Cantor Morris Katzin, from Riga, Latvia was appointed. The synagogue also had an organ and use of electricity was permitted on Shabbat and Jewish holidays. However, Rev Rosenberg's appointment was short-lived. He had been ordained at Jews' College in London and was dissatisfied with the Orthodox character of the congregation. He wrote to Lily Montagu, who had tasked Rabbi Moses Cyrus Weiler with bringing Reform Judaism to South Africa, and distanced himself from Orthodoxy. He supported the arrival of a Reform synagogue in Cape Town, anticipating it to have good chances of success. Rosenberg subsequently served both Reform and Orthodox congregations after his departure from Marais Road. Dr Herman Kramer, a long-time G&SPHC president later became president of Cape Town's first Reform congregation, Temple Israel. Rabbi Dr IH Levine succeeded Rev Rosenberg in 1936 and stayed on until 1940, after getting his doctorate. The congregation also established the Talmud Torah, which had 103 students and offered Junior Certificate and Matric classes in Hebrew by 1943. Rabbi Abe Tobie Shrock was appointed as the congregation's new spiritual leader in 1944, he was a graduate of Jews' College in London and had been the principal Jewish chaplain to the South African Defence Force, Acting Head of the Department of Hebrew at the University of Witwatersrand and rabbi of Yeoville Synagogue. Temple Israel was excluded from the induction ceremony for Rabbi Shrock. Rabbi Abrahams of the Gardens Shul only agreed to conduct the induction service on the condition that he alone would perform the ceremony. The congregation also donated a Sefer Torah to the SA Jewish War Appeal that was transported to Paris to be used by Jewish refugees in a DP camp.

=== Apartheid era (1948–1994) ===
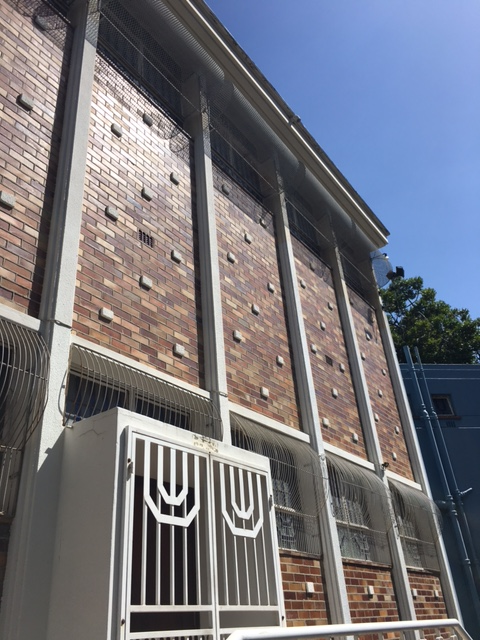
Marais Road Shul side view, from Graham Road

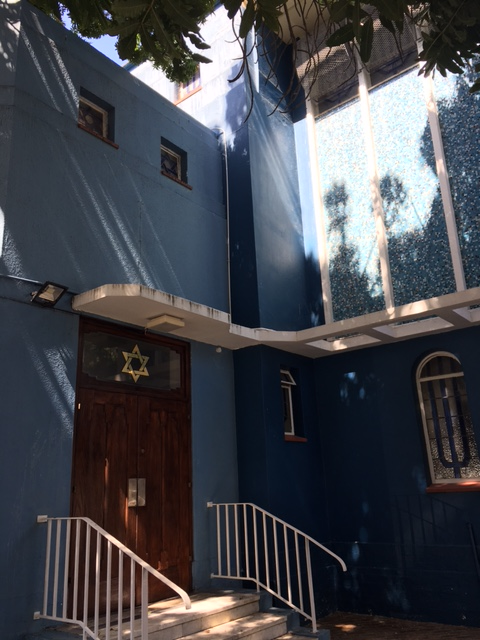
Marais Road Shul side entrance

Meanwhile, membership of the synagogue soared and additional premises had to be hired for High Holy Day services. The congregation eventually resolved to build a Communal Centre with a major and minor hall, a Talmud Torah and Nursery School. In 1950, the congregation seceded from the Cape Board of the South African Jewish Board of Deputies after a series of tensions between the congregation and the Gardens Shul, particularly between Rabbi Shrock and Rabbi Abrahams. In 1949, Abrahams had blocked Shrock's appointment to the Beit Din. They also stood opposed to Abrahams' appointment as Chief Rabbi of Cape Town, and rejected the notion of a Chief Rabbi for the Cape. This would allow Abrahams to interfere in the running of the G&SPHC and presume a higher status than Rabbi Shrock. The congregation's representatives did not attend a vote for a Chief Rabbi and in their absence, Rabbi Abrahams was elected, with Rabbi Shrock as deputy Chief Rabbi. Shrock rejected the position and the congregation left the Cape Board of Deputies and United Council of Synagogues. A decision was made to federate with the Roeland Street and Vredehoek synagogues to strengthen their position. The congregation rejoined the UC in 1955 on the condition that by rejoining, it did not imply that the congregation would be under the authority of the Cape Chief Rabbi and that the synagogue would remain independent.

Rabbi Shrock resigned from his position in the same year, becoming Chief Rabbi of the Durban Hebrew Congregation and Rabbi of the Communities of Natal (1956–65). Meanwhile, in rejoining the UC, the congregation's independence was curtailed; ″Only the UC executive could decide which rabbis could join the Beth Din. All synagogues had to accept the UC constitution without reserve. All communal services would be arranged only by the UC. All special prayers would be issued only by the Chief Rabbi. All the sermons at all radio broadcasts, communal services and functions arranged by the Beth Din and the UC would be delivered by the Chief Rabbi in his capacity as spiritual head. If the Chief Rabbi decided to allow another rabbi to do so he insisted on vetting and editing their sermon beforehand.″ Tensions eased in 1969, when the position of Cape Chief Rabbi was abolished and a decision was made that there would only be one Chief Rabbi in South Africa, and he would be based in Johannesburg.

The synagogue's Weizmann Hall, the largest Jewish communal hall in the Cape was used for Jewish functions and the wider Cape public. In 1958 it hosted a concert for the 1956 Treason Trial. The G&SPHC allowed the concert on the condition that the organisation hiring the hall was a registered welfare fund assisting members of the families of the accused and that no advertising or tickets should give the impression that the organisation responsible for the concert was of a political nature, and no speeches or addresses could be made on the night of the concert. In 1962 they rejected a request by the National Party to hire the hall, on the grounds that it was not to be used for public political meetings. They allowed the Board of Deputies to host a lecture by visiting Rabbi Solomon Freehof, president of the Central Conference of American Rabbis and the World Union for Progressive Judaism.

The synagogue also began to accommodate for Sephardi Jews that arrived as refugees from the Congo, others had been deported from Egypt and a third wave came from Rhodesia. As their community grew, they sought services that were conducted in a Sephardi style rather than the prevalent Ashkenazi style at the synagogue. Therefore, they were permitted to hold their own services in the Weizmann Hall. As their number continued to increase and the community became more settled, they built their own shul in the Weizmann Minor Hall, employing its own rabbi and administrative staff

In 1975, Rabbi David Rosen, a young rabbi from England was hired. He dedicated many sermons to the incompatibility of Judaism and apartheid and attempted to foster a community stance on racial segregation. He was also heavily involved in interfaith activities, as the founder and chairman of Cape Inter-Faith Forum, the Council of Jews, Christians and Muslims, later the Cape Town Interfaith Initiative. He also worked with Reform colleagues at Temple Israel to set up a facility in the area to provide cheap meals for vagrants. At a special Republic Day service, he reiterated that religious leaders, particularly Jewish religious leaders, who separated politics from religion failed in their duty. He also refused to attend a function held by the Board of Deputies and the South African Zionist Federation that was honouring Prime Minister Vorster on his return from a visit to Israel in 1976. He received anonymous death threats and the security police tapped his phone. He was supported by most of the congregation, the Cape Jewish Board of Deputies and Rabbi Duschinsky, head of the Beth Din. His work permit was not renewed by the government after five years in the country Rabbi Rosen was replaced by Rabbi Dr Elihu Jack Steinhorn from New York City, who had previously served Congregation Agudath Sholom in Stamford, Connecticut. He had also trained under Rabbi Joseph Ber Soloveitchik, a prominent figure in Modern Orthodoxy, and held a PhD in philosophy from New York University.

=== Post-apartheid period (1994–present) ===
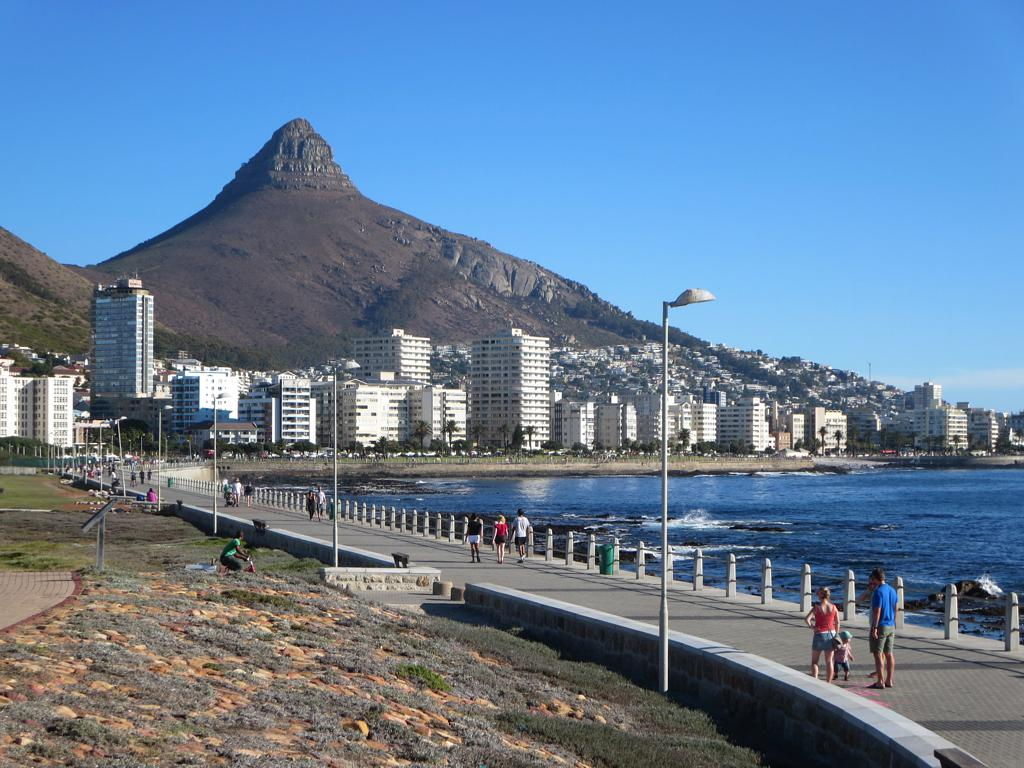
The synagogue is located in Sea Point

The synagogue was a polling station in the 1994 South African general election and President Nelson Mandela visited the congregation in May of the same year. In his address, he appealed to Jewish expatriates to return to South Africa. In 1998, the synagogue was the intended target of a bomb attack by PAGAD, however, it's cell noticed that the synagogue had security and decided instead to bomb the Wynberg synagogue. Shortly afterwards, a Youth Centre, where all local Jewish children could congregate and socialise was constructed. The synagogue also developed retail stores in the vacant Weizmann foyer that served only as an entrance to the Hall and Sephardi Shul upstairs and generates income from renting the retail units.

Rabbi Steinhorn's middle of the road Orthodoxy was at odds with the increasingly religious Chief Rabbinate in Johannesburg, where a Jewish religious revival had taken place. In 1999, the Beit Din instructed the G&SPHC committee to retire Steinhorn, and they refused. Then the Chief Rabbi Cyril Harris and other rabbis sent letters to the 1, 300 members of the congregation. The letter informed the members that the committee had refused their request to retire Rabbi Steinhorn, and that the rabbi would be declared persona non grata. They reasoned that Rabbi Steinhorn was in breach of contract as he had refused to respect the authority of the Chief Rabbi. Then the rabbinate made claims that Rabbi Steinhorn had failed to act in accordance with principles of halacha. He was accused of having included people who were not Jewish in certain ceremonies, and of having given Jewish burials to people who might not have been Jewish. They ordered rabbis to refuse to officiate with Rabbi Steinhorn at any religious occasions including shiva prayers. The legality of the weddings at which he officiated, his recommendations on potential converts and his rabbinic statements would no longer be considered valid. No weddings Rabbi Steinhorn conducted would be regarded as legitimate nor would the offspring of those weddings be regarded as Jewish or in their turn be able to marry Jewish people. However, the congregation defied the chief rabbinate and instead backed Rabbi Steinhorn. The Chief Rabbinate also complained that the congregation had invited Dr Azila Talit Reisenberger, an Israeli-born theologian, at the University of Cape Town to address the congregation. Rabbi Harris later apologised to Dr Reisenberger admitting that his statements had been incorrect and defamatory.

In 2002, there was a fresh dispute between the synagogue and the Chief Rabbinate. The previous year, the synagogue had married its deputy president, Saul Berman to Karin Barnard, ex-wife of heart surgeon Christiaan Barnard. Karin had converted to Judaism by Rabbi Edmond Amsellem in Paris, however, the Chief Rabbi and the local Beth Din would not recognise the conversion as valid nor the marriage or the Jewishness of the child she was carrying. However, Rabbi Steinhorn defended the conversion as valid. The synagogue's committee considered disaffiliating from the Union of Orthodox Synagogues and setting up it own Beit Din. Eventually, the decision was taken to stay in the Union and to re-establish a sense of harmony, with Rabbi Steinhorn retiring in 2004.

In the 2000s, the synagogue faced challenges that were common to congregations everywhere such as aging congregations, expensive infrastructure and younger generations that were less interested in religious observance. There were also numerical challenges, Cape Town's Jewish population had peaked at 25, 000 but had declined to 15, 000 as people opted for smaller families than generations before them. In the face of these challenges, the decision was made to concentrate more efforts into making the synagogue into a vibrant community centre, a vision that both Rabbis Rosen and Steinhorn had in mind. Rabbi Levi Silman had joined as Youth rabbi to work with people from eighteen to thirty-five. Rabbi Silman introduced separate youth services on Fridays in the Small shul. The congregation also responded to the May 2008 South Africa riots in providing shelter and food in the Weizmann Hall to 200 displaced people.

In 2010, the synagogue engaged its present senior rabbi, Rabbi Dovid Wineberg from the Chabad movement. He brought back certain practices that had fallen into disuse. Rabbi Pini Hecht, also from the Chabad movement, has been with the congregation since 2013 as an assistant rabbi, and as a rabbi since 2022.

== Notable members ==
- Dennis Davis, Judge of the High Court of South Africa and Judge President of the Competition Appeal Court of South Africa
- Rael Levitt, entrepreneur
- Rabbi David Rosen, served the congregation from 1975-1979 and later became Chief Rabbi of Ireland
