= Union for Progressive Judaism =

- Theology: Progressive Judaism
- President: Roger Mendelson
- Associations: World Union for Progressive Judaism
- Region: Australia, New Zealand and Asia
- Headquarters: 28 Chatswood Avenue, Chatswood, New South Wales, 2067
- Origin: 1931
- Congregations: 27
- Official website: www.upj.org.au

The Union for Progressive Judaism is an affiliate of the World Union for Progressive Judaism and supports 27 progressive congregations in Australia, New Zealand and Asia. The movement serves about a fifth of the region's affiliated community. The UPJ is represented on the major communal bodies in Australia, such as the Executive Council of Australian Jewry, the Zionist Federation of Australia (ZFA) and Zionism Victoria.

== History ==
The World Union for Progressive Judaism responded to the burgeoning interest in Progressive Judaism in Australia and supported the development of lay leadership and progressive congregations. A pivotal figure was Ada Phillips who met Lily Montagu and Israel Mattuck in London in 1928. She returned to Melbourne and aroused interest in the movement and thus the WUPJ agreed to finance the salary of an American rabbi. Initial progress was slow as the rabbi's radical inclinations did not win favour among a local Jewish community that valued traditions. The situation changed when the WUPJ sent Herman Sanger, a German refugee and rabbi. Sanger was charismatic, championed Zionism and upheld the religious traditions Jewish German liberalism. Membership also grew as more refugees began to arrive in Melbourne from Germany. Melbourne's Temple Beth Israel introduced egalitarian seating whilst kipah and talit were the custom. From the beginning, women were accepted as equal in congregational life, and in 1981 American-born Karen Soria was appointed as assistant minister and the first female rabbi. The Progressive movement also welcomed converts to Judaism and accepted patrilineal descent, provided the person had received a Jewish education (Meyer 1988). In 1938, Sanger established Temple Emanuel in Sydney which grew rapidly under the leadership of American Rabbi Max Schenk. Progressive Judaism was established later in smaller urban centres across Australia (Rutland 2005). A level of tolerance existed between Progressive and Orthodox communities in the nineteen-thirties and forties. This began to diminish in the 1950s as traditionalist rabbis refused to appear on the same platform as their progressive counterparts (Meyer 1988).

== Beliefs ==
The denomination shares the basic tenets of Reform Judaism (alternatively known also as Progressive or Liberal) worldwide: a theistic, personal God; an ongoing revelation, under the influence of which all scripture was written – but not dictated by providence – that enables contemporary Jews to reach new religious insights without necessarily being committed to the conventions of the past; regarding the ethical and moral values of Judaism as its true essence, while ritual and practical observance are means to achieve spiritual elation and not an end to themselves – and therefore, rejecting the binding nature of Jewish law; a belief in the coming of a Messianic era rather than a personal Messiah, and in immortality of the soul only, instead of bodily resurrection. Prayers referring to such concepts were omitted from the liturgy, and traditional practices abolished or altered considerably.

=== Marriage ===
A 2007 resolution allows synagogues to decide about blessing of same-sex unions, and a 2011 resolution allows local synagogues to decide about same-sex marriage.

== Organisational structure ==
The highest concentration of progressive congregants are in Australia, where they represent 20% of the nation's affiliated Jewish community. A majority of affiliated Australian Jews join Modern Orthodox congregations, although only about 6% of Australian Jews are practicing Orthodox. Most recently, Conservative Judaism was introduced into Australian Jewish life. The Progressive movement has not expanded rapidly as the main sources of Jewish migrants (South Africa, the former Soviet Union and Israel) have a relatively modest tradition of Reform Judaism (Ehrlich 2009). According to Dana Evan Kaplan, the establishment of Progressive Jewish Day school has been a factor in maintaining and stabilizing the community's numbers (Kaplan 2000). Progressive Judaism in Australia has traditionally been more conservative in practice than its larger counterpart in the United States where Reform Judaism is the largest Jewish movement in the country (Meyer 1988).

== See also ==
- History of the Jews in Australia
- Australian Jews

== Bibliography ==
- Ehrlich, Mark Avrum (2009). Encyclopedia of the Jewish Diaspora: Origins, Experiences, and Culture. ABC-CLIO. p. 525. ISBN 978-1851098736.
- Kaplan, Dana Evan (2000). "Chapter 17: Reform Judaism". In Neusner, Jacob (ed.). The Blackwell Companion to Judaism. Blackwell. pp. 291–311. ISBN 9781577180586.
- Meyer, Michael A. (1988). Response to Modernity: A History of the Reform Movement in Judaism. Wayne State University Press. p. 342. ISBN 1851098739.
- Rutland, Suzanne D. (2005). The Jews in Australia. Cambridge University Press. p. 94. ISBN 9780511481277.
