= Beit Emanuel, Johannesburg =

Reform Jewish synagogue in South Africa

Beit Emanuel
- Location of the synagogue in Greater Johannesburg

Religion
- Affiliation: Reform Judaism
- Ecclesiastical or organisational status: Synagogue
- Leadership: Rabbi Chava Koster
- Year consecrated: 1954
- Status: Active

Location
- Location: 38 Oxford Road, Parktown, Johannesburg, Gauteng 2193
- Country: South Africa
- Coordinates: 26°10′08″S 28°02′42″E

Architecture
- Architect: Harold Le Roith
- Type: Synagogue architecture
- Style: Modernist
- Completed: 1954

Website
- beitemanuel.co.za

Beit Emanuel, formally the Temple Emamuel, is a Progressive Jewish congregation and synagogue, located in Parktown, a suburb of Johannesburg, in the district of Gauteng, South Africa. The synagogue was established in 1954 and is one of the largest Progressive Jewish congregations in South Africa. It is an affiliate of the South African Union for Progressive Judaism (SAUPJ), which is part of the World Union for Progressive Judaism (WUPJ).

== History ==
There had been advanced plans for a progressive synagogue in Parktown since the early 1930s. After the arrival of Rabbi Moses Cyrus Weiler in South Africa in 1933, a plot was purchased on Empire Road, Parktown and Weiler hired Herman Kallenbach to build a grand synagogue with lush gardens and where Weiler would serve as rabbi. However, just as building work was set to commence, a neighbourhood petition circulated against plans for a synagogue in a residential area. Eventually a decision was made to sell the plot and buy a smaller 3/4 of an acre plot on Paul Nel Street in Hillbrow, where there were already synagogues such as the Great Synagogue and Poswohl Synagogue. Kallenbach used the same Art Deco design that he and his partners A.M. Kennedy and A.S. Furner had prepared for the Parktown site, but scaled it down according to the smaller plot size. Twenty years later, Beit Emanuel, was established in Parktown in 1954. The architect, Harold Le Roith delivered a modernist and minimalist design.

In 1993 there were divisions in Johannesburg's Progressive community when Beit Emanuel's congregational rabbi, Ady Asabi declared that it and the Imanu-Shalom congregations would become independent and Masorti synagogues, breaking with the SAUPJ and Progressive Judaism. A court case ensued to retain both of the congregations under the SAUPJ. Beit Emanuel returned to the SAUPJ following an agreement and Shalom became independent and Masorti. Today the synagogue has moved away from the formality of conventional Reform Judaism and instead concentrates on prayers (ancient and modern) that encourage greater congregant participation.

In 1995, president Nelson Mandela addressed 2,000 people at the synagogue and made appeals against white emigration; "Don't leave, don't let us down. You have nothing to fear... My duty is to unite the people of South Africa. I have no time to indulge in party politics"

== Religious tradition ==
Jocelyn Hellig, professor of religious studies and one of the best-known interpreters of South African Judaism, described the Progressive community as conservative in religious practice. This was also given as an explanation for the relatively modest presence of Masorti Judaism in the country. In 1986, the synagogue's US-born rabbi, Norman Mendel told an audience that Progressive Jewry in the country were leading the Jewish struggle against the "indefensible, immoral and evil." policies of apartheid. He said that Progressive Jews are opposing apartheid "against a backdrop of Jewish discrimination" from the Orthodox community. "There is day to day diminishment in the Reform movement in South Africa. Reform are considered a second class Jewish community," he added.

== Notable members ==
- Helen Suzman, politician
- Jeremy Gordin, journalist

== See also ==
- History of the Jews in South Africa
- List of synagogues in South Africa
