= David Hoffman (rabbi) =

American rabbi (1954–2011)

Rabbi David Hoffman

Personal life
- Born: David Nachum Hoffman; 1 February 1954 Los Angeles, California, United States
- Died: 7 March 2011 (aged 57) Lancaster, California, United States
- Buried: Mount Sinai Memorial Park
- Spouse: Beverley Ann Rosenbaum (1979 - Mar 7 2011)
- Children: 4
- Education: University of California Los Angeles; Hebrew University of Jerusalem; Jewish Theological Seminary of America

Religious life
- Religion: Judaism
- Denomination: Conservative Judaism
- Synagogue: Temple Israel, Cape Town
- Position: Rabbi

David Nachum Hoffman (1 February 1954 - 7 March 2011) was an American rabbi. He was best known as the spiritual leader of Temple Israel in Cape Town, South Africa from 1989 - 2006.

== Early life and career ==
He was born in Los Angeles, California to parents, Samuel Rubin Hoffman (1928–2004) and Rochelle Chalip Hoffman (1926–1998). His father was a scientist and public school teacher who founded Camp Kinneret in Agoura, California in 1954 together with his wife.

Rabbi Hoffman graduated from UCLA and later studied at Hebrew University of Jerusalem. He completed his rabbinical studies at the Jewish Theological Seminary of America where he was ordained as a Conservative rabbi.

Rabbi Hoffman was the Chairperson of the Interfaith Forum in Cape Town. He participated in this capacity in the Parliament of the World's Religions in 1999.

He was prolific in Capetonian media, often writing articles in dialogue about Israel, and political issues in South Africa such as the death penalty. He worked with journalists such as Joel Pollak. Hoffman publicly debated Uri Davis

Hoffman had public printed debates with Archbishop Desmond Tutu, which led to his inviting him to Temple Israel.

Hoffman was known as a man of conviction and principle. He marched with Zackie Achmat and other religious leaders to demand governmental supply of anti-retroviral drugs for HIV/AIDS sufferers in South Africa.
