= Isaac Cohen =

British rabbi (1914–2007)

- Dr Isaac Cohen
- Title: Chief Rabbi of Ireland

Personal life
- Born: Isaac Cohen; 26 July 1914 Llanelli, Wales
- Died: 30 November 2007 (aged 93) Jerusalem, Israel
- Spouse: Fanny Weisfogel
- Occupation: Chief Rabbi

Religious life
- Religion: Judaism
- Denomination: Orthodox

Jewish leader
- Predecessor: Immanuel Jakobovits, Baron Jakobovits
- Successor: David Rosen
- Position: Chief Rabbi
- Began: 1959
- Ended: 1979
- Other: Chief Rabbi of Ireland

Isaac Cohen (26 July 1914 – 30 November 2007) was a British Talmudic scholar and Chief Rabbi of Ireland for 20 years.

== Education ==
Born in Llanelli, Wales to immigrants from Lithuania, he won a scholarship in 1928 to Aria College in Portsmouth, a boarding school which combined Jewish study with a place at Portsmouth Grammar School. In 1931 he enrolled at Jews College and University College London and gained a Bachelor of Arts in Semitics in 1935. In 1939 he married Fanny Weisfogel of London and they settled in Leeds. After the Second World War, he returned to London to complete his rabbinical diploma, which he gained in 1948, and subsequently took up a rabbinical position in Edinburgh. In 1956 he gained his PhD from the University of Edinburgh for research into Talmudic thought.

== Appointments ==
His first post was at Harrow and Kenton Synagogue in Middlesex in 1935. In 1939 he moved to Leeds United Hebrew Congregation in the capacity of an additional minister in the Moortown area. He set up a Citizens Advice Bureau to help Jewish evacuees from London and was an officiating chaplain for Jewish Servicemen. In 1947 he succeeded Dr Salis Daiches as rabbi of the Edinburgh Hebrew Congregation. In 1956 he succeeded Rabbi Dr Immanuel Jakobovits as the Dublin-based Chief Rabbi of Ireland. During this time he also served as the Av Beth Din in Dublin. With the decline of the Irish community, he considered leading a community in London or taking up a position at the London Beth Din. He ended up remaining in Dublin until retiring in 1979 and eventually settled in Jerusalem, Israel.

== Legacy ==
While officiating in Dublin he promoted Jewish education and dealt with problems involving the supply of kosher food. He was active in the Soviet Jewry Campaign and encouraged his community's support for Israel.

His main work was his 25-year study Acts of the Mind in Jewish Ritual Law – An Insight into Rabbinic Psychology which was published two weeks before his death. The book was requested by the University of Edinburgh in order to award him an honorary doctorate.

== Sources ==
- (25 January 2008). Obituaries: Rabbi Dr Isaac Cohen. The Jewish Chronicle, p. 32.
- Chief Rabbi Isaac Cohen – tribute on his first Yahrzeit

Jewish titles
Preceded by Immanuel Jakobovits	Chief Rabbi of Ireland; 1959–1979	Succeeded by David Rosen
