= The Daniel Centers =

Reform Jewish organization and synagogue in Tel Aviv, Israel

Beit Daniel Synagogue

Religion
- Affiliation: Reform Judaism
- Ecclesiastical or organisational status: Synagogue
- Ownership: Kehilat Halev
- Leadership: Rabbi Meir Azari; Rabbi Galia Sadan
- Status: Active

Location
- Location: Tel Aviv
- Country: Israel

Architecture
- Funded by: Gerard and Ruth Daniel
- Completed: 1991

Website
- beit-daniel.org.il

The Daniel Centers for Progressive Judaism is a Reform Jewish congregation and synagogue based in Tel Aviv, Israel. The Daniel Centers consist of the Beit Daniel synagogue and Kehilat Halev congregation in Tel Aviv and the Mishkenot Ruth Daniel hostel and community center in Jaffa. The Beit Daniel synagogue was established in 1991.

The current rabbis are Rabbi Meir Azari and Rabbi Galia Sadan.

== History ==
The Daniel Centers were founded by Gerard and Ruth Daniel, a business family of German birth who had migrated to the United States and established a firm in the aerospace technology business and later a real estate business in Florida. While living in the United States, the Daniels became involved in Reform Jewish causes, with Gerard becoming president of the World Union for Progressive Judaism and Ruth concurrently becoming treasurer of the organization from 1980 to 1988. The family established the Beit Daniel synagogue in 1991, and later the Mishkenot Ruth Daniel in 2007 following Ruth's death. The Beit Daniel synagogue's construction went up against legal opposition, with the family fighting up to the Supreme Court of Israel for the right to build the synagogue.

Journalist and former Finance Minister Yair Lapid, who identifies as hiloni, has written extensively of his frequent attendance and experience at Beit Daniel.

== Beliefs ==
=== Marriage ===
The synagogue has an inclusive vision and celebrates both opposite-sex marriages and same-sex marriages.

== See also ==
- History of the Jews in Israel
- List of synagogues in Israel
