= Moses Cyrus Weiler =

Latvian-born South African rabbi

Rabbi Moses Cyrus Weiler
- משה חיים ויילר

Personal life
- Born: Moses Cyrus Weiler; 23 March 1907 Riga, Latvia
- Died: 4 December 2000 (aged 93) Jerusalem, Israel
- Buried: Jerusalem, Israel
- Spouse: Una Gelman
- Children: 6
- Parents: Zalman Dov Ber Weiler (father); Hannah Weiler (née Hurwitz) (mother)
- Education: University of Delaware; Hebrew Union College – Jewish Institute of Religion

Religious life
- Religion: Judaism
- Denomination: Reform Judaism

Jewish leader
- Synagogue: Temple Israel
- Organisation: United Jewish Progressive Congregation

Moses Cyrus Weiler (Hebrew: משה חיים ויילר; 23 March 1907 – 4 December 2000) was a Latvian-born South African rabbi and founder of Reform Judaism in the country. He was Chief Minister of the United Jewish Progressive Congregation (later the South African Union for Progressive Judaism) and served as rabbi of Temple Israel in Hillbrow, Johannesburg, the mother synagogue of the country's Reform movement. He is credited with growing the movement, with 25 congregations established during his tenure. He made aliyah to Israel in 1958, where he spent the second part of his life.

== Early life ==
Weiler was born in Riga, Latvia to Zalman Dov Ber Weiler and Hannah Weiler (née Hurwitz). He came from a long line of Orthodox rabbis, his father, grandfathers and great-grandfathers were all rabbis. His father emigrated to Mandatory Palestine and in the absence of finding suitable work as a rabbi, went into business. He noticed the lack of readily available chocolate in the country and decided to start a chocolate factory and imported coffee beans from Brazil. His son meanwhile attended Herzliya Hebrew Gymnasium, the country's first Hebrew high school. He was academically gifted and Cyrus Adler offered him a scholarship to study in the United States. He graduated with a BA from the University of Delaware and taught Hebrew at a local school. He then studied at Hebrew Union College – Jewish Institute of Religion in Cincinnati, a Jewish seminary where he was ordained as a Reform rabbi in 1933. Weiler spurned the Orthodoxy of his forefathers as he believed that Reform Judaism offered the best way to keep young people connected to their faith.

== Career ==
He emigrated to South Africa in 1933 at age 26 after being hired by Lily Montagu and Abraham Zevi Idelsohn to found the country's first Reform congregation. He quickly developed a reputation as a gifted orator and could give lectures and sermons in English, Hebrew, Yiddish and German. The Zionist Record, a local Jewish periodical, distanced themselves from an alignment with Reform Judaism, yet described a speech by Weiler as “the most outstanding literary lecture that has ever been delivered in Johannesburg”. After his arrival, a plot was purchased on Empire Road, Parktown and Weiler hired Herman Kallenbach to build a grand synagogue with lush gardens and where Weiler would serve as rabbi. However, just as building work was set to commence, a neighbourhood petition circulated against plans for a synagogue in a residential area. Eventually, a decision was made to sell the plot and buy a smaller plot on Paul Nel Street in Hillbrow, where there were already several Orthodox synagogues such as the Great Synagogue and Poswohl Synagogue. Kallenbach used the same Art Deco design, but scaled it down according to the smaller plot size.

Weiler fostered what has been referred to as ‘Weilerism’, a specific form of Reform Judaism specific to a South African context. This was "rather more cautious than the principles of his American and British counterparts" however, still quite radical by South African standards. Weiler was keen to replicate a trend in American Reform Judaism, where Bar Mitzvah at age 13 was replaced with Confirmation at age 16, requiring students to study for an exam and then lead a service. However, in Johannesburg, there was instant backlash to the Christian-sounding name of Confirmation and because of the ingrained rite of passage that a Bar Mitzvah held for Jewish boys. Weiler quickly reintroduced Bar Mitzah and any dedicated students that were committed to Conformation did so under the guise of Hebrew names such as Bnei Emunah. The innovations in the services included the use of English alongside Hebrew, and the Hazzan was also replaced by professional mixed choirs. Weiler also made it compulsory for men to wear a kippah and tallit in services, likewise he expected women to cover their heads too.

He was an early proponent of gender equality as he insisted on holding Friday night Shabbat service at a later hour, from 8.15pm. He understood that Shabbat meal preparation often prevented women from attending services, and with his innovation they could attend after the meal. Shortly after his arrival in South Africa he instructed women members to form a Sisterhood that would take charge of catering, care of the sick, and charitable outreach. The Sisterhood was also entitled to elect two women to the management executive. He also pioneered the introduction of Bat Mitzvah ceremonies in the country. He did not deem it compulsory for congregants to follow kosher dietary laws (Kashrut), however, observance was encouraged. He also introduced a strong emphasis on Zionism, his congregation started the first local services where Hebrew had Israeli-style Sephardic pronunciation rather than Ashkenazic. Hatikvah, the national anthem of the State of Israel was also sung alongside God Save the King. He attempted to advance a free membership model whereby the synagogue would be entirely funded by the city's wealthiest Jewish individuals such as mining magnates. The model was not feasible, an unsuccessful proposal was made to Ernest Oppenheimer, who was uninterested in Judaism.

In 1945 he visited Alexandra township, where he recognised the need for a school. He worked with his wife Una and the United Sisterhood of progressive Jewry to achieve his vision. The school was opened officially by the mayor of Johannesburg and renamed the MC Weiler School, in honour of Rabbi Weiler. In 1950, The New York Times reported on Weiler's trip to New York where he was speaking at Temple Israel of the City of New York: "It is important that Reform Jewry in the United States take more interest in the welfare of progressive Judaism abroad and embark upon a Reform Jewish Marshall Plan. It should assist the progressive Jewish communities abroad morally and financially."

Although Weiler had been tasked with establishing a national Reform movement, he resisted establishing other congregations outside Hillbrow during his first ten years. He felt that it was more important to build a significant membership at Temple Israel before expanding nationwide. In 1943, he agreed to help set up the first progressive congregation in Cape Town, Temple Israel in Green Point. Weiler's friend and Hebrew Union classmate, Rabbi Dr David Sherman was hired. Weiler was surprised at its burgeoning success with just under 25% of Cape Town Jewry affiliating themselves with Reform Judaism in a short time. In comparison, the percentage of Johannesburg Jews affiliated to the Reform branch has always been under 10%. Between the 1940s - 1960s there was a Johannesburg-Cape Town cultural split when progressive Jewish leadership in Cape Town rejected a proposal for the creation of the position of Chief Minister under which all Progressive congregations would fall. The appointee would have been Rabbi Weiler, who was based in Johannesburg. Weiler had sent Victor Brasch as his emissary to Cape Town to assure the community of the need for central control, based in Johannesburg, and ensuring that each congregation follow the same formula. However, Cape Town wanted a looser federation where each city made its own decisions and pushed back against the notion of a Chief Minister, arguing that it was against the democratic principles of Reform Judaism. In 1951, Cape Town quit the South African Union for Progressive Judaism and refused to return until 1963.

=== Aliyah ===
Weiler was deeply upset by the schism with Cape Town and he made aliyah to Israel in 1958, as his father and grandfather had also done so. In 1960, he was hired by Samuel Bronfman as chairman of the administrative committee of “Beth Hatfutzot” (House of Jewish Communities), a project that is today known as ANU - Museum of the Jewish People. “Beth Hatfutzot” was intended as an institute for the development of studies of diaspora Jewish communities. The intention was to host seminars, conferences, assemblies and lectures on the diaspora communities. As part of his position, Weiler visited South Africa, Europe, Latin America and other diaspora communities.

Two year later, the Jewish National Fund appointed Weiler as personal advisor to the chairman of the board of directors of the JNF. Weiler dealt specifically with matters appertaining to the international Jewish organizations and the Jewry on the American continent. Since arriving in the country, Weiler was already serving as an executive of the World Jewish Congress. He also enrolled in advanced Jewish studies in Jerusalem and in 1962 was involved in establishing and chairing a new, independent and egalitarian congregation, Mevakshei Derech. He also served as rabbi at the Progressive Community Synagogue in Tel Aviv.

Further to this, he lectured at Hebrew Union College – Jerusalem, was an emissary abroad for the United Jewish Appeal, and he accompanied Menachem Begin when he made his historic peace trip to Egypt in 1979. In August 1983 he flew to Johannesburg to attend the 50th anniversary of his former congregation, Temple Israel in Hillbrow. However, a limpet mine exploded outside the synagogue, four hours before State President Marais Viljoen and Weiler were scheduled to attend the anniversary ceremony. There were no injuries but the blast destroyed walls, ripped out windows and seats and turned cupboards and furniture upside down. Nonetheless, the ceremony went ahead with Viljoen and Weiler in attendance. Mahommed Iqbal Shaik of the Dolphin Unit of Umkhonto we Sizwe (MK) later assumed responsibility during the Truth and Reconciliation Commission hearings and he was granted amnesty. His final visit to South Africa was in 1995 at the age of 88, where he was invited to the 50th anniversary of the MC Weiler School in Alexandra.

== Personal life ==
In 1941 he was sent to Bulawayo in then-Southern Rhodesia by the South African Zionist Federation to raise support. He met his future wife, Una Gelman at a lecture he was giving. The couple subsequently had six children together and lived in a large home in Riviera between Houghton Estate and Saxonwold. Upon making aliyah to Israel in 1958, the family lived on Kibbutz Usha for two years, before relocating to Haifa and settling permanently in Jerusalem. Two sons, Adam and Gideon were killed in combat serving the Israel Defense Forces. Adam was killed in the War of Attrition in 1970 and Gideon was killed on the third day of the Yom Kippur War at age 23. Louis Isaac Rabinowitz, former Chief Rabbi of South Africa was on a committee of rabbis that honoured the brothers with the creation of The Adam and Gideon Weiler Garden in Eilat, which serves as a recreation area and a sports field. A number of bursaries and scholarships also exist in the names of the brothers at Sussex University (Adam's alma mater) and at Ben Gurion University. The brothers are buried at Mount Herzl military cemetery. Weiler became a counselor after their deaths, supporting those that lost loved ones during the Holocaust and the wars in Israel.
