= Temple Israel (Johannesburg) =

Progressive Jewish synagogue in Johannesburg, South Africa

- Location of the synagogue in Greater Johannesburg

Religion
- Affiliation: Reform Judaism
- Ecclesiastical or organizational status: Synagogue
- Leadership: Reeva Forman (chair)
- Status: Active

Location
- Location: Paul Nel Street, Hillbrow, Johannesburg, Gauteng 2001
- Country: South Africa
- Interactive map of Temple Israel
- Coordinates: 26°11′05″S 28°02′53″E

Architecture
- Architect: Hermann Kallenbach
- Type: Synagogue architecture
- Style: Art Deco
- Established: 1935 (as a congregation)
- Groundbreaking: September 22, 1935
- Completed: 1936

Website
- templeisraelh.org.za

The Temple Israel is a Progressive Jewish congregation and synagogue, located in Hillbrow, a suburb of Johannesburg, in the district of Gauteng, South Africa. Designed by Hermann Kallenbach in the Art Deco style, the synagogue was completed in 1936 and is the oldest of eleven Progressive synagogues in South Africa. The synagogue is classified as a provincial heritage site. The congregation is affiliated with the South African Union for Progressive Judaism (SAUPJ), which is part of the World Union for Progressive Judaism (WUPJ).

Temple Israel officially opened on August 23, 1936, as the mother synagogue of Progressive Judaism in the country. Johannesburg mayor Maurice Freeman, a member of the Jewish community, laid the cornerstone on September 22, 1935. The founding rabbi was Moses Cyrus Weiler.

== Progressive Judaism ==
The progressive streams of Judaism began during the Enlightenment in 18th-century Europe, and was brought to South Africa in the 1930s by Jews fleeing persecution in Central and Eastern Europe. Progressive Judaism aims to strike a balance between modernity and tradition. Progressive Judaism has given prominence to the moral commands over the ritual observances. This is not to abandon rituals altogether, but to highlight that by themselves they are insufficient unless they are accompanied by ethical conduct. This means that the movement is supportive of egalitarian seating and female participation in services, support for LGBT rights and flexibility over Kashrut dietary laws. It is one of four Progressive, the others being Beit Emanuel Progressive Synagogue on Oxford Road, Temple Bet David in Sandton and Beit Luria (opened in 2019) in Randburg. The Progressive movement in South Africa and the overall South African Jewish population reached its high point in the 1970s with an estimated Jewish population of 120,000 of whom 11,000 identified with the Progressive movement. As of 2019, the Jewish population was estimated at 70,000 with around 6,000 Progressive Jews.

== History ==
Temple Israel was built in 1936 on the corner of Claim and Paul Nel Streets when the Jewish population of Hillbrow amounted to around 800. The interior maintains much of the original features such as wood panelling and parquet floors. The bimah has twin gold columns and menorah shapes going up the wall. There is also an egalitarian three-sided gallery that runs around the main seating area.

The idea to build the synagogue was sparked by a visit in 1929 of Prof. Abraham Zvi Idelsohn (1882-1938) who was visiting family in Johannesburg at the time. He held forth on Jewish music and the origins of Progressive Judaism, as Reform was also called. Idelsohn encouraged his brother Jerry to found a Reform group in the Gold City. After beginning to hold services in private homes in 1930, Jerry founded the South African Jewish Religious Union for Liberal Judaism (later the South African Union for Progressive Judaism). Jerry made contact with Moses Cyrus Weiler, at the time a student of the elder Idelsohn's at the Hebrew Union College-Jewish Institute of Religion. After he was ordained in August 1933, Rabbi Weiler came to Johannesburg to found a Reform congregation. His first service was held in the Freemason's Hall at Clarendon Place at the edge of Hillbrow.

After Weiler's arrival, a plot was purchased on Empire Road, Parktown and Weiler hired Herman Kallenbach to build a grand synagogue with lush gardens and where Weiler would serve as rabbi. However, just as building work was set to commence, a neighbourhood petition circulated against plans for a synagogue in a residential area. Eventually a decision was made to sell the plot and buy a smaller 0.30 ha (.75-acre) plot on Paul Nel Street in Hillbrow, where there were already synagogues such as the Great Synagogue and Poswohl Synagogue. Kallenbach used the same Art Deco design that he and his partners A.M. Kennedy and A.S. Furner had prepared for the Parktown site, but scaled it down according to the smaller plot size. Kallenbach also choose the site for the Great Synagogue on Wolmarans Street.

Weiler fostered what has been referred to as ‘Weilerism’, a specific form of Reform Judaism specific to a South African context. This was "rather more cautious than the principles of his American and British counterparts" however, still quite radical by South African standards. Weiler was keen to replicate a trend in American Reform Judaism, where the Bar Mitzvah at age 13 was replaced with Confirmation at age 16, requiring students to study for an exam and then lead a service. However, in South Africa there was instant backlash to the Christian-sounding name of Confirmation and because of the ingrained rite of passage that a Bar Mitzvah held for Jewish boys and men. Weiler quickly reintroduced the Bar Mitzah and any dedicated students that were committed to Conformation did so under the guise of Hebrew names such as Bnei Emunah. The innovations in the services included the use of English alongside Hebrew, gender equality on synagogue committees and the eventual introduction of Bat Mitzvah ceremonies. The Hazzan was also replaced by professional mixed choirs. Weiler also made it compulsory for men to wear a kippah and tallit in services, likewise he expected women to cover their heads too. Kosher dietary laws (Kashrut) were not mandatory but were encouraged. Weiler also introduced a strong emphasis on Zionism, Temple Israel started the first local services where the Hebrew had Israeli-style Sephardic pronunciation rather than Ashkenazic. Hatikvah, the national anthem of the State of Israel was also sung alongside God Save the King. He also attempted to advance a free membership model whereby the synagogue would be entirely funded by the city's wealthiest Jewish individuals such as mining magnates. The model was not feasible, an unsuccessful proposal was made to Ernest Oppenheimer, who was uninterested in Judaism.

On 6 August 1983 a limpet mine exploded outside the synagogue, four hours before State President Marais Viljoen and Rabbi Weiler were scheduled to attend a ceremony marking Temple Israel's 50th anniversary. There were no injuries or deaths, but the blast destroyed walls, ripped out windows and seats and turned cupboards and furniture upside down. Nonetheless, the celebration went ahead with Viljoen and Weiler in attendance. Mahommed Iqbal Shaik of the Dolphin Unit of Umkhonto we Sizwe (MK) later assumed responsibility during the Truth and Reconciliation Commission hearings and he was granted amnesty.

Jews began emigrating from South Africa in the 1970s and by the 1990s most of the Jewish population of Hillbrow had migrated to the northern suburbs or emigrated. In 1994, the SAUPJ hired a rabbi from London to lead the congregation. The rabbi felt that with the exodus of Jewish residents and changes in the neighbourhood, a synagogue in the location was no longer viable. He recommended that the synagogue be closed and the property sold.

Reeva Forman, a businesswoman in the cosmetics industry fought to keep the synagogue open. Forman grew up in an Orthodox Jewish congregation in Doornfontein, but nevertheless felt compelled to support Temple Israel. At the time the congregation attracted around sixty attendees to its Shabbat services. The rabbi returned to London and Forman began to manage the synagogue. She appointed David Bilchitz, a legal scholar, to be the lay rabbi for the congregation.

At Temple Israel's 80th anniversary celebration in 2016, a permanent exhibition was launched delving into the evolution of the Reformed Movement in South Africa and the history of the synagogue, the Heritage Centre. In 2017, only 50 attended regularly, although 300 attended on High Holy Days.

== Activities ==
The congregation consists primarily of old, frail, lonely and poor people from Hillbrow, Berea, Yeoville, and Parktown. These Jews still regard it as their spiritual home. The synagogue is leased to a Christian church for Sunday services, at a nominal fee.

Temple Israel's site houses a school that enrolls Jews and non-Jewish students. The shul has established an outreach program, the M.C. Weiler Primary School, in Alexandra township. The women of Temple Israel began such programs in 1944, believing that Jews must help fellow both believers and their other neighbors in need.

Businesswoman Reeva Forman got involved with Temple Israel in the early 1990s when she heard the congregation was going to sell the synagogue. The purchase vote failed by one. She has served as chairwoman of Temple Israel since 1994.

== See also ==
- History of the Jews in South Africa
- List of synagogues in South Africa
