= Dana Evan Kaplan =

American Reform rabbi (born 1960)

- Born: October 29, 1960 (age 65); Manhattan, New York, U.S.
- Occupations: Rabbi, Author, Scholar

Academic work
- Main interests: Reform Judaism, American Judaism
- Notable works: A Life of Meaning: Embracing Reform Judaism's Sacred Path

Dana Evan Kaplan (born October 29, 1960) is a Reform rabbi known for his writings on Reform Judaism, in particular, and American Judaism, generally. He has also written on other subjects, including American Jewish history and Jews in various diaspora communities. Kaplan has been the rabbi of Temple Beth Shalom of the West Valley in Sun City, Arizona, since June 2019.

Since becoming a pulpit rabbi in the Phoenix suburb, Kaplan has worked closely with Cantor Baruch Koritan and educator Andre Ivory to build a multi-generational Reform congregation serving the West Valley. This area grown rapidly in recent years. Kaplan has focused on reaching Jews in the region who are not affiliated with a congregation, as well as non-Jews interested in learning about Jewish religious teachings for the first time.

== Early life ==
Kaplan was born and grew up in Manhattan. As a child, his parents sent him to Ramaz School, a Jewish day school on the Upper East Side. Rabbi Edward Klein of the Stephen Wise Free Synagogue had officiated at the marriage of Kaplan's parents in 1958.

When his family moved farther uptown, they joined Rodeph Sholom on West 83rd Street. He studied at Friends Seminary until the age of fourteen (when his family moved again; this time to Waterbury, Connecticut).

Kaplan attended Chase Collegiate School, where his aunt, Ruth Moskowitz, encouraged his love of writing. He credits her with stimulating his interest during his high school years in many of the issues that would later drive his academic and spiritual pursuits.

Kaplan graduated magna cum laude from Yeshiva University; received rabbinical ordination from Hebrew Union College-Jewish Institute of Religion (HUC-JIR) in Jerusalem in 1994; and obtained a PhD in history from Tel Aviv University in 1997.

== Rabbinic education ==
All rabbinical students who attend HUC-JIR are required to study at its Jerusalem campus for one year; usually during their first year of schooling. Kaplan, however, was one of the few American students to complete their entire education at the Jerusalem campus through the Israel Rabbinical Program. This program is taught entirely in Hebrew and primarily caters to Israeli students from the local area.

As part of his rabbinical studies, Kaplan served as student rabbi in a number of Israeli Progressive congregations in the Tel Aviv suburbs. He officiated at Shabbat services and delivered sermons (all entirely in Hebrew). As a result of his experiences, Kaplan gained insight into the challenges Reform Judaism faces in Israel. He was inspired by Rabbi Mickey Boyden, who was rabbi at the synagogue in Ra'anana where Kaplan was a student rabbi in 1993. At that time, the congregation was struggling to get equal funding for a synagogue it hoped to construct. These difficulties were due in large part to the ‘status quo’, which did and does not treat Reform and Conservative Judaism as legitimate forms of Judaism from a political standpoint and adversely affects the groups' broader recognition, acceptance, and funding access. In 2007, Boyden was asked by the city of Hod Hasharon to recite the prayer for fallen soldiers and victims of terror during the annual memorial ceremony (Yom HaZikaron), in part because his son Jonathan was killed in battle in Lebanon almost 15 years earlier. When Orthodox Jews in the region threatened to disrupt the ceremony, the entire event was eventually cancelled.

During his time as a student, Kaplan also served as a rabbinic intern at the Israel Religious Action Center (IRAC) in Jerusalem. One of the goals of this organization is to work for equal status for Reform and Conservative congregations in terms of Israeli law. Kaplan focused on issues of religious pluralism in the State of Israel under the direct supervision of Rabbi Uri Regev, the director of the center at that time. Regev also taught a course at HUC-JIR on the history of Reform Judaism, which had a huge impact on Kaplan and was highly influential in the direction of his work.

It was his rabbinic education in Israel that helped Kaplan realize that at some point he wanted to work outside of Israel as well. In 1991, Kaplan was hired to a High Holy Day pulpit at Temple Jacob, in Hancock, Michigan. He was the resident student rabbi for about 12 days, covering the Jewish Holidays of Rosh Hashanah and Yom Kippur. At its peak in 1910, the congregation at Temple Jacob had about 100 Jewish families, due to the many jobs created by the copper boom in the area. Even before World War I, however, the demand for copper was declining and many people began to move away in search of employment. By the time Kaplan arrived, there were only about 30 Jewish families who were members at the temple. Many of the members were associated with Michigan Technological University, including the temple president Harley L. Sachs, who was a professor of technical writing and a published novelist.

The following year, Kaplan was offered a student pulpit at Temple Shalom in Brisbane, Australia, for a four-month period between June and October 1992. The rabbinic visit was deemed successful and efforts were undertaken to bring Kaplan back the following year, in conjunction with Temple Shalom in Surfers Paradise about an hour southeast of Brisbane (identical names notwithstanding, the temples were not affiliated). Under the supervision of Rabbi John Simon Levi of Melbourne, Kaplan spent the next year going back and forth between the two temples, alternating between serving one location for a week then traveling to the other temple for the next week.

== Pulpits / rabbinate work ==
=== South Africa ===
Immediately after graduating from HUC-JIR, Kaplan became rabbi at Temple Israel (Cape Town Progressive Jewish Congregation) in the Atlantic Seaboard suburb of Green Point in Cape Town in South Africa. He interviewed for the position in January 1994 and took up his role in July of that same year, just three months after the democratic elections of April 26–29, which were the first in which South African citizens of all races were allowed to participate.

Against such a historic backdrop, Kaplan advocated for redefining Jewish doctrine and behavior in terms of modern thought so that Judaism could become a relevant mode of belief for South Africans in the post-apartheid era. Kaplan argued that South African Jews need to grapple with the real social, economic, and political issues facing their country, and then develop a meaningful spiritual response to them. He wrote, “We are privileged to live in an extraordinary time, one in which we have lived to see a peaceful transition to a democratically-elected government.” Kaplan contended that the covenant between God and humankind should be an ongoing interaction in which emotions are at its core. Unfortunately, he wrote, much of organized religion emphasized a rigid formality that increased feelings of guilt rather than encouraging opportunity for personal transformation. “For South African Judaism to thrive we need to take a really hard look at our beliefs and practices with an eye on our commitment to personal freedom. We need to encourage diverse religious expression in response to an understanding of the complexities of our times. We need to accept that religiosity is a process, not a fossilized, codified monolith. We need to allow for interpretation, while rejecting rigid and lifeless legality.”

Kaplan reported that the South African Jewish community swung between feelings of jubilation that the transition to majority democratic rule had been achieved so peacefully and fear that the new society might not have a place for them. He noted that they were also concerned about the potential for a dramatic increase in crime and violence. Kaplan pressed for a much more extensive public endorsement of prophetic Judaism. “Only if Judaism can be presented as a religion with a strong theme of social justice can Jews retain their prominent role in society as critics and commentators.”

As rabbi, Kaplan invited a number of high-profile speakers to events that were hosted by the temple and open to the public. The most prominent of these individuals was Archbishop Desmond Tutu, who was about to begin his duties as co-chairman of the South African Truth and Reconciliation Commission. Tutu cited biblical sources to highlight the obligation to seek out justice and to fight against injustice. The Archbishop remarked that if he and his fellow Anglicans took the ethical message of scriptures seriously and applied it to the struggle against apartheid, the “real fault” lies with the Jews for having given such morally inspiring sentiments to the world.

Kaplan wrote a number of articles during his time in South Africa in which he argued that the process of reconciliation and healing that the country was then undertaking could be greatly bolstered by the wisdom from Jewish teachings. In an article in The Reconstructionist, he described the exercise of healing emotional wounds using the story of Joseph and his estranged brothers. Kaplan compared the conciliatory attitude of Joseph towards his brothers with that of Nelson Mandela towards the leaders of the apartheid system. He quoted from Archbishop Tutu, who explained that “without forgiveness there is no future”. Kaplan wrote that “[t]he South African experience should fill every Jewish heart with the hope that people of all backgrounds can work together to overcome bigotry and political repression and to make a better tomorrow for all of the people of South Africa. If reconciliation and healing can be accomplished in one country, perhaps it can be accomplished all over the world.

=== Georgia ===
Kaplan came to Temple B’nai Israel in Albany, Georgia in 2001. The congregation was a historic community founded in 1854. Kaplan took over for Rabbi Elijah Palnick, who had come to Albany from a temple in Little Rock, Arkansas. The congregation had just moved into a new synagogue building on Gillionville Road, designed by architect and member David Maschke.

During his time in Albany, Kaplan was active in interfaith dialogue and was the originator of the Interfaith Forum. Kaplan told WALB news, “In the aftermath of 9/11, I think it's critical for all Americans of different religions of backgrounds and faiths and all different types of people to dialogue with one another." Speaking about an interfaith program forum hosted by the temple on the topic of Judaism for Christians, Living Hope Fellowship Pastor Jay Ridenhower said "This is a good opportunity for people who don't know a lot about the Christian faith or the Jewish faith."

In 2010, Kaplan became a spokesperson for Judaism in southwest Georgia. When explosive devices were sent to two synagogues in the Midwest, he appeared on television to condemn this attempted act of terrorism. "This is an attempt from very far outside Albany to strike fear in the hearts of all Jews because it's not just these two synagogues in Chicago. We are saddened by the attempt to intimidate and threaten us."

=== Jamaica ===
In 2011, Kaplan took the position of rabbi at The United Congregation of Israelites (Shaare Shalom Synagogue) in Kingston, Jamaica. As their first rabbi in 33 years, Kaplan undertook an ambitious campaign to revitalize a stagnant congregation that had long been divided by differences in religious perspective, among other reasons. Synagogue Vice President Stephen Henriques told the Times of Israel, “The need for a rabbi was really to pull the congregation together and increase the knowledge and awareness of Judaism in the community after being without this level of leadership for so many years.”

Kaplan wanted to raise the profile of the synagogue among Jamaicans by organizing events that would engage the public, including a Jewish reggae concert and speeches by prominent non-Jewish public figures. For the commemoration of Yom HaShoah (Holocaust Remembrance Day), he invited German Ambassador Josep Beck to address the congregation on how contemporary Germany has grappled with the legacy of the Holocaust and what we can learn from the Nazi campaign of persecution and mass murder. He also wrote articles for the Jamaican newspapers and was interviewed on radio and television. In an article for The Gleaner, he wrote about the meaning that the Jewish holiday of Passover might have for Jamaicans of all religions. “The central meaning of Passover is that no matter how dire the circumstances we can retain hope. That hope can translate under the appropriate circumstances to concrete plans, and those plans can lead us out of Egypt. If we work together, we can bring about redemption, however we conceive of that term. The prophecy of Isaiah 11:6, ‘the lion will lie down with the lamb,’ can be fulfilled, if not literally, then metaphorically.”

He focused heavily on developing new liturgical forms intended specifically for the Jamaican Jewish community. At the time, the congregation was using a prayer book which had been prepared by lay leader Ernest Henriques de Souza, which was an amalgamation of the British edition of the Spanish and Portuguese Orthodox prayer book and The Union Prayer Book of the American Reform movement. While Kaplan had hoped to create a new, distinctly Jamaican prayer book, some of his original English prayers were utilized extensively. His best-known prayer - one for the welfare of the country - references the Bob Marley song “One Love” and was reprinted in a number of Jamaican textbooks on religion in the Caribbean.

Adonai, may all the people of our beautiful island nation live happily and prosper. May we be appreciative for what we have and may we willingly share it with those who are in need. Help us to communicate with one another and to appreciate each other's strengths as well as weaknesses. Teach us to respect the many ways that we may serve You in a country with so many religious faiths and traditions. May the people of our country be safe from strife and affliction and may we be healthy and vigorous in both body and spirit. We join together in one love, one heart, and let us say amen

Kaplan found the Jamaican people to be highly interested in religious experience generally and Jewish spirituality specifically. As he wrote in the Washington Post, “I have never before been in a country where so many people express an admiration for Jews and Judaism and want to draw closer to Jewish spiritual wisdom. We are truly fortunate that there is so much interest in our religion.”

Kaplan felt there was tremendous potential to revitalize the community in part by encouraging the conversion of highly motivated Jamaicans, many of whom had Jewish ancestry. Kaplan pioneered several innovative programs designed to bring Jewish spirituality and Jewish wisdom to the broader Jamaican population, and organized an extensive conversion program. He authored a document on conversion titled “We Endorse the Attitude of ‘Joy and Encouragement’”, based on the principle that “the Jewish community of Jamaica welcomes those who have chosen to become Jewish and cast their lot with the Jewish people. We welcome all sincere converts regardless of their former religious faith(s).”

Kaplan felt it was important to preserve and grow diaspora Jewish communities. As he wrote in the Jewish Press, “Every Jewish community wants to survive and indeed thrive, but there is a particular importance to the preservation and development of the world’s small, history-rich Jewish communities.” Kaplan asserted that so much of the Jewish history of the last 2,000 years was created in diaspora Jewish communities throughout the world, and that during the twentieth century many of these communities had been destroyed or had experienced a long period of decline. What had been a population which was spread out among almost every country in the world had evolved into a situation where Jews were concentrated primarily in a handful of countries. Kaplan expressed the hope that the Jamaican Jewish community could serve as an example of a counter-trend, preserving a distinctive Jewish culture in its small corner of the globe.

=== Alabama ===
After leaving Jamaica, Kaplan trained through the Interim Ministry Network to work as an interim clergy leader - someone who provides transitional leadership during a period of pastoral vacancy. He had the opportunity to utilize these skills in 2015 when he became interim rabbi of the oldest Jewish congregation in the State of Alabama, Springhill Avenue Temple (Congregation Sha’arai Shomayim), located in Mobile, Alabama.

Kaplan was supportive of Mobile Mayor Sandy Stimpson's efforts to set up an innovation team to fight urban blight. This effort was greatly aided by the city's receipt of a grant from the Bloomberg Philanthropies Organization. In the proposal for the grant, city leadership identified areas with high vacancy rates, which historically had enticed drug dealers and criminals to gravitate to the neglected and abandoned houses. The focus of the efforts were on two neighborhoods - Texas Hills and The Bottom - the latter of which is located only half a mile from downtown Mobile. Kaplan connected this effort to the kabbalistic idea of Tikkun Olam, a Hebrew phrase meaning 'repair of the world'.

Kaplan also advocated for greater recognition of Reform Judaism in Israel, arguing that this might not only have a positive impact on the State of Israel but also on Judaism in the United States. In the aftermath of the breakdown of the agreement to create an egalitarian prayer space at the Western Wall, he wrote in AL.com that “[t]he State of Israel recognizes only Orthodox Judaism, and only certain Orthodox leaders at that, as authoritative representatives of the Jewish religion. Only this self-selected group has the authority to perform civilly recognized weddings, for example.” He urged that “[i]f the Israeli Progressive movement could strengthen and acquire full civil and political status in Israel, this might have a tremendous positive impact on American Reform Judaism.”

Although based in Mobile, Kaplan cultivated satellite groups which focused on social engagement, study, and prayer. These monthly meetings took place to the east, across Mobile Bay in Eastern Shore, and to the west in neighboring Mississippi.

=== Arizona ===
Kaplan became full-time rabbi at Temple Beth Shalom of the West Valley in Sun City, Arizona, in 2019. Temple President Marvin Berris suggested that Kaplan arrive a few weeks before his official starting date of July 1 to work with retiring rabbi Sheldon Moss to make the transition as seamless as possible. “[Rabbi Sheldon Moss] and I have been doing our sermons together, so we’ve been having a dialogue together and that’s been a lot of fun,” Kaplan told the Arizona Jewish News. “It’s been a great opportunity to have a gradual entry and to see what and how the previous rabbi has been doing it. When you have a transition like this, it’s important to have as much stability and continuity as possible. We want to be warm, welcoming and spiritually meaningful and we’ll be continuing to reach out to everyone we can to serve them.”

Shortly after his arrival in Arizona, Kaplan was interviewed for an article on how Phoenix's rabbis were preparing their High Holy Day sermons. He emphasized that “preparing a sermon for the High Holidays is really a group effort", and noted that he and the temple's cantor, Baruch Koritan, "are working together with other members of the clergy to create meaningful sermons that connect with the people sitting in the pews.” The newspaper quoted him as saying, “It’s not so much a question of conveying information but rather connecting emotionally. How can I inspire them on these holidays? We have a very enthusiastic community and we feel like we are all one big family. The congregation is growing, which is great, and we have to work hard to make sure that those who are new are fully integrated into the community.”

One of Kaplan's planned themes for his sermons was how Judaism can help everyone live richer and deeper lives. He hoped to have a religiously meaningful service that flows rather than drags. Temple Beth Shalom is a spiritual home for all ages, but its community of older congregants is especially vibrant. Kaplan said that some of the older members are struggling with physical ailments. “My challenge is to figure out the best way to convey a hopeful religious message without implying that God is going to make everything all better in all cases.” He added, “The most important thing is to inspire and uplift.”

== Books ==
=== Contemporary Debates in American Reform Judaism: Conflicting Visions ===
Kaplan's first book, Contemporary Debates in American Reform Judaism: Conflicting Visions, was a collection of articles on Reform Judaism published by Routledge in 2001. The foreword was written by the prominent historian of American Religion, Martin E. Marty, who suggests that the essays in the book are a set of arguments that hopefully could inspire a set of conversations. Marty explains that arguments begin with two rhetoricians in possession of their own answers - truths that directly conflict with those of an opposing party - and each has set out to defend them. By the end of the debate, one party has convinced, converted, defeated, or exiled the other party. In contrast, conversations begin with the rhetorician posing questions, pursuing truths towards ends uncertain, through means that are not predetermined. Marty contends that vital societies need both argument and conversation. He points out that many of the former that are made in the essays of the book are very blunt. “There are in the pages to follow some rather bitter, often profound self-examinations as authors probe their own commitment and the records of the partisan interests they represent. Similarly, there are some critical assaults on others, attacks based on diverse interpretations of the history of Reform Judaism, accompanied by some often drastic suggestions about the future of the movement. This bystander found his pulse racing at times; he could only picture what will be going on in the minds of those for whom the future of Reform Judaism is of more than passing importance.”

In the afterword, Rabbi W. Gunther Plaut seems to agree, writing that a common streak lies in the issue-oriented nature of the articles in the book. Many of the articles “invite discussion because they affirm one thing and criticize another, with the emphasis clearly on the latter.” In fact, Plaut comments tongue-in-cheek that the book could be subtitled “A Critique of Reform Judaism by Reform Jews and Some Others.” Plaut notes that this approach will not be a surprise to members of the Reform movement “who consider self-criticism a quintessential element of Reform.” He concludes that “we change because we feel that our religious striving is more likely to be fulfilled if we admit that we have fallen short of our goal. By nature, Reform is always on the way.”

=== Platforms and Prayer Books: Theological and Liturgical Perspectives on Reform Judaism ===
On May 26, 1999, the Central Conference of American Rabbis (CCAR) met at the historic Rodef Shalom Temple in Pittsburgh, Pennsylvania, and voted to adopt the new platform called the Statement of Principles for Reform Judaism. Kaplan's next book, Platforms and Prayer Books: Theological and Liturgical Perspectives on Reform Judaism, was edited in the lively aftermath of the passing of this new Pittsburg Platform.

Kaplan writes that “while many people applauded the tone and substance of the proposed platform, others were distressed by what they felt was an abrogation of the historical positions of the Reform Movement.” He explains that, since the Age of Enlightenment, forward-thinking Jews have sought to understand Judaism as a modern religion, in an intellectual context equivalent to that of Christianity. This inevitably shifted the focus of attention away from the ritual commandments to a concern with the universal foundations of the faith. Much of Platforms and Prayer Books focuses on how Reform Jewish belief has changed in light of the acceptance of the new platform.

Kaplan acknowledges that there is an inherent difficulty reconciling theory with practice in a liberal religious framework. The book was influenced by a number of sociological studies which suggested that Reform Jews were expressing a greater openness to tradition while at the same time insisting on complete individual religious autonomy. In addition, these same studies indicated that the boundaries of Jewish identity were becoming much more permeable, in large part due to the massive increase in interfaith marriages. At the time, there had been a number of efforts to not only analyze how Reform synagogues function but to develop strategies for transforming how congregational life manifested itself.

The other topic in the book's title - prayer books - similarly reflected contemporary concerns. The Reform movement had used the Union Prayer Book from 1895 to 1975, when The Gates of Prayer was adopted as the Reform movement's new standard prayer book. When Platforms and Prayer Books went to press, a new Reform prayer book was in the process of being developed. This updated prayer book would eventually be published in 2007 as Mishkan T’filah: A Reform Siddur. Kaplan's book discusses various aspects of prayer and prayer books, including the challenge of creating a single prayer book for the entire Reform movement - a diverse collection of congregations with varying approaches to both belief and practice. In his essay for the book, Rabbi Peter S. Knobel charted what he believed to be the likely future trends of Reform Jewish liturgy, while warning that there was both a danger of “being too cautious and creating a prayer book for the age that has passed” and at the same time a “danger of being too far ahead”.

While the title of the book references platforms and prayer books, which are both specific types of texts, Kaplan's underlying concern appears to be more with theology behind how those texts are understood. “The Reform theological enterprise is nothing short of an attempt to justify the continued existence of the Jewish community in America.” In reviewing the book, Rabbi Mordecai Finley argues that although the texts of Reform Judaism are the vehicles for transmitting its core beliefs, a successful religious movement needs to have the ability to transform its members into those who can read its texts in a culture-specific fashion. Finley writes that this book “belongs on the shelf of every person and institution concerned with Reform Judaism.”

=== American Reform Judaism: An Introduction ===
Kaplan first became known to the broader public following the 2003 publication of his book American Reform Judaism: An Introduction. Kaplan, influenced by Rodney Stark and other sociologists of religion who apply the Rational Choice Theory to the study of American religious denominationalism, argued that the American Reform Movement needed to raise their demands in order to increase the production of "collective religious commodities," the "religious goods" essential for the continued vitality of the religious group. Kaplan insisted that the concept of religious autonomy, while admirable in theory, had produced a negative cycle of apathy and alienation in Reform temples throughout the United States.

In the foreword for the book, Rabbi Arthur Hertzberg writes that he initially resisted writing the foreword because he felt that Kaplan was an optimist about the future of American Judaism. "I was eventually persuaded that I should [write it] by my respect for the author's clearheaded understanding of the contemporary situation of Reform Judaism. He knows all the nuances of the problems that liberal Jewish religion must face and he understands the positions of all the major participants in the various debates." What concerned Hertzberg was that "it is evident that he [Kaplan] is comfortable and even takes pride in the openness and experimentation within the ranks of the Reformed. The good that this affords in freedom of behavior far outweighs, so Kaplan believes, the threats of doubt and evaporation that are unchecked by any religious authority." Hertzberg counters by saying, "I am on the other side of this debate. I know that the bulk of American Jews are not waiting for rabbinic permission to do whatever they want, but this contemporary situation saddens me. It is the task and responsibility of rabbi to defend and to fight for restrictions on our individual conduct." Despite his philosophical difference with Kaplan, Hertzberg praises the book. “Dana Evan Kaplan, the scholar, has done an admirable and even exemplary job of leading the reader through this piece of uncharted territory of contemporary religious history of American Jews.”

American Reform Judaism was featured as the subject of a panel discussion in Judaism: A Quarterly Journal of Jewish Life and Thought, with responses from leaders of the various American Jewish denominations. It was called "a significant Jewish book" by Reform Judaism magazine in Winter 2003.

=== Cambridge Companion to American Judaism ===
In 2005, Kaplan followed up American Reform Judaism: An Introduction by editing Cambridge Companion to American Judaism, a comprehensive scholarly survey that treats Judaism as an American religion rather than treating Jewish myths as an ethnicity. Twenty-six leading scholars from the fields of religious studies, American history and literature, philosophy, art history, sociology, and musicology, contributed essays to this collection. Mirroring the general structure of the Cambridge Companions series, Cambridge Companion to American Judaism begins with a historical overview of Judaism in America, dividing it into the periods 1654–1880, 1880–1945, and 1945-present (the third of which was written by Kaplan himself). The second part of the book, called Themes and Concepts, included sections titled "Religious Culture and Institutional Practice", "Identity and Community", "Living in America", "Jewish Art in America", and "The Future of American Judaism". While influenced by Christian patterns of religious life, American Jews have understood the idea of religious identification quite differently. Thus, a secondary goal of the volume was to help both Jewish and non-Jewish readers better understand the more abstract meaning of religion in a Jewish context. In an afterword, American Jewish historian Jonathan D. Sarna writes that “as the appearance of this Cambridge Companion aptly demonstrates, the study of American Judaism has, at long last, come into its own.”

=== Contemporary American Judaism: Transformation and Renewal ===
His 2009 book, Contemporary American Judaism: Transformation and Renewal, has been alternately praised for taking new approaches to Jewish religiosity seriously and condemned for what some have seen as an excessively non-judgmental approach to trivial irrelevancies. Kaplan explains that changing social trends have completely transformed the nature of non-Orthodox Judaism in America. The American Jewish religious denominations are no longer as important as they had been in the thirty or thirty-five year period following World War II and are increasingly irrelevant in a time of post-denominationalism. He credits the "re-engagement with spirituality" as providing the motivation for new forms of Jewish life, which are described in the last three chapters of the book: "Radical Responses to the Suburban Experience," "The Popularization of Jewish Mystical Outreach," and "Herculean Efforts at Synagogue Renewal." Rabbi Lance Sussman, writing in The Jewish Review of Books, praised the final three chapters. "Here, Kaplan is clearly breaking new ground and writing a new narrative for twenty-first century American Judaism."

In the Afterword, Rabbi Zalman Schachter-Shalomi writes that “the book is a masterful and sympathetic portrayal of American Judaism in the early years of the twenty-first century. Kaplan understands the difference between what is important and what is not and is able to paint a detailed picture of the Judaism of the future without apologetics but with a lot of color. Kaplan touches on the right points in just the right way. He draws on his exhaustive knowledge as both a scholar and a pulpit rabbi. One of the things I liked most was that Kaplan stresses that American [emphasis his] Judaism is not just Judaism in the United States but rather is Judaism that has been deeply influenced by America.”

=== The New Reform Judaism: Challenges and Reflections ===
In 2013, Kaplan wrote The New Reform Judaism: Challenges and Reflections, published by the University of Nebraska Press as a Jewish Publication Society book, with a foreword by Rabbi Eric H. Yoffie and an afterword by Rabbi Rick Jacobs. In it, Kaplan describes how the American Reform movement faces enormous challenges in the coming years. He posits that in order to remain vibrant and active, the movement will need to develop convincing justifications for maintaining the Jewish people as an ethno-religious group in an era where boundaries and borders of all kinds are fading if not disappearing entirely. In his view, this will necessitate creating a Judaism that will focus not so much on loyalty to community but on innovative practices to engage the individual in the search for existential meaning.

As in his earlier book on Reform Judaism, Kaplan contends that if the Reform movement wants to develop a vibrant religious culture, there is a need for a clearer theology. He points out that every religion has to have a way to explain what it believes and why, and that if too many religious viewpoints are allowed then the religious movement as a whole loses all focus. One of the problems with developing a clearer theology is the tremendous diversity of opinion within the Reform rabbinate and Reform congregations. In addition, there is no universally accepted methodology for determining how to consider or decide upon any theological perspective. One of the greatest challenges, Kaplan writes, is how to present Jewish religious belief in the absence of a consensus over what Reform Jews believe.

=== A Life of Meaning: Embracing Reform Judaism's Sacred Path ===
Kaplan had long dreamed of editing a major collection of contemporary articles on different aspects of Reform Judaism. He had often studied and referenced a number of earlier volumes of this type that had been published in previous generations, but nothing like them had been produced in several decades. The project took several years of soliciting articles and then organizing and compiling the vast volume of material that was received. When it was finally published in 2018, A Life of Meaning: Embracing Reform Judaism's Sacred Path included 56 articles written by 58 authors from a wide, diverse range of viewpoints, and speaks to virtually every important topic of relevance to religion today. Addressed to Reform Jews and those potentially interested in Reform Judaism, the collection continues to be used as one of the foundational texts for adult education courses dealing with Reform Judaism.

Concluding the Introduction for A Life of Meaning, Kaplan acknowledges the concern that religion can quickly become antiquated in a society that is changing so rapidly. “Our guiding principle needs to be that the Torah is not in the heavens, it is not beyond the sea, but like our contemporary challenges, it is right here, close to us. It is our covenantal responsibility to undertake the task of interpreting the Jewish religion in the light of who we are today.”

== Publications ==
=== Popular and academic writings ===
Kaplan has written numerous essays and articles for a diverse range of publications, spanning newspapers, magazines, journals, and academic periodicals.

Many outlets specifically cater to Jewish audiences, such as The Forward, Haaretz, Tablet, The Jerusalem Post, Jewish Spectator, Moment, Midstream, The Times of Israel, American Jewish Archives Journal, Jewish Telegraphic Agency, Shofar: An Interdisciplinary Journal of Jewish Studies, Judaism: A Quarterly Journal of Jewish Life and Thought, Journal of Jewish Education, Australian Journal of Jewish Studies, European Judaism: A Journal for the New Europe, CCAR Journal, My Jewish Learning, Tradition: A Journal of Orthodox Jewish Thought, The Reconstructionist, Conservative Judaism, and The Journal of Progressive Judaism, to name a few.

Some have a focus on faith or religion in general, such as Journal of Beliefs and Values, Scottish Journal of Religious Studies (now called Culture and Religion), and Journal of Contemporary Religion.

Many are widely-read locally or around the globe, such as the Washington Post, HuffPost, AL.com (Alabama, United States), The Sunday Independent (South Africa), and the Jamaica Observer.

Kaplan has also written encyclopedic articles on various topics related to Judaism for volumes including Encyclopaedia Judaica, Worldmark Encyclopedia of Religious Practices, The Cambridge Dictionary of Judaism and Jewish Culture, The Encyclopedia of Religion in America, The Encyclopaedia of Judaism, The Companion to Judaism (Volume I), The Companion to Judaism: Readers’ Guide (Volume II), Milestone Documents of World Religions, American Religious History: Belief and Society Through Time, The Wiley-Blackwell Histories of Religion: The Wiley-Blackwell History of Jews and Judaism, and Jewish History, Religion, and Culture: A Cambridge Survey.

He has written reviews of books from his contemporaries, including Robert H. Mnookin’s The Jewish American Paradox: Embracing Choice in a Changing World, Steven R. Weisman’s, The Chosen Wars: How Judaism Became an American Religion, Jack Wertheimer’s The New American Judaism: How Jews Practice Their Religion Today, and Jews in the Center: Conservative Synagogues and their Members (Jack Wertheimer, Ed.). Kaplan contributed two essays - "Autonomy" and "South Africa" - to a collection titled The Reader’s Guide to Judaism: A Bibliographic Guide to English-Language Books and Essays on Judaism, which was nominated for a Jewish Book Award in 2000.

=== Conversion ===
Kaplan wrote his PhD dissertation at Tel Aviv University - titled “Conversion to Judaism in America: 1760-1897” - under the supervision of Professor Lloyd Gartner. One of the constants of Kaplan's career has been an interest in conversion to Judaism.

In his most recent book, A Life of Meaning: Embracing Reform Judaism's Sacred Path, he wrote an entire chapter entitled “Converting to Judaism”. He explains that “[m]any people have the impression that Judaism is not a religion you can convert into or, at the very least, that most Jews would not be receptive to a convert in their midst. This is not the case, certainly not in Reform Judaism. Many of our leaders and thinkers have spoken out strongly in favor of encouraging individuals to convert, even organizing campaigns to make our welcoming policy known. Those interested in embracing the Jewish religion should do so in the expectation that people will be warm and welcoming.”

Kaplan stressed that the ultimate goal of converting to Judaism is to build a close relationship with God as full members of the covenantal bond. “We believe that the covenant between the Jews and God is a relationship of loyalty and reciprocal love. It obligates us to live as God wants us to, something each of us must determine for ourselves”. He writes that “Judaism is the purest manifestation of ethical monotheism. It can bring enlightenment and help the individual build a close and loving relationship with God. It can provide mechanisms to become a better person and make a positive impact on the world. The Torah is a tree of life. We want to share its beauty and radiance with others, and we are commanded by God to do so.”

Kaplan defines ‘conversion’ as “a formal process that a non-Jewish person undertakes in order to embrace the Jewish religion and become part of the Jewish community.” It is “the result of an informed decision to accept the beliefs of Judaism and adopt the associated practices”.

=== Cuba ===
Kaplan began writing about the Jewish community in Communist Cuba in 2000 with the publication of “A Jewish Renaissance in Castro’s Cuba,” for Judaism journal. The article was included in the feature “From All Their Habitations” (a title pulled from the biblical verse found in Ezekiel 37:23), a selection of reports highlighting Jewish religious, intellectual, and communal life from various parts of the world.

Kaplan studied the Fidel Castro revolution and the subsequent mass Jewish immigration from the country in the 1960s. He documented the religious renaissance of the small percentage of Cuban Jews who remained in the country that began in the 1990s. He also wrote about the Elian Gonzalez custody and immigration incident from a Jewish communal perspective, which was translated into Spanish and reprinted widely in both languages.

In 2004, Kaplan wrote a cover story titled “Fidel and the Jews” for Moment magazine.

== Personal life ==
Kaplan is a scuba diver with dives in Mexico, South Africa, Indonesia, Honduras, and many other countries. He has trekked in Nepal, where he circled the Annapurna mountain range.

== See also ==
- List of rabbis
