= South African Zionist Federation =

- Formation: 1898
- Location: Johannesburg, South Africa
- Website: www.sazionfed.co.za

The South African Zionist Federation (SAZF) is a Zionist umbrella organisation in South Africa, founded in 1898 and based in Johannesburg. It coordinates Zionist activities in the country and works with Jewish communal organisations and Zionist youth movements. Its activities include advocacy for Israel, assistance with migration to Israel, Hebrew-language instruction, education, and outreach.

During the 1948 Arab–Israeli War, the SAZF helped organise more than 800 South African volunteers to fight for Israel. It subsequently established an office in Israel to assist South African Jewish immigrants; this organisation later became Telfed.

== History ==
=== Formation and early years ===
The South African Zionist Federation (SAZF) was founded in 1898, one year after the first Zionist Congress in Basel, Switzerland and predates the establishment of the State of Israel by 60 years. Its mission is to "build strong support and love for the Land and State of Israel" in South Africa. It advocates for Israel in South Africa and is concerned with all matters relating to Israel and its image in South Africa.

The Federation predates the SABJD, which Dan Jacobson explains: "It is a measure of the enthusiasm of South African Jewry for the Zionist cause that it had a single body uniting its various Zionist groups some years before a similar body [SABJD] devoted to local affairs could be formed."

Historically, The SAZF has been one of two most important Jewish communal institutions in South Africa, along with the South African Jewish Board of Deputies (SABJD).

=== Mid-century and the State of Israel ===
During the 1948 Arab-Israel War, following the declaration of the independence of the State of Israel; the SAZF was instrumental in organising over 800 volunteers, known as machalnikim (overseas volunteers), to fight for Israel.

The SAZF established an Israel office to support the Jewish machalnikim and other migrants, known as olim, from South Africa. This organisation eventually became known as Telfed, its abbreviated telex name, and its services of supporting and guiding olim as they settle in Israel.

== Current structure and activities ==
=== Structure and affiliates ===
The SAZF acts as an umbrella organisation working with various partners, such as the Jewish National Fund, the South African Jewish Board of Deputies and the South African Jewish Board of Education as well as Zionist youth movements such as Bnei Akiva SA, Habonim SA, Netzer SA and Betar SA, to progress its mission responsible for coordinating all the Zionist activities throughout the country.

The SAZF is based in Johannesburg, with additional branches in Cape Town, Durban, and Port Elizabeth.

=== SAZF areas of focus ===
==== Israel advocacy ====
The SAZF "works proactively to reduce anti-Israel sentiment in South African political, religious and cultural communities.....through education, advocacy and lobbying".

===== Aliyah =====
Migrating to Israel, known as "making aliyah", is central to the work of the SAZF, facilitated through its affiliate, the Israel Centre. "Through the dedicated Aliyah Department, each prospective new immigrant, known as oleh, will receive advice and help in organising all necessary documentation, flights, access to Ulpan programmes, funding for first few months (klita) and an absorption plan."

===== Hebrew lessons =====
The SAZF provides Hebrew lessons at multiple levels of proficiency for those planning to make aliyah or simply wanting to learn Hebrew. Classes are held online for Beginners and Intermediate levels and in person for Advanced levels.

===== Education and training =====
As at 2026 the SAZF was providing the Forever Israel High School Education Programme for matric (final year of high school) students to learn how to combat antisemitism and antizionism rhetoric.

===== South African Friends of Israel (SAFI) =====
The SAFI was created to engage with other faith-based, cultural and ethnic groups in order to build grass roots support for Israel in South Africa. Multiple initiatives, such as "giving influential decision-makers a first-hand experience of Israel, it creates media content to combat propaganda and is committed to harnessing the creativity and innovation of Israel's tech sector to uplift South Africans from all walks of life."

===== Outreach =====
In addition to its South Friends of Israel (SAFI) initiative (covered above) the SAZF is a member of Partnership2Gether (P2G) and Project TEN. P2G "aims to connect Jews wherever they may be". It "unites 550 Jewish communities in the diaspora with 45 Israeli Partnership areas...... as well as one-on-one encounters". Project TEN is an international development programme that operates volunteer centres in parts of Africa, Central America and Israel.

Youth

The SAZF is affiliated with multiple South African Jewish youth organisations including Bnei Akiva, Habonim, Netzer, Betar, South African Union of Jewish Students and Diller Teen Fellowship.

== Modern advocacy ==
Aligned to its mission to "build strong support and love for the Land and State of Israel" in South Africa, the SAZF works proactively to reduce anti-Israel sentiment in South African political, religious and cultural communities.....through education, advocacy and lobbying" as stated above. It issues press releases, reports and opinions where it sees current examples of antisemitism and antizionism.
