= World Union for Progressive Judaism =

International Jewish organization

- Abbreviation: WUPJ
- Formation: 10 July 1926
- Founder: Claude Montefiore
- Founded at: London, UK
- Headquarters: Beit Shmuel, Eliyahu Shama 6, Jerusalem
- Members: ~1.8 million
- President: Rabbi Sergio Bergman
- Chair: Carole Sterling
- Affiliations: URJ, JRF etc.
- Budget: ~5,000,000$ (2014)

The World Union for Progressive Judaism (WUPJ) is the international umbrella organization for the various branches of Reform, Liberal and Progressive Judaism, as well as the separate Reconstructionist Judaism. The WUPJ states that it aims to create common ground between its constituents and to promote Progressive Judaism in places where individuals and groups are seeking authentic, yet modern ways of expressing themselves as Jews. It seeks to preserve Jewish integrity wherever Jews live, to encourage integration without assimilation, to deal with modernity while preserving the Jewish experience, and to strive for equal rights and social justice.

According to a census by the Union published in 2025, it has 1.8 million members and 1,250 congregations in 50 countries.

== History ==
The WUPJ was established in London in 1926 as the Union of all Progressive (also Liberal or Reform) movements. It moved its headquarters to New York in 1959, and to Jerusalem in 1973. In 1990, the Reconstructionists – who espouse a philosophy different from that of the former – joined the WUPJ under an observer status, being the first and only non-Reform member. The WUPJ has regional offices in London, Moscow, and New York City.

As of 2021 the President of the WUPJ was Rabbi Sergio Bergman, and the Chair was Carole Sterling.

According to a census by the Union published in 2025, it has 1.8 million members and 1,250 congregations in 50 countries.

Past presidents have included Claude Montefiore (1926–38), Rabbi Leo Baeck (1938–56), Lily Montagu (1955–59), and Rabbi Solomon Freehof (1959–64).

== Mission statement ==
- Establishment and support of synagogues and schools wherever there are Jews searching for meaningful access to modern Jewish life
- Recruitment, training and placement of rabbis, cantors and educators
- Publication and distribution of liturgical and educational materials in languages Jews speak
- Sponsorship of international programs for youth, education, leadership development, and all aspects of community building
- Bringing together like-minded Jews to derive strength from one another, blending ancient traditions with the changing world of today

== Beliefs ==
=== Marriage ===
Various Jewish organizations that are members of the Union have adopted resolutions supporting same-sex marriage in synagogues. In 1993 in Reconstructionist Judaism, in 2000 in the Union for Reform Judaism (Canada and the United States), in 2007 in the South African Union for Progressive Judaism, in 2011 in the Union for Progressive Judaism (Australia, New Zealand, and Asia), and in 2012 in Progressive Judaism (United Kingdom).

== Regional affiliates ==
=== North America ===
The Union for Reform Judaism (URJ), formerly the Union of American Hebrew Congregations, was founded in 1873. It is by far the largest member organization of the WUPJ, with a solid constituency of over 750,000 Jewish members (along with further 90,000 unconverted gentile spouses) and over a million non-members who identify with it in the U.S., and further 30,000 constituents in Canada. As of 2016, 1.5 million of the 1.9 million members of WUPJ are in the U.S. German immigrants and rabbis brought Reform to America, although a short-lived congregation that espoused a somewhat similar ideal existed in Charleston between 1824 and 1833. The Union of American Hebrew Congregations, URJ since 2003, was founded in 1873.

North America is also home to the Jewish Reconstructionist Federation, which has 97 affiliates, (only five of them are outside the continent, in Delft, Netherlands, Curaçao; Wiesbaden, Germany; Serrastretta, Italy; Ijuí, Brazil). The JRF joined as an observer in 1990. It is the only non-Reform organization in the WUPJ, the other members of which do uphold the basic tenets of ongoing revelation, personal God and the like. In 2013, it had some 65,000 constituents.

=== United Kingdom ===
Claude Montefiore, a major theologian, named his religious ideology "Liberal Judaism", founding the Jewish Religious Union, later renamed Liberal Judaism, as a platform in 1902. His movement was a founding member of the WUPJ in 1926. The Movement for Reform Judaism, established officially in 1942, joined the global organization in 1945.

In 2025, Liberal Judaism and the Movement for Reform Judaism voted to unite to become the Movement for Progressive Judaism.

=== Israel ===
A first congregation was formed at Jerusalem during 1958. The movement was incorporated in 1971. The Israeli surrounding encouraged a more conservative approach on behalf of the local branch. The prayer in vernacular, for example, was Hebrew anyway, and the populace was relatively more familiar with rabbinic sources. Patrilineal descent is not recognized by the IMPJ, as by many other smaller affiliates, which cannot antagonize the Israeli Orthodox religious establishment.

=== South Africa ===
The movement was established in 1931 with the encouragement of Abraham Zevi Idelsohn and Lily Montagu. South African Jewry is mostly nominally Orthodox, with those in Progressive streams accounting for around 10% of South African Jews currently residing in the country.

=== Australia, New Zealand, and Asia ===
The movement was established in the 1930s in Melbourne by Ada Phillips with the encouragement of Lily Montagu and Israel Mattuck. Australian Jewry is similar to its South African counterpart in that it is mostly nominally Orthodox. Around twenty percent of affiliated Jews in Australia belong to progressive congregations.

=== Europe ===
Reform Judaism began in Germany, led by Rabbi Abraham Geiger. It stagnated considerably after the 1840s. In 1898, German Liberal rabbis organized the Union of Liberal Rabbis in Germany under Heinemann Vogelstein. In 1908 the laity formed the Union for Liberal Judaism in Germany. At its height, it had some 10,000 members and half the rabbis in the country. The ULJ was a founding member of the World Union in 1926. After the destruction of the Holocaust, Germany's Jews, mostly refugees of foreign descent, largely favoured Orthodoxy. Liberal Judaism managed to gain inroads slowly, and first prayer groups appeared in 1995. The Union of Progressive Jews was founded in 1997.

The first new branch established by the WUPJ was in the Netherlands, in 1931, eventually coalescing into the Nederlands Verbond voor Progressief Jodendom.

The movement is growing in Spain. As of 2016 there are six congregations, while there was only one congregation a decade ago. In 2017 the Reform community there expects to have its first native-born rabbi since the Expulsion in 1492 once he completes his rabbinical training in London.

In Cyprus, Progressive Judaism is represented by Shirat HaYam - Liberal Jewish Community of Cyprus, founded in Limassol in 2025. The community is affiliated with the European Union for Progressive Judaism (EUPJ), the European regional branch of the World Union for Progressive Judaism (WUPJ), and holds egalitarian religious services, lifecycle ceremonies, educational programs and cultural events.

=== Latin America ===
The WUPJ opened a regional office in Buenos Aires in 1963 to "strengthen and build Jewish religious life" in South America.

Since the early 2000s, a Latin American affiliate has been evolving. Officially founded at the Leaders Regional Conference of Progressive Communities in Córdoba (Argentina), in December 2009, then WUPJ-Latin America renamed itself the Union for Reform Judaism - Latin America (UJR-AmLat, the acronym in Spanish and Portuguese) in 2019.

The main concern of the time in the early 2000s was the vulnerability of the Jewish communities of Argentina, which was going through a serious social, economic and political crisis. The embryo of the organization was conceived in 2002 in São Paulo, by activists from liberal communities of Brazil, who chose that city as the regional headquarters of the organization.

As of June 2020, UJR-AmLat has 26 affiliated communities, being one Rabbinical Institute, one Jewish School (both in Buenos Aires), two youth movements (affiliated to Netzer Olami) in São Paulo, and 22 synagogues in Brazil, Argentina, Chile, Ecuador, Peru, Costa Rica, and Guatemala.

=== Other ===
- European WUPJ providing regional support to congregations in Austria, Belgium, Czech Republic, Denmark, France, Hungary, Ireland, Italy, Luxembourg, Poland, Spain, Switzerland. Within the European region there are also subregional associations for Germany, Italy, Netherlands, and the UK.
- "WUPJ – Former Soviet Union" providing support for congregations in the Former Soviet Union.
- Union of Jewish Congregations of Latin America and the Caribbean supports congregations in Latin America and the Caribbean. Shai Pinto, the vice president and COO of the World Union for Progressive Judaism, noted in 2012 that Latin America represented the fastest growing region for the movement.

There are also, Arzenu – the international umbrella organization for progressive religious Zionist organizations, and Netzer Olami, the international youth wing of the progressive movement, jointly sponsored by Arzenu and the WUPJ.

== Rabbis, cantors and communal leaders ==
Rabbis, cantors, and communal leaders for the worldwide progressive movement are trained in one of eight rabbinic institutions: Leo Baeck College, Abraham Geiger College, Hebrew Union College, the Institute for Modern Jewish Studies in Moscow, the Iberoamerican Institute for Reform Rabbinical Education, the École Rabbinique de Paris, the Levisson Institute Amsterdam, and the Reconstructionist Rabbinical College.

While all eight train rabbis for the worldwide progressive movement, each has a different focus. Leo Baeck College, located in the United Kingdom, focuses on leadership for the UK Reform and UK Liberal. Abraham Geiger College focuses on providing leadership for communities in Germany, Central and Eastern Europe. Hebrew Union College, with campuses in the United States and Israel, trains rabbis and communal service leaders for work in North American Reform and Israeli Progressive congregations. It also provides a year-in-Israel program for students at the Leo Baeck College and Abraham Geiger Institute. The Moscow Institute trains leadership for the Russian-speaking communities, the École Rabbinique de Paris does so for the French-speaking communities, and the Levisson Institute for the Dutch-speaking communities. The Iberoamerican Institute focuses on Latin America and Spanish- and Portuguese-speaking communities, offering an online programme with weeklong, in-person seminars twice a year. The Reconstructionist Rabbinical College trains leadership for the associated Reconstructionist Movement.

== Netzer Olami ==
Netzer Olami is the worldwide youth movement of the World Union for Progressive Judaism (WUPJ) and is affiliated to Arzenu (the Zionist arm of the WUPJ). "Netzer" is an acronym in Hebrew for 'Reform Zionist Youth' (Noar Tsioni Reformi, נוער ציוני רפורמי), and Netzer Olami means 'Global Netzer'.

Today there are over 16,000 members active in the different sniffim (chapters) that are located in the following countries: Australia, Belarus, Brazil, Costa Rica, Germany Israel (Noar Telem), the Netherlands, North America (NFTY), Panama, Russia, South Africa, France, United Kingdom (LJY-Netzer, RSY-Netzer) and Ukraine. The Netzer Olami head office is in Beit Shmuel (the head office the World Union for Progressive Judaism) in Jerusalem.

Every year, the Netzer Veida Olamit (the decision-making and ideology forum) attracts participants from most of, if not all, the sniffim. Each snif (branch) has an equal voice and vote. The official ideology of Netzer Olami is set out in the Netzer Olami Platform, which was last changed in 2016.

=== The Netzer symbol ===
The Netzer semel (emblem)

The Netzer symbol was designed in Melbourne, Australia, by Daniel (Danny) L. Schiff.

== See also ==
- Reform Zionism
- Tikkun Olam
- Zionist youth movement
