= Green Point, Cape Town =

Green Point
- Suburb of Cape Town
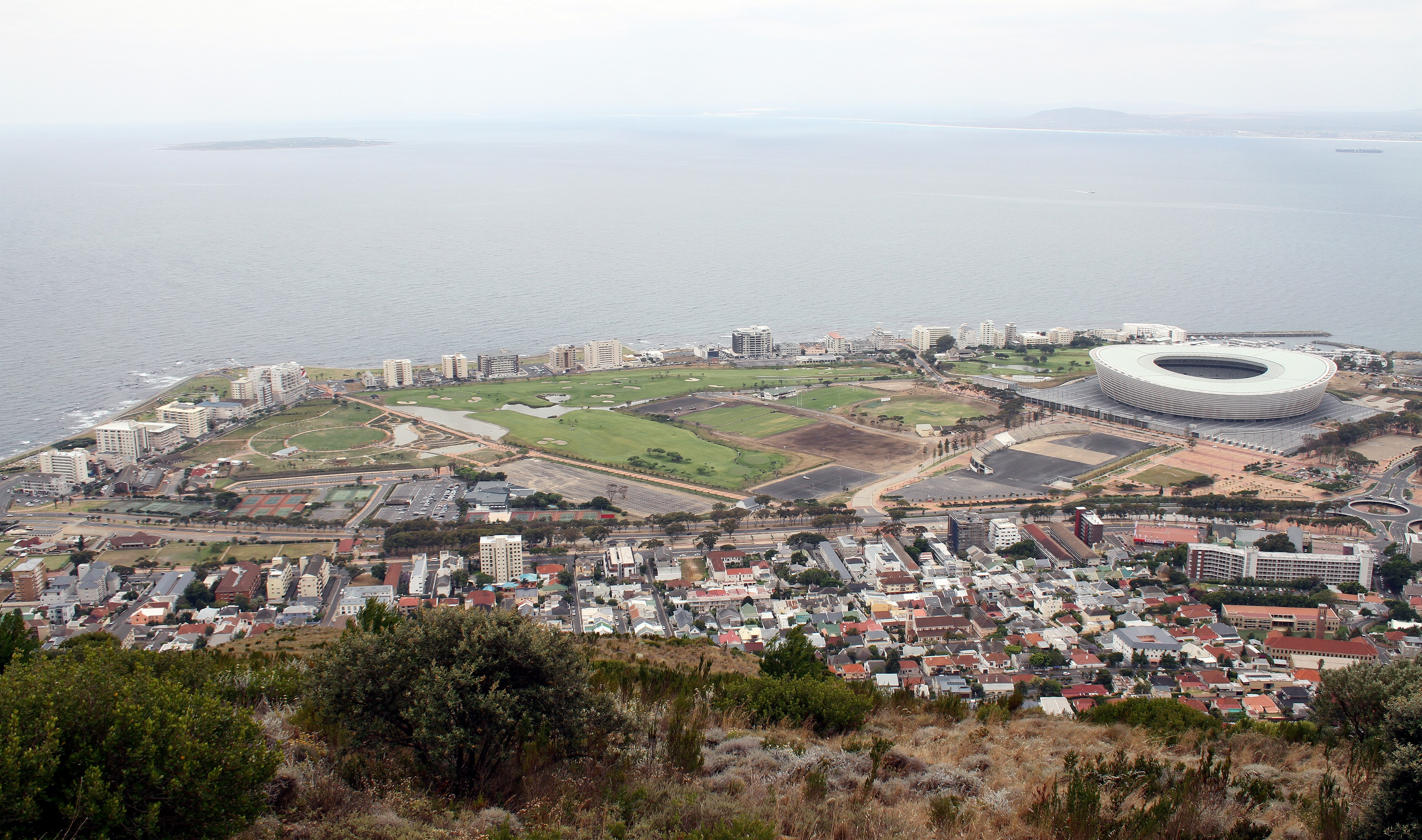
- An aerial view of Green Point from Signal Hill
- Interactive map of Green Point
- Coordinates: 33°54′S 18°24′E
- Country: South Africa
- Province: Western Cape
- Municipality: City of Cape Town
- Main Place: Cape Town

Area
  - Total: 2.01 km^{2} (0.78 sq mi)

Population (2011)
  - Total: 5,362
  - Density: 2,670/km^{2} (6,910/sq mi)

Racial makeup (2011)
  - Black African: 23.3%
  - Coloured: 10.9%
  - Indian/Asian: 2.2%
  - White: 60.9%
  - Other: 2.8%

First languages (2011)
  - English: 67.6%
  - Afrikaans: 15.2%
  - Xhosa: 3.2%
  - Zulu: 1.2%
  - Other: 12.8%
- Time zone: UTC+2 (SAST)
- Postal code (street): 8051
- PO box: 8005
- Area code: 021

Green Point (Afrikaans: Groenpunt) is a predominantly affluent, mixed-use suburb in the Atlantic Seaboard region of Cape Town, South Africa, located to the north west of Cape Town CBD. The suburb stretches from the coast to the bottom of Signal Hill, with Three Anchor Bay to its west and the V&A Waterfront to its east.

The area is home to Cape Town Stadium, a major sporting and events venue, and the largest of its kind in the Western Cape. The Sea Point Promenade, a coastal pathway, runs through the suburb, connecting it to nearby Three Anchor Bay and Sea Point. Somerset Road forms the main thoroughfare in Green Point, and is lined by restaurants, cafés, delis, boutiques, and nightclubs, and other commercial establishments.

== History ==
The area was originally a flat coastal plain to the fore of Signal Hill and included several dunes. Earlier maps also describe the area as the site of a “hottentot village”. The inhabitants are believed to have been descendants of the Khoisan and they would have farmed on Green Point Common before the arrival of European settlers.

The Common became a grazing area for the Dutch East India Company and the area was then known as “Waterplaats” (waterfront) by Dutch settlers. The Dutch made an unsuccessful attempt to construct a mole into Table Bay to protect the anchorage. This was funded through tax levies and the work was completed by slaves, convicts and employees of the Dutch East India Company. However, the mole was battered and destroyed by Atlantic Sea storms.

In response to the arrival of a British fleet in Simonstown, the Dutch built an artillery battery on a hill in the suburb. Following the British conquest of the Cape Colony in 1795, the city expanded towards Green Point owing to the development of the harbour and increases in both commerce and population. Horse racing flourished under the British, becoming a popular past time on the Common, with the African Turf Club established in 1797.

In 1859, Cape Governor, Sir George Grey lay the foundation stone for Somerset Hospital, which opened in the area in 1864. It is now a provincial heritage site. In 1889, a railway line ran through Green Point that connected Cape Town and Sea Point. The privately owned railway came under the control of Cape Government Railways in 1905. The line was eventually closed and the tracks were raised in 1929.

During the Second Boer War, the Common was home to temporary bungalows that housed British and colonial troops. The area of the Common used for horse racing was filled with tents to house Boer prisoners of war that were to be deported to Saint Helena, Bermuda and Ceylon.

During apartheid, Green Point was designated as a “whites-only” area as part of the Group Areas Act. Steve Bloom, a photographer known for his portraits of apartheid, lived locally in the 1970s and captured life under apartheid in the suburb. However, pockets of non-white residents lived in the suburb during this period. In the 1980s it was known as a “grey area”, a term used for racially mixed residential neighbourhoods during apartheid.

Cape Town Stadium opened in 2010 in time for the 2010 FIFA World Cup, replacing the previous Green Point Stadium on the same plot. Green Point Common, also known as Green Point Urban Park & Biodiversity Garden, is a major attraction in the area, and features a garden with indigenous plant species. Since 2017, Helen Bowden Nurses' Home in Green Point has been a flashpoint for the Reclaim The City movement and debates over affordable housing in the area.

In late 2025, the City of Cape Town unveiled a draft proposal to redevelop a large piece of land in Green Point, situated below Green Point Park, between Main Road and Helen Suzman Boulevard. The prime location, close to public transit, nature sites, and amenities, presents an opportunity to create a valuable mixed-use development, including commercial and residential buildings. Opportunity for public comment was opened on 6 November 2025, while an Open Day for public comments on the proposal was held on 12 November, and a non-statutory consultation period was set to run until 8 December 2025.

== Transportation ==
The suburb is served by the MyCiTi bus rapid transit system, with the Stadium BRT Station located along Helen Suzman Boulevard, just outside the Green Point Track athletic stadium. The 108 and 109 lines take passengers to Hout Bay, Sea Point, V&A Waterfront and Adderley Street in downtown Cape Town.

Somerset Road (which becomes Main Road as one heads westward), Helen Suzman Boulevard, and Bay Road are the main east-west roads passing through Green Point, and the area is served north-south mainly by Granger Bay Boulevard, Portswood Road, and Fritz Sonnenberg Road. Beach Road, a major road that runs along the Atlantic Seaboard, and the N1 freeway, are both nearby.

== Education ==
The area is home to a single school, Reddam House, which is a private institution serving pupils from kindergarten level through 12th grade.

Green Point families are also served by nearby schools in Sea Point and Three Anchor Bay;

- Herzlia Weizmann Primary, an independent Jewish primary school in Sea Point
- Cape Town French School, a French international school, with a primary school campus in Sea Point
- Ellerton Primary School, a public primary school in Three Anchor Bay
- Sea Point High School, a co-educational public high school in Sea Point

== Gallery ==
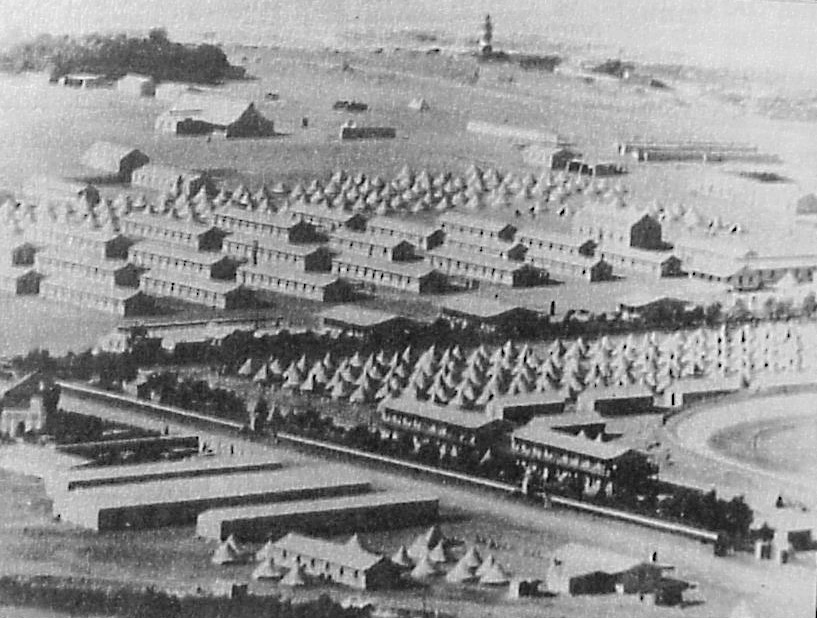
Green Point Common used as prisoner of war transit camp for Boer prisoners during the Second Boer War

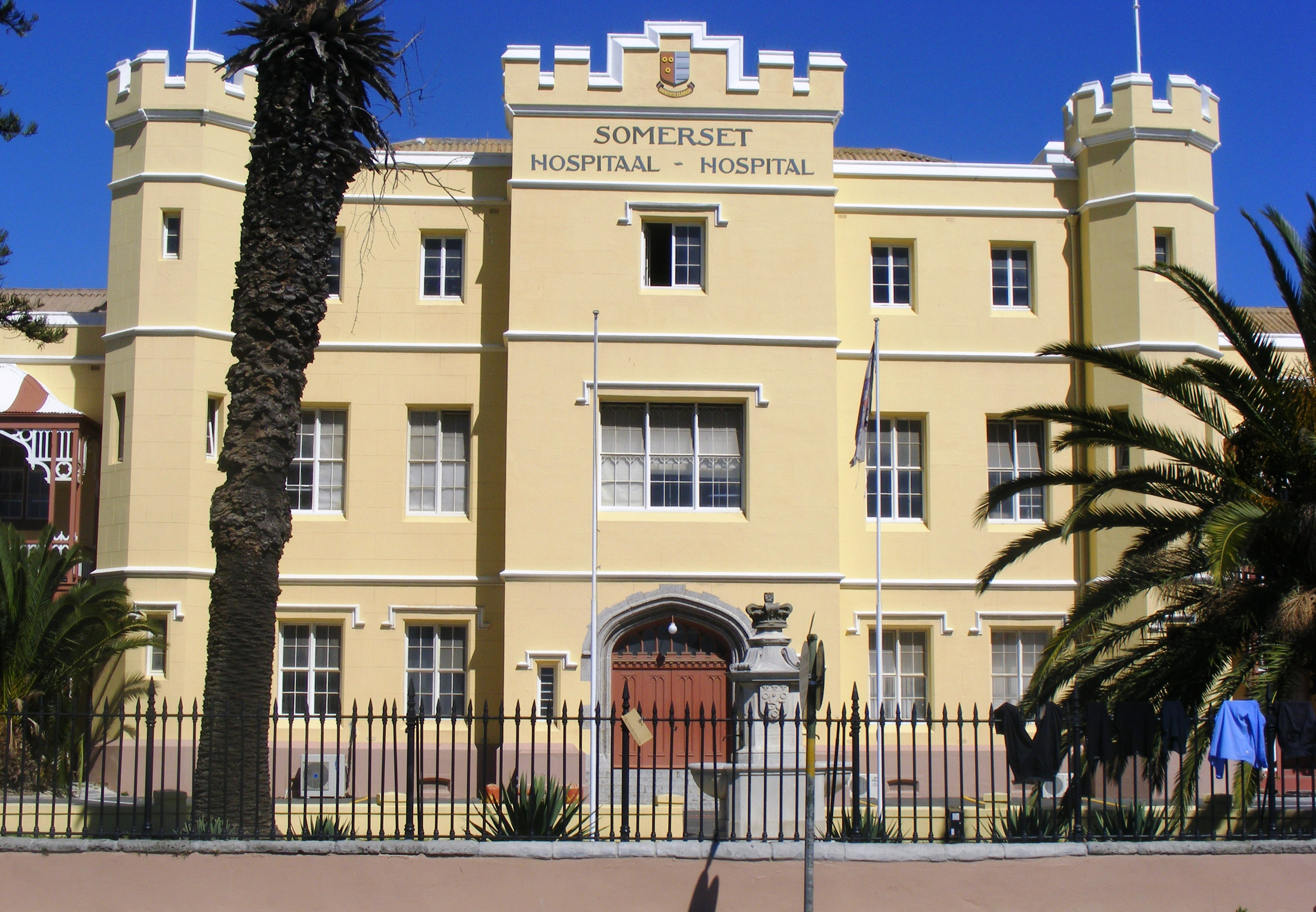
Somerset Hospital built in 1864

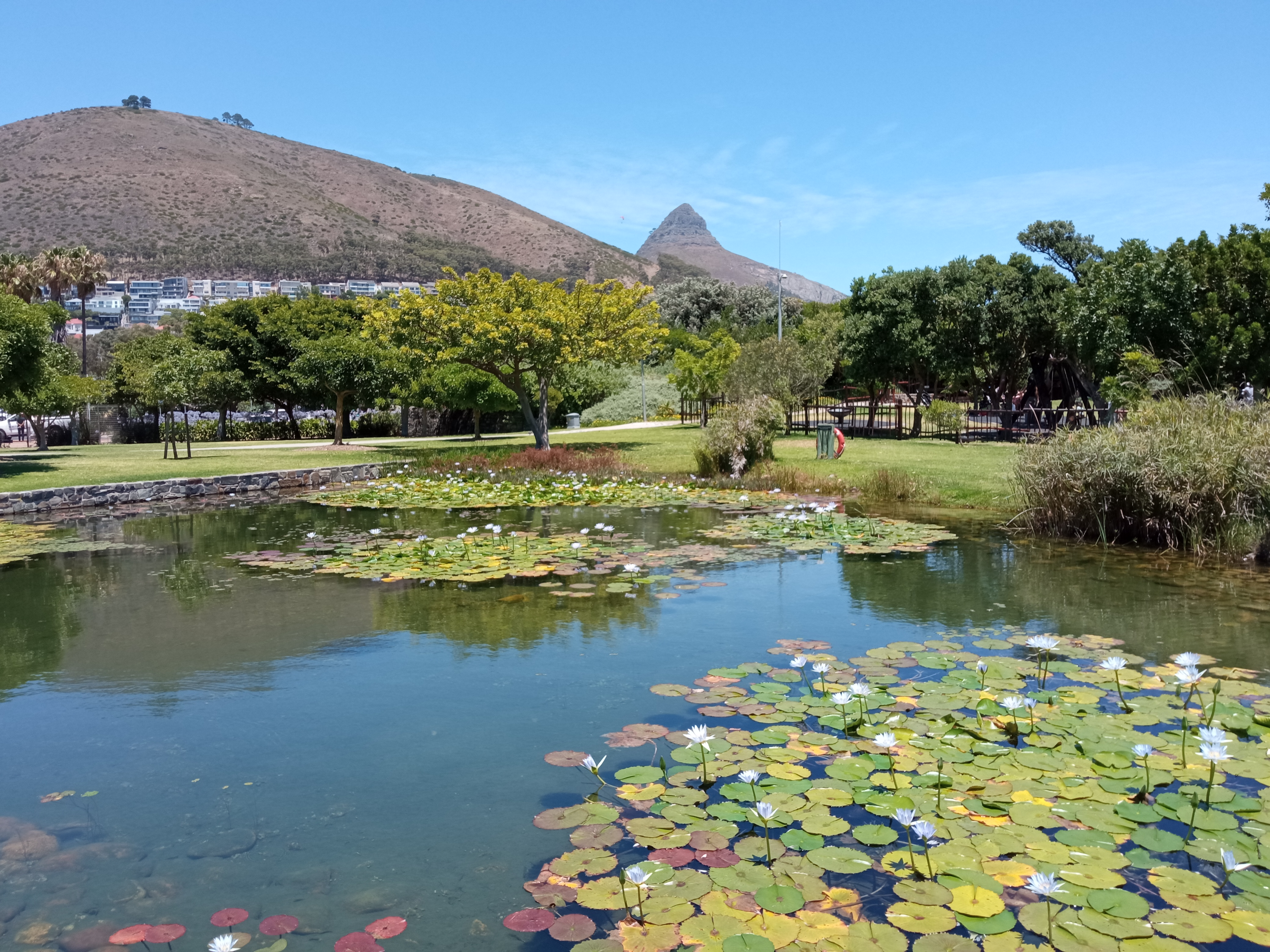
Pond in Green Point Park with Signal Hill and Lion's Head in the background.

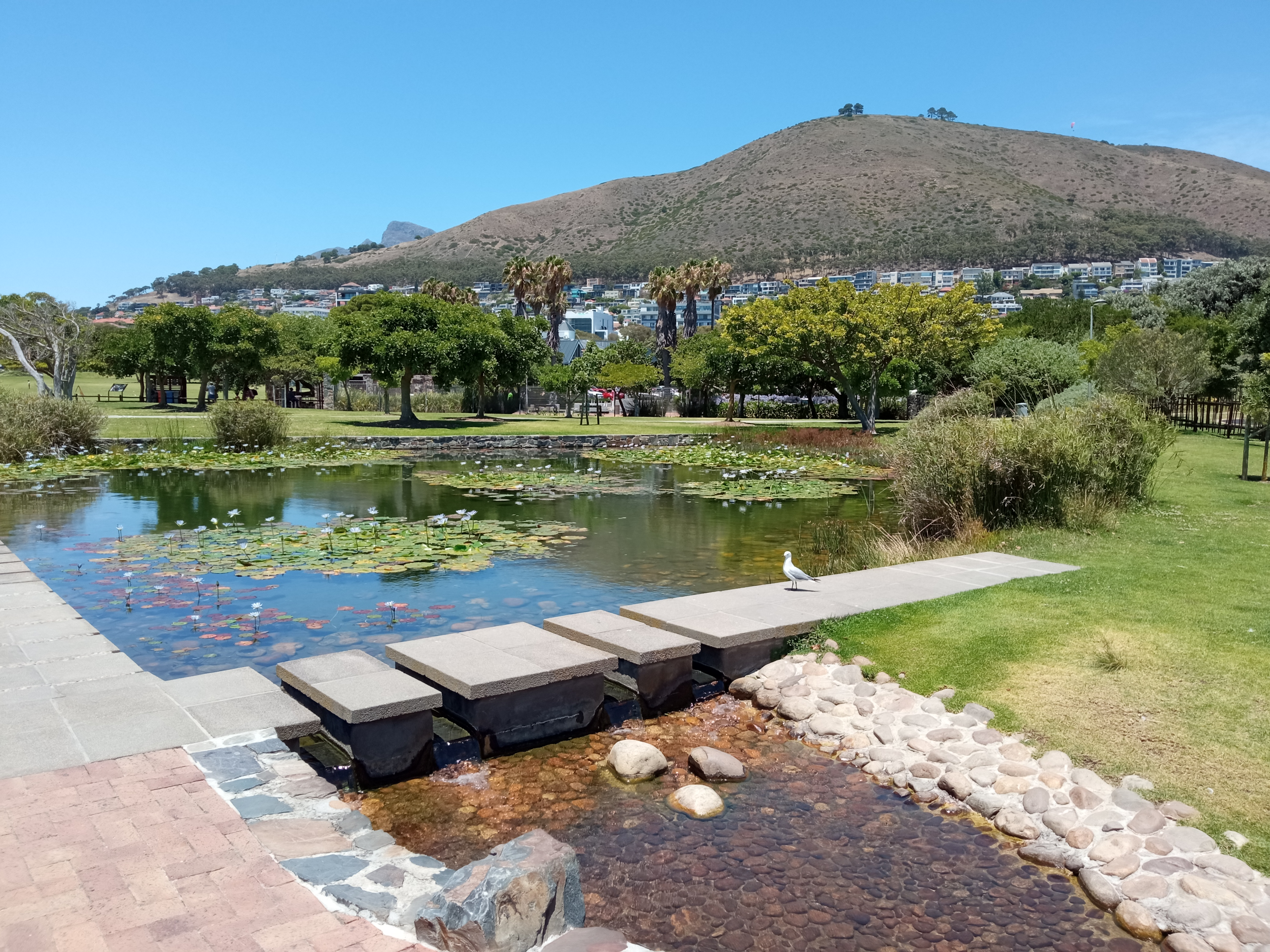
Stepping stone bridge in Green Point Park.

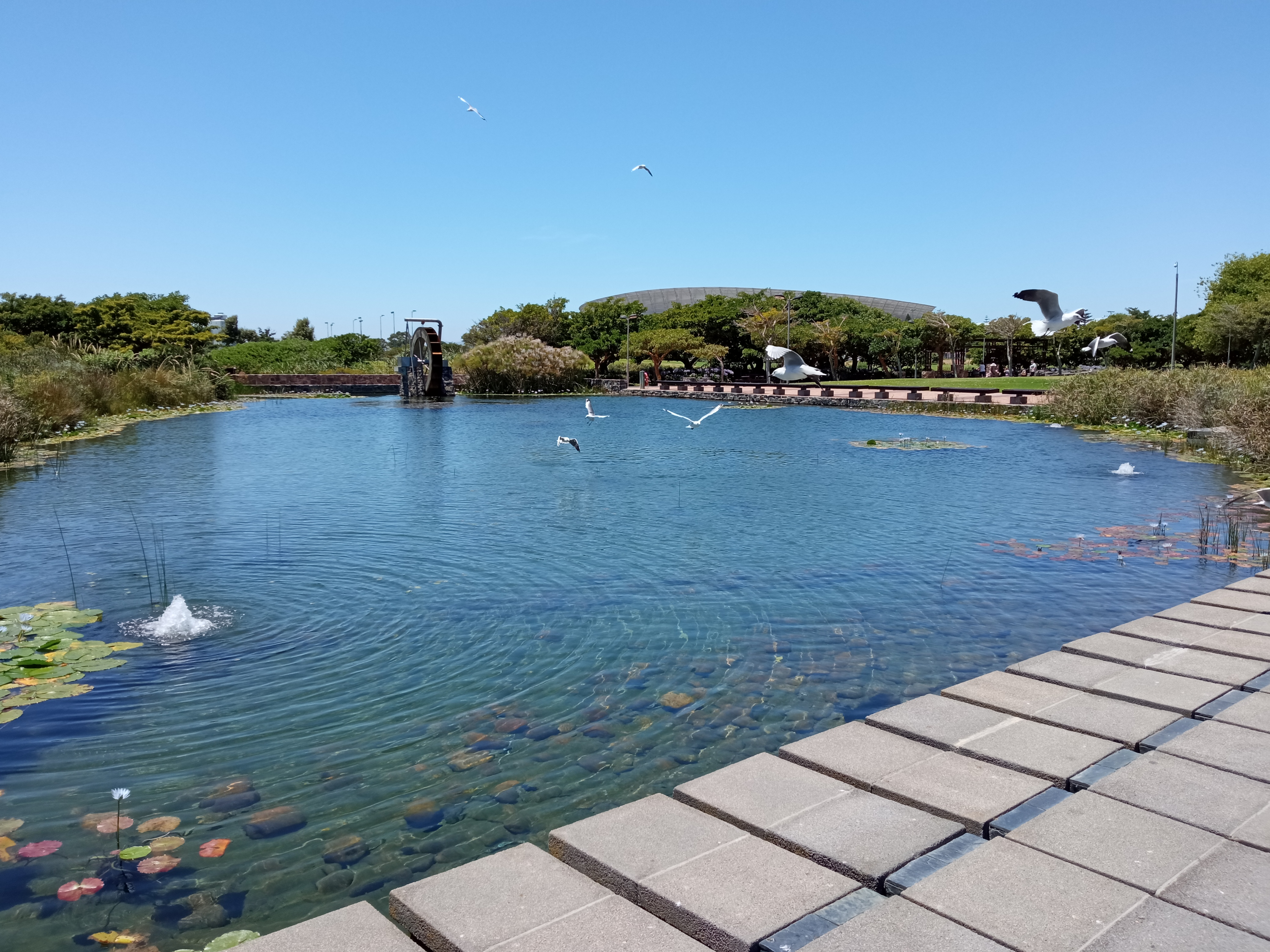
Pond in Green Point Park.

== See also ==
- Green Point Lighthouse, Cape Town
