= Ferrum High School =

Coordinates: 27.73117°S 29.94770°E

Location
- 6 Aquamarine Drive - Sunny Ridge; Newcastle, KwaZulu-Natal; South Africa

Information
- Type: Secondary school
- Motto: Veritas Vincet (Truth Conquers)
- Principal: Mrs C Myburgh
- Grades: 8 to 12
- Gender: Mixed
- Website: ferrum.org.za

Ferrum High School is a coeducational secondary school in Newcastle, KwaZulu-Natal, South Africa.

== Affiliations ==
The school is affiliated with Wellacre Academy and Shuttleworth College in the UK via the Afri Twin project. As part of the Afri Twin Scheme teachers from Wellacre Academy and Shuttleworth visit Ferrum High School annually. As part of the scheme both Wellacre, Shuttleworth and Ferrum have been twinned with a Township School. Ferrum High School also participates in PUK 16 sport series consisting of rugby, netball, hockey, and golf.
