= Tafelberg School =

Location
- 2 Swellengrebel Avenue, Bothasig; Cape Town, 7441; South Africa; 33.856°S 18.543°E

Information
- School type: Public, special school
- Motto: Nihil nimis difficile (Nothing is too difficult)
- Established: 23 July 1983
- Status: Open
- Principal: Lionel Benecke
- Grades: 1–12
- Enrollment: 400
- Language: English
- Colours: white, gold, navy blue
- Website: www.tafelbergschool.co.za

Tafelberg School is an English medium Grade 1–12 public school in Bothasig, Cape Town, South Africa which offers remedial activities for children with special learning needs. (Note: "Tafelberg High School – This is a school which caters exclusively for learning disabled children, yet in 2002 it has for the first time in the period under review had candidates who have achieved the Senior Certificate with matriculation endorsement.") The school was located in Sea Point before mid–2010. As of 2014, the school accommodates its full capacity of 400 students.

== History ==
Sea Point building

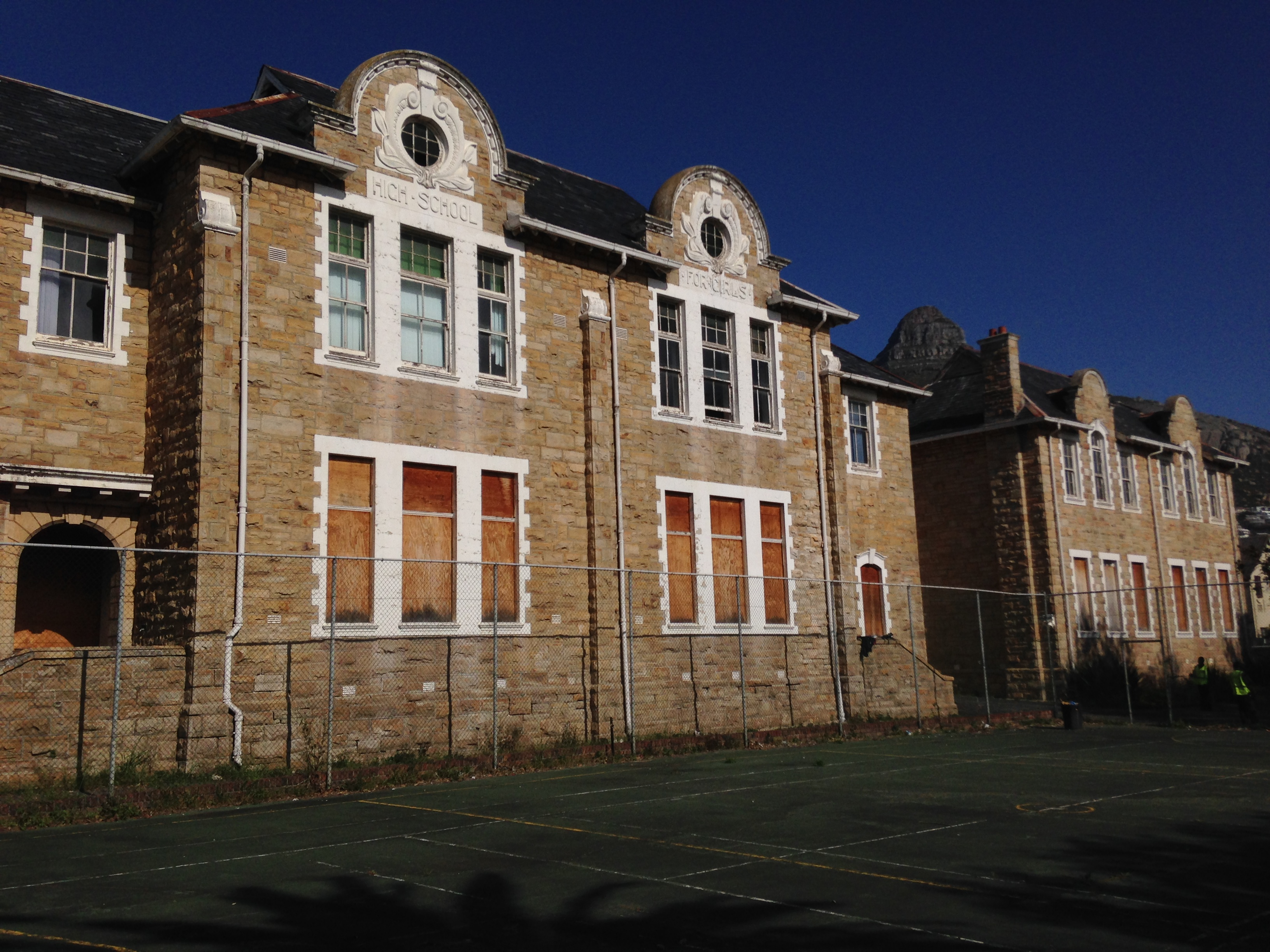
Vacant building in Sea Point's Main Road previously used by Tafelberg School

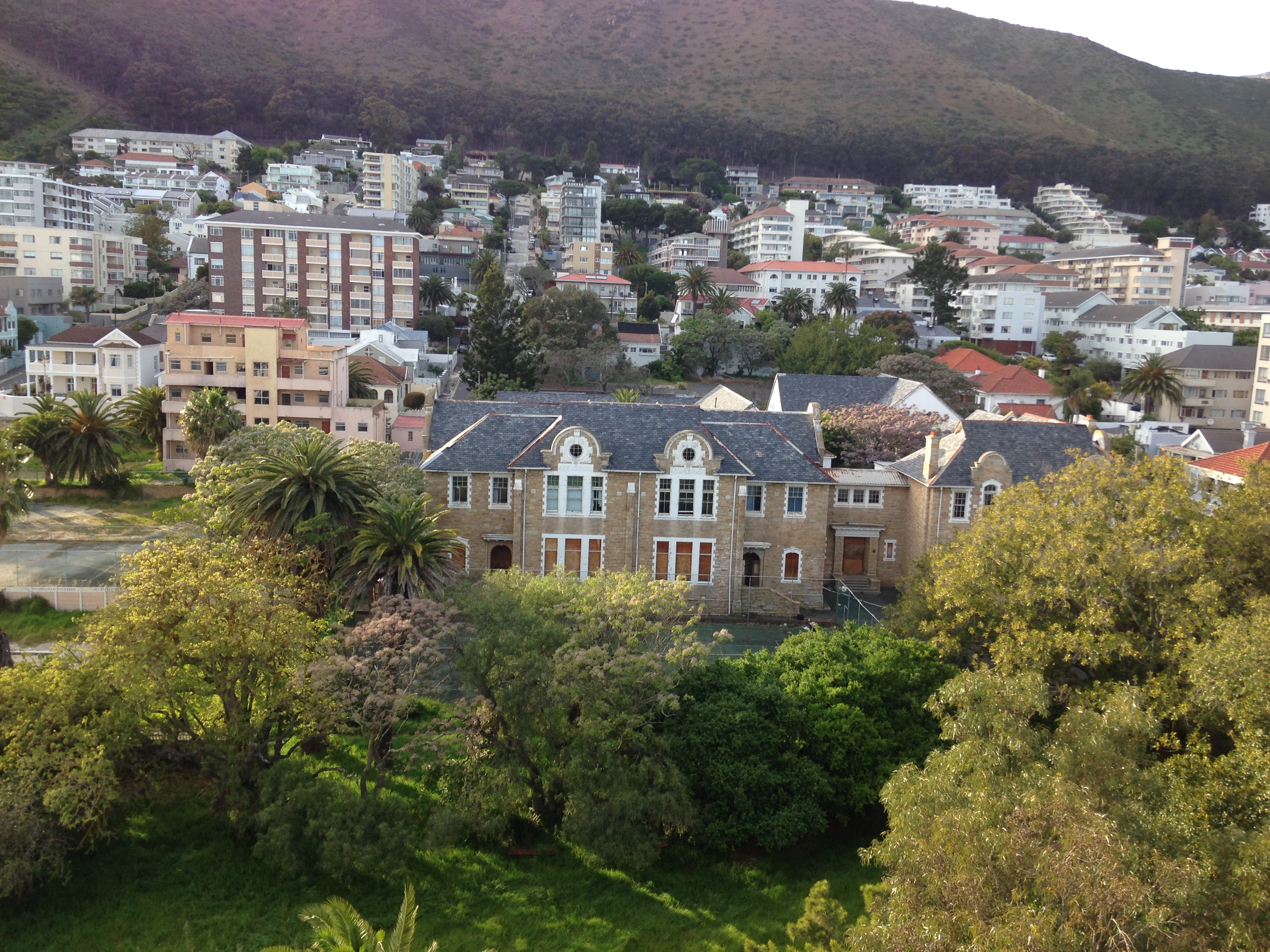
An aerial view of the old Tafleberg High School building in Sea Point, Cape Town after the school had moved premises and was vacant.

Tafelberg School was established on 23 July 1983. It was originally a school for white students, (Note: "The 11 applicant schools all provided for white children only.") and was based in Sea Point from the 1980s until 2010. The school was located at two separate sites in Sea Point and catered for children with special learning needs referred by schools throughout the Cape Peninsula. The junior school was located at 3 Kings Road, on the corner of Tramway Road. (Note: "Erven ... (formerly known as Tafelberg Junior School) ... situated at 3 Kings Road, Sea Point") The senior school was located in a building at 355 Main Road which had previously housed Ellerslie Girls' High School from 1899. (Note: "First property up for discussion was Tafelberg Remedial High School on 355 Main Road Sea Point. The developers would have to retain the 1899 Ellerslie Girls School building and the lane of wild fig trees on the properties.") (Note: "The so-called Ellerslie Girls' High School building complex, situated at 355 Main Road, Sea Point, Cape Town.") (Note: "Erf 1424 has a long tradition as a place of learning, dating back to 1899 when the property was purchased by the Department for Education for the establishment of Ellerslie Girls High School. From 1899 buildings were added incrementally to accommodate the Ellerslie Girls School and later the Tafelberg Remedial High School. The buildings stood vacant since the Tafelberg Remedial High School was relocated.") In 1989 Ellerslie Girls' High School vacated the building following a merger with Sea Point High School, formerly Sea Point Boys' High School, which had become co-educational and Tafelberg School subsequently occupied the vacant building. (Note: "In 1989, we amalgamated with Ellerslie Girls' High School after it had become clear that it was not viable to continue with separate schools for boys and girls in the Sea Point area. The decision was taken to use our premises for the new school and Tafelberg High moved into the vacant premises of Ellerslie Girls' High.")

Tafelberg School became racially integrated in a post-apartheid South Africa, (Note: "The formerly white Tafelberg School...") and junior (FP and IP) and senior sections (GET and FET) of the school have merged and moved to a new location in Bothasig in June 2010. (Note: "The pupils of the Tafelberg School moved to their new school building in the third term of 2010, which merged the primary and high schools, says the provincial education minister's spokesperson Bronagh Casey.") The construction of the new school building in Bothasig, "the first fully accessible resource centre in the province, both from a physical and curriculum accessibility point of view", cost R45 million. The move to a "more friendly learning environment" reduced the school's capacity in terms of student numbers and necessitated a one-third reduction in the number of classes per grade.

The 17,000 square metre site in Sea Point's Main Road previously used by the school and Ellerslie Girls' High School before that was declared a provincial heritage site in a government gazette dated 15 December 1989. The disused site has been proposed for redevelopment by the Western Cape Government, which says that it is suitable for a mixed-use development and has requested expressions of interest from parties interested in buying the property or leasing it for a period of up to 60 years provided that the original 1899 building and an avenue of wild fig trees are preserved.

In February 2014 it was reported that the Kings Road site in Sea Point previously used by the school was to be leased by the French School of Cape Town and R18 million worth of upgrades were planned for it.

== Academics ==
In 2002 Tafelberg School received a Special Superintendent-General Award from the Western Cape Education Department for having students achieve National Senior Certificates with matriculation endorsements. A matriculation endorsement allows students to study for a Bachelor's degree at any South African university. In April 2012, it was reported that Tafelberg School had achieved a 100% matric pass rate since the new school building opened in 2010.

== International exchange ==
Tafelberg School is twinned with Longcause Community Special School in Plymouth, England, an international exchange partnership facilitated by Afri Twin, which has linked over 250 schools in the United Kingdom and South Africa. Tafelberg students travelled overseas and visited the school and some other nearby schools including Hele's School and Woodcote High School in 2008, and again in 2010 during a tour of the United Kingdom. The visits incorporated cultural exchanges and sporting events.

== Ritalin use ==
In 1999 it was reported that an estimated one third of all pupils attending Tafelberg School were using Ritalin. School psychiatrist Suzette Swart said the use of the drug at the school was strictly controlled and it was only administered with permission in writing from a pupil's parent. She said they use the drug "to help children concentrate better", but not all children who have difficulty concentrating need it.
