= Ellerslie Girls' High School =

Girls' public high school in Sea Point, Cape Town, South Africa

Coordinates: 33.9159°S 18.3908°E

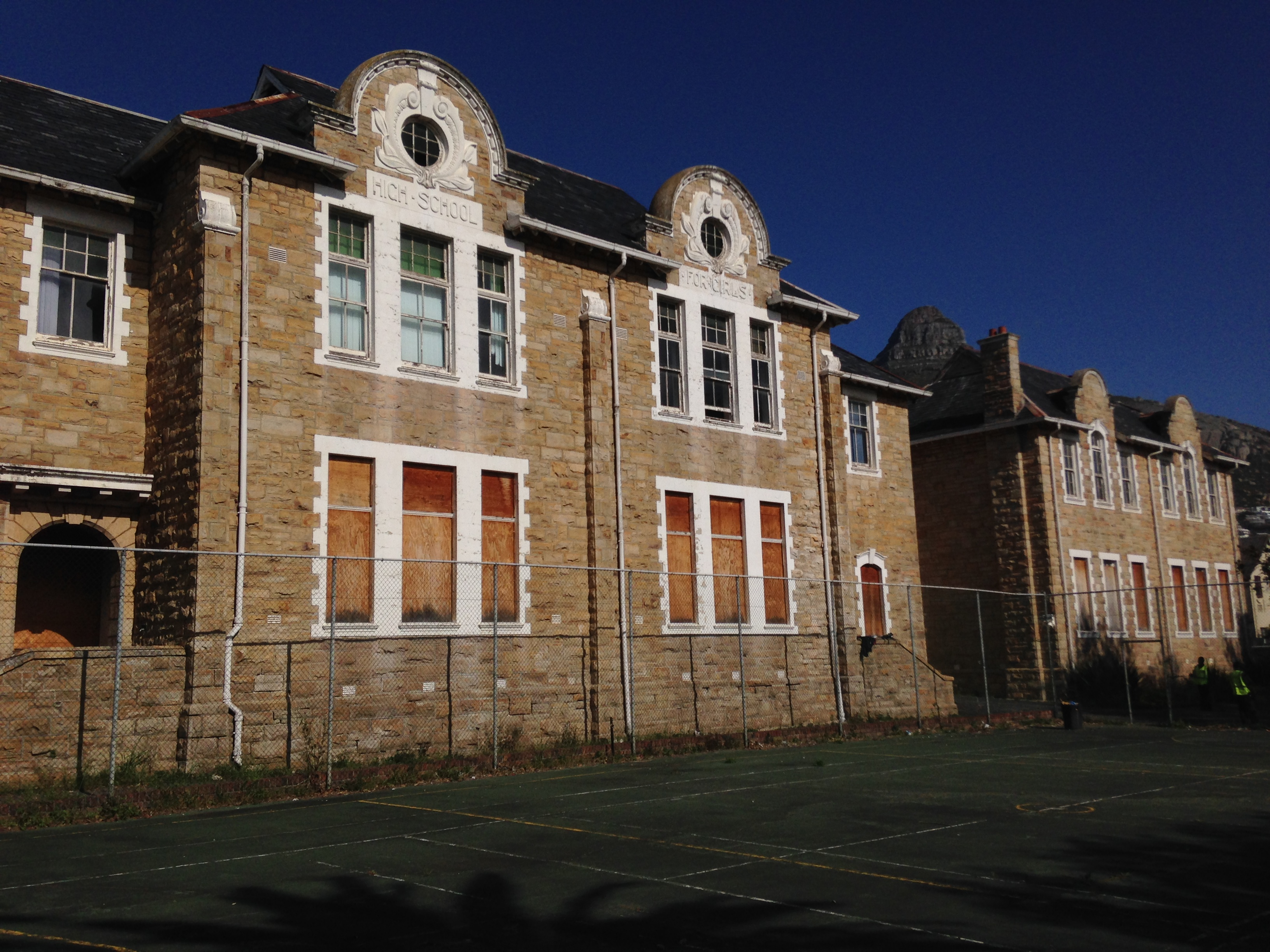

Information
- Established: 1898
- Closed: 1989
- Gender: Girls

Ellerslie Girls' High School was a girls' public high school at 355 Main Road, Sea Point, Cape Town, South Africa. The school was established in 1898. In 1989 the school merged with Sea Point High School, formerly Sea Point Boys' High School, which had become co-educational.

== School building ==
The school building dates from 1899, located on Sea Point's Main Road, was designed by Scottish architect John Parker. It housed the school until it merged with Sea Point High School in 1989. It subsequently housed Tafelberg School's high school section until 2010.

The site was declared a provincial heritage site in a government gazette dated 15 December 1989.

The disused 17,000 square metre site has been proposed for redevelopment by the Western Cape Government, which says that it is suitable for a mixed-use development and has requested expressions of interest from parties interested in buying the property or leasing it for a period of up to 60 years, provided that the original 1899 building and an avenue of wild fig trees are preserved.

== Notable alumni ==
- Barbara Follett – British politician
- Ethel Drus -Historian and key member of the Committee that drafted the Freedom Charter
