= Longcause Community Special School =

Location
- Longcause; Plymouth, Devon, PL7 1JB; England
- Coordinates: 50°23′00″N 4°02′42″W

Information
- Type: Community special school
- Department for Education URN: 113650 Tables
- Ofsted: Reports
- Chair of Governors: Fred Jenkins
- Headteacher: Anne Hutchinson
- Gender: Co-educational
- Age: 4 to 16
- Enrolment: 105

Longcause Community Special School is a special school for students aged 4 to 16 with learning difficulties. The college has about 100 students.

The school specialises in children with cognitive, learning, communication and interaction difficulties.

== Cultural exchange ==
Longcause Community Special School has an exchange partnership with Tafelberg School in Cape Town organised by Afri Twin. In 2008 students from Tafelberg had visited Longcause School and in 2010 the visit was repeated. Students and teachers from Tefelberg incorporated a visit to Longcause School into a tour they made. Tafelberg School students also visited the nearby and much older Hele's School which dates back to 1658. French and Chinese teachers working at Hele's school have also given lessons at Longcause and there has been another teacher exchange with GlenBridge Special School in South Africa. These exchanges won the school an International School Award in 2009 presented by George Alagiah.
