= Wellacre Academy =

Location
- Irlam Road; Flixton, Greater Manchester, M41 6AP; England; 53°26′51″N 02°23′39″W

Information
- Other names: Wellacre; Wellacre Technology Academy
- Former names: Wellacre Technology College; Urmston Wellacre County Secondary School
- Type: Academy
- Motto: Inspire, Achieve, Enjoy
- Established: 25 April 1955
- Local authority: Trafford Council
- Trust: Wellacre Technology Academy Trust
- Department for Education URN: 136378 Tables
- Ofsted: Reports
- Principal: Julie Sharrock
- Gender: Boys
- Age range: 11–16
- Enrolment: 625 (2019)
- Capacity: 1,443
- Houses: Turing; Pankhurst; Lowry
- Colour: Royal blue
- Website: www.wellacre.org

Wellacre Academy (simply referred to as Wellacre and officially Wellacre Technology Academy, formerly Wellacre Technology College and Urmston Wellacre County Secondary School) is an 11–16 boys, secondary school with academy status in Flixton, Greater Manchester, England. It was formerly a foundation school that was established in 1955 and adopted its present name after becoming an academy in 2011.

The school had a sixth form that was established in 2009, but closed in 2017 due to a small number of students enrolling, resulting in it not being financially sustainable. It is noted for having more solar panels than any other school in Great Britain.

== History ==
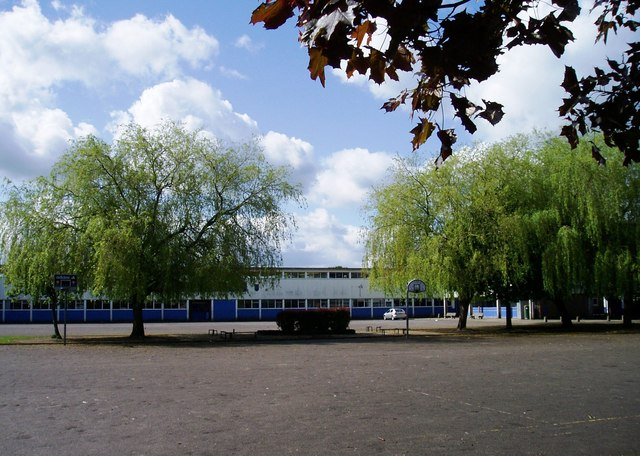
The school in May 2006.

Wellacre Academy was established on 25 April 1955 as Urmston Wellacre County Secondary School. It had a grand opening ceremony on 27 April 1955 and renamed to Wellacre Technology College after being awarded 'specialist status' as a Technology College in 2002. Since the status change to the summer of 2005, £1 million had been invested into the school with the development of new facilities including ICT suites, a language laboratory and a floodlit all-weather pitch.

It was designated a Technology College again in December 2006 and became the first and only single-sex school in England and Wales to be rated 'outstanding' by Ofsted, following its inspection in May 2007. Due to this rating, it was awarded expansion money and was close to having its proposal approved for the construction of two prefabricated studio buildings on the western end of the school which would be used for brickwork and engineering teaching, following Trafford Council's planning committee who voted that they were 'minded to grant' on 12 July 2007. The council had received 27 objection letters from nearby residents who had also protested over various concerns including affecting the quality of life, its impact on the wildlife, noise and litter, and taking into account of the all-weather pitch that had already made residents' life a misery. As the council had an ownership interest meant it was required to refer the final decision to the Department for Communities and Local Government.

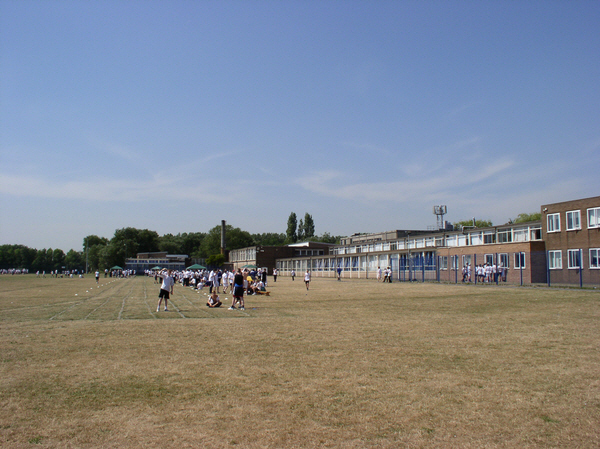
View at the rear of the school during sports day in July 2006.

It opened a 300 place mixed sixth form in September 2009, in a new £7 million three-storey high building at the front of the existing school grounds. It was approved by Trafford Council in September 2007 and paid for with a 'Learning and Skills Council Dedicated Schools Grant'. In 2010, it was visited by Starchaser Industries with their Skybolt rocket as part of the school's science and technology day, with an aim to encourage students to study science.

It renamed to Wellacre Technology Academy after becoming an academy in January 2011; the school was able to apply for the status due to its Ofsted rating of 'outstanding'. In February 2012, it linked with Ferrum High School as part of the Afri Twin, an initiative to encourage mutually beneficial relationships between schools in the United Kingdom and South Africa.

It closed its sixth form in July 2017 following public consultation due to a small number of students enrolling, resulting in it not being financially sustainable. As it was built to accommodate 300 students, it has never had more than 100 and in 2015, it had only 24. The school had to "subsidise the sixth form from other funding streams such as that for students in the main school" because of the small numbers, and sixth forms with less than 200 students are recognised by the Department for Education (DfE) as being at risk of not being financially viable. Current students were able to finish their studies and the 15 that had applied to join in September 2016, had to find places elsewhere.

== Structure ==
=== Governance ===
Wellacre Academy is a state-funded secondary school for boys aged between 11 and 16. It was formerly a foundation school that converted to an academy in January 2011 and is overseen by the Wellacre Technology Academy Trust, a single-academy trust. Day-to-day governance of the school is the responsibility of its governing body who are all trustees and directors of the trust, and is made up of 12 school governors with a four-year term of office (except the principal).

=== Demographics ===
The school has a capacity of 1,443 and 625 students attended during the 2018–2019 academic year; 9.6% were eligible for free school meals. For the 2017–2018 academic year, there were 43.5 teachers on a full-time equivalent basis with a student–teacher ratio of 15.2, below the national average of 16.0. There were also 9 teaching assistants and 19 support staff. As of May 2017, the number of students from minority ethnic groups and who speak English as an additional language is below national average. The number of students who receive support for special educational needs is above national average.

=== Admissions ===
The school is a comprehensive school and is able to admit 180 new Year Seven students (aged 11) per annum, with its applications for Year Seven managed by its local authority Trafford Council which covers the Trafford area; the school's catchment area. For those living outside of this area would need to apply via their local authority. Applications for Year Eight to Eleven are made directly with the school which has an admission number of 180 for their current students. The uniform consists of a royal blue blazer with the school's red crest, grey V-neck jumper, tie with the relevant colour indicating the house the student is assigned to, dark waterproof coat, dark grey trousers, white shirt, formal black shoes, and dark socks.

==== House system ====
The school has a house system consisting of three 'houses' and are named after a notable Mancunian, which was voted by students and staff who are allocated to a house. Each house has a colour and a mascot linked to the school's crest. The houses are:

- Turing — Green and eagle
- Pankhurst — Purple and lion
- Lowry — Yellow and griffin

== Curriculum ==
As of 2019, the Key Stage 4 curriculum is divided into two parts and all subjects are taken at Level 2: GCSE or Applied equivalent. The first part is known as the 'core curriculum' which is compulsory for all students and consists of English language and English literature (single GCSEs), mathematics (one GCSE), combined science (worth two GCSEs), core physical education and RESPECT (non-examination) which follows national recommendations for three categories of lessons; health and well-being, relationships and living in the wider world.

The second part is known as 'options' which is split into two types, GCSE and Technical Awards (GCSE equivalent); students choose three options in Year Nine with some combinations prohibited. The GCSE options include fine art, computer science, French, geography, history, religious education, Spanish, triple science, and food preparation and nutrition. The Technical Awards options include Level 2 Award in Constructing the Built Environment, Level 2 Award in Designing the Built Environment, Cambridge Nationals Level 2 in Creative iMedia, BTEC music, BTEC performing arts (acting) and BTEC sport. Students are encouraged to complete the English Baccalaureate suite of subjects but are not compelled to do a modern foreign language.

In March 2021, the murder of Sarah Everard led to petitions calling for the curriculum in schools to include lessons about public sexual harassment and for more to be done in schools to change attitudes and behaviour. Students at Wellacre returned to school following a nationwide COVID-19 lockdown with questions about Sarah's case, its subsequent protests, and requesting special classes; sexual harassment is taught at Wellacre as part of relationship, sex and health education (RSHE), and the school addressed the case in these classes. The success of RSHE at Wellacre attracted interest from other schools in the UK and internationally to share expertise and resources. It became compulsory for all schools to teach the topic of harassment as part of a new RSHE curriculum in September 2021, and was already covered by some schools as part of their personal, social, health and economic education (PSHE).

== Extra-curricular activities ==
The school offers a range of extra-curricular activities including independent learning, Cyber Discovery, table tennis and basketball. The school day on Wednesday is extended by one hour to accommodate the school's co-curricular programme, which sees students selecting from a range of sessions such as the school production, cryptography, astronomy, debating and The Duke of Edinburgh's Award.

== Eco-friendly facilities ==
The school's eco-friendly facilities include energy saving systems throughout and in 2010, it opened an Eco Centre. Two bee colonies were added the following year, with the honey produced sold in the school and also exported to a girls' school in Bavaria, Germany, as part of Wellacre's international partnership with that school and an enterprise project.

The school had 1,720 solar panels installed via a free-fit solar scheme in September 2016, giving it more solar panels than any other school in Great Britain. This installation will allow the school to generate more than £2 million in electricity savings over the next 25 years and be used for education. The scheme is part of a power purchase agreement with Eden Sustainable that was arranged by Green Energy International.

== Awards and recognition ==
In July 2005, Wellacre was awarded the Artsmark Silver status by Arts Council England. In October 2006, it was visited by track cyclist Chris Hoy who helped to promote cycling and staying safe. The school was praised by professional rugby league footballer and coach Paul Broadbent following his visit in May 2012, as part of the Sky Sports 'Living for Sport'; a free secondary school initiative in partnership with the Youth Sport Trust, that uses sport stars and skills to improve the lives of students.

In 2015, Wellacre was identified as the most improved school in Greater Manchester, and was visited by professional football player Juan Mata who supported the school in their second round match against North Liverpool Academy in the Under 15 PlayStation Schools' Cup, a partnership between PlayStation and the English Schools' Football Association that is designed to foster football in schools. Mata also took part in the pre-match warm-up with the school and a question-and-answer session with both schools, as well as the school's media students. It was awarded the 'Platinum Partner' status by the Royal Air Force in July 2016.

In November 2017, it became the first secondary school in North West England to be awarded the 'Dyslexia Friendly Quality Mark' by the British Dyslexia Association. As a result, the school is recognised as a safe place for those with dyslexia by meeting the Association's standards. Wellacre students won the 'Most Innovative Garden Design' award by the Royal Horticultural Society in December 2017 at the Whitworth Art Gallery, as part of its Green Plan-It Challenge regional competition. In March 2018, it was visited by the Bishop of Middleton Mark Davies as part of his special programme for Holy Week. He spoke to Year 8 students, answered questions from Year 10 religious education students, and was presented with a new decorative cross to mark 50 years of links between the school and St John's Church, Flixton that was designed by the school's staff and students; bearing significance in that former students had designed, created and paid for a cross on the entrance of the church building when it was built in 1968.

== Controversies ==
=== Mobile phone mast ===
In 2002, the mobile network operator Orange had plans to put two satellite dishes onto its mobile phone mast which was located on the school's rooftop, but was met with opposition from the local community due to health concerns, especially children and the potential effect on other schools in close proximity. It was to be discussed by Trafford Council's planning committee in early January 2002 but was deferred to the end of the month, at the request of the school governors. It was approved by the committee the following month who voted unanimously in favour of granting planning permission and as the proposal met current government guidelines and the Stewart Report for the health and safety standards, they agreed the plans could not be refused on the grounds of a 'perceived' risk to health. However, as the school governors were landowners meant they had the ultimate control over whether it goes ahead and said "they do not wish to renew the contract for the mast and they will arrange for the removal of the equipment at the earliest possible time".

=== Manchester Arena bombing suspect ===
The school released a statement on 25 May 2017 confirming the perpetrator of the Manchester Arena bombing was a former student at the school. Due to media interest, it requested the media to consider the impact it had not only on its students but throughout Greater Manchester, and "respectfully ask for the media to permit the school to continue with its daily business, undisturbed". The school issued no further statements on the matter.

== Notable alumni ==
- Bradley Rea, professional boxer
- Dan Mooney, professional footballer
