= Green Point Park =

Park in Green Point, Cape Town, in South Africa

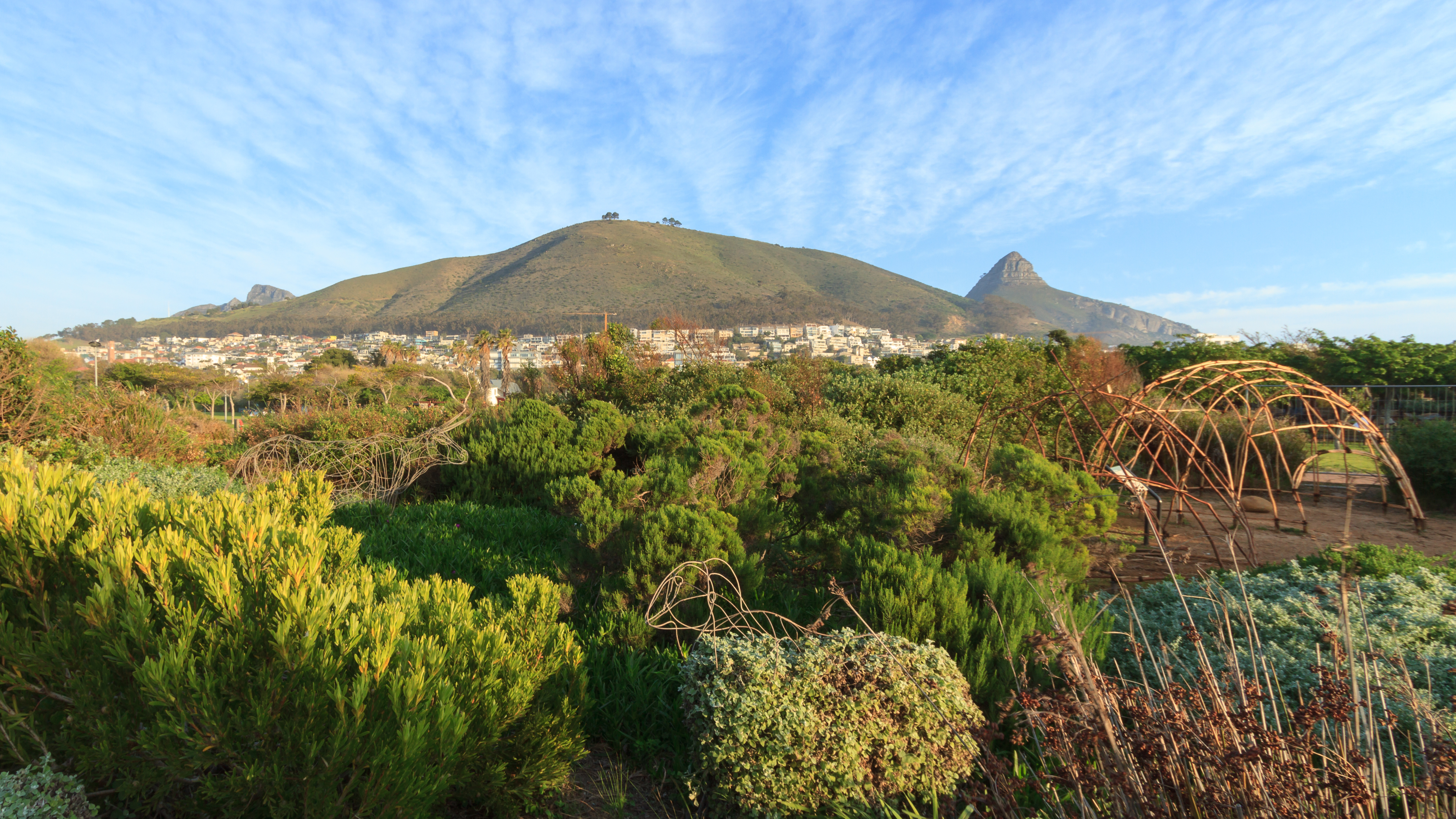
- Interactive map of Green Point Park
- Type: Urban biodiversity park
- Location: Green Point, Cape Town
- Coordinates: 33.9041596°S 18.4012°E
- Website: Green Point Park and Biodiversity Showcase Garden

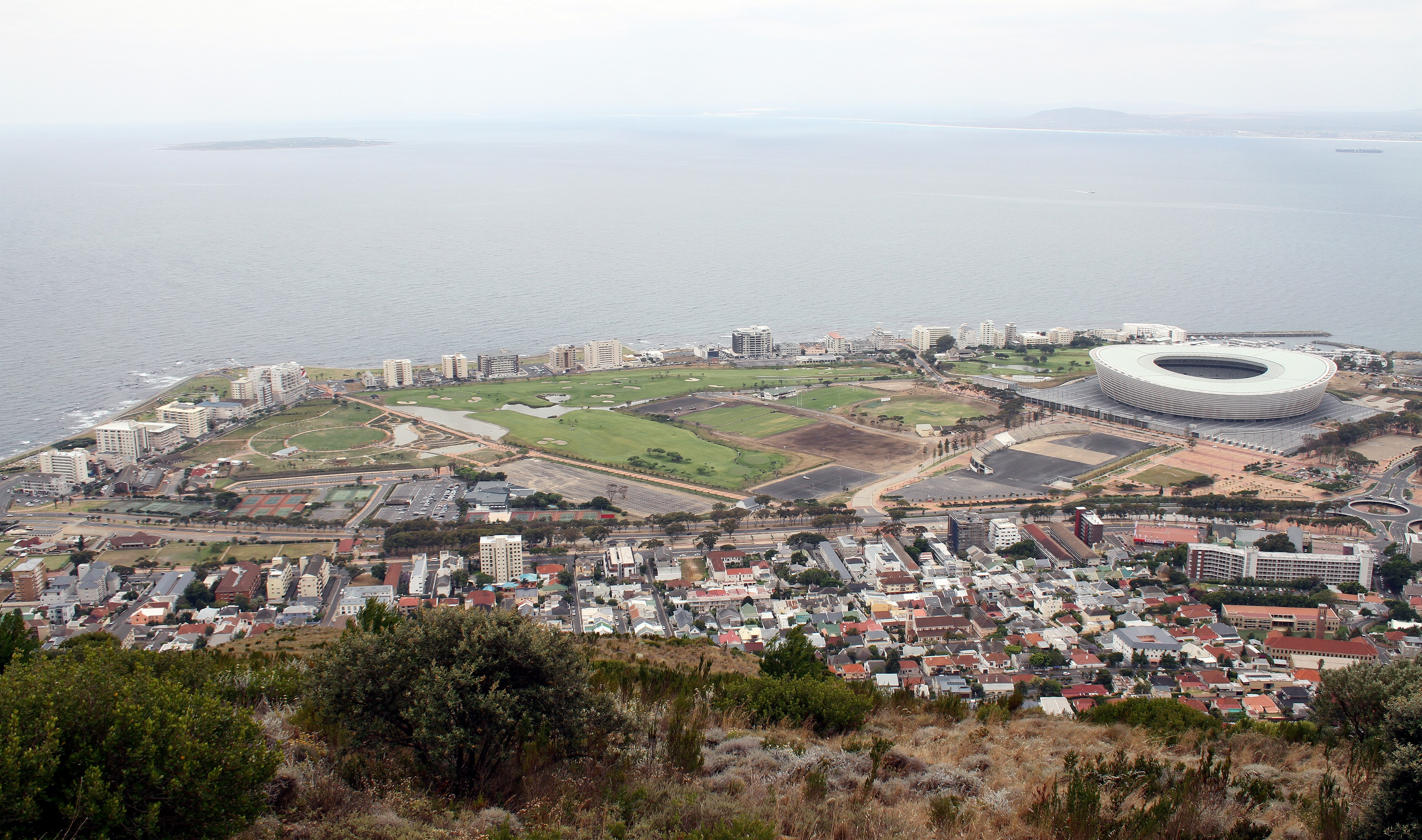
Green Point Common, seen from Signal Hill

Map of Green Point Common

Green Point Park, is a public park in Green Point, Cape Town, in South Africa, where numerous playing fields, wetlands, walking paths, gardens, and a golf course are situated. The Green Point Urban Park & Biodiversity Garden is just behind Mouille Point and has an entrance on Bay Road.

The Green Point Park is open from 09:00-19:00, Monday to Sunday, and is free to access.

== Biodiversity Showcase Garden ==
The Biodiversity Showcase Garden is an educational garden showcasing indigenous biodiversity from the Cape floristic region and biomes within South African, as well as demonstrating environmentally responsible gardening practices. It was developed as part of the Green Goal initiative linked to the 2010 FIFA World Cup.

The themes presented in the garden include “people and plants”, which includes the lifestyles of Khoikhoi herders and early Cape settlers; “discover biodiversity”, which explains the distinctiveness of Cape biodiversity and threats to it; and a “wetland walk”, which recalls the seasonal wetland landscape formerly associated with Green Point Common.

== Gallery ==
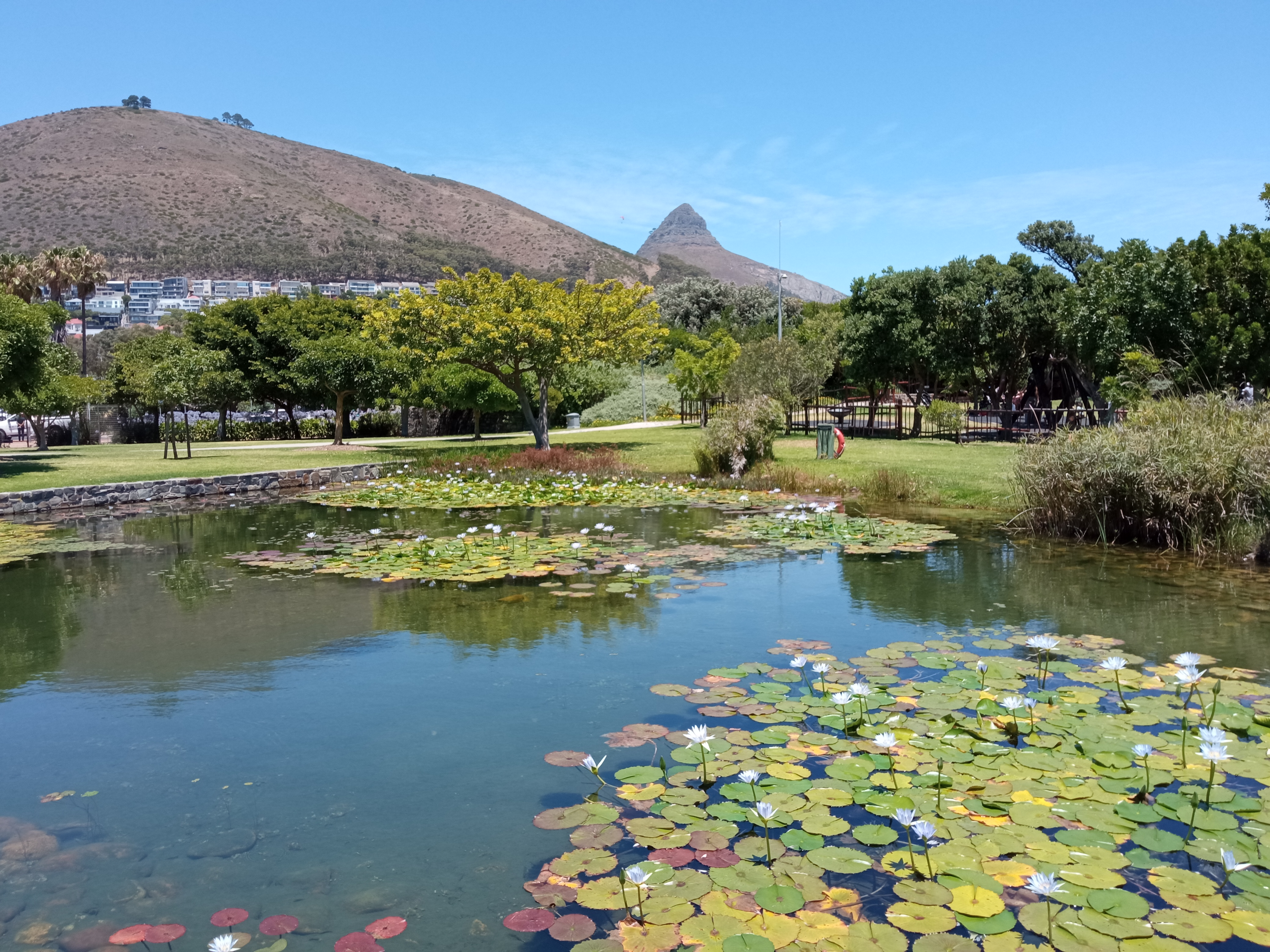
Pond in Green Point Park with Signal Hill and Lion's Head in the background.

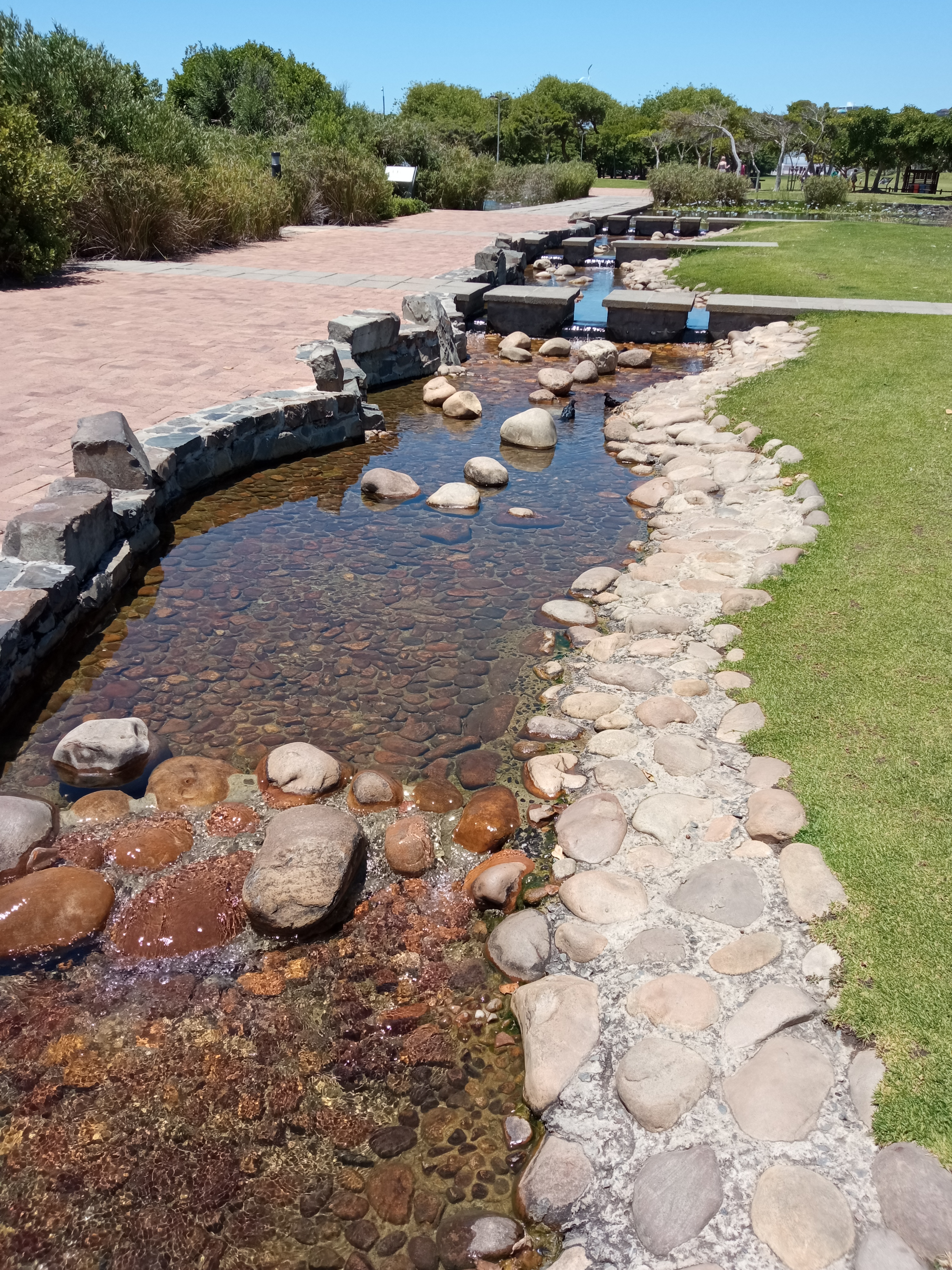
Stream in Green Point Park.

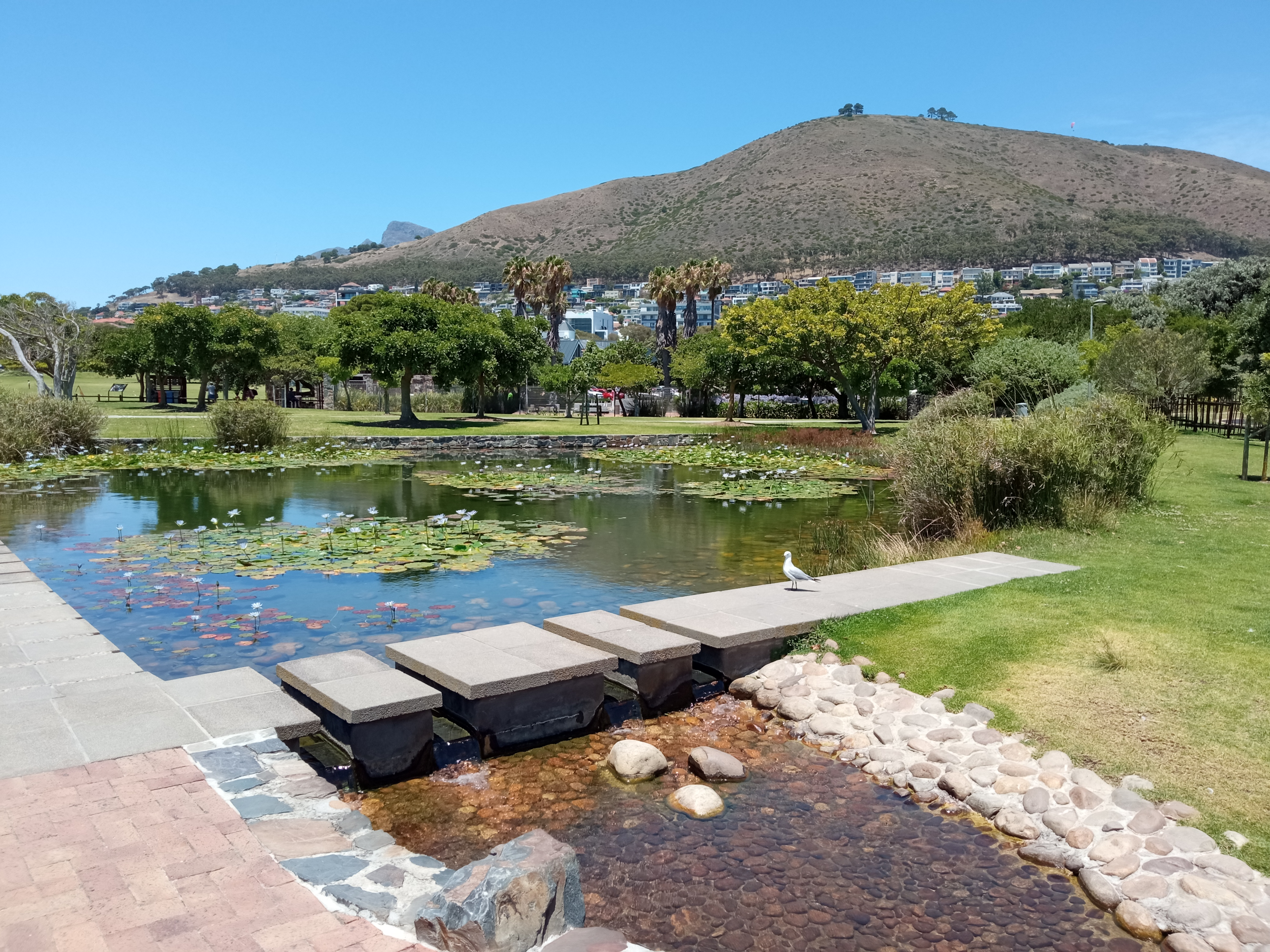
Stepping stone bridge in Green Point Park.

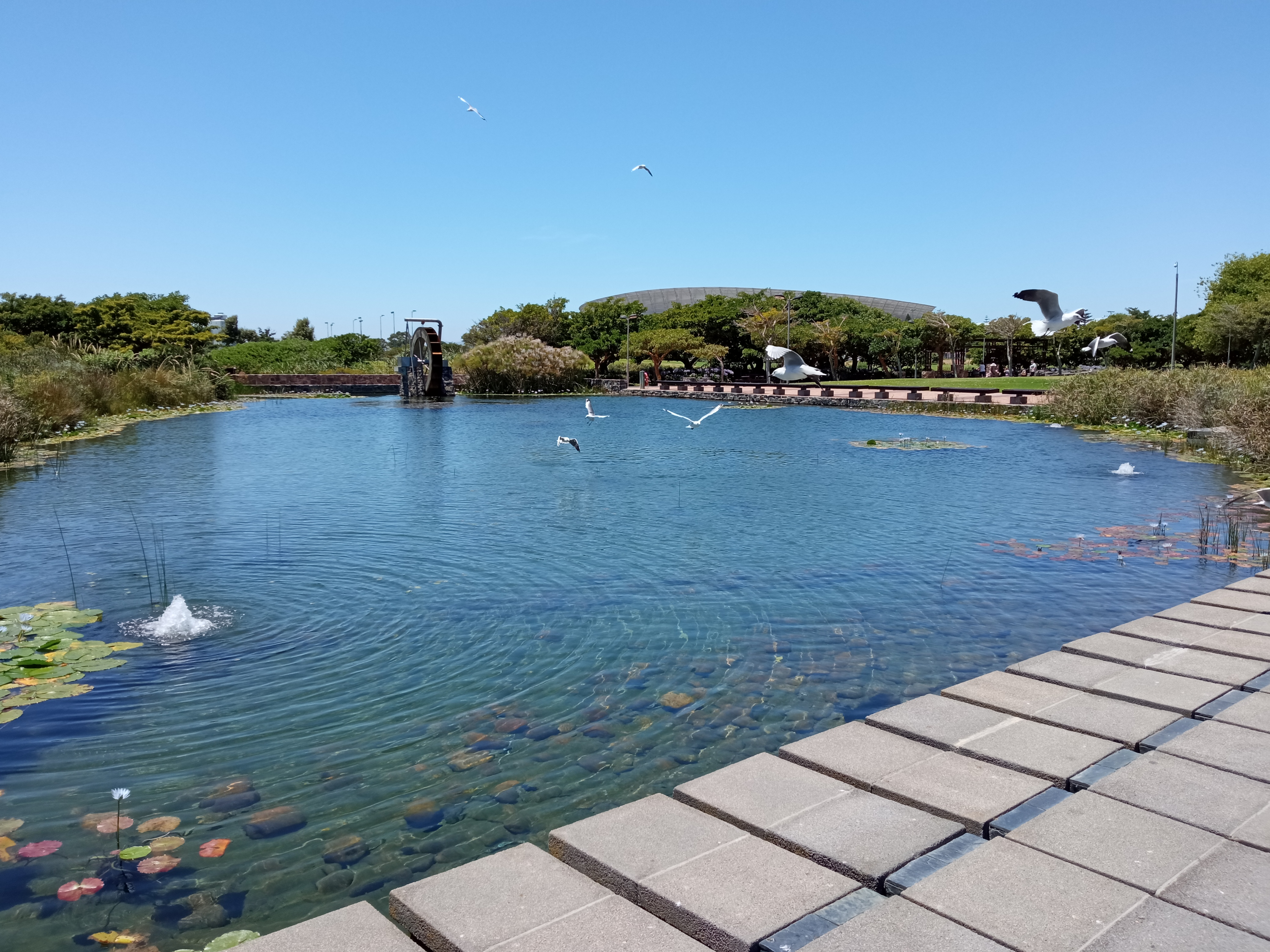
Pond in Green Point Park.
