= Graaff's Pool =

Public park and arboretum in Claremont, Cape Town

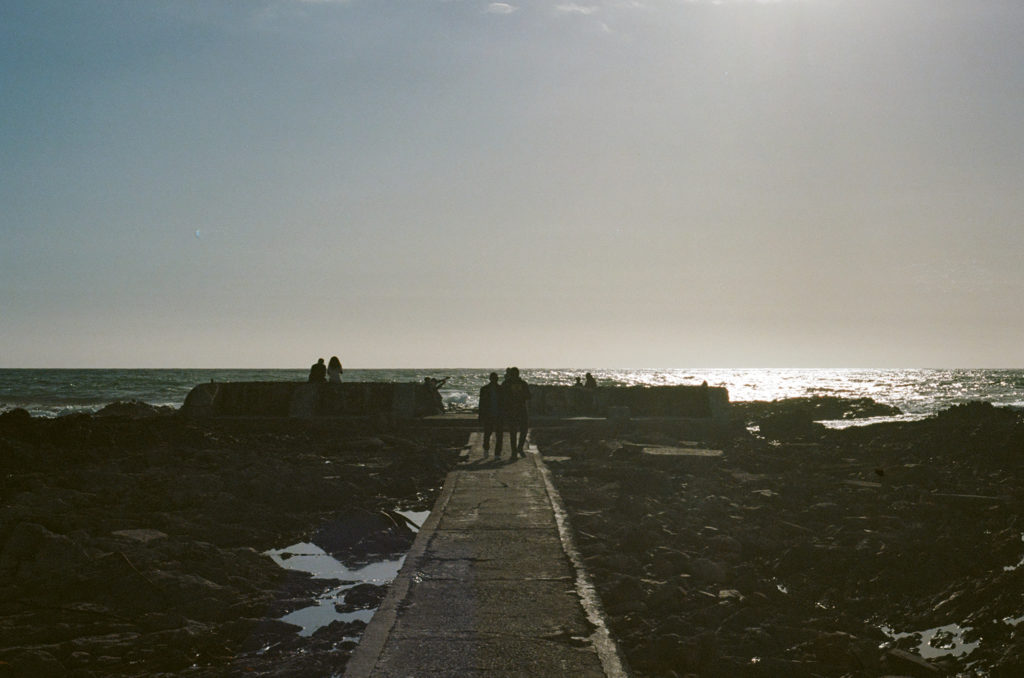
- Graaff's Pool in 2020.
- Interactive map of Graaff's Pool
- Type: tidal swimming pool
- Location: Sea Point, Cape Town
- Coordinates: 33.9124294°S 18.3873675°E
- Established: 1910 (116 years ago)
- Operator: City of Cape Town

Graaff's Pool is a public bathing area, tidal pool and notable landmark in the Cape Town neighbourhood of Sea Point, South Africa.

The pool was built by Pieter Marais in 1910. Marais, a businessman in the wine trade, built the pool for his paralysed wife who was bathed in the ocean daily. A tunnel was built from Marais' manor house, Bordeaux, under the public road to the pool so that his wife might be brought to the pool unseen by the public. The pool got its name when it was acquired by the business man and politician Jacobus Arnoldus Graaff who bequeathed the pool to the City of Cape Town.

For most of its history it was a men's only nude swimming pool. In the late 1980s through to the early 2000s the pool was known as a popular hangout for the city's gay community. Due to concerns with the location becoming a crime hot spot in the 1990s it was closed at sunset every night.

Prior to 2005, although publicly accessible the pool was walled off with only its western side open to the ocean thereby allowing bathers to swim in the nude. The high walls were demolished due to public concerns with the site being frequently used by prostitutes and their clients as well as for the sale of illicit street drugs.
