= GlenBridge Special School =

Glenbridge Special School and Resource Centre

Location
- Diep River; Cape Town, Western Cape, 7800; South Africa
- Coordinates: 34.034°S 18.465°E

Information
- Founded: 1957
- Status: open
- School board: Western Cape Education Department
- Principal: Denville Dawson
- Grades: 1–12
- Language: English

GlenBridge Special School and Resource Centre is an English medium Grade 1 – 12 public school in Cape Town, South Africa that offers remedial activities for children with intellectual impairments. Students here may have had accidents or they may have Foetal alcohol syndrome, Down syndrome or Williams syndrome in addition to other disabilities. GlenBridge is a member of Autism South Africa, an organisation which aims to improve the lives of people with autism.

== History ==
The school started as a private initiative in 1957 at Galway Road, Heathfield. The school was intended for severely disabled children and it became part of the Western Cape Education Department in 1981 and ten years later it was the first special school to be racially integrated. The school continued to expand and in January 2009 the school was opened at its new premises in the former Monterey Montessori Pre-school building on the Main Road in Diep River.

== Academics ==
=== International exchange ===
Glenbridge took part in a teacher exchange with Longcause Community Special School in Plymouth, England in 2009. Each school prepared special books before the chosen teachers took the books to the twinned school to exchange the information.

== Sports ==
The following sports are offered to learners at Glenbridge Special School.

=== Summer ===
- Swimming
- Cricket

=== Winter ===
- Netball
- Soccer
