= Karen Press =

South African poet

- Born: 1956 (age 69–70); Cape Town, South Africa
- Occupations: Poet, translator
- Known for: Co-founder of publishing collective Buchu Books
- Awards: South African Literary Award

Karen Press (born 1956) is a South African poet and translator.

She was born in Cape Town, and lives in Sea Point. Press is a full-time writer and editor, having published ten collections of poetry, a film script, short stories, as well as educational material and textbooks in the fields of science, mathematics, English and economics. She also translated poetry from Afrikaans, primarily work by Antjie Krog.

In 1987, she co-founded the publishing collective Buchu Books.

Antjie Krog described her poems in The Museum of Working Life as "a haunting museum constructed in Press's delicate tone and vivid poetic intelligence."

== Poetry ==
- Emergency Declarations (found poems, co-produced with Ingrid de Kok, 1985)
- This Winter Coming (Cinnamon Crocodile, 1986)
- Bird Heart Stoning the Sea (Buchu Books, 1990)
- History is the dispossession of the heart (Cinnamon Crocodile, 1992)
- The Coffee Shop Poems (Snailpress, 1993)
- Echo Location - a guide to Sea Point for residents and visitors (Gecko Books, 1998)
- Home (Carcanet, 2000)
- The Little Museum of Working Life (Deep South, 2004)
- The Canary’s Songbook (Carcanet, 2005)
- Slowly, As If (Carcanet, 2012)

== Awards ==
Press received the Literary Translators Award in the 2015 South African Literary Awards for translation of Mede-wete and Synapse by Antjie Krog.
