= Sea Point High School =

- Sea Point High School school crest

Location
- Main Road, Sea Point; Cape Town, Western Cape, 8005; South Africa; 33.9108°S 18.3932°E

Information
- School type: Public, high school
- Motto: Laborare est orare (To work is to pray)
- Religious affiliation: Christian
- Established: 21 April 1884
- Status: Open
- School district: District 4
- School number: 021 434 9141
- Principal: Leana le Breton
- Grades: 8–12
- Gender: Boys & Girls
- Age: 14 to 18
- Schedule: 07:30 - 15:00
- Campus: Urban Campus
- Colours: Black; Red; Yellow
- Accreditation: Western Cape Education Department
- Feeder schools: Sea Point Primary School

Sea Point High School, formerly Sea Point Boys' High School, is a co-educational public high school in Main Road, Sea Point, Cape Town, South Africa. The school was established in 1884. In 1925, the senior grades were separated from the junior grades. In 1989, the school merged with Ellerslie Girls' High School after becoming co-educational.

== Headmasters and principals ==
- George Hosking, B.A., 1884–1902
- J. Longwill, M.A., 1902–1904
- Thomas Young, M.A., 1904–1928
- C. H. Anderson, M.A., 1929–1938
- Ronald Graham, M.A., 1938–1947
- A. D. Dodd, M.A., M.Ed., 1947–1969
- H.M. Thomson, 1970 (acting)
- John Gibbon, 1971-
- Philip Gurney, 1996-1998
- Douglas Quick, 1998-2000
- Marina Kaichis, 2000-mid 2007
- C.B. Murison
- B. Probyn
- Mike Kessel
- Carder Tregonning, 2009-2012
- Pieter Botha, 2013 -2017
- Rondene Richards (acting) 2017-2019
- Leana Le Breton, 2019 (current)
- Lee Roy Saville, 2026 (acting) current

== Notable alumni ==
- Graham Armitage, British actor
- Gerry Brand – Springbok rugby player from 1928 to 1938
- Sir Ronald Harwood, CBE, FRSL – British author, playwright and screenwriter
- Sir Antony Sher, KBE – British actor, writer and theatre director
- Derek Miles Yellon – Medical researcher
