= Gerry Brand =

South African rugby union player

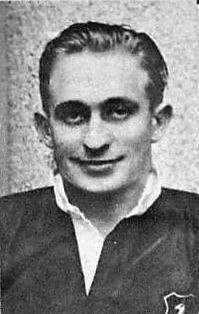
- Gerry Brand in 1937.
- Born: Gerhard Hamilton Brand; 8 October 1906 Cape Town, South Africa
- Died: 4 February 1996 (aged 89) Cape Town, South Africa
- Height: 1.78 m (5 ft 10 in)
- Weight: 73.9 kg (163 lb)
- School: Sea Point Boys High School, Cape Town
- Occupation(s): Estate agent, Businessman

Rugby union career
- Position(s): Full-back and Wing
Amateur team(s)
Years	Team	Apps	(Points)
- Hamiltons RFC
Provincial / State sides
Years	Team	Apps	(Points)
1927–45	Western Province	35	
- Correct as of 13 December 2013
International career
Years	Team	Apps	(Points)
1928–38	South Africa	16	(55)
- Correct as of 13 December 2013

Gerhard Hamilton Brand (8 October 1906 – 4 February 1996) was a Springbok rugby union footballer who played in 16 tests between 1928 and 1938. Brand has been described as the best kicker of his era, as well as a "magnificent defensive player" with a "wonderful tackle". According to Guinness World Records he executed the longest drop goal in rugby union to date. Brand's 55 test career points for the Springboks set a 27-year record (1938–65), which was eventually surpassed by Keith Oxlee.

== Early life ==
Gerhard Hamilton Brand received his second name for the Hamilton Rugby Football Club in Sea Point, Cape Town, which had won the Western Province Rugby Football Union's 1906 Grand Challenge Cup club competition two days before his birth. He grew up in Sea Point and learnt rugby from the age of 8.

He attended Sea Point Boys High School, and as a young man played scrum-half for Hamiltons, whose name he carried. He was an introvert, according to his friend, Danie Craven. In 1936 Brand helped Hamiltons win the provincial championship, a feat the club did not repeat for the next 73 years. The club instituted the Gerry Brand trophy for best full-back which was awarded to a Hamiltonian annually.

During the rugby off-season Brand and his fellow Hamilton players supported and played for the local baseball team, the Sea Point Cardinals. A 1934 Australian newspaper described Brand as an accomplished baseball player, and he did attain provincial colours in that sport. The newspaper speculated that Brand could be chosen for a proposed exchange of baseball tours between South Africa and Japan.

== Rugby career ==
=== Provincial career ===
Brand was first selected to play for Western Province in 1927, the year that his team won the Currie Cup championships. He would turn out for Province until he was 38 years old. Along the way Brand scored 24 points in a match against South Western Districts, a record for a provincial game that stood until 1950, when it was surpassed by Basie Viviers. In 1934 Brand established a Currie Cup series record of 70 points in 6 matches – 67 points from kicks and 3 points from a solitary try.

In 1945 Brand played his last match for the Western Province before retiring from rugby.

=== International career ===
In 1928 Brand made his debut for the Springboks on the wing against New Zealand, and played in two tests that year.

Brand was also selected for Bennie Osler's Springbok touring party to the United Kingdom and Ireland in 1931–32. He played in 18 of the 26 tour matches, scoring 72 points in total. In the test against England on 2 January 1932 Brand caught the ball close to the halfway line and against the touch line. Steadying himself, he calmly dropped a goal which travelled 77.7 m (254 ft 11 in) from point of impact to where it landed in the stands. The kick was the highlight of an otherwise dour match and helped Brand's team to a 7–0 victory. His drop goal was later described as "probably the best drop goal ever seen at Twickenham".

Brand was appointed captain of the Western Province team in 1932. During 1933 he played in all five tests against the visiting Wallabies of 1933.

He was part of the 1937 Springbok tour to Australasia, during which he scored 90 points in seven matches – a record that stood for 56 years. His 209 points in all for the tour became another long-standing record. Brand kicked 69 conversions, which continues to be the record for most conversions on a Springbok tour. The team lost only two matches and was regarded as the unofficial world rugby champions. Brand and his 1937 teammates remain the only Springbok team so far "to win a full test series on New Zealand soil".

On their 1938 tour to South Africa the British and Irish Lions encountered Brand in three defeats. He captained the Western Province Town and Country XV which handed the Lions their first defeat on tour. Brand's wide-angled kick during the dying minutes of the game propelled his team to an 11–8 victory. At Cape Town's Newlands Stadium Brand led the Western Province to a 21–11 triumph to which he contributed nine points.

His name was among the first listed for the Springboks for the first test at Ellis Park Stadium in Johannesburg. A record crowd of 36,000 watched Brand kick 14 points (4 conversions and 2 penalties) in the Springboks' 26–12 defeat of the Lions. The kicking contest between Brand and the Lions full-back, Vivian Jenkins, produced "two of the most remarkable goals ever kicked in rugby football". Jenkins succeeded with a 63-yard penalty kick, taken 8 yards inside his team's half of the field. Not to be outdone, Brand drop-kicked a 60-yard penalty from almost exactly the same place as his famous Twickenham kick.

The test against the Lions proved to be Brand's last international game, as he picked up a recurring thigh injury during preparations for the second test. In all he turned out in 46 matches for the Springboks, scoring 293 points – a record only surpassed in the 1990s by the Springbok fly-half Naas Botha. Brand's tally still placed him 6th on the 2013 list of most points scored in all Springbok matches.

Danie Craven said of Brand: "I regard him, along with Bennie Osler, as a legend among legends – an unforgettable Springbok".

== Personal life ==
Brand was appointed a national selector in the 1960s and owned a filling station in Bloemfontein. Later he lived in Fish Hoek outside Cape Town, and suffered a light stroke in 1987.

== International statistics ==
Brand played in 16 tests for the Springboks during which he scored 55 points. He was renowned for never missing an important kick.

=== Summary ===
Team	Matches	Won	Draw	Lost	Tries	Con	Pen	Drop	Points	P/M	%Won
South Africa – Test matches	16	14	0	2	0	13	7	2	55	3.44	87.5
South Africa – Tour matches	30	na	na	na	2	87	18	1	238	7.93	na

=== Test match record ===
No	Opponents	Results (SA 1st)	Position	Points	Dates	Venue
1.	New Zealand	7–6	Wing		21 Jul 1928	Ellis Park, Johannesburg
2.	New Zealand	11–6	Wing		18 Aug 1928	Crusaders Ground, Port Elizabeth
3.	Wales	8–3	Full-back		5 Des 1931	St Helen's, Swansea
4.	Ireland	8–3	Full-back		19 Dec 1931	Lansdowne Road, Dublin
5.	England	7–0	Full-back	4 (1 drop)	2 Jan 1932	Twickenham, London
6.	Scotland	6–3	Full-back		19 Jan 1932	Murrayfield, Edinburgh
7.	Australia	17–3	Full-back	5 (1 penalty & 1 conversion)	8 Jul 1933	Newlands Stadium, Cape Town
8.	Australia	6–21	Full-back	3 (1 penalty)	22 Jul 1933	Kingsmead, Durban
9.	Australia	12–3	Full-back	2 (1 conversion)	12 Aug 1933	Ellis Park, Johannesburg
10.	Australia	11–0	Wing	3 (1 penalty)	26 Aug 1933	Crusaders Ground, Port Elizabeth
11.	Australia	4–15	Wing	4 (1 drop)	2 Sep 1933	Springbok Park, Bloemfontein
12.	Australia	9–3	Full-back	3 (1 penalty)	26 Jun 1937	Sydney Cricket Ground
13.	Australia	26–17	Full-back	8 (4 conversions)	17 Jul 1937	Sydney Cricket Ground
14.	New Zealand	13–6	Full-back	7 (1 penalty & 2 conversions)	4 Sep 1937	Lancaster Park, Christchurch
15.	New Zealand	17–6	Full-back	2 (1 conversion)	25 Sep 1937	Eden Park, Auckland
16.	(United Kingdom) British Isles	26–12	Full-back	14 (2 penalties & 4 conversions)	6 Aug 1938	Ellis Park, Johannesburg

Legend: try (3 pts); pen = penalty (3 pts.); conv = conversion (2 pts.), drop = drop kick (4 pts.).
