= Cape Town French School =

French international school in Cape Town, South Africa

- École française du Cap "François Le Vaillant"

Location
- Lycée: 101, Hope Street - Gardens 8001 Cape Town South Africa; Primary: Corner Tramway and Kings road - Sea Point 8005 Cape Town South Africa; Cape Town, Western Cape, 8001; South Africa; 33.92342°S 18.3817679°E; Kings Road, Sea Point 33.93171°S 18.41850°E; 101, Hope Street, Gardens

Information
- School type: International Private Co-educational
- Established: 1987
- Status: Open
- Principal: Samuel Jourdan
- Staff: 9
- Teaching staff: 54
- Grades: 1–12
- Enrollment: 500
- Average class size: 20
- Classes offered: French, Mathematics, History and Geography, Economics & Social Sciences, Life & Earth Sciences, Digital Science and Technology, First foreign language, Second foreign language and Physical Education
- Language: French, English
- Schedule type: Traditional/Fixed Schedule
- Hours in school day: 6-10 hours
- Classrooms: 31
- Sports: Football, Ping Pong, Running, Basketball, Gymnastics
- Website: ecolefrancaiseducap.co.za

The Cape Town French School (French: Lycée Français du Cap) or the François Le Vaillant French School (French: École française du Cap "François Le Vaillant") is a French international school in Cape Town, South Africa.

It has two campuses, the primary school, within the former primary school building of Tafelberg Remedial School in Sea Point, and the Lycée Français du Cap, which includes senior high school, in Gardens.

As of 2015 about 41% of the students are not French. Of the overall number of students, 25% are South African.

It directly teaches until seconde (first year of lycée), then uses CNED for première (second year of lycée).

== History ==
The school was initiated in 1985 by a group of French citizens living in Cape Town who sought to provide their children with a French curriculum. It was formally established in 1987 after securing suitable premises.

In 2013, the school relocated to its current premises on Kings Road in Sea Point following an 18-million rand renovation. The building, formerly occupied by Tafelberg Remedial School, had stood vacant since 2010 and was acquired through a public tender process administered by the Western Cape government, the property’s owner. After the school’s successful bid, the site was redeveloped to house its new campus.

From 2021 until 2026, the director of the school was Samuel Jourdan. On April 30 2026 he was elevated to the rank of Officer in the Order of Academic Palmes. His actions were reflected in a positive growth of the school and marked a new beginning of French education in South Africa with the search of a brand new campus.

== Curriculum ==
In some classes, instruction may use both French and English as mediums. Classes on the instruction of the English language and some other subjects may be fully English medium. The school has German and Spanish as subjects for foreign languages.

Students are eligible to take the British International Section, Cambridge examinations and the Baccalauréat Français International (BFI) examinations.
