= Sea Point =

- Suburb of Cape Town
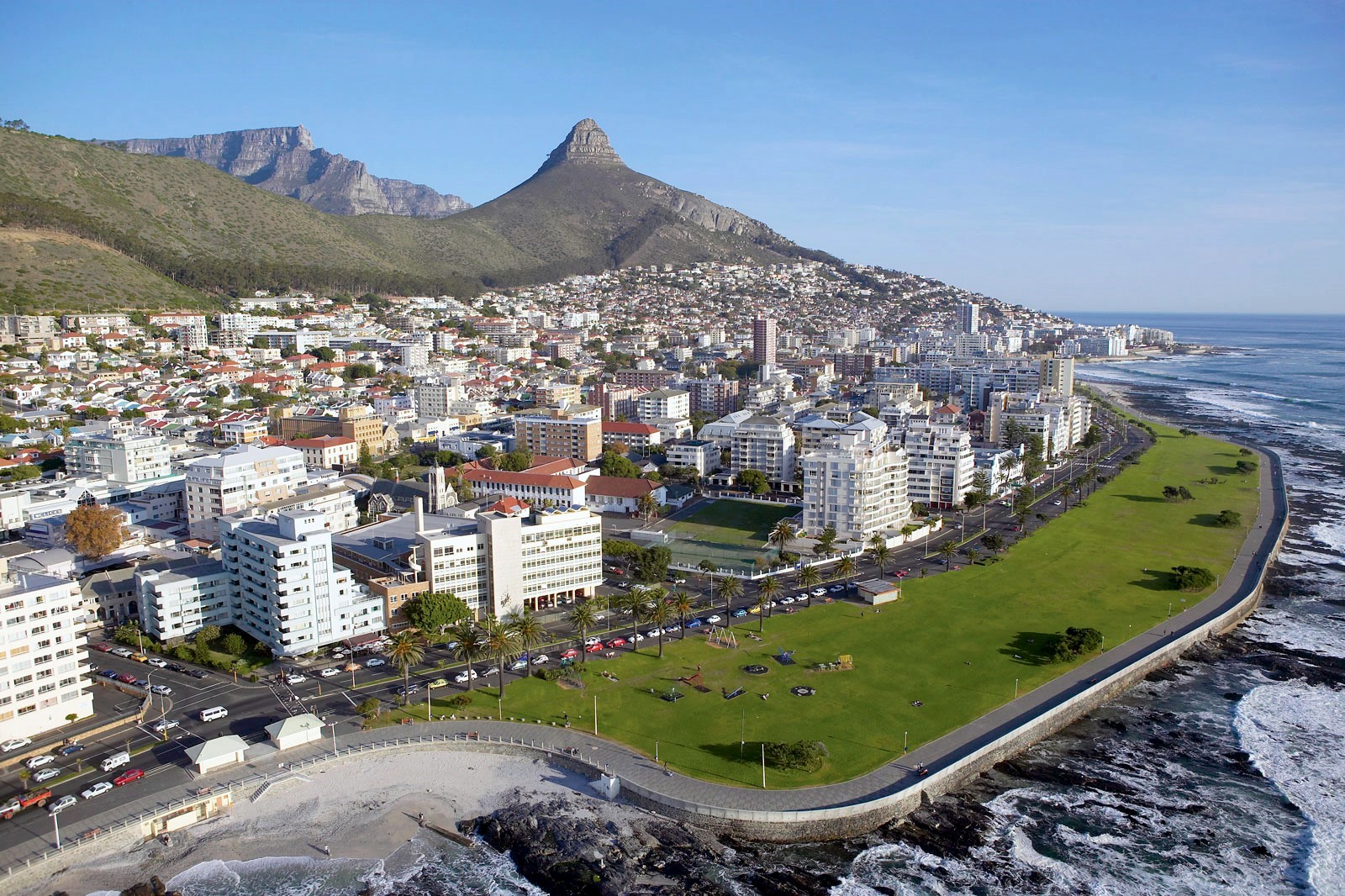
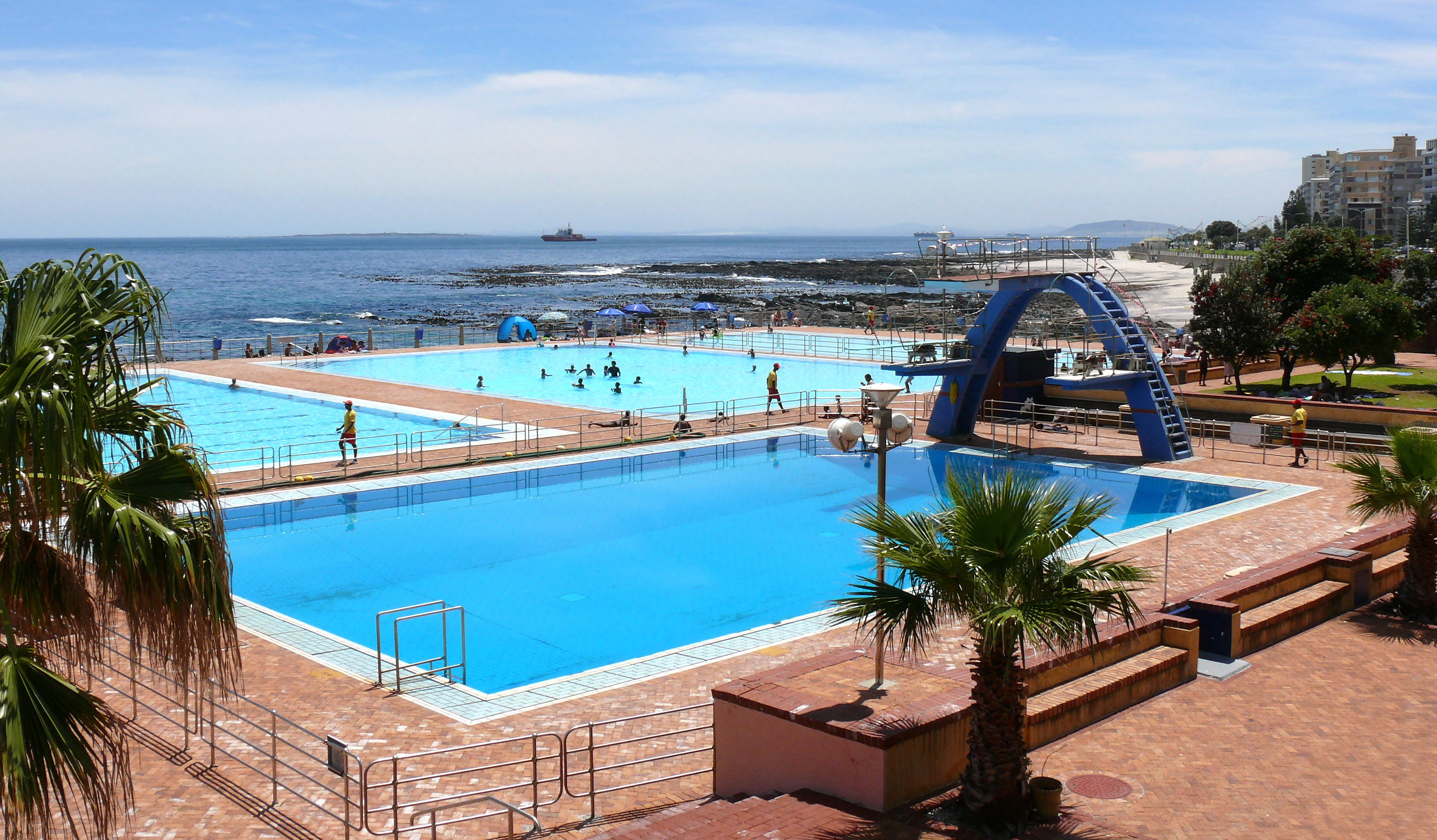
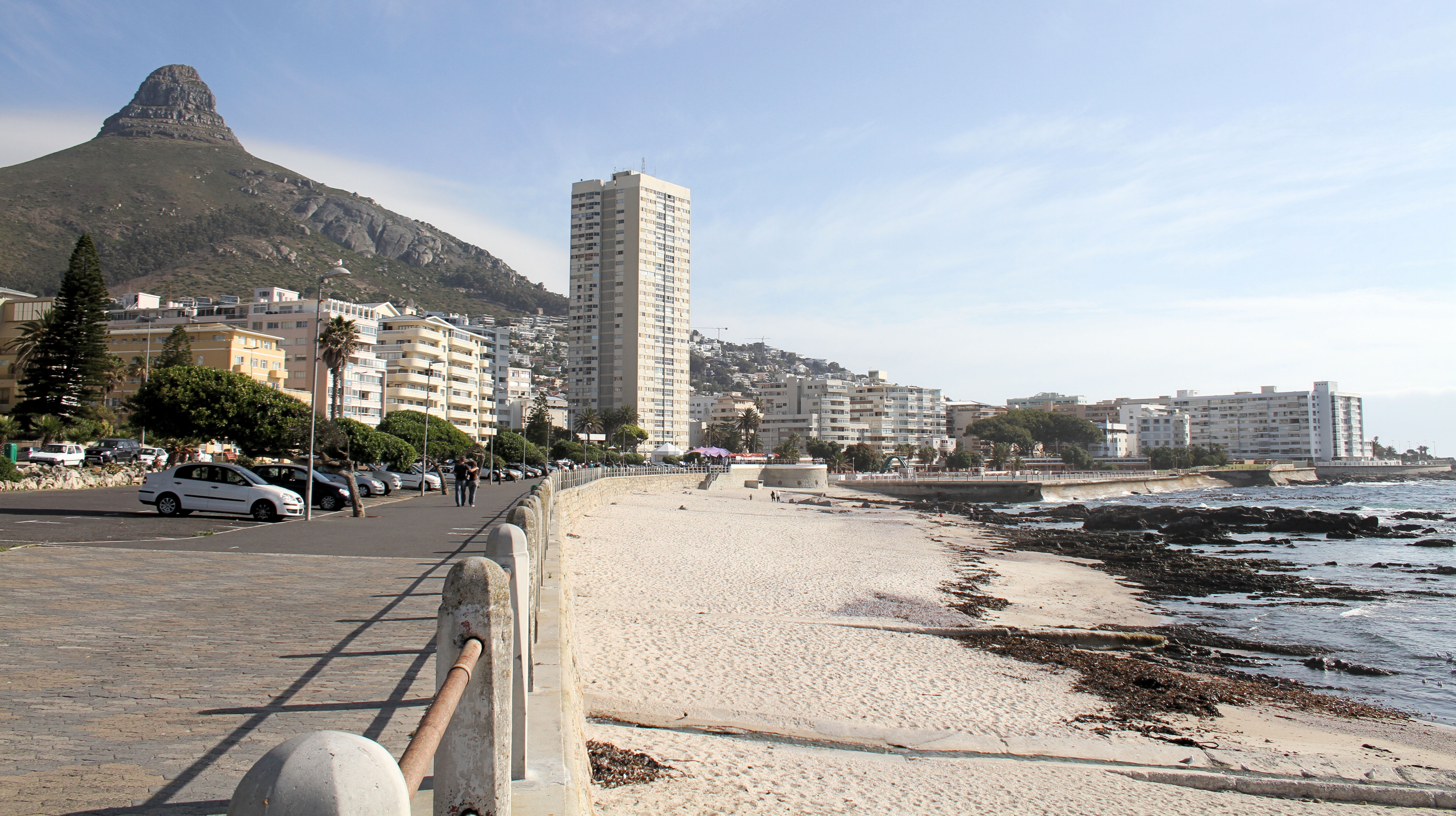
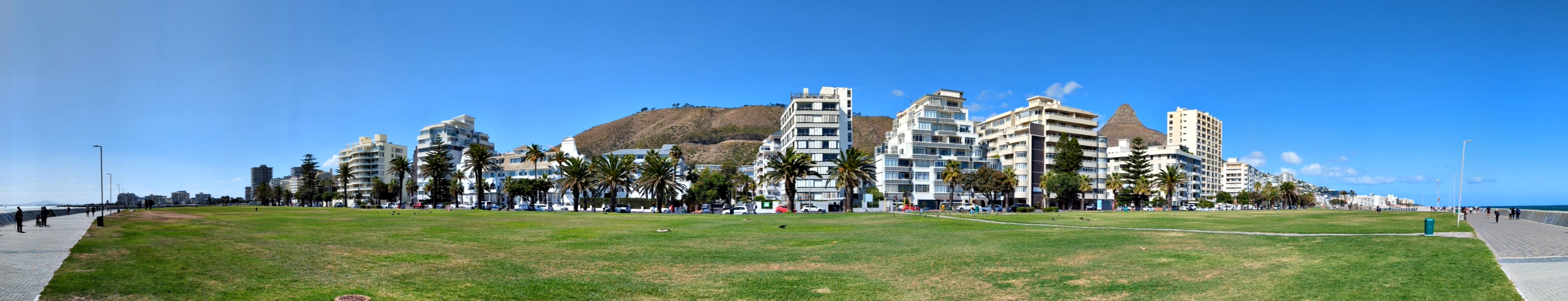
- Clockwise from top: Aerial View of Sea Point, The Sea Point Pavilion swimming pool, view from Sea Point promenade, Sea Point beach front with Lion's Head as a backdrop.
- Interactive map of Sea Point
- Coordinates: 33°54′55″S 18°23′33″E
- Country: South Africa
- Province: Western Cape
- Municipality: City of Cape Town
- Main Place: Cape Town

Government
  - Councillor: Nicola Jowell (Democratic Alliance)

Area
  - Total: 1.58 km^{2} (0.61 sq mi)

Population (2011)
  - Total: 13,332
  - Density: 8,440/km^{2} (21,900/sq mi)

Racial makeup (2011)
  - Black African: 18.0%
  - Coloured: 7.7%
  - Indian/Asian: 2.8%
  - White: 67.5%
  - Other: 4.1%

First languages (2011)
  - English: 68.6%
  - Afrikaans: 13.3%
  - Xhosa: 3.6%
  - Other: 14.5%
- Time zone: UTC+2 (SAST)
- Postal code (street): 8005
- PO box: 8060
- Area code: 021

Sea Point (Afrikaans: Seepunt) is a densely populated suburb of Cape Town, situated in the Western Cape, between Signal Hill and the Atlantic Ocean, a few kilometres to the west of Cape Town's Central Business District (CBD). Moving from Sea Point to the CBD, one passes first through the small suburb of Three Anchor Bay, then Green Point. Seaward from Green Point is the area known as Mouille Point (pronounced "mu-lee"), where the local lighthouse is situated. It borders to the southwest the suburb of Bantry Bay.

During the apartheid era, it was classed as a "whites only" area under the terms of the Group Areas Act. Since the repeal of the Act in 1991, the resident-mix has become more cosmopolitan, albeit with white residents remaining the largest population group. It has for several decades been considered Cape Town's "Jewish hub", as it is home to a significant Jewish population, synagogues and Kosher restaurants and Jewish delis.

In the 1970s it became known as "Little Manhattan", with its cosmopolitan entertainment and dining offer, and the revolving restaurant at the Ritz Hotel. It went through a period of decline in the 1990s and 2000s as businesses and foot traffic were redirected to the V&A Waterfront. In more recent years it has attracted significant investment in its property sector and revitalisation of its commercial precinct. It was named by Time Out magazine as "one of the coolest neighbourhoods in the world" in 2022 and 2023.

Sea Point forms part of Ward 54 in The City Of Cape Town, and is represented by Democratic Alliance councillor Nicola Jowell.

The ratepayers, residents and local businesses in the area are represented by the Sea Point, Fresnaye & Bantry Bay Ratepayers and Residents Association (SFB), a volunteer-led organization financed by donations and memberships. The SFB's mandate includes defending the heritage of the area, construction applications, providing added security and cleansing above what is provided by the City and State, and communications with residents and ratepayers, as well as on behalf of these parties with stakeholders such as the City of Cape Town.

== History ==
Some of the first settlers in the area were the aristocratic Protestant Le Sueur family from Bayeux in Normandy. François Le Sueur arrived in 1739 as spiritual advisor to Cape Governor Hendrik Swellengrebel. The family's Cape estate, Winterslust, originally covered 81 hectares (200 acres) on the slopes of Signal Hill. The estate was later named Fresnaye, and now forms part of the suburbs of Sea Point and Fresnaye.

Sea Point got its name in 1767 when one of the commanders serving under Captain Cook, Sam Wallis, encamped his men in the area to avoid a smallpox epidemic in Cape Town at the time. It grew as a residential suburb in the early 1800s, and in 1839 was merged into a single municipality with neighbouring Green Point. The 1875 census indicated that Sea Point and Green Point jointly had a population of 1,425. By 1904 it stood at 8,839.

With the 1862 opening of the Sea Point tramline, the area became Cape Town's first "commuter suburb", though the line linked initially to Camps Bay. At the turn of the century, the tramline was augmented by the Metropolitan and Suburban Railway Company, which added a line to the City Centre.

During the 1800s, Sea Point's development was dominated by the influence of its most famous resident, the liberal parliamentarian and MP for Cape Town, Saul Solomon. Solomon was both the founder of the Cape Argus and the most influential liberal in the country—constantly fighting racial inequality in the Cape. His Round Church (St John's) of 1878 reflected his syncretic approach to religion—housing four different religions in its walls, which were rounded to avoid "denominational corners". "Solomon's Temple", as it was humorously known by residents, stood on its triangular traffic island at the intersection of Main, Regent, and Kloof roads, a centre of the Sea Point community, until it was destroyed by the city council in the 1930s.

Ships entering the harbour in Table Bay from the east coast of Africa have to round the coast at Sea Point and over the years many of them have been wrecked on the reefs just off-shore. In May 1954, during a great storm, the Basuto Coast (246 tonnes) ended up on the rocks within a few metres of the concrete wall of the promenade. A fireman who came to the assistance of the crew was swept off the wall of the swimming pool adjacent to the promenade by waves and was never seen again. The vessel was soon thereafter salvaged for scrap. In July 1966 a large cargo ship, the S.A. Seafarer, was stranded on the rocks only a couple of hundred metres from the Three Anchor Bay beach. The stranding was the cause of one of Cape Town's earliest great environmental scares, owing to the cargo including drums of tetramethyl lead and tetraethyl lead, volatile and highly toxic compounds that in those days were added to motor fuels as an anti-knocking agent. The ship was gradually destroyed by the huge swells that habitually roll in from the south Atlantic. Salvage from the ship can still be found in local antique shops.

The area was historically classed as a "whites only" area only during the apartheid era under the terms of the Group Areas Act, a series of South African laws that restricted urban areas according to racial classifications. Some black and coloured residents continued to live in pockets of the suburb during this era. The Twin Towers on Beach Road were built in the context of a "white housing crisis" in racially segregated Cape Town in the 1960s and 1970s. In the 1970s the National Party initiated several planning interventions, including the suspension of the city's zoning rules with regards to building height for developers willing to build housing in white Group Areas.

In the early 1970s, the iconic 23-storey Ritz Hotel was built in Sea Point, with a revolving restaurant. Prior to the development of the V&A Waterfront, Sea Point was known as a "tiny Manhattan by the sea", known for its restaurants and entertainment.

In the mid to late 1990s, the area experienced a rise in crime as drug dealers and prostitutes moved into the area. However, due to the aggressive adoption of broken windows municipal management spearheaded by then area councillor Jean-Pierre Smith, the crime rate declined throughout most of the 2000s. On the morning of 20 January 2003, nine men were killed in a brutal attack at the Sizzler's massage parlour in Sea Point.

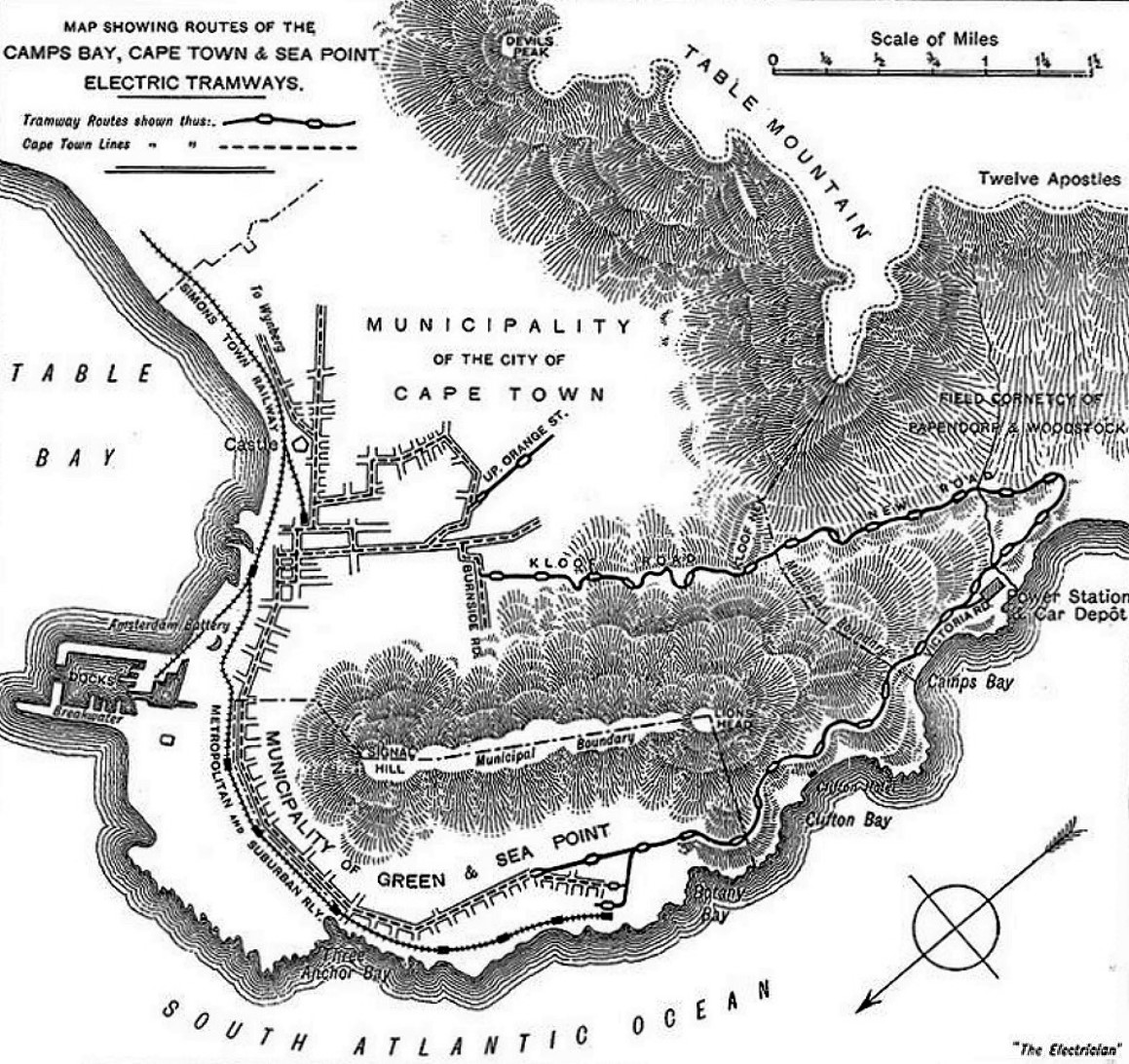
Early map of Sea Point and its infrastructure, c. 1906

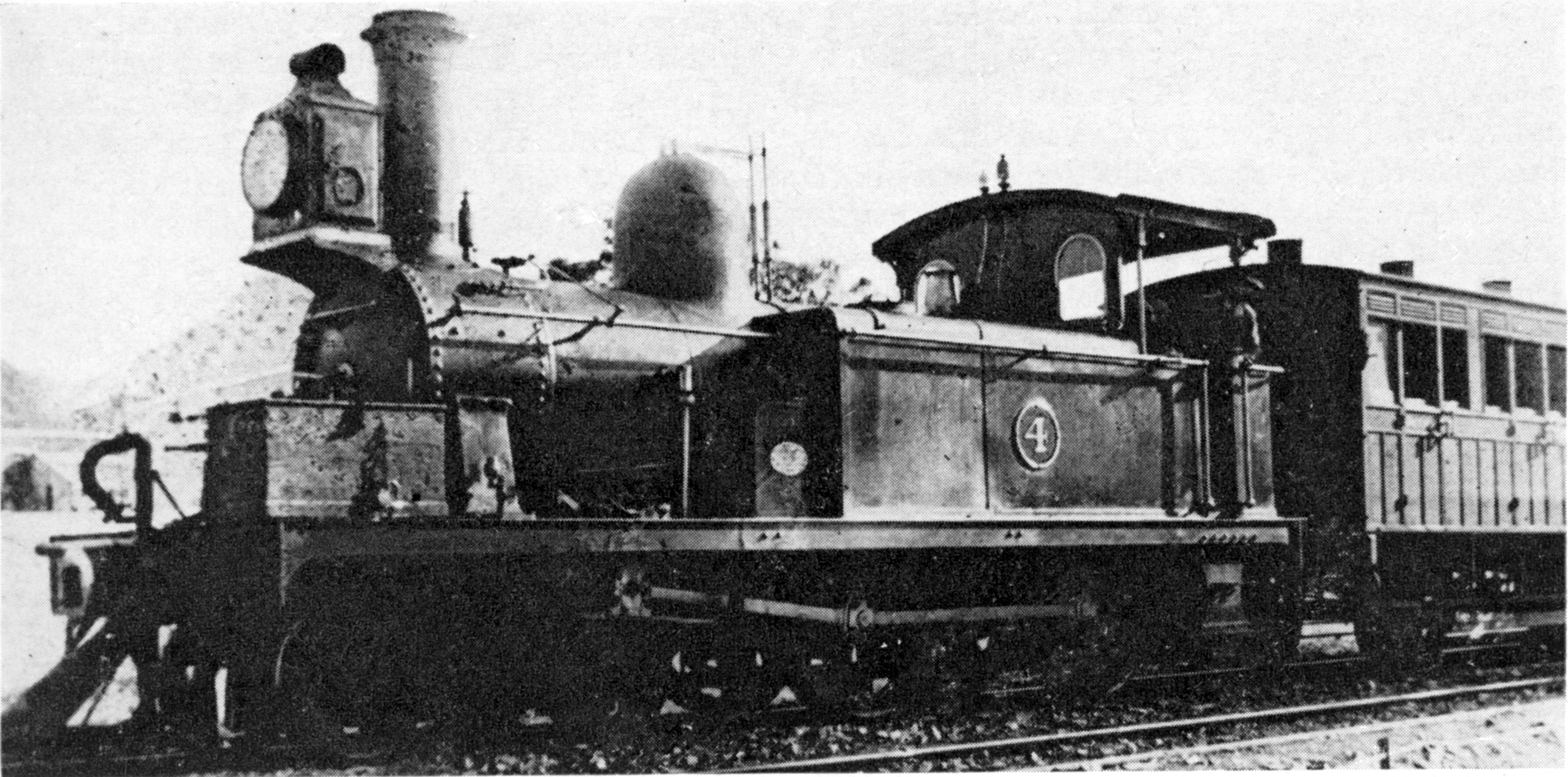
Cape 1st Class (4-4-0T) 1875 no. 4

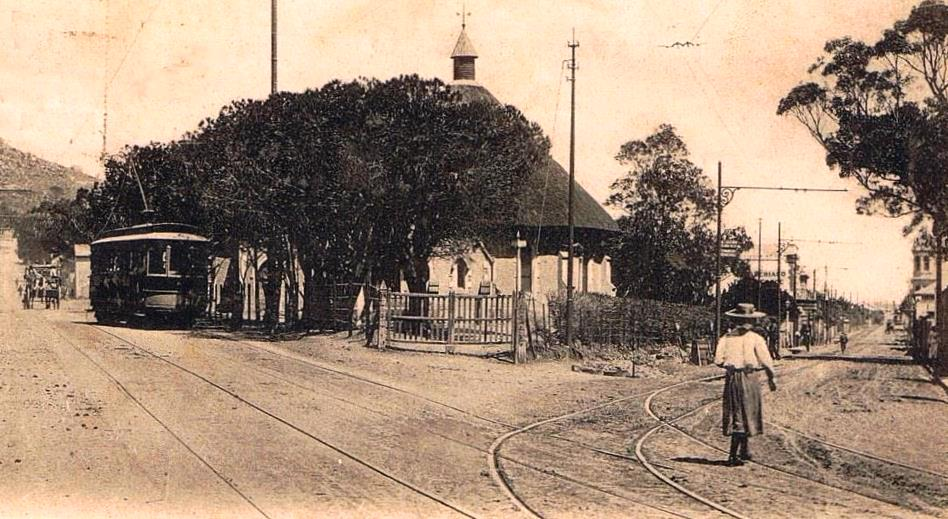
Round Church or Solomons Temple, 1906

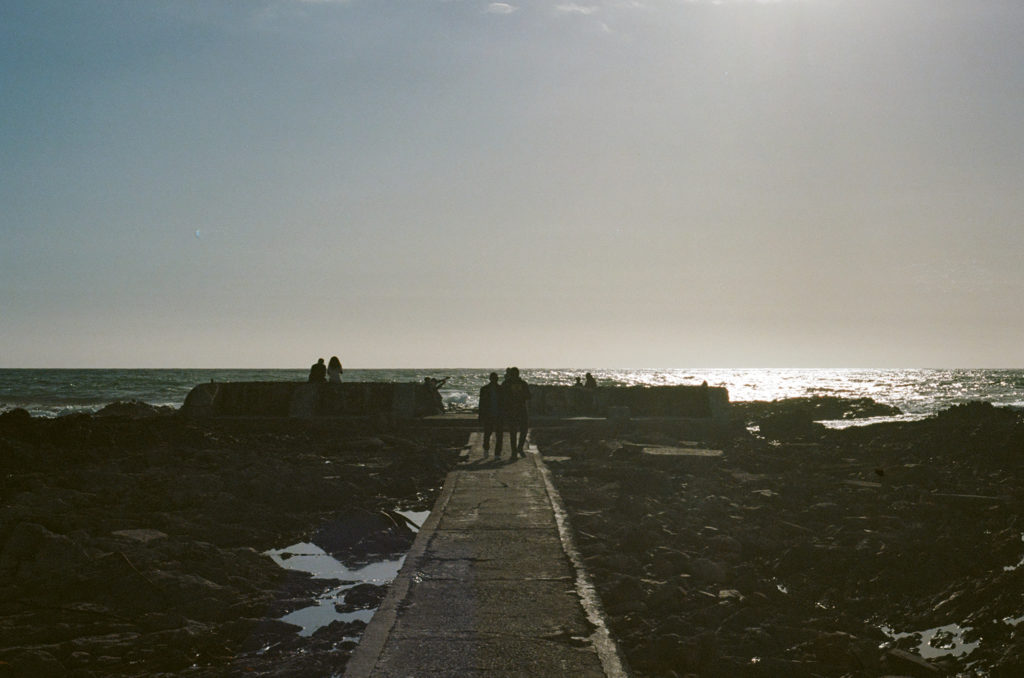
Graaff's Pool in 2020, shot on Kodak Ektar 100

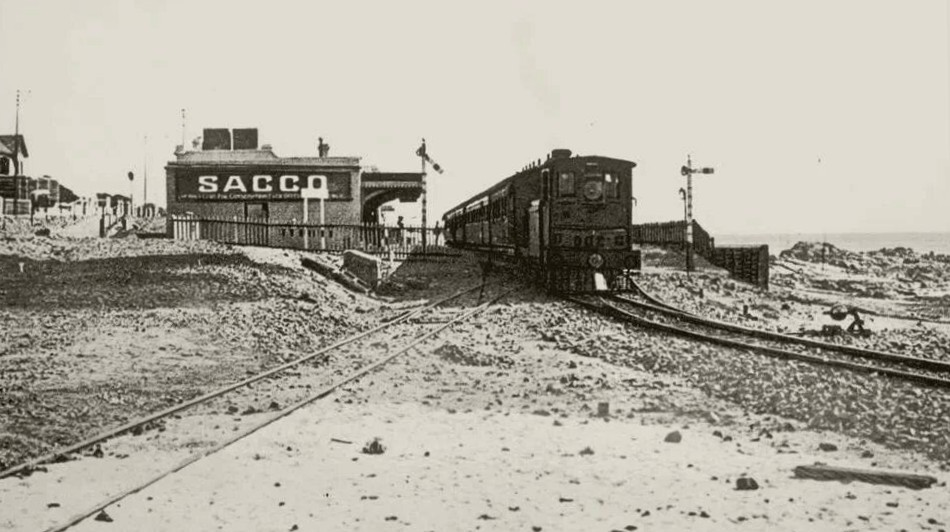
Sea Point station in 1910

== Layout ==
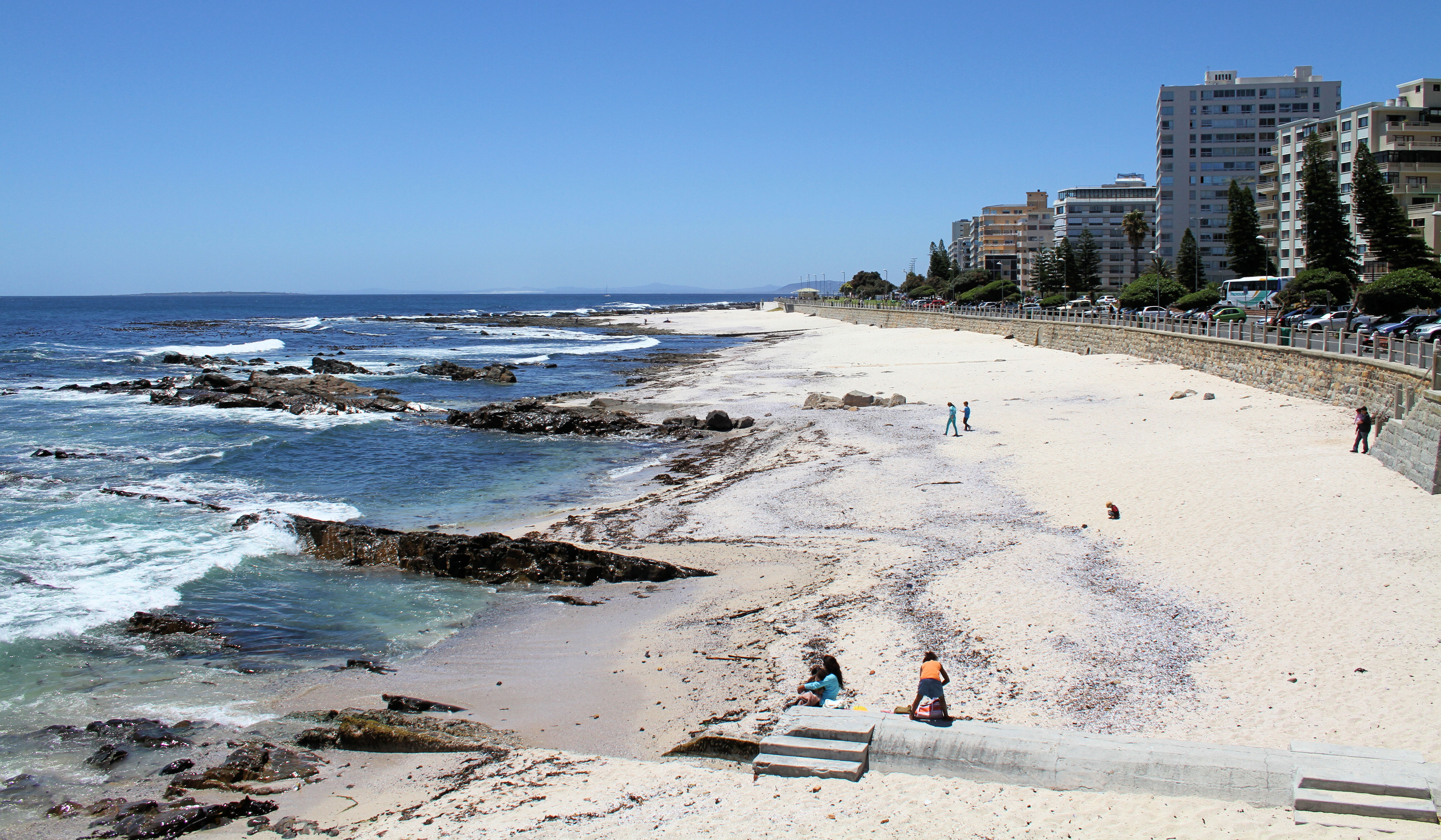
Sea Point beach with the beach front promenade

Sea Point is a suburb of Cape Town and is situated on a narrow stretch of land between Cape Town's well known Lion's Head to the southeast and the Atlantic Ocean to the northwest. It is a high-density area where houses are built in close proximity to one another toward the surrounding mountainside. Apartment buildings are more common in the central area and toward the beachfront. An important communal space is the beachfront promenade, a paved walkway along the beachfront used for strolling, jogging, or socialising. Along the litoral of the Sea Point promenade, the coastline has varied characteristics. Some parts are rocky and difficult to access, while other parts have broad beaches. Sea Point beach adjoins an Olympic-sized seawater swimming pool, which has served generations of Capetonians since at least the early 1950s. Further toward the city is a beach known as Rocklands.

Adjoining Sea Point is Three Anchor Bay. The beaches along this stretch are in the main covered with mussel shells tossed up by the surf, unlike the beaches of Clifton and Camps Bay, which are sandy. The rocks off the beaches at Sea Point are in large part late Precambrian metamorphic rocks of the Malmesbury formation, formed by low-grade metamorphism of fine-grained sediments. The site is internationally famous in the history of geology. A plaque on the rocks commemorates Charles Darwin's observation of the rare geological interface, where granite, an igneous rock, has invaded, absorbed, and replaced the Malmesbury formation rocks. There are extensive beds of kelp offshore. Compared to the False Bay side of the Cape Peninsula, the water is colder (11–16 °C).

Graaff's Pool, a beachfront tidal pool partially demolished in 2005, was the subject of a short film entitled "Behind the Wall", which contrasted the pool's origin story of Lady Marais, paralysed from the waist down from childbirth, whose husband built the pool for her as a private bathing area in the 1930s, and the Sea Point gay scene, which adopted the pool as a cruising ground between the 1960s and the 2000s.

== Transportation ==
The suburb is served by the MyCiTi bus rapid transit system. The 108 and 109 services take passengers to Hout Bay, V&A Waterfront and Adderley Street in downtown Cape Town.

== Houses of worship ==
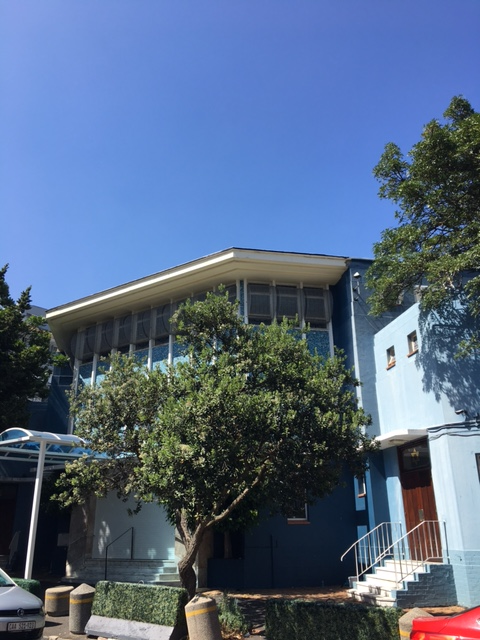
Marais Road Shul

=== Jewish congregations ===
- The Marais Road Shul, formally known as the Green & Sea Point Hebrew Congregation, Orthodox Jewish congregation on Marais Road, in 1994 it had the largest Jewish congregation in the Southern Hemisphere
- Beit Midrash Morasha, an Orthodox Jewish congregation on Arthur's Road
- Ohr Somayach, Orthodox Jewish congregation on St John's Road and branch of Ohr Somayach, Jerusalem with a Baal teshuva tradition
- Sephardi Hebrew Congregation, Orthodox Jewish congregation on Regent's Road with a Sephardi tradition
- Chabad Centre of Cape Town, Orthodox Jewish congregation on St John's Road

Reform Jews living in the area are served by Temple Israel, an affiliate of the South African Union for Progressive Judaism, on Upper Portswood Road in neighbouring Green Point

=== Christian congregations ===
- Common Ground Church Sea Point meets at the same venue as Sea Point Congregational Church, a Christian church at the corner of Main Road and Marais Road
- Joshua Generation Church Sea Point, an Evangelical church that meets at Sea Point High School at 5 Norfolk Road
- Life Church (part of the Assemblies of God movement), an Evangelical church on Main Road
- Sea Point Evangelical Congregational Church, an Evangelical church on Main Road
- Sea Point Methodist Church, a Methodist church on Main Road
- Church of the Holy Redeemer, an Anglican church on Kloof Road
- St James the Great Anglican Church, an Anglican church on St James Road
- New Apostolic Church Sea Point, a New Apostolic church on Marais Road
- Our Lady of Good Hope Catholic Church (formerly St Francis Church), a Catholic church on the corner of St Andrews Road and Beach Road

== Education ==
Schools in the area include Sea Point Primary School and Sea Point High School (formerly Sea Point Boys' High School) founded in 1884, and Herzlia Weizmann Primary. The French School of Cape Town opened on 14 October 2014 after an R18m upgrade of the primary school of the old Tafelberg Remedial School's campus. The primary school campus of the French school is in Sea Point.

== In popular culture ==
- Life & Times of Michael K, a 1983 novel by J. M. Coetzee begins and ends in Sea Point.
- Ah, but Your Land Is Beautiful, a 1983 novel by Alan Paton includes a description of Sea Point: "We are talking of fighting an election in Sea Point. It is probably one of the most favourable constituencies from our point of view, fairly affluent people with guilty consciences, a high percentage of Jewish voters, and a large number of retired business and professional men. There is probably a higher percentage of voters opposed to racial discrimination than anywhere else in South Africa."
- Sea Point Days, a 2008 documentary film directed by François Verster

== Notable people ==
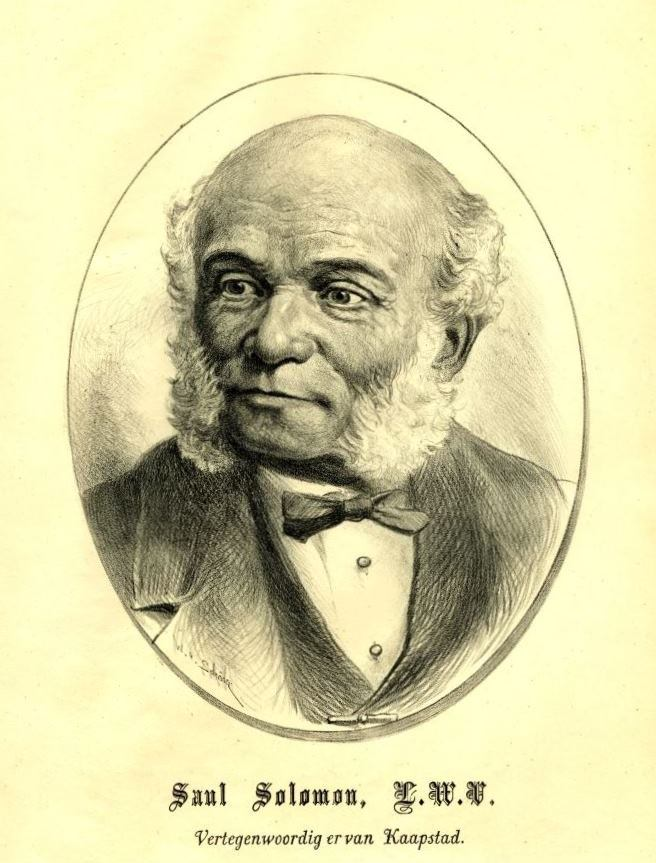
Saul Solomon, Cape Town politician who resided in Sea Point for most of his life during the late 1800s.

- David Bloomberg, mayor of Cape Town
- Gerry Brand, Springboks rugby union footballer
- Darrel Bristow-Bovey, writer
- Arno Carstens singer-songwriter
- Colin Eglin, politician
- Jacobus Arnoldus Graaff, businessman and politician, bequeathed Graaff's Pool to the people of Cape Town
- Sally Little, professional golfer.
- Bob Newson, cricketer
- Karen Press, poet
- David Rosen, fashion designer and artist
- Wilf Rosenberg, rugby player
- Anthony Sher, actor and writer
- Louise Smit writer of popular South African television shows, Wielie Walie and Haas Das
- Saul Solomon, liberal Cape politician
- Katie Stuart (reformer) (1862-1925), President, Sea Point Woman's Christian Temperance Union
- John Whitmore, surfer, surfboard shaper, radio presenter, Springbok surfing team manager

== Coat of arms ==
The Green and Sea Point municipal council assumed a coat of arms in 1901. The shield was divided vertically, one half depicting signal masts on Signal Hill, the other a golden lion's head, shoulders and forepaws; in the centre, near the top, was a small blue shield displaying three anchors. An imperial crown was placed above the shield. The coat of arms has been incorporated into the emblem of the Metropolitan Golf Club

== As a public gatherings venue ==
The Sea Point Promenade is regularly used as a location for public gatherings, community events, charity activities, and demonstrations.

=== Pride and LGBT events ===
Cape Town Pride activities regularly extend into the Sea Point area, in particular the annual "Pets for Pride" promenade walk for pet owners, which is included in the official Cape Town Pride calendar. Cape Town Pride focuses on raising LGBTQI+ awareness and supporting greater equality and inclusion.

=== Charity and disability-awareness events ===
The non-profit Things on Wheels hosts its annual 5-km Wheel Walk along the Sea Point Promenade every March or April, routinely drawing around 200–250 wheelchair users and community volunteers.

=== Public demonstrations ===
Solidarity marches and political gatherings are known to take place on the Sea Point Promenade, particularly during the mid-2020s.

Demonstrations linked to the Israel–Gaza war have taken place on the Sea Point Promenade since 2023. South African Christian church groups have held peaceful "prayer rallies" to show solidarity with Israel following the October 7 Hamas attacks on Israel, while pro-Palestinian demonstrators have held protests calling to "globalise the intifada" in support of the Palestinian cause. Some of these events have resulted in clashes, police intervention, and arrests by the South African Police Service (SAPS), prompting calls from Cape Town officials to maintain peaceful and lawful assemblies.

The Sea Point Promenade has also been used for demonstrations and awareness campaigns relating to gender-based violence (GBV). In 2025, thousands of protesters dressed in black gathered at Sea Point during an anti-GBV demonstration held as part of a nationwide South African day of protest against violence against women.
