= Afri Twin =

International school linking initiative

- Formation: 2001
- Founder: Jayne Martin
- Headquarters: Cape Town
- Key people: Jayne Martin (Cape Town); Sandy Agar (London)
- Website: www.afritwin.net

Afri Twin is an international school linking initiative that facilitates mutually beneficial partnerships between students and teachers at schools in the United Kingdom and South Africa. It was founded in 2001 by Jayne Martin, a South African then living in the United Kingdom who has since returned to South Africa. Afri Twin provides support for the programme by matching schools with suitable partners, providing guidance to participating schools and arranging workshops and other networking events. The benefits of Afri Twin partnerships include global learning, greater cultural tolerance and the improvement of learning facilities in disadvantaged schools. In 2010, there were over 250 schools in the United Kingdom and South Africa participating in the initiative.

== School clusters ==
Participating schools are arranged in collaborative clusters of up to six schools, including at least one British school and one South African school, with one aim being the upliftment of a disadvantaged South African school in each cluster. Apart from physical visits to partner schools, students at twinned schools are encouraged to learn more about other cultures via pen pal relationships, video chat, and blogging, and teachers exchange teaching tips and ideas. School clusters also collaborate on themed projects that incorporate a variety of school subjects and foster global citizenship.

== Funding ==
Some participating schools have received financial support for the initiative from the British Council, a British charity that promotes international educational and cultural relations. Participating schools also undertake their own fundraising projects to help finance overseas trips and school upliftment projects.

== See also ==
- Collaborative learning
- eTwinning
- Tafelberg School
