= Great Park Synagogue (Johannesburg) =

Orthodox Jewish synagogue in Johannesburg. South Africa

- Location of the synagogue in Greater Johannesburg

Religion
- Affiliation: Orthodox Judaism
- Rite: Nusach Ashkenaz
- Ecclesiastical or organisational status: Synagogue
- Leadership: Rabbi Dovid Hazdan
- Status: Active

Location
- Location: 75 4th Street, Houghton Estate, Johannesburg, Gauteng 2198
- Country: South Africa
- Coordinates: 26°08′47″S 28°03′40″E

Architecture
- Type: Synagogue architecture
- Established: 1888 (as a congregation)
- Completed: 1914 (Hillbrow); 2000 (Houghton Estate)

Website
- greatpark.co.za

The Great Park Synagogue is an Orthodox Jewish congregation and synagogue, located at 75 4th Street, in Houghton, Johannesburg, in the region of Gauteng, South Africa.

The present building was consecrated in 2000, after the congregation vacated their long-time home, the Great Synagogue on Wolmarans Street, Hillbrow in 1994, after eighty years. The Wolmarans Street synagogue came to be known as the city's mother synagogue and "the crown jewel of Orthodox Judaism in South Africa." All large-scale Jewish events in Johannesburg were held in the building, and throughout its existence it was the seat of the country's chief rabbi. Northward migration by congregation members led to the synagogue closing its doors in 1994. The relocated synagogue was built on the model of the Great Synagogue, whose own architecture in turn was inspired by the Hagia Sophia. Great Park Synagogue was also the original name of the synagogue on Wolmarans Street before it became the Great Synagogue.

== History ==
On July 10, 1887, a year after the city's founding, the Witwatersrand Goldfields Jewish Association was founded at a gathering in B. Wainstein's shop. The Association's original purposes included maintaining the Jewish cemetery and offering services to the Jewish residents of the city. On September 19, 1887, the first Rosh Hashanah service was held in the Rand Club, attended by 500 people. Several months after the association's foundation, its name was changed to the Witwatersrand Hebrew Congregation. In January 1888 the congregation purchased two plots of land on President Street to build a synagogue. On November 7 of that year, the Rev. Mark L. Harris of Kimberley laid the cornerstone and the work on Johannesburg's first synagogue officially began. The President Street Synagogue opened on 22 September 1889. At the time, schisms were forming in the young congregation and several Eastern European Jewish immigrants seceded to form the Johannesburg Hebrew Congregation as they found that the services were too anglicised. Their style of worship, fostered in Lithuania had been uninhibited and brief in comparison to the longer, formal services at the President Street synagogue. They built their own synagogue, Beth Hamedrash (‘House of Learning’) on Fox Street in 1893. A group of more established members also broke away from President Street. They took issue with Harris' approach to Halakha, Jewish religious law after he introduced a ‘mixed choir’ among other innovations. In December 1891, 150 of the founding and most wealthy members (including Sammy Marks) seceded from Prince Street to form Johannesburg Hebrew Congregation (JHC), under the leadership of Emanuel Mendelssohn.

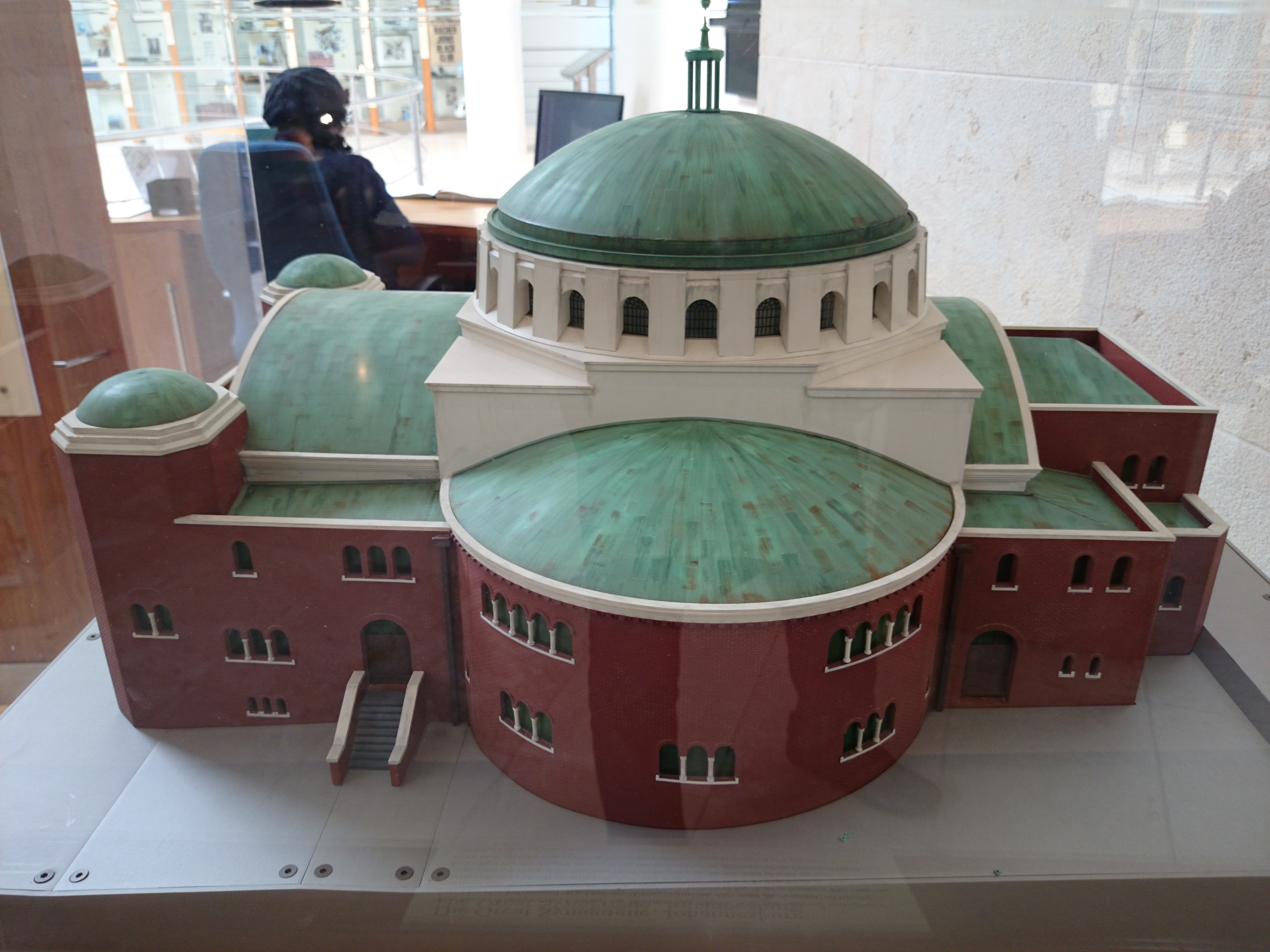
Model of the Great Synagogue at the South African Jewish Museum.

=== Split in the congregation ===
The parent congregation, the Witwatersrand Hebrew Congregation renamed itself the Witwatersrand Old Hebrew Congregation and hired Joseph Hertz as rabbi. South African president Paul Kruger granted four plots of land on the corner of Joubert and De Villiers Streets for the JHC to build its own synagogue. Since the latter was near the original Johannesburg Park Station, this synagogue, which has an Italian Renaissance design, was known as the Park Station Synagogue or simply the Park Synagogue, and was opened by Kruger on September 14, 1892. In 1903 the HEC appointed Rabbi Judah Leo Landau to lead the congregation. By 1913 the HEC was in need of a larger synagogue to accommodate a growing membership and the existing synagogue was sold to the South African Railways and Harbours Administration in 1912, where it served as a military headquarters for the SARH regiment until it was demolished in 1928 to make way for a new station. The new synagogue, the largest on the African continent, was consecrated by Rabbi Landau on 23 August 1914. The building was designed by Swiss architect Theophile Schaerer, and the contractors were Hoheison & Co. Sammy Marks provided the bricks, and handed over the key to the rabbi Landau at the inaugural ceremony. The building covers an entire city block between Wolmarans, Claim, Quartz, and Smit Streets. The site, chosen by the Jewish architect Hermann Kallenbach, was near the area where most of Johannesburg's Jews lived at the time. The sanctuary had a capacity to seat 1400 people (800 men and 550 women). There was also a rapprochement with the parent congregation after Hertz' departure to New York and both congregations agreed to amalgamate. On 30 May 1915, the United Hebrew Congregation (UHC) was formed with the new synagogue (the Great Synagogue) becoming the principal house of worship. The synagogue's protocol were influenced by the anglicised version of Britain's United Synagogue.

Chaim Weizmann, later Israel's first president attended services in 1932. Louis Isaac Rabinowitz was inducted as South Africa's Chief Rabbi in 1945 and began serving as the congregation's rabbi. In 1948 the pronunciation shifted in services from the Ashkenazi, Litvak standard to Sephardi (or Modern Hebrew). In 1957, Rabinowitz criticised the National Party over its attempts to extend apartheid to religion. He said that South Africa's synagogues were "open to everyone of any creed or color" and that non-white visitors and congregants "would be admitted to services in exactly the same way as Europeans." He highlighted that there was no colour bar in Israel and pointed to the existence of non-white Jews such as Yemenite and Ethiopian Jews. The building was badly damaged in January 1961 when the eastern part of the building was blown up, causing considerable damage to the interior. Those responsible for the blast were never found, despite extensive police investigations. Aubrey Marais, a former police detective in Johannesburg alleged that Argentina's Tacuara Nationalist Movement was responsible. In September 1963, Rabbi Bernard M. Casper was inducted as Chief Rabbi of South Africa, and began serving the Great Synagogue. Casper was inducted after his predecessor, Rabinowitz made aliyah to Israel. In 1988, Rabbi Cyril Harris was the last Chief Rabbi to be inducted at the Wolmarans Street location. In February 1993, Harris led prayers for a special 24 hour fast after a number of recent tragedies claimed the lives of local Jews. Harry Schwarz, South African Ambassador to the United States, joined in the fast. Rabbi Dovid Hazdan (b. 1958, Warmbaths) was appointed rabbi of the congregation in 1989, while it was still housed in the Great Synagogue on Wolmarans Street. He had moved to South Africa in 1983 to serve as principal of Torah Academy Boys High, and later became Dean of Torah Academy in 2000. Hazdan assumed the pulpit at a point of steep decline: attendance had fallen sharply from the mid-1980s as members migrated to Johannesburg’s northern suburbs, and the Wolmarans Street building closed in 1994. During those years he travelled to the city centre on foot each Shabbat to maintain services.

=== Relocation ===
Debate about relocating the synagogue began in the 1980s as urban decay became an issue in Hillbrow and as Jewish families deserted the inner city for the northern suburbs. In this climate the weekly attendance figures were diminishing and the local area was becoming increasingly blighted by crime. The synagogue on Wolmarans Street closed in November 1994. The congregation then moved to the suburb of Oaklands where a small synagogue was built on the property of Rabbi Dovid Hazdan. For five years services were held in the Rabbi's home during which the community began to blossom with many young members joining the Shul. During this time construction began on a more permanent site, and after five years the congregation moved to the new Great Park Synagogue on Glenhove Road, Houghton Estate, built on a smaller model of the Great Synagogue with seating for 650 people. The building includes fittings from the original synagogue on Wolmarans Street, such as chandeliers, candelabras, the bimah, pulpit, pews, clock, ner tamid and foundation stones of Johannesburg's earliest synagogues. The synagogue also has new elements such as stained glass windows by Judith Mason. The original synagogue building was sold for R850, 000 in 1998 and it was subsequently owned by the Israeli diamond dealer, Michel Rubinek who rented it to the Word of Life Assembly church. The Ark and women's gallery seating remain intact. However, the sale and current use of the building has attracted some controversy. David Sher wrote in Jewish Affairs: "our principal house of worship came to be handed over to a Christian domination, its exterior disfigured by chicken takeaways and inside a Christian motif painted over the Ark, beneath the Shiviti sign, without a word of reproach from any quarter." The current Chief Rabbi Warren Goldstein was inducted at the Sandton Shul rather than Great Park as the former has greater seat capacity. In 2013, Great Park formally celebrated its 100th birthday as the successor to the Great Synagogue.

== Notable members ==
- Helen Suzman (1917-2009), anti-apartheid activist and politician

== See also ==
- History of the Jews in South Africa
- List of synagogues in South Africa
