= 2010 Division 1 (Swedish football) =

Division 1
- Season: 2010
- Champions: Västerås SK; IFK Värnamo
- Promoted: Västerås SK; IFK Värnamo; Qviding FIF
- Relegated: Carlstad United BK; Östersunds FK; Arameiska-Syrianska KIF; Västra Frölunda IF; Torslanda IK; Ytterby IS
- Top goalscorer: Ken Hansson (23)

The 2010 Division 1 was contested by 28 teams divided into two groups geographically. Västerås SK and IFK Värnamo won their respective groups and were thereby qualified for play in the 2011 Superettan. Qviding FIF who finished second in the southern group were also promoted after winning their playoff.

== League tables ==
=== North ===
| Pos | Team | Pld | W | D | L | GF | GA | GD | Pts | Promotion or relegation |
|---|---|---|---|---|---|---|---|---|---|---|
| 1 | Västerås SK (C, P) | 26 | 16 | 4 | 6 | 54 | 29 | +25 | 52 | Promotion to Superettan |
| 2 | IK Sirius | 26 | 14 | 5 | 7 | 46 | 24 | +22 | 47 | Qualification to Promotion playoffs |
| 3 | Syrianska IF Kerburan | 26 | 14 | 3 | 9 | 50 | 44 | +6 | 45 | |
| 4 | Hammarby Talang | 26 | 12 | 5 | 9 | 44 | 41 | +3 | 41 | |
| 5 | Vasalunds IF | 26 | 13 | 1 | 12 | 42 | 37 | +5 | 40 | |
| 6 | Dalkurd FF | 26 | 11 | 6 | 9 | 49 | 46 | +3 | 39 | |
| 7 | Umeå FC | 26 | 9 | 7 | 10 | 51 | 42 | +9 | 34 | |
| 8 | Gröndals IK (R) | 26 | 10 | 3 | 13 | 38 | 46 | −8 | 33 | Relegation to Division 6 |
| 9 | Valsta Syrianska IK | 26 | 9 | 5 | 12 | 36 | 45 | −9 | 32 | |
| 10 | Bodens BK | 26 | 9 | 5 | 12 | 35 | 59 | −24 | 32 | |
| 11 | BK Forward | 26 | 8 | 7 | 11 | 45 | 40 | +5 | 31 | |
| 12 | Carlstad United BK (R) | 26 | 9 | 4 | 13 | 28 | 38 | −10 | 31 | Relegation to Division 2 |
| 13 | Östersunds FK (R) | 26 | 9 | 3 | 14 | 30 | 43 | −13 | 30 | Relegation to Division 2 |
| 14 | Arameiska-Syrianska KIF (R) | 26 | 7 | 6 | 13 | 27 | 41 | −14 | 27 | Relegation to Division 2 |

Source: svenskfotboll.se (in Swedish)
Rules for classification: 1) points; 2) goal difference; 3) number of goals scored.
(C) Champions; (P) Promoted; (R) Relegated

=== South ===
| Pos | Team | Pld | W | D | L | GF | GA | GD | Pts | Promotion or relegation |
|---|---|---|---|---|---|---|---|---|---|---|
| 1 | IFK Värnamo (C, P) | 26 | 16 | 4 | 6 | 57 | 30 | +27 | 52 | Promotion to Superettan |
| 2 | Qviding FIF | 26 | 15 | 6 | 5 | 44 | 22 | +22 | 51 | Qualification to Promotion playoffs |
| 3 | IF Sylvia | 26 | 14 | 6 | 6 | 51 | 33 | +18 | 48 | |
| 4 | IK Sleipner | 26 | 11 | 7 | 8 | 47 | 38 | +9 | 40 | |
| 5 | FC Rosengård | 26 | 11 | 7 | 8 | 51 | 45 | +6 | 40 | |
| 6 | Lunds BK | 26 | 10 | 9 | 7 | 36 | 25 | +11 | 39 | |
| 7 | IF Limhamn Bunkeflo | 26 | 8 | 12 | 6 | 38 | 36 | +2 | 36 | |
| 8 | Skövde AIK | 26 | 9 | 9 | 8 | 36 | 40 | −4 | 36 | |
| 9 | Norrby IF | 26 | 9 | 8 | 9 | 50 | 46 | +4 | 35 | |
| 10 | Kristianstads FF | 26 | 8 | 7 | 11 | 32 | 42 | −10 | 31 | |
| 11 | Husqvarna FF | 26 | 8 | 6 | 12 | 39 | 49 | −10 | 30 | |
| 12 | Västra Frölunda (R) | 26 | 6 | 8 | 12 | 28 | 47 | −19 | 26 | Relegation to Division 2 |
| 13 | Torslanda IK (R) | 26 | 5 | 3 | 18 | 29 | 52 | −23 | 18 | Relegation to Division 2 |
| 14 | Ytterby (R) | 26 | 4 | 4 | 18 | 30 | 63 | −33 | 16 | Relegation to Division 2 |

Source: svenskfotboll.se (in Swedish)
Rules for classification: 1) points; 2) goal difference; 3) number of goals scored.
(C) Champions; (P) Promoted; (R) Relegated

== Season statistics ==
=== Northern group top scorers ===
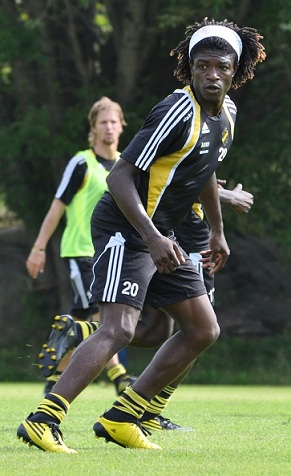
Mohamed Bangura was sold to Celtic F.C. for a fee over £2million after a successful stint in Allsvenskan with AIK.

| Rank | Player | Club | Goals |
|---|---|---|---|
| 1 | (Sweden) Danny Persson | Umeå FC | 17 |
| 2 | (Sweden) Mattias Mete | Syrianska IF Kerburan | 16 |
| 3 | (Sweden) Johan Pettersson | IK Sirius | 14 |
| 4 | (Sweden) Herish Kuhi | BK Forward | 11 |
| 4 | (Sweden) Filip Tronêt | Västerås SK | 11 |
| 6 | (Sweden) Ivan Tedengren | Hammarby TFF | 10 |
| 6 | (Sweden) Menhal Muqdisi | Syrianska IF Kerburan | 10 |
| 6 | (Sweden) Brwa Nouri | Dalkurd FF | 10 |
| 9 | (Sweden) Chriss Henriksson | BK Forward | 9 |
| 9 | (Sweden) Robin Ingvarsson | BK Forward | 9 |
| 9 | (Sweden) Adis Maglic | Carlstad United BK | 9 |
| 9 | (Sweden) Fadi Malke | Hammarby TFF | 9 |

=== Southern group top scorers ===
| Rank | Player | Club | Goals |
|---|---|---|---|
| 1 | (Sweden) Ken Hansson | FC Rosengård | 23 |
| 2 | (Sweden) Johan Sjögerén | Norrby IF | 17 |
| 3 | (Sweden) Timmy Vilhelmsson | IF Sylvia | 13 |
| 3 | (Argentina) Tomas Enrique Petry | IF Sylvia | 13 |
| 5 | (Sierra Leone) Mohamed Bangura | IFK Värnamo | 12 |
| 5 | (Sweden) Anton Holmberg | Qviding FIF | 12 |
| 5 | (Sweden) Johan Isgren | Lunds BK | 12 |
| 8 | (Sweden) Viktor Claesson | IFK Värnamo | 11 |
| 9 | (Sweden) Andreas Haglund | IK Sleipner | 10 |
| 9 | (Sweden) Robert Vilahamn | Ytterby IS | 10 |

== Stars of Tomorrow all-star game ==
At the end of each Division 1 season an all-star game is played called "Morgondagens Stjärnor" (English: "Stars of Tomorrow"), contested by the best young players from each of the two groups.

Team North
| Position | Player | Club |
|---|---|---|
| GK | (Sweden) Jacob Rinne | BK Forward |
| DF | (Sweden) Erik Figueroa | Hammarby TFF |
| DF | (Sweden) Hampus Jönsson | Gröndals IK |
| DF | (Sweden) Victor Lindelöf | Västerås SK |
| DF | (Sweden) Fredrik Lundgren | Bodens BK |
| DF | (Sweden) Alexander Milošević | Vasalunds IF |
| MF / FW | (Nigeria) Sunday Bale | IK Sirius |
| MF / FW | (Sweden) Simon Brännström | Bodens BK |
| MF / FW | (Sweden) Fredrik Forsberg | Hammarby TFF |
| MF / FW | (Sweden) Josef Ibrahim | BK Forward |
| MF / FW | (Sweden) Gzim Istrefi | Carlstad United BK |
| MF / FW | (Sweden) Ahmed Kango | IK Sirius |
| MF / FW | (Sweden) Joakim Lindner | Gröndals IK |
| MF / FW | (Sweden) Robin Tranberg | Hammarby TFF |
| MF / FW | (Sweden) Filip Tronêt | Västerås SK |
| Coach | (Sweden) Andreas Brännström | IK Sirius |
| Coach | (Sweden) Kalle Granath | Västerås SK |

Team South
| Position | Player | Club |
|---|---|---|
| GK | (Sweden) David Asmar | Västra Frölunda IF |
| DF | (Sweden) Fritiof Björkén | Lunds BK |
| DF | (Sweden) Mehmed Dresevic | Norrby IF |
| DF | (Sweden) Andreas Hadenius | IF Sylvia |
| DF | (Sweden) Linus Johansson | Kristianstads FF |
| DF | (Sweden) Mårten Nordbeck | Lunds BK |
| DF | (Sweden) Carl-Magnus Strömberg | Qviding FIF |
| MF / FW | (Croatia) Tibor Čiča | IF Limhamn Bunkeflo |
| MF / FW | (Sweden) Irfan Delimedjac | Västra Frölunda IF |
| MF / FW | (Sweden) Joakim Edström | Västra Frölunda IF |
| MF / FW | (Sweden) Michael Ibrahim | Husqvarna FF |
| MF / FW | (Sweden) Stefan Ilic | Östers IF |
| MF / FW | (Sweden) Esat Jashari | IK Sleipner |
| MF / FW | (Sweden) Albin Pettersson | Skövde AIK |
| MF / FW | (Sweden) Anton Vilstrup | Skövde AIK |
| Coach | (Sweden) Tor-Arne Fredheim | IK Sleipner |
| Coach | (Sweden) Lars Ternström | Qviding FIF |
