= Hans (given name) =

- Pronunciation: US: /hɑːnz/ HAHNZ, UK: /hænz/ HANZ; Danish: [hænˀs] German: [hans] Dutch: [ɦɑns] Hindi: [ɦɐ̃ns]
- Gender: Male
- Name day: October 25 (Germany); August 29 (Sweden); June 24th (Norway, Estonia, Denmark); December 27 (Finland)

Origin
- Origin: Pet form of Johannes
- Meaning: 'God has been gracious'
- Region of origin: German, Dutch, Scandinavian, Hebrew

Other names
- Pet name: Hampus
- Related names: Hanni, Hanno, Hánno, Hannu, Hánsa, Hansi, Hanski, Hanssi, Hanse, Hansu, Hensar, Hampe, Hanseraq, Hansinnguaq, Hasse

Hans is a male given name in Afrikaans, Danish, Dutch, Estonian, Faroese, German, Norwegian, Icelandic and Swedish-speaking populations. It was originally short for Johannes (Ioannes), but is now also recognized as a name in its own right for official purposes. The earliest documented usage was in 1356 in Sweden, 1360 in Norway, and the 14th century in Denmark.

The name Hansel (German: Hänsel, IPA: [ˈhɛnzl̩]) is a diminutive, meaning 'little Hans'. Another diminutive with the same meaning is Hänschen (IPA: [ˈhɛnsçn̩]), found in the German proverb was Hänschen nicht lernt, lernt Hans nimmermehr; which translates roughly as 'what Hansel doesn't learn, Hans will never learn'.

Separately derived, Hans is also a male given name meaning 'swan' in Sanskrit families of the Indian subcontinent.

== Alternative forms ==
Other variants include: Han, Hawns, Hanns, Hannes, Hanse, Hansi (also female), Hansie, Hansele, Hansal, Hensal, Hanserl, Hännschen, Hennes, Hännes, Hänneschen, Henning, Henner, Honsa, Johan, Johann, Jan, Jannes, Jo, Joha, Hanselmann, Hansje.

Pet, diminutive, alternative and other language forms are:

- Hannes (Dutch, German, Swedish, Icelandic, Finnish)
- Honza (Czech)
- Hovhannes (Armenian: Հովհաննես (Hovhannes) (reformed); Յովհաննէս (Yovhannēs) (classical))
- Jack (English)
- Johnny/Johnnie (English)
- John (English)
- יוֹחָנָן yokhanán, Yohanan or יְהוֹחָנָן yehokhanán, Yehohanan (Hebrew)
- Yohanna (Arabic: يوحنا) the Arabic language derivative, used among Arabic-speaking Christians
- Yahya (Arabic: يحيى), used among Arab and non-Arab Muslims
- Eoin (Irish-language derivation of Seán; in Irish and Scottish Gaelic refers to the Apostle)
- Evan, Ifan (Welsh a pre-Christian Celtic subsequently equated to John)
- Jevan (variation of Evan)
- Giovanni, Gianni (Italian)
- Ġwanni, Ġwann, Ġanni (Maltese)
- Jan (Norwegian, Swedish, Danish, Dutch, Polish, Czech, Slovak, German)
- Ján (Slovak)
- Janez, diminutives: Jan, Jani, Janko (Slovenian)
- János (Hungarian); diminutives: Jancsi, Jani
- Johan (Dutch, Swedish, Danish, Norwegian)
- Chuan (Aragonese)
- Joan (Catalan)
- Jean (French)
- Jehan, (medieval French), still in use, but rare
- Yann (Breton)
- João (Portuguese)
- Hans (Indonesian)
- Xoan, Xan (Galician)
- Johannes (Germanic: German, Danish, Norwegian, Swedish, Dutch)
- Johan, Johann (short forms of Johannes)
- Jón (Icelandic)
- Jonas (Lithuanian)
- Jovan (Serbian)
- Juan (Spanish and Filipino)
- Juhani, Juha, Jukka (Finnish)
- Ants (Estonian)
- Jānis (Latvian)
- Ansis (Latvian)
- Ian (Scottish derived from Gaelic Iain)
- Ion (Romanian)
- Ivan (Иван; Bulgarian, Croatian, Russian and other Slavic languages)
- Sean (Irish Seán, after the French Jean)
- Shane (anglicized form of Seán)
- Shaun (anglicised form of Seán)
- Shawn (anglicised form of Seán)
- Siôn (Welsh)
- Yohani (Kirundi)
- Yohanes (Eritrean)
- Giuàn (Western Lombard)

Feminine forms are:

- Hansina, Hansine
- Hanna/Hannah/Hanne (Danish, Norwegian)
- Ioana
- Jana
- Jane
- Joana (Portuguese and Catalan)
- Jeanne (French)
- Joanne
- Joan
- Johanna
- Johanne (Danish, Norwegian)
- Jean
- Janice, Janet, both shortened as "Jan"
- Non-English variants adopted as English names include Jeanette
- Seònaid, Sinéad, Seònag

== People named Hans ==
=== Arts and entertainment ===
==== Authors ====
- Hans Christian Andersen (1805–1875), Danish author
- Hans Henning Atrott (1944–2018), German author and theorist
- Hans Einer (1856–1927), Estonian language teacher, author of schoolbooks and a cultural figure
- Hans Fallada (1893–1947), German writer
- Hans Herbjørnsrud (1938–2023), Norwegian author
- Hans Holzer (1920–2009), Austrian-American author and parapsychologist
- Hans Henny Jahnn (1894–1959), German playwright and novelist
- Hans Lorbeer (1901–1973), German politician and writer
- Hans Erich Nossack (1901–1977), German writer

==== Music ====
- Hans Guido von Bülow (1830–1894), German pianist and conductor
- Hans Gruber (conductor) (1925–2001), Canadian conductor
- Hans Raj Hans (born 1962), Indian singer
- Hans Hartz (1943–2002), German singer
- Hans Werner Henze (1926–2012), German composer
- Hans Poulsen (1945–2023), Australian songwriter/musician
- Hans Söllner (born 1955), German singer-songwriter
- Hans Zender (1936–2019), German composer and conductor
- Hans Zimmer (born 1957), German film composer

==== Painters and sculptors ====
- Hans Coumans (1943–1986), Dutch painter
- Hans Ruedi Giger (1940–2014), Swiss painter, sculptor, and set designer
- Hans Heysen (1877–1968), Australian landscape painter
- Hans Holbein the Younger (1497–1543), German Renaissance portraitist
- Hans Noë (1928–2025), American architect and sculptor
- Hans von Petersen (1850–1914), German painter
- Hans Seyffer (1460–1509), German sculptor

==== Other arts and entertainment ====
- Hans Albers (1891–1960), German singer and actor, stage name Der blonde Hans
- Hans Christensen (silversmith) (1924–1983), Danish-born American silversmith
- Hans Clarin (1929–2005), German actor
- Hans Conried (1917–1982), American comedian and actor
- Hans Juda (1904–1975), British publisher, businessman, writer and designer
- Hans Kaldoja (1942–2017), Estonian actor
- Hans Klok (born 1969), Dutch magician
- Dolph Lundgren (born Hans Lundgren) (born 1957), Swedish actor and martial artist
- Hans van Manen (1932–2025), Dutch ballet dancer and choreographer
- Hans Matheson (born 1975), Scottish actor
- Hans Moser (actor) (1880–1964), Austrian actor born Jean Julier
- Hans Heinz Moser (1936–2017), Swiss actor
- Hans Obma, American politician
- Hans Werner Olm (born 1955), German cabaret performer and comic
- Hans Roosipuu (1931–2017), Estonian film director
- Hans Rosenthal (1925–1987), German entertainer and presenter, named Hänschen Rosenthal
- Hans Söhnker (1903–1981), German actor
- Hans H. Steinberg (born 1950), German actor
- Hans Strydom (actor) (born 1947), South African actor
- Hans Wegner (or Hans Jørgensen Wegner, 1914–2007), Danish furniture designer

=== Medicine ===
- Hans Asperger (1906–1980), Austrian pediatrician for whom Asperger syndrome is named
- Hans Berger (1873–1941), German neurologist
- Hans Sauer (1857–1939), South African general practitioner, lawyer, and businessman

=== Military and paramilitary ===
- Hans Aumeier (1906–1948), German Nazi SS deputy commandant of Auschwitz concentration camp executed for war crimes
- Hans Berndtson (born 1945), Swedish Army lieutenant general
- Hans Bothmann (1911–1946), German Nazi SS concentration camp commandant
- Hans Dreyer (1930/31–2015), South African Police major general and head of Koevoet
- Hans Hagnell (1919–2006), Swedish politician
- Hans Helwig (1881–1952), German Nazi SS concentration camp commandant
- Hans Horrevoets (1974–2006), Dutch sea sailor
- Hans Hüttig (1894–1980), German Nazi SS concentration camp commandant
- Hans Kalm (1889–1981), Estonian-born military officer
- Hans Krebs (SS general) (1888–1947), Moravian-born Nazi SS officer executed for war crimes
- Hans Krebs (Wehrmacht general) (1898–1945), last German Army chief of staff during World War II
- Hans Loritz (1895–1946), German Nazi SS concentration camp commandant
- Hans von Luck (1911–1997), German officer
- Hans Möser (1906–1948), German Nazi SS concentration camp officer executed for war crimes
- Hans Osara (c. 1560–1601), Finnish lieutenant in the Cudgel War
- Hans Oster (1887–1945), German brigadier general and deputy head of military intelligence
- Hans Simonsson (Swedish Navy officer) (1880–1965), Swedish Navy vice admiral

=== Politics ===
- Hans Apel (1932–2011), German politician
- Hans Barchue (died 2023), Liberian politician
- Hans Bentzien (1927–2015), East German writer and politician
- Hans Blix (born 1928), Swedish diplomat and politician
- Hans, Count von Bülow (1774–1825), Prussian statesman
- Hans Eichel (born 1941), German politician
- Hans Ekström (born 1958), Swedish politician
- Hans Ewerlöf (1929–2022), Swedish diplomat
- Hans Filbinger (1913–2007), German politician
- Hans Frank (1900–1946), German Nazi lawyer and governor general of Nazi-occupied Poland executed for war crimes
- Hans Friderichs (1931–2025), German politician and businessman
- Hans Dietrich Genscher (1927–2016), German politician
- Hans Gualthérie van Weezel (born 1941), Dutch politician and diplomat
- Hans Gustafsson (1923–1998), Swedish politician
- Hans Hamilton (1758–1822), Anglo-Irish politician
- Hans Heres (1945–2018), Dutch politician
- Hans Koschnick (1929–2016), German politician
- Hans Kruus (1891–1976), Estonian historian, academic and politician
- Hans Linton (1939–2010), Swedish diplomat
- Hans Maier (1931–2026), German political scientist, academic, and politician
- Hans Rasmus Hansen (1896–1971), Danish politician
- Hans Rebane (1882–1961), Estonian politician, diplomat and journalist
- Hans Reingruber (1888–1964) was a German academic and transport minister of East Germany
- Hans Strijdom (1893–1958), South African politician and Prime Minister
- Hans Unander (born 1970), Swedish politician
- Hans van Hooft Sr. (1941–2026), Dutch politician
- Hans Vijlbrief (born 1963), Dutch state secretary
- Hans-Jochen Vogel (1926–2020), German politician
- Hans Wiegel (1941–2025), Dutch politician

=== Science ===
- Hans Ankum (1930–2019), Dutch legal scholar
- Hans Avé Lallemant (1938–2016), Dutch-born American geologist
- Hans Bethe (1906–2005), German-American nuclear physicist, Nobel laureate
- Hans Bos (born 1950), Dutch biochemist and cancer researcher
- Hans Capel (1936–2023), Dutch physicist
- Hans Cohen (1923–2020), Dutch microbiologist
- Hans Albert Einstein (1904–1973), Swiss-American professor of hydraulic engineering, son of Albert Einstein
- Hans Freeman (1929–2008), German-born Australian protein crystallographer who elucidated the structure of plastocyanin
- Hans Geiger (1882–1945), German physicist, inventor of the Geiger counter
- Hans Hass (1919–2013), Austrian diver, naturalist and film-maker
- Hans Adolf Krebs (1900–1981), German-born, British physician and biochemist; identified citric acid cycle
- Hans Küng (1928–2021), Swiss Catholic theologian and author
- Hans Langmaack (born 1934), German computer scientist and mathematician
- Hans Lauda (1896–1974), Austrian industrialist
- Hans Lowey, Austrian-American chemist
- Hans Merensky (1871–1952), South African geologist
- Hans Oeschger (1927–1998), Swiss climatologist
- Hans Christian Ørsted (1777–1851), Danish physicist and chemist who discovered that electric currents create magnetic fields
- Hans Steffen (1865–1937), German geographer and explorer of Patagonia
- Hans Trass (1928–2017), Estonian ecologist and botanist
- Hans von Ohain (1911–1998), German Physicist, and Aerospace pioneer.

=== Sports ===
- Hans Christian Bernat (born 2000), Danish professional footballer
- Hans Christensen (footballer) (1906–1992), Danish footballer
- Hans Dersch (born 1967), American breaststroke swimmer
- Hans Eller (1910–1943), German rower
- Hans Erkens (born 1952), Dutch footballer
- Harold Goldsmith, born Hans Goldschmidt (1930–2004), American Olympic foil and épée fencer
- Hans Halberstadt (1885–1966), German-born American Olympic fencer
- Hans Holmqvist (born 1960), Swedish footballer
- Hans Knecht (1913–1996), Swiss road racing cyclist
- Hans Krankl (born 1953), Austrian football player and trainer
- Hans Lutz (born 1949), German track and road cyclist
- Hans Maier (water polo player) (1916–2018), Dutch Olympic water polo player
- Hans Maier (rower) (1909–1943), German Olympic rower
- Hans Nüsslein (1910–1991), German tennis player
- Hans Parrel (born 1944), Dutch water polo player
- Hans Podlipnik-Castillo (born 1988), Chilean tennis player
- Hans Sarpei (born 1976), Ghanaian soccer player
- Hans Stolfus (born 1976), American beach volleyball player
- Hans Vanwijn (born 1995), Belgian basketball player in the Israeli Basketball Premier League
- Hans von Tschammer und Osten (1887–1943), German sports director
- Hans Vonk (born 1970), South African soccer player
- Hans Wieselgren (born 1952), Swedish Olympic fencer
- Hans Wouda (born 1941), Dutch water polo player

=== Other fields ===
- Hans or John, King of Denmark, Scandinavian monarch under the Kalmar Union
- Hans Werner Aufrecht (born 1936), German automotive engineer, one of the founders of AMG Engine Production and Development
- Hans Benno Bernoulli (1876–1959), Swiss architect
- Hans Besig (1908–1965), German Classical archaeologist and teacher
- Hans Biebow (1902–1947), German chief of Nazi administration of the Łódź Ghetto, executed for war crimes
- Hans Claessen (1563–1624), Dutch founder of the New Netherland Company
- Hans von Dohnanyi (1902–1945), German jurist and resistance fighter
- Hans Otto Hoheisen (1905–2003), South African conservationist and philanthropist
- Hans Mayer (1907–2001), German literary scholar
- Hannes Meyer (or Hans Emil Meyer, 1889–1954), Swiss architect and second director of the Bauhaus
- Hans Niemann (born 2003), American chess player
- Hans Raastad (born 1943), Norwegian socialist
- Hans Jürgen Rösler (1920–2009), German mineralogy professor
- Hans Scholl (1918–1943), German resistance fighter
- Hans Wesemann (1895–1971), German journalist and Gestapo agent
- Hans Wittwer (1894–1952), Swiss architect and Bauhaus teacher

== Fictional characters ==
- Characters named Hans in Grimms' Fairy Tales:
  - "Blockhead Hans"
  - "Clever Hans"
  - "Hans in Luck"
  - "Hans My Hedgehog"
  - "Iron Hans"
  - "Strong Hans"
- Hans Brinker, Dutch ice skater in an 1865 novel by American author Mary Mapes Dodge
- Captain Hans Geering, in the BBC sitcom 'Allo 'Allo!
- Hans Gruber, antagonist from Die Hard
- Hans Landa, in the war film Inglourious Basterds
- Hans Moleman, in the TV series The Simpsons
- Hans Zarkov, a comrade of Flash Gordon in Flash Gordon, a comic strip and various adaptation in media
- Hans, Disney character and the main antagonist of Frozen
- Hans and Franz, recurring sketch characters on Saturday Night Live

== See also ==
- Hans-Jörg Butt (born 1974), German footballer
- Hans-Christian Hausenberg (born 1998), Estonian decathlete and long jumper
- Hans-Hermann Hoppe (born 1949), libertarian writer and theorist
- Hans-Ulrich Indermaur (born 1939), Swiss television moderator, reporter, and writer
- Hans-Joachim Kulenkampff (1921–1998), German actor and presenter
- Hans-Joachim Marseille (1919–1942), German captain and fighter pilot, flying ace during the World War II
- Hans-Joachim Queisser (1931–2025), German physicist
- Hans-Ulrich Rudel (1916–1982), German ground-attack pilot, the most decorated German serviceman in World War II
- Hans-Dieter, Hans-Günter, Hans-Jürgen, Hans-Peter, Hans-Ulrich, Hansjörg, given names
- Hanns, a given name
- Hansen (surname)
- Hanson (surname)
