= Union of Orthodox Synagogues =

Hechsher of the Kashut division

The Union of Orthodox Synagogues (UOS) is the coordinating body of Orthodox Synagogues in South Africa.

== Activities ==
- The UOS maintains a Beth Din, The Johannesburg Beth Din
- The Office of the Chief Rabbi Dr. Warren Goldstein
- The Kashrut Division supervises the production of kosher foodstuffs
- Fights missionaries through Jews for Judaism
- Publishes a magazine Jewish Tradition
- Maintains a Community Development Division helping affiliated synagogues develop and grow.
- Hosts The Sinai Indaba - an annual Torah convention featuring international Jewish thinkers and leaders.

=== Chief Rabbis ===
- Judah Leo Landau (1915–1942)
- Louis Rabinowitz (1945–1961)
- Bernard M. Casper (1963–1987)
- Cyril Harris (1988–2004)
- Warren Goldstein (2005–present)
