= Louis Braun =

German painter (1836–1916)

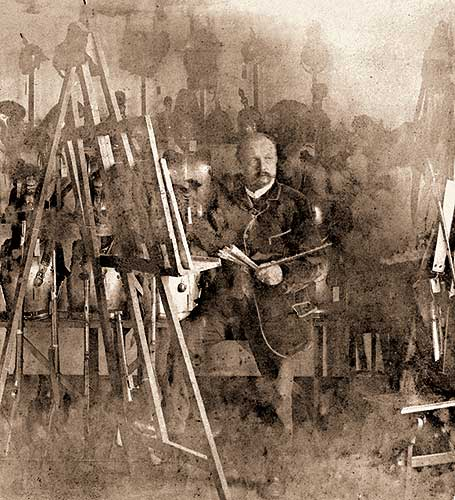
Painting in his studio in 1900

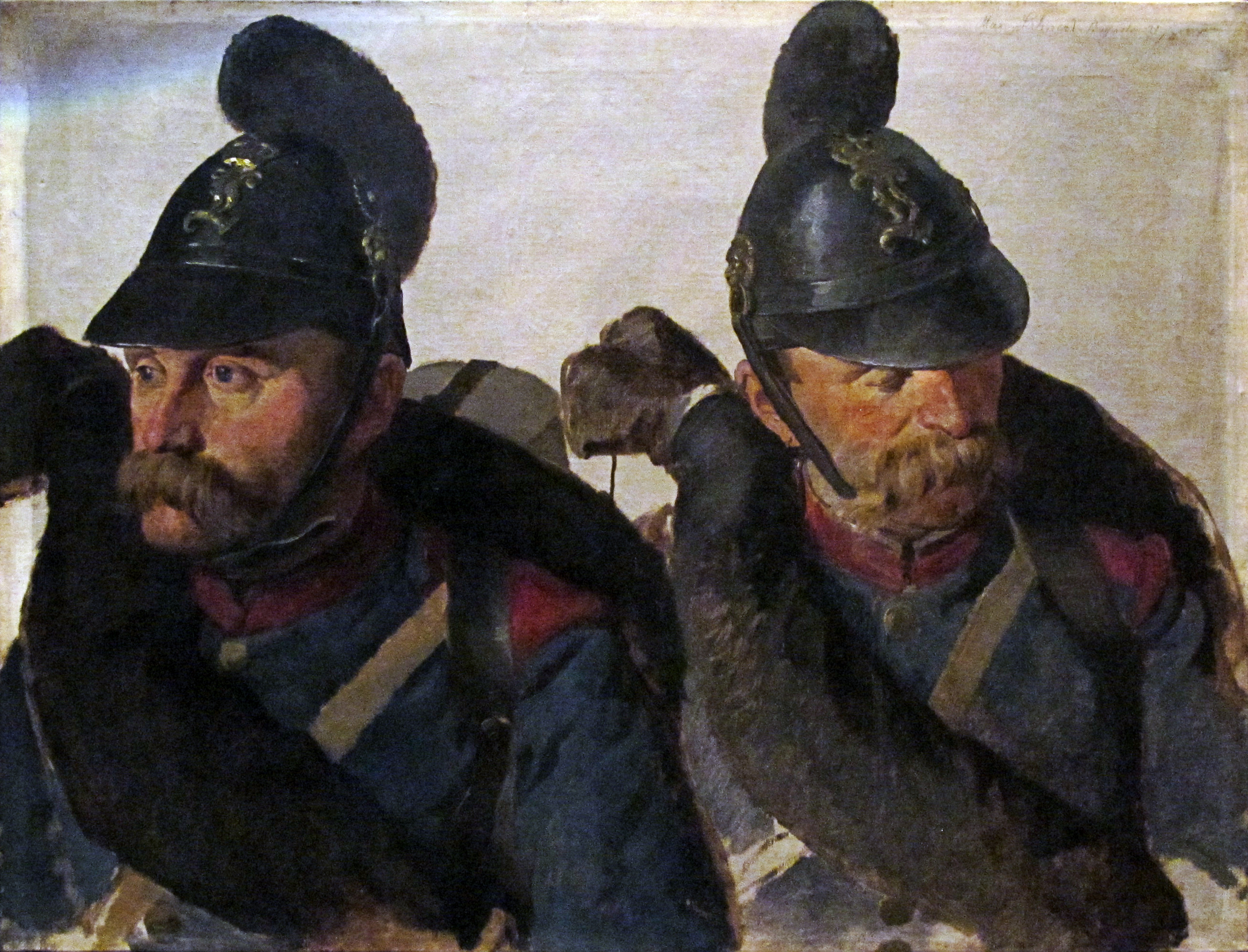
Bavarian Infantrymen

Louis Braun (23 September 1836 – 18 February 1916) was a German painter, mostly of battle scenes.

== Biography ==
Braun was born in Schwäbisch Hall, Württemberg, and was educated in Munich and in Paris. He followed as an illustrator the Austrian army during the Danish War of 1864 and painted several battle scenes for Emperor Franz Joseph I of Austria. He also accompanied the German armies in the Franco-Prussian War of 1870–1871, and as a result exhibited his pictures entitled Entry of the Mecklenburg Troops into Orleans, The Capitulation of Sedan, The Battle of Sedan (later exhibited in Frankfurt and elsewhere as a panorama), The Germans in Versailles, and The Entry of the German Army into Paris. The great success of the Battle of Sedan, in panoramic form, induced Braun (who in 1902 held a professorship at the Academy of Fine Arts, Munich) to produce several other works of the same description. Among these are the Battle of Mars-la-Tour (1884); Panorama of the German Colonies (with Hans von Petersen, 1885); and the Battle of Lützen (1892).

== See also ==
- List of German painters
