= Hampus =

- Gender: Male

Origin
- Region of origin: Sweden; Scandinavia

Other names
- Related names: Johannes; Hans

Hampus is a Swedish masculine given name which is the diminutive form of Hans. Notable people with the name include:

- Hampus Wilhelm Arnell (1848–1932), Swedish bryologist
- Hampus Bergdahl (born 1995), Swedish footballer
- Hampus Eriksson (born 1996), Swedish ice hockey player
- Hampus Finndell (born 2000), Swedish football player
- Hampus Hellekant (born 1976), Swedish murderer
- Hampus Holmgren (born 1995), Finnish footballer
- Hampus Jönsson (born 1991), Swedish football player
- Hampus Lindholm (born 1994), Swedish ice hockey player
- Hampus Nilsson (born 1990), Swedish football player
- Hampus Söderström (born 2000), Swedish football player
- Hampus Wanne (born 1993), Swedish handball player
- Hampus Zackrisson (born 1994), Swedish football player
