= Trans-Siberian Railway Panorama =

Simulated train ride

The Trans-Siberian Railway Panorama was a simulated train ride, using a moving panorama, first exhibited at the 1900 Paris Exposition. The panorama itself is also known as The Great Siberian Route: the Main Trans-Siberian Railway.

The Railway Panorama was commissioned by Compagnie Internationale des Wagons Lits, and shown in the Siberian section of the Exposition's Russian pavilion. It recreated the most interesting stages of a journey from Moscow to Beijing on the Trans-Siberian Railway. The actual trip would have been 6,300 miles, and taken 14 days, although not all of the tracks were in fact complete by 1900; the simulated experience lasted between 45 minutes and 1 hour.

The installation included three 70-foot-long luxury railway cars, complete with saloons, dining rooms, and bedrooms. The audience would sit in the railway cars, and view the panorama through the windows. Additional spectators could watch from rows of seats placed alongside the cars. The moving panorama was a stage-like area with multiple layers of moving objects and scrolling paintings. The nearest objects were sand, rocks, and boulders attached to a horizontal belt that moved at a speed of 1000 feet per minute. Next was a low screen painted with shrubs and brush, which moved at 400 feet per minute. Behind that, another screen with paintings of more distant scenery moved at 130 feet per minute. The final screen showed mountains, forests, and cities; it was 25 feet tall and 350 feet long, and moved just 16 feet per minute. The net result of these four layers was to produce a simulated perspective of great depth, via motion parallax.

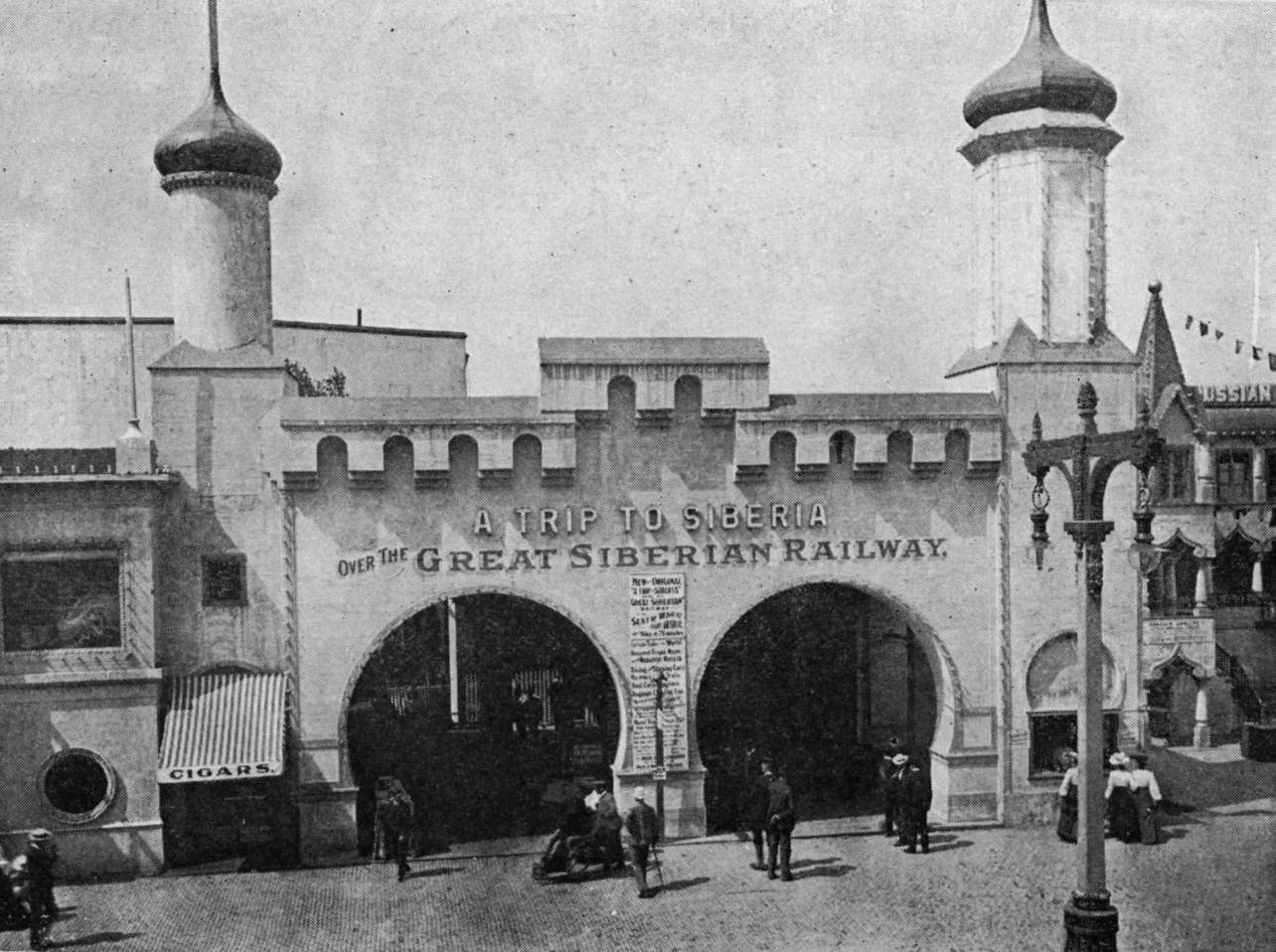
"A Trip to Siberia" - Panorama building at the Louisiana Purchase Exposition, 1904

The panorama was created under the direction of Pavel Yakovlevich Pyasetsky. Pyasetsky made numerous sketches and watercolor drawings based on trips along the railway route through Siberia beginning in 1897. Features shown included the cities of Moscow, Omsk, Irkutsk, and Beijing, and the Great Wall of China. The panorama was not fully complete until 1903, years after the Paris Exposition. According to a newspaper article and comments of filmmaker Alice Guy-Blaché, Pyasetsky was also commissioned to make a cinematograph of the trip, which was reportedly shown to Tsar Nikolas II, but the film was not used in the public exhibit.

The jury at the Paris Exposition awarded the Railway Panorama a Gold Medal, and Pyasetsky received the Order of the Legion of Honor. The exhibit was also shown at the 1904 Louisiana Purchase Exposition in St. Louis, Missouri.

The panoramic painting itself still exists, in the collection of the Hermitage Museum in Saint Petersburg. In 2004, the Hermitage announced plans to restore, document, and exhibit the painting.
