= Cyril Harris =

South African Chief Rabbi (1936–2005)

Rabbi Cyril Harris

Personal life
- Born: Cyril Kitchener Harris; 19 September 1936 Glasgow, Scotland
- Died: 13 September 2005 (aged 68) Hermanus, Western Cape, South Africa
- Buried: Israel
- Education: London School of Jewish Studies: Semicha, MA

Religious life
- Religion: Judaism
- Denomination: Orthodox Judaism

Jewish leader
- Predecessor: Bernard M. Casper
- Successor: Warren Goldstein
- Position: Chief Rabbi
- Organisation: Union of Orthodox Synagogues of South Africa

Cyril Kitchener Harris (19 September 1936 – 13 September 2005) was Chief Rabbi of The Union of Orthodox Synagogues of South Africa from 1987 to 2004 where he served as rabbi of the Great Park Synagogue (previously the Great Synagogue).

== Background ==
Harris was born in Glasgow, Scotland. During his tenure as Chief Rabbi, he was noted for his support of full democracy during South Africa's apartheid years. He spoke at the induction ceremony of President Nelson Mandela in 1994, and also gave a blessing at Mandela's wedding to Graça Machel in 1998. Mandela frequently referred to Harris as "my rabbi." He supported the aims of the Truth and Reconciliation Commission and represented the Jewish community in East London on 18 November 1997, the second day of the TRC's special three-day hearing into the role of the church under apartheid. Harris said that his community was not involved in establishing apartheid and that many disagreed with the policies. He recognised an awkward tension around apartheid, and that his community were beneficiaries. He noted that South African Jews overwhelmingly voted for opposition parties, rather than the governing National Party. He said that his community and the broader white community raised during apartheid, had a profound personal and collective responsibility as they confronted the idea that some of their attainments might have been achieved only because of apartheid’s role in denying to others what they now enjoyed. He opined that it was a moral imperative for apartheid beneficiaries to share with the previously disenfranchised populations.

He trained at the Jews College, and served suburban congregations in Kenton and Edgware and finally St John's Wood from 1979. From 1966 to 1971, Harris also served as Senior Jewish Chaplain to the British Armed Forces. Ahead of the 1991 retirement of British Chief Rabbi Immanuel Jakobovits, Harris was shortlisted as a potential successor. Ultimately, Rabbi Jonathan Sacks was appointed to the position. In February 1993, Harris led prayers for a special 24 hour fast after a number of recent tragedies claimed the lives of local Jews in South Africa. Harry Schwarz, South African Ambassador to the United States, joined in the fast.

He later went on to become one of the founders of Afrika Tikkun which is a South African-based NPO that focuses on the Holistic Development of young people in disadvantaged townships of the country. They focus on the Holistic Development of young people ages 2 – 35 years and provide them with education, family support services, primary health care, and food and nutrition services. In 1998, he appealed to Orthodox congregations in the country to reach out to disadvantaged communities and "adopt a project – if they are not already involved – in a specific educational developmental or welfare programme as a conscious activity to make a truly beneficial Jewish contribution towards upliftment."

He died in Hermanus, Western Cape, South Africa, aged 68, and was buried in Israel. The Chief Rabbi CK Harris Memorial Foundation was established to continue his legacy. For the fifteen years that followed, the Foundation assisted many organisations, within both the Jewish and broader communities, to train professional staff in fields in which Rabbi Harris "had a special interest and affection".

Religious titles
Preceded by Bernard M. Casper	Chief Rabbi of South Africa; Cyril Harris; 1987–2004	Succeeded by Warren Goldstein
