= Hans von Petersen =

German painter (1850–1914)

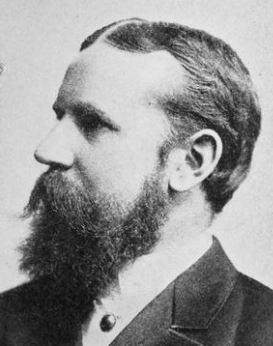
Hans von Petersen (1895)

Hans Ritter von Petersen (24 February 1850, Husum - 18 June 1914, Munich) was a German marine artist. He also painted landscapes, but they received little notice.

== Life and work ==
He received his artistic training in private art schools, and studied with the Danish marine artist, Anton Melbye. This was followed by studies in London. Some sources indicate that he also briefly attended the Kunstakademie Düsseldorf. This was followed by sea voyages to North and South America, India, and West Africa;, to acquire direct knowledge of his chosen subject. In 1884, while in West Africa, he was employed as a sketch artist by the Illustrirte Zeitung.

In 1885, he was attracted to Munich by an opportunity to work on a panorama of the German colonies, two of which, Togoland and Kamerun, may have been among the places he visited in Africa. His work on the panorama was done in collaboration with Louis Braun, who specialized in battle scenes. Upon its completion, he chose to remain in Munich. Over the next few years, he was involved in creating eight more panoramas.

In 1896, he was awarded a small gold medal at the Große Berliner Kunstausstellung. From 1897, he was a regular exhibitor at the Glaspalast. In 1901, he became manager of the exhibitions there, and was elected President of the Münchner Künstlergenossenschaft (artists' co-operative). That same year, he married the widow, Clara Wuth (1852–1923).

His paintings of naval ships and battles contributed to the enthusiasm for building a fleet, which was a major goal for Kaiser Wilhelm II. In 1902, he was elevated to the nobility by Luitpold, Prince Regent of Bavaria. Three years later, he built a villa in Emmering; designed by Karl Stöhr.

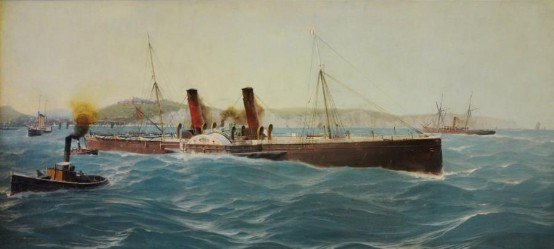
The Port of Dover, Reaching the High Seas

In his last years, he turned away from explicitly naval themes and focused on melancholy seascapes. Suffering from bouts of depression, and facing the possibility of going blind, he committed suicide by shooting himself, at his office in the Glaspalast.

== Sources ==
- Angelika Mundorff and Eva von Seckendorff (Eds.): Hans von Petersen (1850–1914). Ein Marinemaler in Bayern, Stadtmuseum Fürstenfeldbruck, Germering 2010, ISBN 978-3-00-030992-2
- Franz Schiermeier: Panorama München, Illusion und Wirklichkeit, München als Zentrum der Panoramenherstellung. Franz Schiermeier Verlag, 2010, ISBN 978-3-9813190-2-6
- Peter Bussler: Historisches Lexikon für Cuxhaven und Umgebung, Verlag Heimatbund der Männer vom Morgenstern, Bremerhaven, 2004, ISBN 3-931771-41-5
- Emmanuel Bénézit: Dictionnaire critique et documentaire des peintres, sculpteurs dessinateurs et graveurs, Édition Gründ, Paris 1999, Vol.10, pg.796 ISBN 2-7000-3020-6
