= Bernard M. Casper =

British South African rabbi (1916–1988)

Rabbi Bernard M. Casper

Personal life
- Born: Bernard Moses Casper; 1916 London, England
- Died: 1988 (aged 71–72) Jerusalem, Israel
- Buried: Jerusalem, Israel
- Spouse: Kitty Casper
- Children: 2
- Education: Trinity College, Cambridge

Religious life
- Religion: Judaism
- Denomination: Orthodox Judaism

Jewish leader
- Predecessor: Louis Isaac Rabinowitz
- Successor: Cyril Harris
- Position: Chief Rabbi
- Organisation: Union of Orthodox Synagogues of South Africa
- Began: 1963
- Ended: 1987

Bernard Moses Casper (1916–1988) was a British-South African rabbi. He was born and raised in London; educated in London and Cambridge; and served as both a Rabbi and educator in Manchester and London. He was a commissioned Chaplain in the British Army through most of the Second World War, and served with distinction as Senior Chaplain of the Jewish Brigade, earning a Mention in Despatches. He served as Chief Rabbi of the Union of Orthodox Synagogues and its predecessors in South Africa from 1963 to 1987.

== Early life ==
He was born in London, his father was from Kovno in the Russian Federation. Both his parents died when he was three years old and he was subsequently raised by his grandparents and a cousin. He won a scholarship to study at Trinity College, Cambridge and also began his rabbinical studies.

== Career ==
He moved to Israel in 1948 to complete his rabbinical studies and then returned to England where he was Head of Jewish Education and then rabbi at Western Marble Arch Synagogue. In 1956, he was appointed the first Dean for Student Affairs at the Hebrew University of Jerusalem where he stayed until 1963. During his time in Israel he was deeply concerned about impoverished neighbourhoods, particularly the Bukharan Quarter in Jerusalem. In South Africa he set up a special fund for their improvement and this was tied with Prime Minister Menachem Begin's urban revitalization program, Project Renewal. Johannesburg was twinned with the Bukharan Quarter, and Johannesburg Jewry raised enormous funds for its rehabilitation. Frustrated by the lack of progress, Casper traveled to Jerusalem in 1981 to resolve the hurdles. He consulted with community organizer Moshe Kahan and suggested that they present the dormant agencies with concrete evidence of what could be done. Using a private discretionary fund, he initiated development of several pilot projects, among them a free loan fund, a dental clinic and a hearing center whose successes spurred the municipality back on track.

On the advice of Israel's Chief Rabbi he took up the position of Chief Rabbi of the United Hebrew Congregation of Johannesburg. In his address at the ceremony at the Great Synagogue in Hillbrow, Casper pledged service in God’s name to “a steadfast Jewish community living a full life of freedom in South Africa.” In 1964 he became Chief Rabbi of the Federation of Synagogues of South Africa. One of his significant achievements was the 1965 concordat he arrived at with Chief Minister of the United Progressive Jewish Congregations, Rabbi Arthur Saul Super. They agreed that from "the religious point of view there is an unbridgeable gulf between Orthodoxy and Reform." Super said that this was the conclusion he arrived at “after a thorough examination of the Halachic situation and the Halachic principles involved.” The agreement was welcomed by the Jewish establishment in the country, with the South African Jewish Board of Deputies describing it as “a very sensible and practical agreement.” However, within progressive Jewish circles it was regarded as a capitulation to Orthodoxy. Super was only representing Johannesburg's progressive congregations in the agreement. His counterpart in Cape Town, Rabbi David Sherman was opposed to the position taken by Super, stating that it amounted to “allowing ourselves to be read out of the community of Klal Yisrael."

He retired in 1987, made aliyah to Israel and died eighteen months later in Jerusalem.

Religious titles
Preceded by Louis Isaac Rabinowitz	Chief Rabbi of South Africa; Bernard M. Casper; 1963–1987	Succeeded by Cyril Harris
