= Mareorama =

Moving panorama

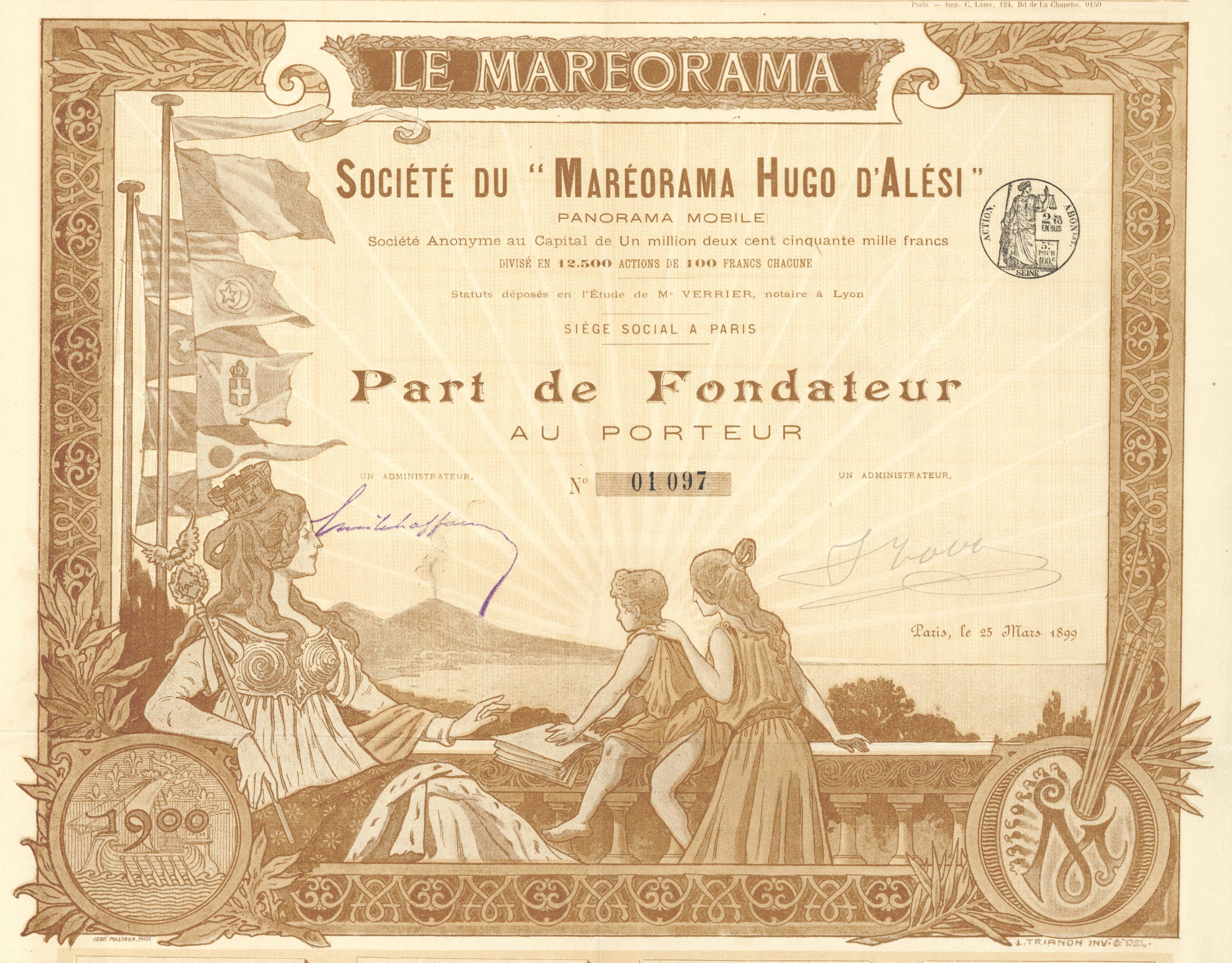
Founder share of the Soc. du "Maréorama Hugo d'Alési", issued 25 march 1899

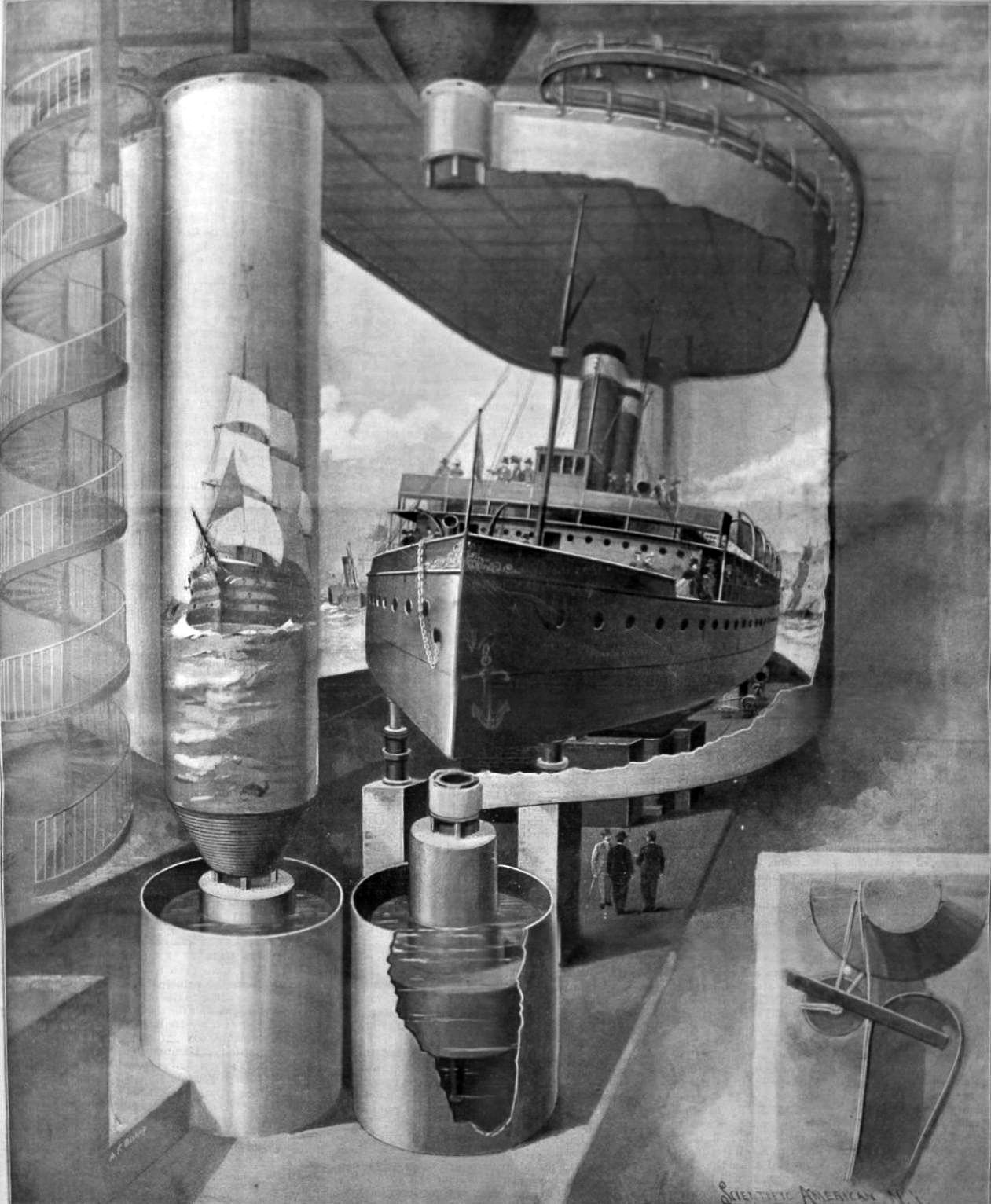
Illustration of the Mareorama, from Scientific American, 1900

The Mareorama was an entertainment attraction at the 1900 Paris Exposition. It was created by Hugo d'Alesi (fr), a painter of advertising posters, and was a combination of moving panoramic paintings and a large motion platform. It is regarded as one of the last major developments in the technology of panoramas, shortly before the medium became obsolete.

== Development ==
Between 1892 and 1900, many attractions were successful for the first time in the form of pantomimes lumineuses. For instance, in 1894, people could see moving photographs in Thomas Edison's kinetoscope and, starting in December 1895, they could see the first Lumière brothers' films. Seeing the success that it had generated, many entrepreneurs tried to incorporate moving images into their already existing amusements, because the recreational qualities of the moving images by themselves were not totally appreciable. So, instead of thinking that the images in movement threatened the panoramas of that time, entrepreneurs initially incorporated films on their panoramic screens with great enthusiasm.

== Functioning ==
Exhibited at the Paris Exposition in 1900, the attraction was located inside a building in the amusement section, on the Champ de Mars, at the corner of Quai d'Orsay and avenue de Suffren. The Mareorama simultaneously developed two panoramas in motion to the delight of the spectators, who placed themselves among them to create the illusion of being on the deck of a ship.

The two paintings were continuous images of the sea and shoreline from the trip. They were each 750 m (2,460.63 ft) long and 13 m (42.65 ft) tall. To create them, d'Alesi sketched the highlights from a year-long trip he took between Villefranche and Constantinople. He then directed a large team of decorative and scene painters for eight months, to transfer the sketches onto the 19,500 m² (around 210,000 square feet) of canvas. Mounted on large cylinders supported by floats, and driven by hydraulic motors, the two canvases unrolled past the spectators over the course of the simulated journey. The upper edge of each canvas was hooked to small trolleys on a rail and reinforced with a thin steel band to prevent sagging. The cylinders themselves were concealed by curtains and props.

Spectators stood on a platform which represented the deck of a steamship, complete with smoking funnels and steam whistles. In order to give it a rolling and pitching motion, it was mounted on a 5 m (16 ft) square iron frame on a gimbal. A combination of hydraulic cylinders, chains, and electric motors allowed the platform to pitch by up to 50 cm (20 inches) from horizontal, and to roll by up to 20 cm (8 inches).

The realism of the attraction derives both from the theme they represent and from the technology that puts passengers in the middle of things and the simulated movement. There was even a Mareorama that lasted half an hour and accommodated seven hundred spectators at a time, which offered a plausible itinerary to several ports. Among these we find a simulated voyage from Villefranche to Constantinople, passing by Sousse, Naples, and Venice.It was a sensory journey both in time and space. Mareorama, in that way, turned the spectators into "passengers" of a ship, since it simulated the emotion of traveling by sea with moving images, by consisting of a 33 m (around 108 ft) long replica of a steamship and 2 panoramas (one for the port side, one for the starboard) on large rollers.

== Optical illusion and reproduced sensation ==
The sensation of approach and detachment is experienced in an effect of the kinematic telescope: the physical limit of the city, on the edge of the sea, becomes a frame that widens. An open visual space. The views of a city that follow the course of a river that traverses its architecture also provide a cinematic diversity of perspective and movement: a first view of the city from a distance, then it gets closer to your heart and, finally, it moves away. In the words of architectural historian Renzo Dubbini, as one moves with the flow of the current, "the view is regulated by a continuous flow of images that changes constantly. The observation point moves along a succession of the innumerable points of view that make up a geographical route ".

The different scenarios reproduced reality in different ways. Whether relying on the optical illusions generated by the spectators, making references to other realistic genres such as the wax museum, or mechanically simulating the movement with a motion platform. Or whereas, juxtaposing multiple forms by accumulation, such as painted panoramas, moving images or live performances. In order to add to the illusion of a sea voyage, fans created an ocean breeze, which whistled in the rigging. Lighting effects created day- and night-time, as well as flashes of lightning. There were also sounds of the ship's screw and the steam siren. Seaweed and tar provided an olfactory element of the simulation. Overall, the whole experience was complemented by actors portraying deck hands, rushing about, "ostensibly to help anyone who may suffer from mal de mer". Finally, to impact in all senses at once and obtain the most realistic effect possible, they also presented a symphony composed by H. Kowalski played by an orchestra that could not be seen while the images were represented in the Mareorama. In this way, the sensorial direction of the panorama was multiplied.

This is how a technological march towards an increasingly perfectly realistic reproduction was created and eventually, towards the invention of cinema. However, having said that, in the end the cinema ended up eclipsing the popularity of the panoramas in the early years of the 20th century.
