= Hansjörg =

Hansjörg or Hans-Jörg (or Hansjoerg) is a German name composed of Hans and Jörg, equivalent to "John George" in English.

== Hansjörg ==
- Hansjörg Aemisegger (1952–2025), Swiss racing cyclist
- Hansjörg Aschenwald (born 1965), Austrian Nordic combined skier
- Hansjörg Dittus, German physicist whose fields of expertise are gravitational physics, metrology, inertial sensors
- Hansjörg Felmy (1931–2007), German actor
- Hansjörg Göritz (born 1959), German architect
- Hansjörg Hirschbühl (born 1937), Swiss bobsledder who competed in the early 1950s
- Hansjörg Jäkle (born 1971), German former ski jumper who competed from 1993 to 2002
- Hansjörg Knauthe (born 1944), East German former biathlete, who competed at the Olympics
- Hansjörg Kunze (born 1959), German track and field athlete
- Hansjörg Lunger (born 1964), Italian ski mountaineer
- Giovanni Giorgio Moroder, also known as Hansjörg Moroder (born 1940), Italian music producer and DJ, the "Father of Disco"
- Hansjörg Lips (born 1963), Swiss curler
- Hansjörg Pauli (1931–2007), Swiss musicologist, writer, and music critic
- Hansjörg Raffl (born 1958), Italian luger who competed from the late 1970s to the mid-1990s
- Hansjörg Schellenberger, German oboist and conductor born in 1948
- Hansjörg Schlager (1948–2004), German alpine skier
- Hansjörg Sumi (born 1959), Swiss ski jumper
- Hansjörg Trachsel (born 1948), Swiss politician and former bobsledder who competed in the late 1970s
- Hansjörg Vogel (born 1951), Swiss theologian who was the Roman Catholic bishop of the Basel
- Hansjörg Walter (born 1951), Swiss politician of the Swiss People's Party
- Hansjörg Wyss (born 1935), Swiss billionaire

== Hans-Jörg ==
- Eric Braeden (born 1931; Hans-Jörg Gudegast), German-American film actor
- Hans-Jörg Bendiner (born 1949), Swiss rower
- Hans-Jörg Bliesener (born 1966), East German sprint canoer
- Hans-Jörg Bullinger (born 1944), German scientist and former president of Fraunhofer-Gesellschaft
- Hans-Jörg Butt (born 1974), German footballer
- Hans-Jörg Criens (1960–2019), West German footballer
- Hans-Jörg Fecht, German metallurgist and university professor
- Hans-Jörg Hirschbühl (born 1937), Swiss wrestler
- Hans-Jörg Holubitschka (1960–2016), German painter
- Hans-Jörg Jenewein (born 1974), Austrian politician
- Hans-Jörg Koenigsmann (born 1963), German aerospace engineer
- Hans-Jörg Krüger (1942–2023), German basketball player
- Hans-Jörg Leitzke (born 1960), German football manager and former player
- Hans-Jörg Meyer (born 1964), German sport shooter
- Hans-Jörg Neumann, East German luger
- Hans-Jörg Rheinberger (born 1946), Liechtensteiner historian of science
- Hans-Jörg Schmid, German linguist
- Hans-Jörg Unterrainer (born 1980), Austrian snowboarder
- Hans-Jörg Uther (born 1944), German literary scholar
- Hans-Jörg Voigt (born 1962), German Lutheran bishop

== Hans Jörg ==
- Hans Jörg Mammel, German operatic tenor
- Hans Jörg Schelling (born 1953), Austrian entrepreneur
- Hans Jörg Schimanek (1940–2024), Austrian journalist and politician
- Hans Jörg Stetter (1930–2025), German mathematician

== See also ==
- Hans Jörg (born 1950), German footballer
