= Judah Leo Landau =

South African rabbi (1866–1942)

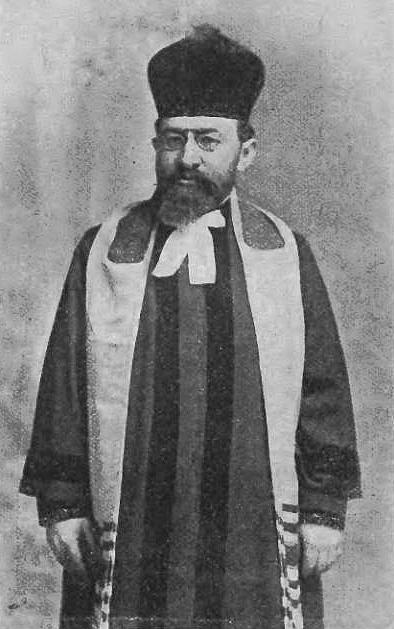
Judah Leo Landau (before 1906)

Judah Leo Landau (23 April 1866 – 26 August 1942) was a Galician-born South African rabbi and writer. A noted scholar, poet, and playwright, he served as the inaugural Chief Rabbi of South Africa from 1915 until his death in 1942.

== Early life ==
Landau was born in Zaliztsi (Załośce), near Brody, Galicia. He was a descendant of the Chacham Tzvi and the Noda Biyehudah. After attending the fourth Zionist Congress in London in 1900, Landau remained in England for three years. He was rabbi of the North Manchester Congregation.

== Johannesburg ==
In 1903, he was appointed to lead the Johannesburg Hebrew Congregation. Following the formation of the United Hebrew Congregation of Johannesburg in 1915, Landau was declared its Chief Rabbi. In the same year, he established the Johannesburg Beth Din.

== Bibliography of his writings ==
• LANDAU, J. L. 1884. Bar-Kokhba: shir ḥezyon tugah be-ḥamesh maʻarakhot. Lvov: [Druck von Anna Wajdowicz]. • LANDAU, J. L. 1885. Aḥarit Yerushalayim: shir-ḥizayon-tugah be-ḥamesh maʻarakhat. Lemberg: A. Wajdowicz. • LANDAU, J. L. 1887. Hordus: shir-ḥizayon-tugah be-ḥamesh maʻarakhot. Lvov: Druck von Felix Bednarski. • LANDAU, J. L. 1893. Yesh ṭiḳṿah: ḥizayon me-ḥaye ʻamenu be-zeman ha-zeh : be-shalosh maʻarakhot. Ḳraḳo: Bi-defus Y. Fisher. • LANDAU, J. L. 1895. Neginot: ḥoveret rishonah. Vienna: Be-vet ha-defus shel Yosef Fisher. • LANDAU, J. L., & FUCHS, J. S. 1897. Dam taḥat dam: ḥezyon tugah be-ḥamesh maʻarakhot. Kraków: Bi-defus Yosef Fisher. • SCHWARZ, A. 1898. ha-Gezerah ha-shaṿah: toldot hitpatḥutah be-sifrut ha-Talmud. Translated by Yehuda Leib Landau (German to Hebrew). Ḳraḳo: Be-hotsaʼat A. Foisṭ. • LANDAU, J. L. 1900. The modern rabbi, his duties and sphere of influence: English translation of the inaugural sermon delivered in German. North Manchester: North Manchester Synagogue. https://archive.org/details/modernrabbihisdu00landiala • LANDAU, J. L., & PERLZWEIG, A. 1900. Nachnu edim = [Naḥnu ʻedim]: a song of Zion. London, England: R. Mazin. UCT • LANDAU, J. L. 1901. Ḳenig Hordus. London: R. Mazin. https://archive.org/details/kenighordusland • LANDAU, J. L. 1904. Nachman Krochmal: ein Hegelianer. Berlin: S. Calvary. • Landau, J. L. 1904. Libot nishbarim. Lemberg.? • LANDAU, J. L. 1910. The Sabbath. Johannesburg: Ivry Pub. Society. https://archive.org/details/sabbath00land • LANDAU, J. L. 1914. The Talmud. Johannesburg: Transvaal Leader. https://archive.org/details/thetalmud00landiala • LANDAU, J. L. 1917. Preservation or assimilation?: a sermon on reform preached at the Park Synagogue on the second day of Passover, 1917. Johannesburg: United Hebrew Congregation. https://archive.org/stream/preservationoras00landiala... • LANDAU, J. L. 1917. Judaism in music: Jacques François Halévy; a lecture. Johannesburg: Hortor. https://archive.org/details/judaisminmusicja00landiala • LANDAU, J. L. 1917. Shnei Michtavim me-Rav Nachman Krochmal. In Festschrift Adolf Schwarz zum siebzigsten Geburtstage, 15 Juli 1916 gewidmet von Freunde und Schülern. KRAUSS, S., & SCHWARZ, A. eds. Wien: R. Löwit. https://archive.org/details/festschriftadolf00krauuoft. • LANDAU, J. L. 1919. The study of Hebrew: its past and future : an inaugural lecture. Johannesburg: University College, Johannesburg. UCT https://archive.org/details/studyofhebrewits00landiala • LANDAU, J. L. 1919. Don Yitsḥaḳ Abarbanel: ḥizayon hisṭori be-ḥamesh maʻarakhot. New York: J.D. Eisenstein. UCT https://babel.hathitrust.org/cgi/pt?id=uc1.b3168313;view=1up;seq=1;size=75 • LANDAU, J. L. 1923. Yiśraʼel Beshṭ: ḥïzayon hisṭori be-ḥamesh maʻarakhot. Wien; Johannesburg: Josef Belf. UCT • LANDAU, J. L. 1923. Le-fanim o le-aḥor: deramah me-ḥaye ʻamenu ba-zeman ha-zeh, be-arbaʻ maʻarakhot. Jerusalem: Ḥevrat "ha-Solel". • LANDAU, J. L. 1923. Short lectures on modern Hebrew literature from M.H. Luzzatto to S.D. Luzzatto. Johannesburg: Witwatersrand University press. UCT • LANDAU, J. L. 1929. Ṿiduyim: mikhtavim al devar ha-Yahadut ṿeha-Yehudim ba-zeman ha-zeh. Vinah-: Hotsaah Ivrit "Menorah, ". UCT • LANDAU, J. L. 1928. Zionism in the light of recent political events: a lecture delivered to the members of the Johannesburg women's Zionist league in 1917. Johannesburg: Johannesburg women's Zionist league. • LANDAU, J. L. 1933. Neginot u-foʼemot. Ṿarshah: Tsenṭral. UCT • LANDAU, J.L. 1933. Conflicting worlds: a drama of present day Jewish life. Translated by David Mierowsky. New York: Bloch. UCT • LANDAU, J. L. 1936. Judaism ancient and modern: a selection of Festival sermons. London, Edward Goldston. UCT • LANDAU, J. L. 1936. Judaism in life and literature. London: E. Goldston Ltd. UCT • LANDAU, J. L. 1938. Short lectures on modern Hebrew literature from M.H. Luzzatto to N.I. Fischmann. London: E. Goldston. • Various articles for Otzar Israel 1906-1913.

• LANDAU, J. L., & GASTER, M. 1936. Jewish Studies issued in honour of the Chief Rabbi J.L. Landau ... on the occasion of his seventieth birthday, etc. (Publication Committee: M. Gaster. V. Aptowitzer [and others].) [Essays in English and Hebrew. With a portrait.]. 96. Tel-Aviv • SLOMOVITZ, J. 1937. Bilder in shrifṭn. Johannesburg: J. Slomovitz. • LOURIE, H. 1942. Chief Rabbi...J.L. Landau, Johannesburg, South Africa. Reprinted from Bitzaron, the Hebrew monthly of America. VII(11). Hebrew. • MIEROVSKY, E. Avodato hasifrutit shel Judah Leib Landau. Reprint. • RAPPAPORT, S. 1955. J.L. Landau: thinker and writer. In The Jews in South Africa: a history. Saron, G. & Hotz, L. eds. Cape Town: Oxford University Press. • RAPPAPORT, S. 1959. Literary treasures in the Landau Library. Jewish Affairs. 14(8): 15-18. • GOUDVIS, B. 1959. Memories of Dr J. L. Landau. Jewish Affairs. 14(6): 11-14. • BERNSTEIN, E. 1962. The twelfth yahrzeit of Rabbi J.L. Landau: his life and work for South African Jewry. Jewish Affairs. 17(8): 18-22. • The centenary of chief Rabbi Dr. J.L. Landau: a biographical sketch. 1966. Jewish Affairs. 21(6): 6-8. • JUDELOWITZ, J.S. 1966. Some memories of a friendship. Jewish Affairs. 21(6): 9-11. • PERK, D. 1966. How a student remembers him. Jewish Affairs. 21(6): 12-13. • OREN, Y. 1967. The first Hebrew drama that was staged: J.L. Landau's "There is hope." Jewish Affairs. 22(9): 65-73. • RABINOWITZ, L.I. 1972. Hertz v. Landau: a clash of personalities. Jewish Affairs. 27(11): 17-19. • UNIVERSITY OF THE WITWATERSRAND, & LANDAU, J. L. 1974. Catalogue of Hebrew printed books in the J.L. Landau collection. Johannesburg: University of the Witwatersrand. UCT • SIMON, J. 1985. A literary plea for tolerance: John Simon interprets the play of the late Chief Rabbi Dr. J.L. Landau. Jewish Affairs. 40(9): 129-137. • SIMON, J. 1986. Landau and Bender: towards an appraisal of early South African Orthodox Judaism. In Procceedings of the Ninth Annual Congress of the South African Judaica Society, 3–4 September 1986. Cape Town: Kaplan Centre, University of Cape Town. • LANDAU, J. L., FRIEDLANDER, Y., & WEISER, R. 1989. Rav, meshorer u-maḥazai: Yehudah Leyb Landa. Jerusalem: Magnes Press, Hebrew University. • SIMON, J. 1991. Pulpit and platform: Hertz and Landau. In Founders and followers: Johannesburg Jewry, 1887-1915. Kaplan, M. & Robertson, M. eds. Cape Town: Vlaeberg. • LANDAU, Rabbi Judah Leo A2898 (Wits) http://www.historicalpapers.wits.ac.za/?collections/U/Collections : • Here is a book in Hebrew about him: https://www.nli.org.il/he/books/NNL_ALEPH001099895/NLI • Landau Archives National Library of Israel: • https://www.nli.org.il/.../NNL_ARCHIVE_AL002691683/NLI

Religious titles
Preceded by New office	Chief Rabbi of South Africa; Judah Leo Landau; 1915–1942	Succeeded by Louis Isaac Rabinowitz
