= Johan Pettersson (footballer, born 1980) =

Swedish footballer

Personal information
- Date of birth: 20 March 1980 (age 46)
- Place of birth: Sweden
- Height: 1.88 m (6 ft 2 in)
- Position: Forward

Senior career*
| Years | Team | Apps | (Gls) |
| 1998–1999 | IK Sirius | | |
| 2000–2001 | IF Brommapojkarna | | |
| 2001–2005 | IK Sirius | | |
| 2006–2007 | Örebro SK | | |
| 2008 | Degerfors IF | | |
| 2008–2009 | IK Sirius | | |
- * Club domestic league appearances and goals

Johan Pettersson (born 28 June 1980]) is a Swedish former professional footballer who played as a forward for IF Vindhemspojkarna, IK Sirius and IF Brommapojkarna.
