= Filip Tronêt =

Swedish footballer

Personal information
- Full name: Per Filip Tronêt
- Date of birth: 11 May 1993 (age 33)
- Place of birth: Västerås, Sweden
- Height: 1.86 m (6 ft 1 in)
- Position: Midfielder

Team information
- Current team: IFK Västerås

Youth career
- –2006: Skultuna IS
- 2007–2009: Västerås SK

Senior career*
| Years | Team | Apps | (Gls) |
| 2010–2011 | Västerås SK | 40 | (14) |
| 2012–2015 | IF Brommapojkarna | 19 | (0) |
| 2012 | → Västerås SK (loan) | 8 | (4) |
| 2015 | → Västerås SK (loan) | 11 | (4) |
| 2016–2023 | Västerås SK | 150 | (40) |
| 2024 | Europa Point | 11 | (2) |
| 2024 | Syrianska Eskilstuna | 17 | (4) |
| 2025– | IFK Västerås | 4 | (1) |

International career
| 2010 | Sweden U17 | 3 | (1) |
| 2011–2012 | Sweden U19 | 6 | (0) |
- * Club domestic league appearances and goals as of 29 August 2024

Per Filip Tronêt (born 11 May 1993) is a Swedish footballer who plays for IFK Västerås as a midfielder.

== Career ==
In December 2023, it was announced that he would move to Gibraltar in January 2024 to sign for Europa Point.
