= Warren Goldstein =

Chief Rabbi of South Africa (born 1971)

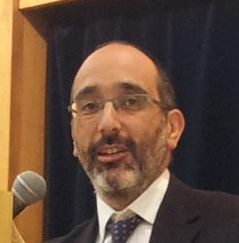
- Title: Chief rabbi of South Africa

Personal life
- Born: 1971 (age 54–55) Pretoria, South Africa
- Spouse: Gina
- Education: University of South Africa; University of the Witwatersrand
- Website: www.chiefrabbi.co.za

Religious life
- Religion: Judaism
- Denomination: Orthodox Judaism

Jewish leader
- Predecessor: Cyril Harris
- Position: Chief rabbi
- Organisation: Union of Orthodox Synagogues of South Africa
- Began: 2005
- Ended: Incumbent
- Semikhah: Yeshivah Gedolah of Johannesburg

Warren Goldstein (born 1971) is the chief rabbi of The Union of Orthodox Synagogues of South Africa since 2005. Born in Pretoria, he currently lives in Johannesburg. He is the first chief rabbi of South Africa who was born in South Africa and the youngest person ever to be appointed to that post, at age 32.

== Biography ==
Goldstein's great-grandparents immigrated from Lithuania to South Africa.

=== Education ===
Goldstein studied at the Yeshivah Gedolah of Johannesburg for more than fifteen years, where he received his rabbinic ordination from Rabbi Azriel Chaim Goldfein; he additionally qualified as a dayan through the Eretz Hemda Institute in Jerusalem. He has a BA, LLB (Unisa), and a PhD in human rights and constitutional law (Wits).

While practising as a rabbi he completed his PhD at the University of the Witwatersrand Law School. His PhD thesis compared western and Jewish law and was published as a book entitled Defending the Human Spirit: Jewish Law's Vision for a Moral Society. Goldstein's thesis is that Talmudic law was ahead of its time in terms of political rights, women's rights, criminal law and poverty alleviation: "I see Western laws as coming round full circle to positions always held by Talmudic law."

=== Service ===
Goldstein had a number of rabbinic positions before being appointed chief rabbi in December 2003. He assumed the full role in January 2005.

=== Chief rabbi ===
Due to his young age, Goldstein's election "startled" many people in South Africa.

He was appointed by the Union of Orthodox Synagogues on the recommendation of a selection committee made up of leaders of all the Jewish communal organisations. Chief rabbi Cyril Harris supported his appointment and, until he fell ill, he helped train Goldstein into his new position. Because of his illness, Harris was not able to attend the inauguration of his successor but sent a message to be read out. In it, he said: "Rabbi Goldstein is known as a Master of Torah, a Doctor of Laws, and a fierce campaigner on behalf of the vulnerable. His appointment is most welcome. Moreover, amid the turmoils of South African life, it promises entrenched stability."

At his official induction as chief rabbi of South Africa on 3 April 2005, Goldstein and those in attendance were addressed by South Africa's president Thabo Mbeki:

We salute Rabbi Goldstein as a true South African patriot...Rabbi Goldstein champions the very values which government would like to instil in our society. Civil society, including religious leaders, has a crucial role to play in South Africa today. By their personal example, and through the wisdom of their teachings, religious leaders such as Chief Rabbi Goldstein, can imbue our country with values of honesty, compassion and self-discipline that are so vital in establishing a truly just and moral society.

"Indeed, we are blessed to have a Chief Rabbi who is a formidable Torah scholar whose doctorate is in human rights and constitutional law, including that of our own Constitution."

== Areas of focus ==
=== Leadership ===
Engaging with government on issues affecting South Africa and the South African Jewish community, Goldstein initiated the 'Enriching Tomorrow - sharing ideas for the future' public speaking forum in which debate and sharing of views occur on the highest level. At these events, the chief rabbi has held public meeting with president Jacob Zuma, Graça Machel, Mamphela Ramphele and Frank Chikane, to name but a few.

=== Bill of responsibilities ===
Goldstein heads a project on behalf of the National Religious Leaders Forum and in partnership with the Department of Education to establish a bill of responsibilities for schools across South Africa with the aim of educating and motivating a new generation of South Africans in the values of responsibility, compassion and dignity, among others.

=== CAP ===
He is also the co-founder and co-chairman of the Community Active Protection (CAP) organisation which is a community based anti-crime initiative currently protecting at least 150,000 people in the city of Johannesburg and which has brought down contact crime between 80% and 90% in the areas in which it operates.

=== School Talmud learning ===
Goldstein has established a new Beit Midrash learning programme at the Linksfield and Victory Park King David Schools, and at the Herzlia high schools. The programme – which has hundreds of students enrolled in it – aims to empower and inspire the students with the knowledge and appreciation for text-based Torah learning.

=== Interfaith relationships ===
Sitting on the executive of the National Religious Leaders Forum, Goldstein engages with leaders of all faith communities on a regular basis. The forum hopes to achieve "poverty alleviation" and bring about "moral regeneration" in South Africa.

Shabbos Project

In 2013 Goldstein founded the Shabbos Project as a South African initiative encouraging Jews to observe one full Shabbat according to Jewish law. Organizers estimated that its first global iteration in 2014 reached one million people in more than 60 countries; by 2015, the project reported 5,000 partner groups and events in 560 cities.

== Opinions ==
=== Social issues ===
He is a regular contributor to print, radio and television on a variety of issues pertaining to "moral regeneration", crime, education, poverty alleviation and religious values in a modern society.

His website hosts regular podcasts, video blogs, published articles and it covers a wide range of his opinions.

Trembling Before G-d is a 2001 American documentary film about gay and lesbian Orthodox Jews trying to reconcile their sexuality with their faith. The film was screened in parts of South Africa in 2005. Goldstein described the film as "intellectually shallow," commenting that "its one-sided caricature of Orthodox Judaism does not stimulate meaningful intellectual debate."

Following a deadly confrontation at the Lonmin mine between striking miners and police in August 2012, Goldstein participated in the visit of the delegation from the National Inter-faith Council of South Africa to Marikana, the site of the clash, to offer condolences and support to the community.

== Publications ==
- Mandela, Dumani; Goldstein, Warren (2003). African Soul Talk: when politics is not enough. Jacana Media. ISBN 978-1-919931-54-8.
- Goldstein, Warren (2006). Defending the human spirit: Jewish law's vision for a moral society. Feldheim Publishers. ISBN 978-1-58330-732-8.
- Goldstein, Warren; Wein, Berel (2013). The Legacy: Teachings for Life from the Great Lithuanian Rabbis. Maggid Books. ISBN 978-1-592643-62-2. Archived from the original on 5 March 2013.
- Goldstein, Warren (2022). Shabbat. A Day To Create Yourself: Building character, shaping perspectives, and finding happiness through Shabbat. Chief Rabbi Warren Goldstein. ISBN 978-1-77641-460-4.

Religious titles
Preceded by Cyril Harris	Chief Rabbi of South Africa; Warren Goldstein; 2005–present	Succeeded by Incumbent
