= President Street Synagogue =

Former Jewish synagogue in Transvaal, South Africa

- Location of the former synagogue in Johannesburg

Religion
- Affiliation: Judaism (former)
- Ecclesiastical or organizational status: Synagogue (1889–1926)
- Status: Closed; Sold and repurposed

Location
- Location: President Street, Johannesburg, Transvaal
- Country: South Africa
- Interactive map of President Street Synagogue

Architecture
- Architect: Arthur Reid
- Type: Synagogue architecture
- Established: 1887 (as a congregation)
- Groundbreaking: November 1888
- Completed: 1889

Specifications
- Direction of façade: South
- Materials: Brick

The President Street Synagogue was a former Jewish congregation and synagogue, located in Johannesburg, Transvaal, South Africa. It was the first synagogue in Transvaal and was completed in 1889. The synagogue building was sold in 1926.

== History ==
The first Jewish service in Johannesburg was held in the store of a Mr. Weinstein on the corner of Mark and Harrison Streets. The first High Holy Days services were held in 1887 in the old Rand Club of Johannesburg on Commissioner Street by the rabbi Joel Rabinowitz.

Shortly, afterwards, from 1888–89, the President Street Synagogue was built. It was one of the first brick buildings in the young city and was designed by Arthur Reid and Robert McCowat and contracted to a Mr. Rowe. E. Mendelsohn laid the cornerstone on September 24, 1889, but the date was later held to be November 1888. When it was completed, Johannesburg had a Jewish population of approximately 100. The synagogue looked south onto President Street and stretched between Kruis and Von Brandis Streets. It was sold in March 1926.

== See also ==
- History of the Jews in South Africa
- List of synagogues in South Africa
