= Hans Besig =

Hans Besig (31 July 1908 – 4 June 1965) was a German Classical Archaeologist and teacher.

== Biography ==
Hans Besig's father, the jurist and church official Hans Besig (1873–1941), moved to Berlin in October 1914 to work at the consistory (as Oberkonsistorialrat). His son went to the Gymnasium in Berlin-Steglitz. After taking his high school exam in March 1927, he studied Classical Archaeology, Ancient History, Classical Philology and Art History at the University of Freiburg, the Ludwig-Maximilians-Universität München, Leipzig University, and the Friedrich Wilhelm University of Berlin. He also worked as teaching assistant at the Archaeological Institute of the Friedrich Wilhelm University of Berlin in March 1933 and again from October 1936 to July 1937. He graduated on 15 December 1937, with an archaeological dissertation ancient depictions of Gorgo as Dr. phil. His thesis was directed by Gerhart Rodenwaldt. At the same time, he received a travelling stipend of the German Archaeological Institute for 1937/1938.

After the end of World War II, Besig prepared for a teacher's exam in Berlin which he finished on 6 November 1948, obtaining the teaching faculty for Greek, Latin and German. He worked as a teacher at the Arndt school in Berlin-Dahlem, where he was appointed a Studienrat on 15 October 1953. He retired early at the age of 52 on 1 October 1960, and moved to Bavaria with his family. He died on 4 June 1965.

His sons are the cellist Hans-Peter Besig (b. 1949) and the violinist Jürgen Besig (b. 1951).

== Select publications ==
- Gorgo und Gorgoneion in der archaischen griechischen Kunst, Berlin 1937.
- Praeneste. In: Paulys Realencyclopädie der classischen Altertumswissenschaft (RE). Suppl. VIII, Stuttgart 1956, col. 1241–1260.
