= Johannesburg Beth Din =

Jewish Law court in South Africa

The Johannesburg Beth Din is the Beth Din (Court of Jewish Law) of the Union of Orthodox Synagogues of South Africa. It serves Jews throughout South Africa and other countries on the continent.

The focus of the Beth Din is on areas of family law, divorce and conversion, as well as adjudication of financial disputes. Other areas supervised by the Beth Din are: Circumcision, Stam, Mikvaot and Eruvin.

In 2004, the High Court of South Africa upheld a cherem (excommunication edict) against a Johannesburg businessman because he refused to pay his former wife alimony as ordered by The Johannesburg Beth Din. The case, because of its potential implications with regard to the interaction of religious and state law, elicited global interest.

== Dayanim ==
Current members of the Beth Din are:

- Dayan Dovid Baddiel
- Dayan Yoel Smith
- Dayan Gidon Fox

== Former Dayanim ==
Former members of the Beth Din include:

- Dayan Yitzchak Kossowsky
- Dayan Michel Kossowsky
- Dayan Yisrael Soloveitchik
- Dayan Shlomo Rosenzweig
- Dayan A H Lapin
- Dayan I Aloy
- Dayan Dr Dennis Isaacs
- Dayan Moshe Kurtstag (Rosh Beth Din)
- Dayan Baruch Rapoport (Rosh Beth Din)
- Dayan Zadok Suchard
- Dayan Shlomo Glicksberg
