= Tibor Čiča =

Swedish-born Croatian footballer

Personal information
- Date of birth: 31 December 1993 (age 32)
- Place of birth: Malmö, Sweden
- Height: 1.86 m (6 ft 1 in)
- Position: Midfielder

Team information
- Current team: IFK Simrishamn
- Number: 10

Youth career
- NK Croatia Malmö
- Malmö FF
- 2008–2009: IF Limhamn Bunkeflo

Senior career*
Years	Team	Apps	(Gls)
2009–2010	IF Limhamn Bunkeflo	21	(1)
2011–2014	Cesena	0	(0)
2012–2013	→ NK Zagreb (loan)	1	(0)
2013	→ HNK Gorica (loan)	0	(0)
2013–2014	→ Olhanense (loan)	0	(0)
2014–2015	FC Höllviken	9	(1)
2015	BW 90 IF	25	(2)
2016–2018	Österlens FF	52	(7)
2019-	IFK Simrishamn	20	(19)

International career^{‡}
2010	Croatia U-17	6	(0)
2011	Croatia U-18	4	(0)
2012	Croatia U-19	2	(0)
2011–2012	Croatia U-20	2	(0)
- * Club domestic league appearances and goals as of 28 May 2021 ‡ National team caps and goals as of 22 May 2012

Tibor Čiča (born 31 December 1993) is a Swedish-born Croatian footballer who plays for IFK Simrishamn.

== Club career ==
Born in Sweden to Croatian parents, Čiča started playing football at the age of 5, for the local Croatian immigrant football team NK Croatia Malmö. He moved afterwards to the youth ranks of the local giant Malmö FF, but at the age of 15, moved to the youth side of the newly merged IF Limhamn Bunkeflo. Čiča debuted in 2009 for the senior squad of his third-tier team aged only 15, scoring the match-winning goal. He also starred that year in the documentary "I Zlatans fotspår" ("In Zlatans footsteps"), a competition for the most talented young player of the Malmö region, where he emerged as the winner. He got more chances in the 2010 season of Division 1 Södra, establishing himself in the first team squad, and earning a call-up for the Croatian U-17 national football team.

=== Cesena ===
He was snapped up by the Serie A team A.C. Cesena in February 2011, signing a three-year professional contract for them in September 2011. On 10 August 2012, Čiča joined Croatian 1.HNL side NK Zagreb on a one-year loan. In February 2013, Zagreb loaned him to Croatian 2. HNL team HNK Gorica.

In March 2014 he was signed by FC Höllviken.
