= Louis Isaac Rabinowitz =

British historian and rabbi (1906–1984)

Louis Rabinowitz
- לואיס רבינוביץ
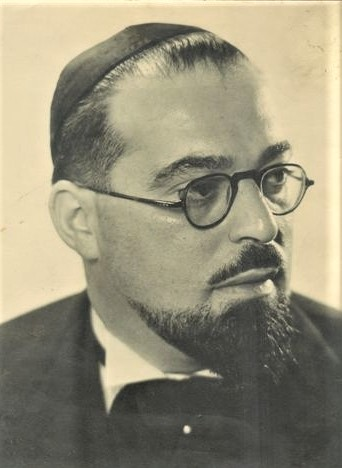

Deputy Mayor of Jerusalem
- In office 1976–1978

Chief Rabbi of the United Hebrew Congregation of Johannesburg and the Federation of Synagogues of Transvaal and the Orange Free State
- Incumbent
- Assumed office 1945

Personal details
- Born: 1906 Edinburgh, Scotland
- Died: 1984 (aged 77–78)
- Occupation: Orthodox Rabbi, historian and philologist

Louis Rabinowitz (Hebrew: לואיס רבינוביץ 1984–1906) was an Orthodox rabbi, historian and philologist of the 20th century.

== Biography ==
Louis Rabinowitz was born in Edinburgh, Scotland, and was descendant of a long lineage of Lithuanian Rabbis. His lineage to Rabbi Meir Katzenellenbogen, the Maharam of Padua, and to the House of David, is detailed in The Unbroken Chain. He was the Grandson of Rabbi Eliezer Simcha Rabinowitz of Lomza, and son of Rabbi Jacob Rabinowitz, who immigrated from Eastern Europe to become the Rabbi of Edinburgh at the end of the nineteenth century, and later moved to London, where he became the Rabbi of the Montagu Road Beth Hamedrash in Hackney.

Louis Rabinowitz was related to many distinguished Rabbis. His brother, Eliezer Simcha Rabinowitz, was the Rabbi in Kingsbury, London; Cape Town, South Africa, Newcastle-upon-Tyne, Hull, and finally of Cheadle in Manchester. His brother-in-law, Rabbi Dr. Julius Newman was the Rabbi of the Notting Hill community in London, and another brother-in-law was the noted synagogue stained glass window designer, David Hillman, son of Rabbi Shmuel Hillman of Glasgow and brother-in-law of Rabbi Yitzhak HaLevi Herzog, the first Chief Rabbi of Israel. Hillman's windows are to be found in many of the major London synagogues, such as St. John's Wood, Marble Arch, the Central Synagogue, Hampstead Garden Suburb, the New Synagogue (Egerton Road) and the Hendon Synagogue, as well as at the Renanim Synagogue in Jerusalem. His sister, Dr. Fanny Rabinowitz, who immigrated to Israel from London in the early 1950s, was a well known Jerusalem doctor who was influential in founding the nursing school at the Hadassah Hospital. She was also a recipient of the Yakir Yerushalayim ("Worthy Citizen of Jerusalem") award, making her and Louis the only sister and brother combination to have been so honoured.

== Rabbinic career ==
Rabinowitz served as rabbi in several London synagogues, including those in Shepherd's Bush, South Hackney, and Cricklewood. During World War II he was appointed Senior Jewish chaplain of the British Army; he served with Allied forces in the Middle East and during the Normandy invasion.

In 1945 Rabinowitz accepted a position as chief rabbi of the United Hebrew Congregation of Johannesburg and the Federation of Synagogues of Transvaal and the Orange Free State in South Africa. He became a professor of Hebrew at the University of the Witwatersrand and headed the Johannesburg beth din. Rabbi Rabinowitz was an ardent follower of Zeev Jabotinsky and his brand of Revisionist Zionism.

Rabinowitz gained notability by publicly discarding his military decorations in 1947 in protest of British policies in the Mandatory Palestine, which he viewed as a violation of Britain's mandate for Palestine. It has been argued that this was the reason why his candidacy for the British Chief Rabbinate in the mid-1960s was later passed over in favour of Rabbi Immanuel Jakobovits. Frequently outspoken in his political opinions, he was a harsh critic of the South African National Party's apartheid policies following the South African general election of 1948.

== Political career ==
In Israel, Rabinowitz became involved in Jerusalem municipal politics, serving as a city council representative and (1976–1978) and as Deputy Mayor of Jerusalem. He also became the Rabbi of the Herut-Etzel (Achdut Yisrael) Synagogue in the Nachlaot neighbourhood of Jerusalem, replacing Rabbi Aryeh Levin (the Rabbi of the Prisoners) following his death in 1969. While his positions on religion were considered to be quite liberal for an orthodox Rabbi, his political positions in Israel were right wing. He was a founder of the Movement for a Greater Land of Israel and opposed the Israeli withdrawal from the Sinai Peninsula as part of the Camp David Peace agreements with Egypt. He fell out with his friend, Prime Minister Menachem Begin, over this issue. Rabinowitz died in 1984, at the age of seventy-eight. His funeral was attended by President Chaim Herzog, to whom he was related, and former Israeli Foreign Minister Abba Eban. He was interred on Har HaMenuchot.

== Awards and recognition ==
He was named a Yakir Yerushalayim ("Worthy Jerusalemite") by the municipal government in 1980.

== Published works ==
- Rabinowitz, Louis I. Sparks from the anvil: sermons for Sabbaths, holy days, and festivals. Pp. xxvi, 347. New York: Bloch Publishing Co., 1955.
- Rabinowitz, Louis I. Soldiers from Judaea; Palestinian Jewish units in the Middle East, 1941–1943. With an introduction by James Parkes. Pp. 79. London: V. Gollancz Ltd., 1944.
- Rabinowitz, Louis I. Jewish merchant adventurers, a study of the Radanites. Pp. 212. maps. London: E. Goldston, 1948.
- Rabinowitz, Louis I. Far East mission. Pp. 223. illus. [Johannesburg? 1952]
- Rabinowitz, Louis I. A guide through Jewish life. [3rd ed.]. Pp. vii, 212. [Johannesburg, South Africa?]: Federation of Synagogues Women's Guild of South Africa, c. 1990.
- Rabinowitz, Louis I. The greatness of Solomon. Pp. 51, illus. [Tel-Aviv]: World Wizo Dept. of Organisation & Education, [197-]
- Rabinowitz, Louis I. The land and the people: a brief history of the Jewish people. Pp. 53. Jerusalem: Israel Digest, 1968.
- Rabinowitz, Louis I. Ma`a´se Rav. Pp. 110. Tel-Aviv: Mi´srad ha-bitahon, [1981]
- Rabinowitz, Louis I. Light and salvation; sermons for the high holy days. Pp. 349. New York: Bloch Pub. Co. 1965
- Rabinowitz, Louis I. The social life of the Jews of northern France in the XII-14th centuries, as reflected in the rabbinical literature of the period. 2d ed. Pp. 268. New York, Hermon Press [1972 or 3]
- Rabinowitz, Louis I. Soldiers from Judaea, Palestinian Jewish units in the Middle East, 1941–1943. Pp. 84. New York: American Zionist Emergency Council, by arrangement with V. Gollancz, London, 1945.
- Rabinowitz, Louis I. The Herem hayyishub; a contribution to the medieval economic history of the Jews. Pp. 184. London: E. Goldston, 1945

Religious titles
Preceded by Judah Leo Landau	Chief Rabbi of South Africa; Louis Isaac Rabinowitz; 1945–1961	Succeeded by Bernard M. Casper
