= Hampus Jönsson =

Swedish footballer

Personal information
- Full name: Hampus Erik Ludvig Jönsson
- Date of birth: 27 October 1991 (age 35)
- Height: 1.85 m (6 ft 1 in)
- Position: Defender

Youth career
- 2000–2010: IF Brommapojkarna

Senior career*
Years	Team	Apps	(Gls)
2010–2013	IF Brommapojkarna	21	(0)
2010	→ Gröndals IK (loan)	3	(0)
2014	IK Frej	24	(0)
2016	Bjärreds IF		
Total		48	(0)
- * Club domestic league appearances and goals as of 30 October 2016

Hampus Jönsson (born 27 October 1991) is a Swedish retired footballer who last played for Bjärreds IF as a defender.

Jönsson left Allsvenskan side Brommapojkarna in 2013, signing a 1-year contract with IK Frej in January 2014. When the contract expired, he decided to move to Lund to begin study at university, ending his professional football career.

In 2016, he played a couple of months with local side Bjärreds IF in Division 4.
