= Hans Otto Hoheisen =

Hans Otto Hoheisen (1 March 1905 Braamfontein, Johannesburg, Transvaal Colony – 8 July 2003) was a South African conservationist and philanthropist.

Hans spent a large part of his childhood on a farm near Hectorspruit close to the southern boundary of the Kruger National Park. His German-born father, Alfred Hoheisen, amassed a fortune as building contractor in the Reef mining industry after the Anglo Boer War, and invested heavily in Lowveld property, acquiring five farms in the Timbavati region west of the Kruger Park. Alfred also bought the fruit farm Drie Sprong in Stellenbosch, in 1938, which Hans transformed into a wine estate in the late 1940s. The farm's name was later changed to Delheim, which is now a leading South African Wine Estate.

When his father died in 1965, Hans inherited the remainder of his father's farms and became an ardent conservationist and developed these properties into a secure refuge for wildlife.

In 1990, Hans donated 15 000 hectares to the World Wildlife Fund of Southern Africa. This land grant was the first increase in the Park area since 1926. In the same area near Hoedspruit he persuaded the German Ministry of Economic Cooperation via the German Development Bank to fund the construction of the Southern African Wildlife College which is a non-profit organisation offering conservation education. In 1980 he donated 37ha of his farm Kempiana for establishing the Hans Hoheisen Wildlife Research Centre, near the Kruger Park's Orpen Gate - the centre was officially opened on 15 July 1983.
