= Tudeley =

Human settlement in Kent, England

Coordinates: 51.1848°N 0.3185°E

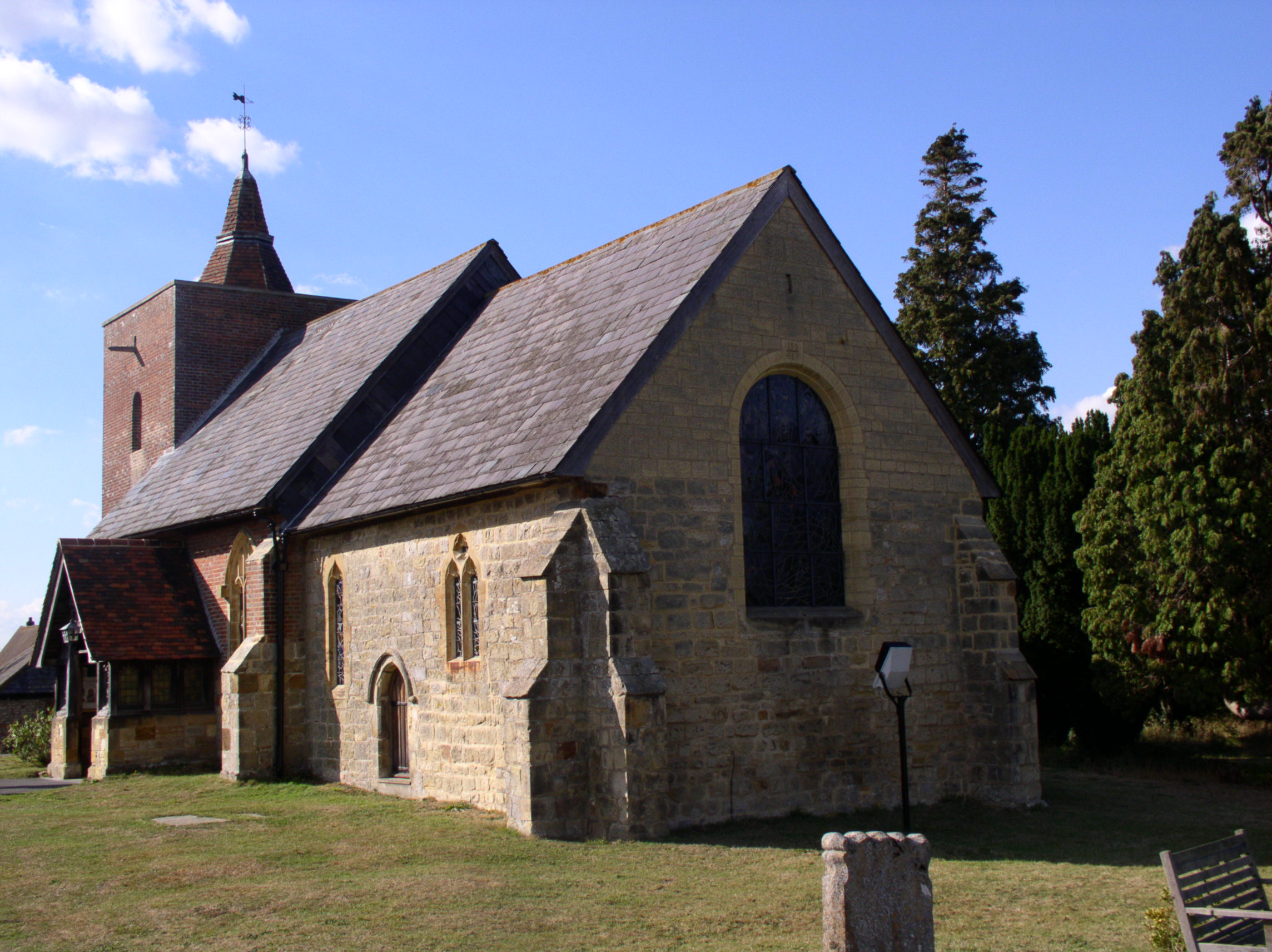
- All Saints Church

- Location within Kent
- Civil parish: Capel
- District: Tunbridge Wells
- Shire county: Kent
- Region: South East
- Country: England
- Sovereign state: United Kingdom
- Post town: Tonbridge
- Postcode district: TN11
- Dialling code: 01732
- Police: Kent
- Fire: Kent
- Ambulance: South East Coast
- UK Parliament: Tunbridge Wells

Tudeley is a village in the civil parish of Capel, in the Tunbridge Wells borough of Kent, England.

The village is home to All Saints Church, the only church in the world that has all its windows in stained glass designed by Marc Chagall. The East window was commissioned by Sir Henry and Lady D'Avigdor-Goldsmid in memory of their daughter Sarah, who died aged 21 in a sailing accident in 1963. The other windows were added later, the final ones being installed in 1985, the year of Chagall's death. Today the church also hosts the Tudeley Festival, an early music event which has been running since 1985.

In 1881 the civil parish had a population of 549. On 25 March 1885 the parish was abolished and merged with Capel.

Somerhill House, which houses The Schools at Somerhill, lies within the bounds of Tudeley.

== Nature ==
Tudeley Woods is owned by the Hadlow Estate and managed in partnership with the RSPB. It comprises restored ancient wood and heathland, which have been connected through extensive coppicing to open up the woodland floor and allow the woodland flowers and butterflies to flourish. The result is that there more than 1,000 species of fungi in the woods, with orchids intermingled with carpets of bluebells and primroses in spring. The coppicing allows for charcoal burning, with the products sold locally. Free to access, car parking is restricted, whilst dogs on leads are allowed on the public footpaths and bridleways.

== Future ==
The Tunbridge Wells Borough draft local plan published in August 2019, suggests a new town of 2,800 dwellings replacing the village and destroying 600 acres (240 ha) of green belt land including ancient woodland and the habitat of three European protected species. Despite vocal local concern over the destruction of green belt and agricultural land and serious transport issues the borough council decided to press ahead with the plan.

In 2024 the plan was the subject of the issue evaluation for the AQA GCSE Geography Paper 3 exam.

== Images ==
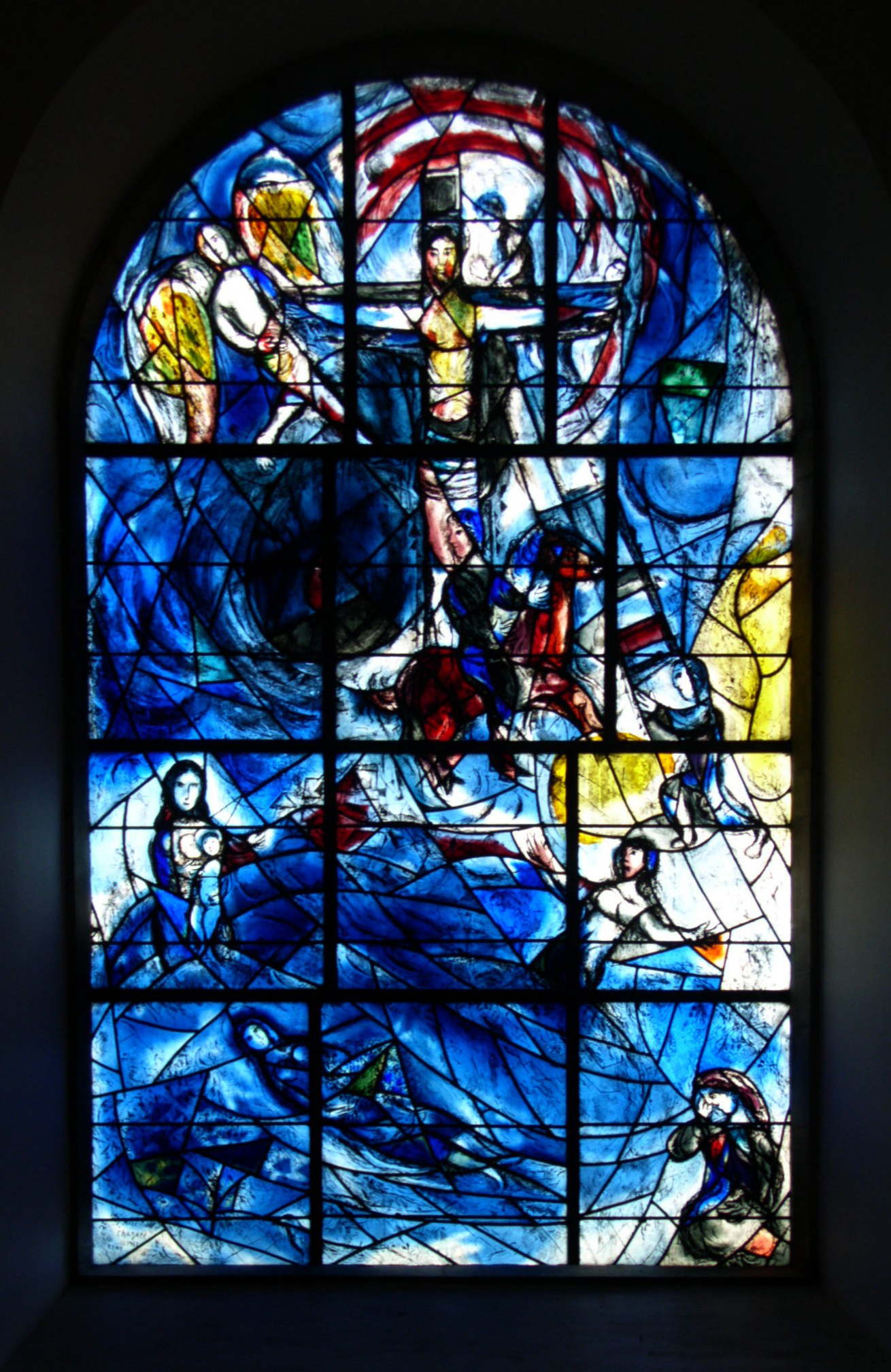
The East Window by Marc Chagall in All Saints' church

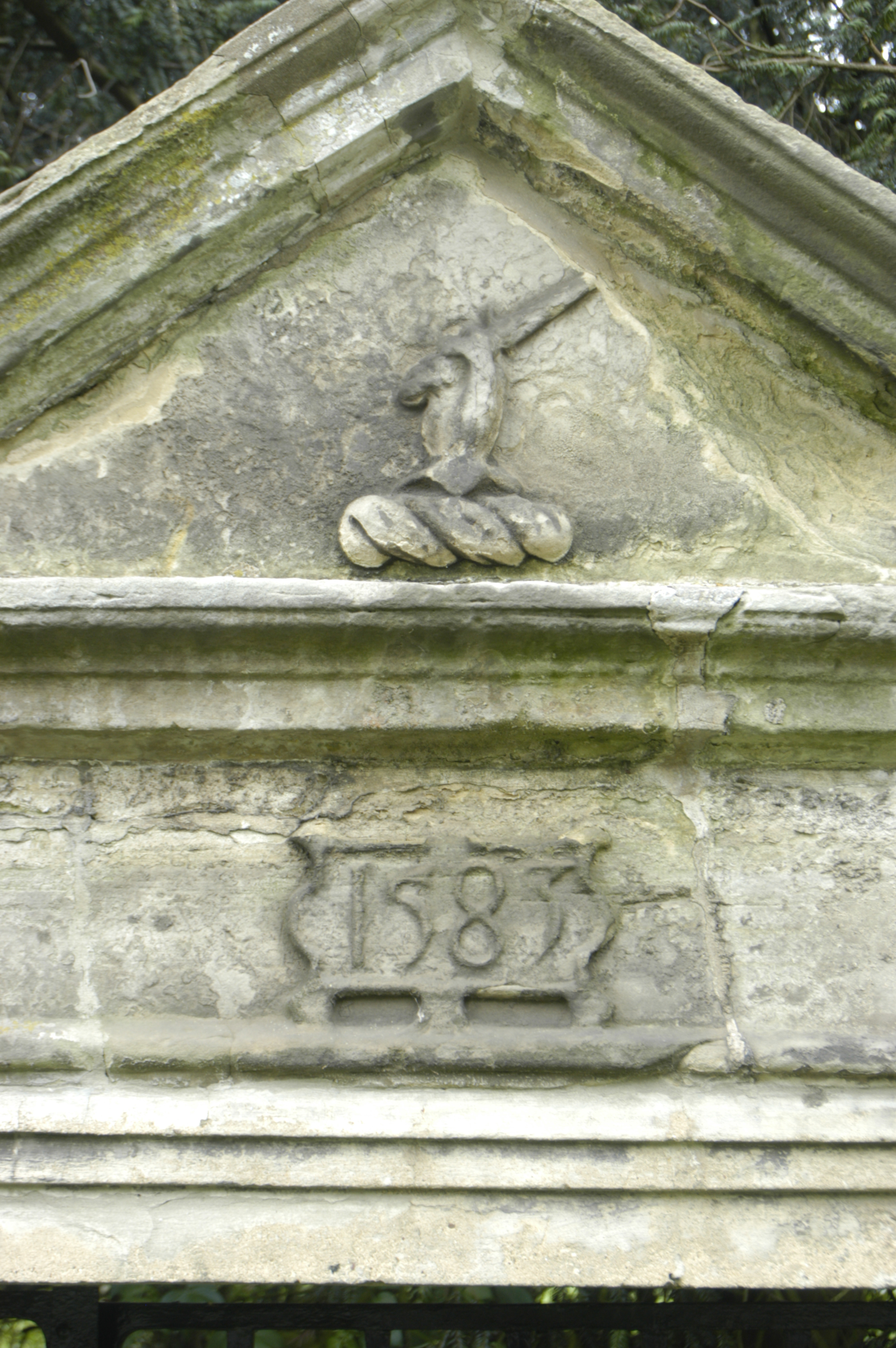
Detail of a small gateway dated 1583, inscribed TF and MF for Thomas and Mary Fane, that was at Badsell until the 1920s, and is now at Fulbeck.
