= The Schools at Somerhill =

Independent preparatory school in Tonbridge, Kent, England

Somerhill

Location
- Somerhill, Tudeley Road; Tonbridge, Kent, TN11 0NJ; England; 51.18468°N 0.29905°E

Information
- Former names: The Schools at Somerhill
- Type: Independent day preparatory school
- Established: 1898 (Yardley Court); 1930s (Derwent Lodge); 1995 (Somerhill Pre-Prep); 2018 (single school)
- Trust: Somerhill Charitable Trust Limited
- Department for Education URN: 118960 Tables
- Head: Rhian Thornton
- Gender: Mixed (co-educational to age 7, single-sex classes from age 7)
- Age: 2 to 13
- Enrolment: 518 (November 2026)
- Colours: Dark green (whole school); Pink (Yardley Court); Green (Pre-Prep); Blue (Derwent Lodge)
- Website: www.somerhill.org

Somerhill (known until 2018 as The Schools at Somerhill) is an independent day preparatory school for boys and girls aged 2 to 13, near Tonbridge, Kent, England. It occupies Somerhill House, a Grade I listed Jacobean mansion, and its surrounding parkland. The school was formed from three previously separate schools that came to share the site in the 1990s: Yardley Court (boys), Derwent Lodge (girls), and Somerhill Pre-Prep. It is run by Somerhill Charitable Trust Limited, a registered charity.

== History ==
Yardley Court was founded as a boys' preparatory school in Tonbridge in 1898. In 1988 the school bought Somerhill House, its gardens, and about 61 hectares (150 acres) of parkland, and began converting the house for school use. Yardley Court moved to Somerhill in 1990.

Derwent Lodge, a girls' school established in Tunbridge Wells in the 1930s, relocated to Somerhill in 1993 after outgrowing its town-centre premises. Somerhill Pre-Prep, a co-educational school for younger children, was founded on the site in 1995.

=== The Schools at Somerhill (1990–2018) ===
From the 1990s until 2018 the three schools shared the site but operated as separate entities, under the collective name The Schools at Somerhill. In 2014 John Coakley was both headmaster of Yardley Court and principal of The Schools at Somerhill, while Derwent Lodge had its own headteacher, Sam Michau, appointed in 2009. The pre-prep, housed in the former coach houses, then had more than 250 children.

=== Somerhill (since 2018) ===
In 2018 the three schools were brought together as a single school, Somerhill. The names Yardley Court and Derwent Lodge continue to be used for the boys' and girls' sections of the prep school.

Rhian Thornton, previously head of Upton House School in Windsor, became Head in April 2026.

== Somerhill House ==
Somerhill House, home to Somerhill Prepatory School

The school's main building, Somerhill House, was built between 1611 and 1613 for Richard Burke, 4th Earl of Clanricarde, to a design attributed to John Thorpe. It has been Grade I listed since 1954, and its park and garden are registered at Grade II. The house was owned by the Goldsmid and d'Avigdor-Goldsmid family from 1849 until 1981, and was substantially enlarged for Sir Julian Goldsmid in the late 19th century. During the Second World War a prisoner-of-war camp stood in the park.

After the 1981 sale the house passed through several owners and fell into disrepair, before its purchase by Yardley Court in 1988. It was repaired and restored between 1989 and 1991. The 17th-century library, now the Woodgate Library, is used as the school library.

== Structure ==
Boys and girls are taught together in the pre-school and pre-prep, and in single-sex classes in the prep school, while sharing facilities, break times, assemblies, and co-curricular activities.

=== Pre-prep ===
The pre-prep is co-educational and takes children from the age of 2 to 7. It begins with the pre-school, made up of Nursery and Kindergarten classes, which children can join from the age of two and attend for a minimum of three sessions a week. Pre-school children can take part in Saplings, an outdoor programme based on forest school principles. Reception, Year 1, and Year 2 follow, with specialist teaching in physical education, swimming, French, and music. Pupils move up to the prep school at the end of Year 2.

=== Prep ===
From Year 3, boys and girls are taught in separate classes, with the boys' section known as Yardley Court and the girls' section as Derwent Lodge, after the two schools from which Somerhill was formed. Each section has four houses, which compete against one another in events such as swimming galas.

==== Yardley Court ====
Yardley Court is the prep section for boys aged 7 to 13 (Years 3 to 8). Its four houses are Ashmore, Hudson, Marques, and Nicolson, each named after former pupils of Yardley Court: the naval officers Sir Edward Ashmore and his brother Sir Peter Ashmore; Guy Hudson, a soldier who later taught at the school; the England rugby player David Marques; and James Brindley Nicolson, a Battle of Britain pilot awarded the Victoria Cross.

The boys' main team sports are football, rugby, and cricket.

==== Derwent Lodge ====
Derwent Lodge is the prep section for girls aged 7 to 11 (Years 3 to 6). Its four houses, Coniston, Grasmere, Ullswater, and Windermere, are named after lakes in the Lake District.

The girls' main team sports are hockey, netball, and cricket.

== Curriculum and activities ==
From Year 3 pupils study subjects including English, mathematics, science, French, Latin, history, geography, engineering, and philosophy, religion and ethics, following the Pre-Senior Baccalaureate curriculum. Pupils are set by ability in mathematics from Year 4 and in English from Year 5, and classes have a maximum of 18 pupils. Outdoor learning is a feature throughout the school, including the Saplings outdoor programme for nursery children.

Engineering is taught as a timetabled subject from Year 3, with projects including model racing cars, robotics, and electronics; school teams have reached the national final of the STEM Racing competition.

Nearly 350 pupils have weekly lessons with the school's 20 visiting music teachers, and the school orchestra has about 60 members. Pupils have qualified for the national IAPS finals in athletics, cross country, judo, and swimming. Team sports include football, rugby, cricket, netball, and hockey, alongside cross country, swimming, athletics, and tennis.

== Facilities ==
Since the schools' arrival, additions to the site have included classrooms and art rooms in the mansion's top floor (1998), the reinstated central span between the stable courtyards (2000), a multi-purpose sports hall (2002), a synthetic grass pitch (2003), and a dining hall and indoor swimming pool built within the former walled garden (2008 to 2009). The sports hall is named Bickmore Hall, and the pool is 25 metres (82 ft) long. The school also has a purpose-built music block and an engineering laboratory. The grounds extend to about 150 acres (61 ha).

== Leavers' destinations ==
All girls and about a third of boys leave at the end of Year 6, many for local grammar schools such as Tunbridge Wells Girls' Grammar School, Tonbridge Grammar School, Weald of Kent Grammar School, The Judd School, and The Skinners' School, or for Bennett Memorial Diocesan School. Of the 64 pupils who left Year 6 in July 2026, 40 per cent went on to grammar schools and 51 per cent to independent senior schools. Boys who stay to 13 most often move on to independent schools including Tonbridge School, Sutton Valence School, Bede's School, and Sevenoaks School.
