= Somerhill House =

Grade I listed country house in UK

Somerhill
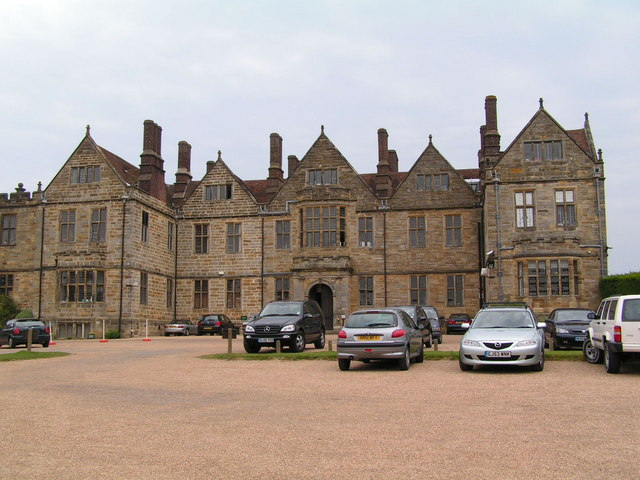
- Somerhill House, June 2006

- Location within Kent
- Former names: Somer Hill; Summerhill; Summer Hill

General information
- Architectural style: Jacobean
- Location: Somerhill, Tonbridge, Kent, TN11 0NJ, Tudeley, Kent, United Kingdom
- Coordinates: 51°10′59″N 0°18′00″E
- Current tenants: The Schools at Somerhill
- Construction started: 1611
- Completed: c1613
- Renovated: 1879–97, 1988–91
- Owner: The Schools at Somerhill Charitable Trust

Technical details
- Floor count: Three

Design and construction
- Architect: John Thorpe

Renovating team
- Architects: Fielden and Mawson (1988–1991)
- Renovating firm: R. Durtnell & Sons (1988–1991)

Somerhill House (/ˈsʌmərhɪl/ SUM-ər-hil) is a Jacobean mansion situated near Tonbridge, Kent, United Kingdom. The Grade I listed structure was built for The 4th Earl of Clanricarde in 1611–1613. The estate was sequestrated by Parliament in 1645, and restored to its rightful owner in 1660. The building had become derelict by the mid-eighteenth century but was later restored. Somerhill was painted by Turner in 1811. It was bought by a member of the Goldsmid family in 1849 and greatly extended between 1879 and 1897, making it the second largest house in Kent, after Knole House, Sevenoaks.

Somerhill housed a Prisoner of War camp, Prisoner of War Camp No. 40, during the Second World War, following which it became the home of the d'Avigdor-Goldsmids and was visited by many celebrities of the time. Somerhill was sold by the d'Avigdor-Goldsmids in 1980, and again went into decline, being damaged by vandalism and storms. In 1993, The Schools at Somerhill moved in, as of July 2026 the building is used as a school.

== Location ==
Somerhill House lies 1 1/2 miles (2.4 km) south of Tonbridge at grid reference TQ 6086 4510, in the civil parish of Tudeley-cum-Capel, which falls under Tunbridge Wells Borough Council.

== Description ==
Somerhill is built of sandstone. The stone also contains iron, which gives it a red colour. This stone is known as Calverley Stone. The house is in the shape of a letter "H", with the main hall forming the bar of the "H". The main elevation of the house faces west. The building is three storeys high, with a half-basement. It has five gables on the main elevation. The roof is of an A-frame construction, clad in Kentish peg tiles. The south wing houses the library, the second longest room in Kent at 93 feet (28 m) long, exceeded only by the Gallery at Knole House, Sevenoaks. The main staircase is in the south wing. The north wing housed service rooms and the kitchen, with a parlour at the rear.

As built, the house measured almost 100 feet (30 m) in depth internally. The hall measures 23 feet (7.0 m) by 47 feet (14.3 m). To its north was a 22 feet (6.7 m) by 25 feet (7.6 m) drawing room. The dining room, located to the right of the hall measured 22 feet (6.7 m) by 33 feet (10 m). As extended, Somerhill provides around 49,000 square feet (4,600 m^{2}) of floorspace.

The house shows the transition from medieval architecture, in which the hall was the main living and entertaining room, to the more modern plan, where the hall became a reception room. Somerhill is one of the earliest examples of this. When built, this was an innovative design.

== History ==
=== 17th century ===
The land that Somerhill was built on originally formed part of the estate of South Frith, one of two deer parks in the Lowey of Tonbridge. At one time the estate covered 6,500 acres (2,600 ha). Built on the site of an earlier mansion, and designed by John Thorpe, the house was built between 1611 and 1613, dates which are to be found on the surviving leaden rainwater heads. Somerhill was built for The 4th Earl of Clanricarde, an Anglo-Irish nobleman. The design was based on that of the Villa Valmarana, Lisiera, Italy, which was designed by Palladio.

Lord Clanricarde died in 1636, and Somerhill passed to his son Ulick, 5th Earl of Clanricarde (1604-1657), who was created The 1st Marquess of Clanricarde (the first of what eventually would be three creations of this title, as it was to turn out) in 1646. Following the Battle of Naseby in 1645, Somerhill was sequestrated by Parliament, which gave it to The 3rd Earl of Essex, the half-brother of Ulick, Lord Clanricarde. On his death in September 1646, Parliament gave Somerhill to John Bradshaw. John Evelyn, who visited Somerhill on 29 May 1652, described Somerhill as "situated on an eminent hill, with a park, but has nothing else extraordinary".

Following the Restoration of Charles II to the throne in 1660, Somerhill was given to Margaret, Viscountess Muskerry, the daughter of The 1st Marquess of Clanricarde. Lady Muskerry had extravagant tastes, and gradually sold off much of the lands of South Frith to various people. She died in 1698, and Somerhill passed to her son, John Villiers, who styled himself the Earl of Buckingham. Villers sold the Manor of South Frith to one Dekins. Some 1,200 acres (490 ha) of grounds was sold separately to Abraham Hill of Sutton at Hone, Kent. Somerhill itself had been let to a warrener.

=== 18th century ===
Dekins sold Somerhill to one Cave, who sold it in 1712 to John Woodgate of Penshurst. Woodgate lived in the house, and on his death it passed to his son Henry, who lived at Somerhill until 1769, and then within the town of Tonbridge until his death in 1787. On 5 August 1752, the house was visited by Horace Walpole, who described its setting as commanding "a vast landscape, beautifully wooded and has quantities of large old trees to shelter itself". By 1766, Somerhill was in a "ruinous" state. It was to remain derelict throughout the century. In 1787, Somerhill passed to William Woodgate, who was Henry Woodgate's nephew and had been living at Somerhill. In 1792, Woodgate was one of three partners who set up The Tonbridge Bank.

=== 19th century ===
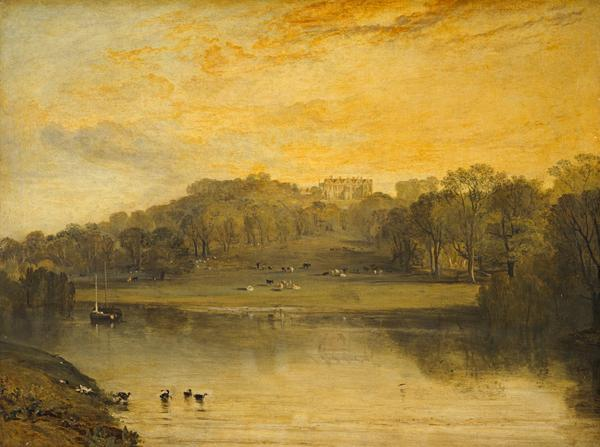
Somer Hill, Tonbridge by J.M.W. Turner, 1811

In the spring of 1810, J. M. W. Turner made a drawing of Somerhill, and then in 1811 he painted it for the Woodgates, choosing a view across the lake in the grounds, with the house in the distance. The painting Somer Hill, Tonbridge, which was exhibited at the Royal Academy's Exhibition of 1811, is now in the National Galleries of Scotland, and the sketchbook containing his earlier drawing is at the Tate.

Following the end of the Napoleonic Wars and the subsequent agricultural depression, coupled with the collapse of the Tonbridge Bank in 1812, Woodgate was declared bankrupt in 1816. In that year, Woodgate offered Somerhill for sale to the Duke of Wellington, who declined to buy it as the foxhunting was not good enough for his liking. Somerhill was bought from the descendants of William Woodgate in November 1819 by James Alexander, MP. By 1830, Somerhill had been substantially repaired, and new landscaping was undertaken. In 1832, Anthony Salvin was engaged to make improvements to the house, but retaining its original style. During the severe winter of 1835–36, skating was possible on the lake at Somerhill for four weeks.

In 1842, Tonbridge Priory was demolished to make way for the building of the first railway station. A stone coffin from the priory was bought by Alexander and taken to Somerhill, where it can still be seen. In 1849, Somerhill was bought by Sir Isaac Goldsmid, who passed it on to his son Frederick in 1859.

The lake at Somerhill, which Turner had painted in 1811, was used to supply ice for the house, as a watering place for the estate's cattle, and for recreational boating. The lake was fed by the Calverley Stream, which flowed through the grounds of Somerhill. In 1860, the stream became polluted by sewage discharged upstream from a sewage works owned by the Tunbridge Wells Improvement Commissioners, rendering the water in the lake unfit for use. Frederick Goldsmid tried to get the Commissioners to stop fouling the stream, but they refused to act and the situation worsened. Finally, in 1865, Goldsmid sued the Commissioners. They denied responsibility, claiming that the pollution was not caused by their sewage works but by a farm downstream. The court rejected their claim and ruled in Goldsmid's favor.

In 1866, Somerhill passed to Frederick's son Sir Julian Goldsmid (later known as d'Avigdor-Goldsmid). Sir Julian returned the house to something nearer its original condition. In 1879, Somerhill was extended as more room was needed to accommodate Goldsmid's large family – he had eight daughters. The stable courtyard was rebuilt at this time, with the date 1879 being cast in the rainwater heads. The building work took until 1897 to complete. The expansion made Somerhill the second largest house in Kent, after Knole House, Sevenoaks. Somerhill House itself covers an area of 2½ acres (1 ha).

A ghost in the form of a lady in white is said to haunt the Julian staircase, located in the Victorian part of the house. D'Avigdor-Goldsmid allowed people to drive their carriages through the grounds of Somerhill, although the house was not open to the public. Sir Julian died in 1896, and Somerhill passed to Sir Osmond d'Avigdor-Goldsmid.

=== 20th century ===
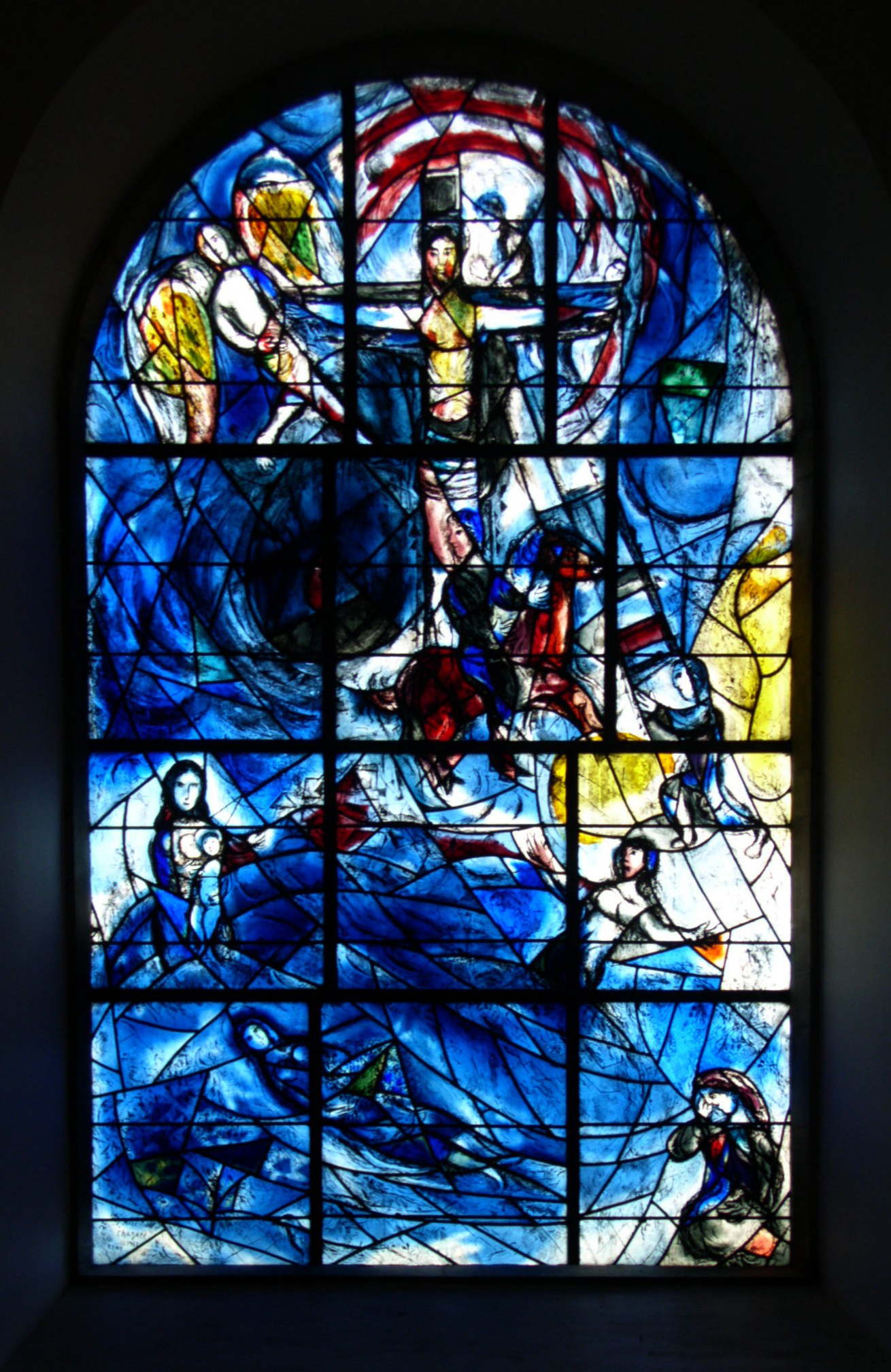
Memorial window to Sarah d'Avigdor-Goldsmid in All Saints Church, Tudeley

In 1912, there was an army camp held in the grounds of Somerhill. The soldiers were housed in bell tents. On Sir Osmond's death in 1940, it then passed to his eldest son Sir Henry. During the Second World War, Somerhill was the site of a Prisoner of War camp, known as POW Camp No. 40. Italian POWs were amongst those housed at Somerhill. The Army were in possession of Somerhill from 1940 to 1949. Squatters occupied some of the 40-plus huts in 1948, they were locked in by the Colonel in charge of the camp at the time.

Post-war, the house was the scene of much lavish entertaining. Lady Rosemary d'Avigdor-Goldsmid likened it to a hotel, "except that the guests didn't pay!" Amongst the distinguished visitors were John Betjeman, Hugh Casson, David Niven and Enoch Powell. The house was listed on 20 October 1954. It is assessed as Grade I. On 19 September 1963, the d'Avigdor-Goldsmid's daughter Sarah was drowned in an accident, which occurred off Rye, East Sussex. Artist Marc Chagall was commissioned to design a set of stained glass windows in All Saints' Church, Tudeley, in her memory.

In 1976, Somerhill passed to Sir Henry's surviving daughter Chloe, who lived at Hadlow Place Farm, Hadlow. She sold Somerhill in 1981 and it was sold thrice more in the next eight years. A sale of the contents of Somerhill was held by Sotheby's on 23 and 24 June 1981. It was bought by Mr and Mrs Watts who opened it for weddings parties etc. Somerhill was advertised for sale in May 1984 at a price in excess of £1,500,000. Beginning in 1988, the house was extensively restored with assistance from English Heritage. The works were undertaken by R. Durtnell & Sons of Brasted, who celebrated their 400th anniversary in 1991 with a party held at Somerhill as the restoration was completed. Fielden and Mawson were the architects for the work.

In 1993, The Schools at Somerhill moved to Somerhill House, having previously been at Tunbridge Wells. The Schools at Somerhill comprise three schools in one location. Somerhill Pre-Prep is for boys and girls aged 3 – 6. Derwent Lodge is for girls aged 6 – 11 and Yardley Court is for boys aged 6 – 13. In 1998, the attic rooms were converted to provide classrooms and art room. A former granary has also been converted to classrooms, whilst some stables have been converted to workshops. Also in that year, a bridge over the lake in the grounds of Somerhill was added to the Buildings at Risk Register by Tunbridge Wells Borough Council, in whose area Somerhill falls. In 2000, the central span between the old stable courtyard and the stable courtyard was reinstated at a cost of £720,000 to provide accommodation for Somerhill Pre-Prep School and administrative offices. Also in that year, planning permission was granted for the building of a sports hall on the top sports terrace.

=== 21st century ===
The reinstated central span opened in January 2001. The new sports hall was completed in 2002 at a cost of £1,400,000. An artificial turf pitch was added in 2003. In 2004, the bridge over the lake was repaired at a cost of £170,000, aided by a grant of £32,000 from Tunbridge Wells Borough Council. In 2006, planning permission was granted for the conversion of the walled garden into a dining hall and indoor swimming pool. Work began the next year and was completed in January 2009. The dining room and swimming pool were given a Design Award by Tonbridge Civic Society in 2009. As a working school, Somerhill House is not normally open to the public. It has been open as part of Heritage Open Days. Somerhill House was open in 2006, and also in 2010. The grounds of Somerhill contain 152 acres (62 ha) of land.

== Listed buildings ==
The table below shows the status of the various listed buildings in the grounds of Somerhill House.

Description	Grade	Date of listing	Photograph
Somerhill House	I.	20 October 1954.	Somerhill, showing the clock tower
Bridge over the lake	II.	24 August 1990.	The bridge over the lake, Somerhill
Lake Cottage	II.	24 August 1990.	Lake Cottage, Somerhill
Terrace Walls and Sunken Lane	II.	24 August 1990.	The sunken lane, Somerhill

== Sources ==
- Britton, John (1832). Descriptive Sketches of Tunbridge Wells and the Calverley Estate. London: John Britton. (p 120, p 121)
- Burr, Thomas Benge (1766). The History of Tunbridge Wells. Tunbridge Wells: Thomas Benge Burr. (p 233, p 234)
- Clifford, J (1830). Guide of Tunbridge Wells. Tunbridge Wells: J Clifford. (p 154)
- Colbran, John (1840). Colbran's New Guide for Tunbridge Wells. Cornhill, London: A H Bailey & Co. (p 332, p 333, p 334)
- Dale, Antony (1967) [1947]. Fashionable Brighton 1820–1860 (2nd ed.). Newcastle-upon-Tyne: Oriel Press Ltd. ISBN 0-85362-028-8.
- Hasted, Edward (1798). The History and Topographical Survey of the County of Kent, Volume V. Canterbury: W Bristow. (p 235, p 236)
- Neve, Arthur H (1933). The Tonbridge of Yesterday. Tonbridge: Tonbridge Free Press. (p 46, p 47, p 53, p 54, p 360)
- Oswald, Arthur (1933). Country Houses of Kent. London: Country Life Ltd. (p 41, p 42)
- Robertson, Maxwell Alexander (1900). English reports annotated, 1866-1900, Volume 1.
- Thomson, J Radford (1883). Pelton's Illustrated Guide to Tunbridge Wells. Tunbridge Wells: Richard Pelton. (p 173, p 174)
