= All Saints Church, Tudeley =

Church in Kent, England

All Saints Church
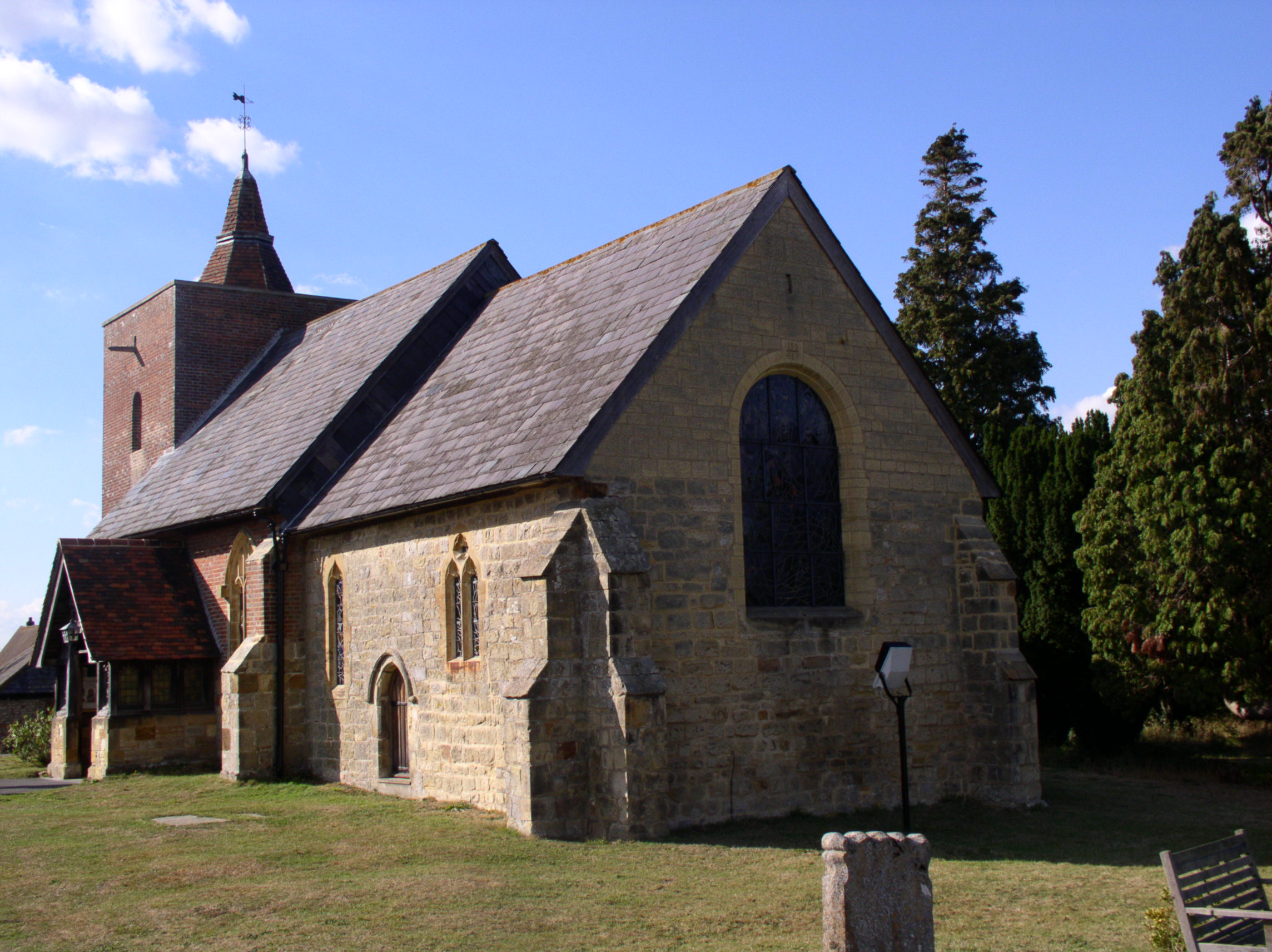
- All Saints Church
- 51.1848°N 0.3185°E
- OS grid reference: TQ 62130 45395
- Location: Tudeley, Kent
- Country: England
- Denomination: Church of England

History
- Status: Open
- Founded: 12th century

Administration
- Diocese: Rochester
- Parish: Tudeley

All Saints Church in Tudeley, Kent, England, is the only church in the world that has all its windows in stained glass designed by Marc Chagall.

== History ==
A place of worship has existed in Tudeley since the seventh century, then one of only four in the Weald. The sandstone footings of the nave and tower may date from before the Norman Conquest of 1066, and the church is listed in the Domesday Book of 1086 under the village's alternative name of Tivedale. In 1293 the church was given to Tonbridge Priory. The majority of the existing structure was created in the later medieval period, during the 13th and 14th centuries. After the Dissolution of the Monasteries in 1526, it came under the control of Christ Church, Oxford, and then in 1529 became controlled by the Crown, before returning to private hands in 1548. Today it is part of the Diocese of Rochester.

== Restoration ==
The structure was extensively restored and renovated from the late 18th century, rebuilt in red Flemish bond brick at a cost of £1,125. Much of the earlier stone shell of the chancel survived, as well as the lower walls of the nave and west tower. Three bells were also cast at this time and hung in the tower, and the roof topped with blue slate. The extant brick tower was constructed in 1765 and in 1798 the church was described as being rebuilt. In 1871–1875 Robert Medley Fulford rebuilt the nave and added the north aisle in Bath stone, and in 1885 the chancel arch was constructed and the 1571 Fane monument restored. The monument is to George Fane (1512–1572) Sheriff of Kent in 1557–1558, son of Richard Fane by his wife Agnes Stidulf, the daughter and heiress of Henry Stidulf of Badsell, the son of Thomas Stidulf and his wife Marion Badsell, whose monumental brass is in the chancel.

== Windows ==
On 19 September 1963, Sarah the daughter of Sir Henry and Lady D'Avigdor-Goldsmid who owned nearby Somerhill House, was drowned in a sailing accident off Rye, East Sussex. In her memory, the couple commissioned the Belarusian-French artist Marc Chagall to design a stained glass window for the church; it was installed in 1967. When Chagall arrived for the dedication of the east window in 1967, and saw the church for the first time, he exclaimed "C'est magnifique! Je les ferai tous!" ("It's magnificent! I will do them all!") Over the next ten years Chagall designed the remaining eleven windows in watercolour; these were again made in collaboration with the glassworker Charles Marq in his workshop at Reims in northern France. The windows were all installed by 1985 and in the following order: the Memorial Window in the altar wall, the five north windows (nos 1 to 5) and the two south windows (nos 11 and 12) dedicated in 1974. Installing the four chancel windows (nos. 6, 7, 9, 10) meant removing the Victorian memorial glass and so was controversial, but in 1985 these last Chagall windows were dedicated and installed, their predecessors being moved to the vestry at the back of the church, just before Chagall's death.

The 12 stained glass windows by Marc Chagall

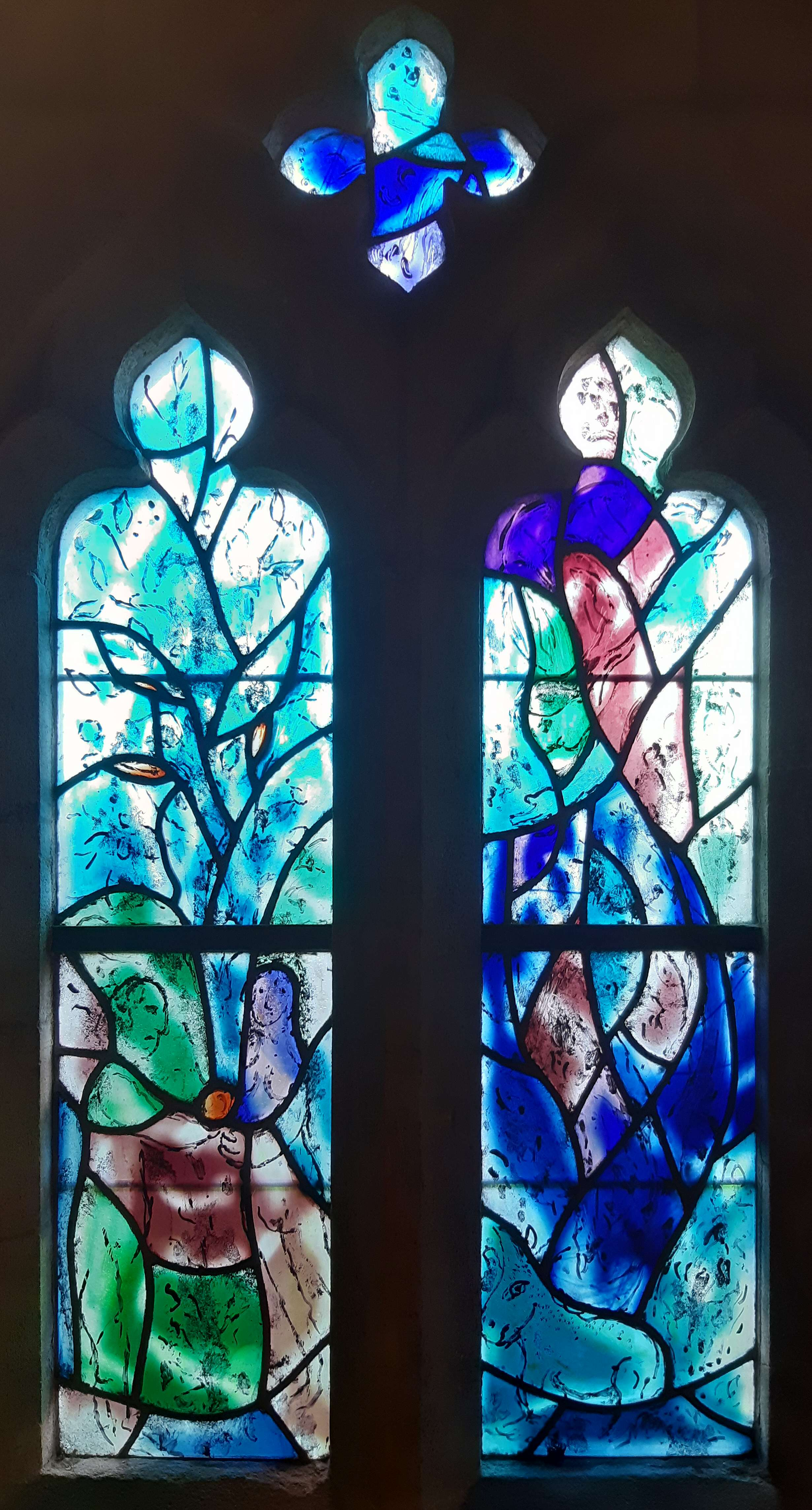
Window 1, Eve offering Adam the forbidden fruit

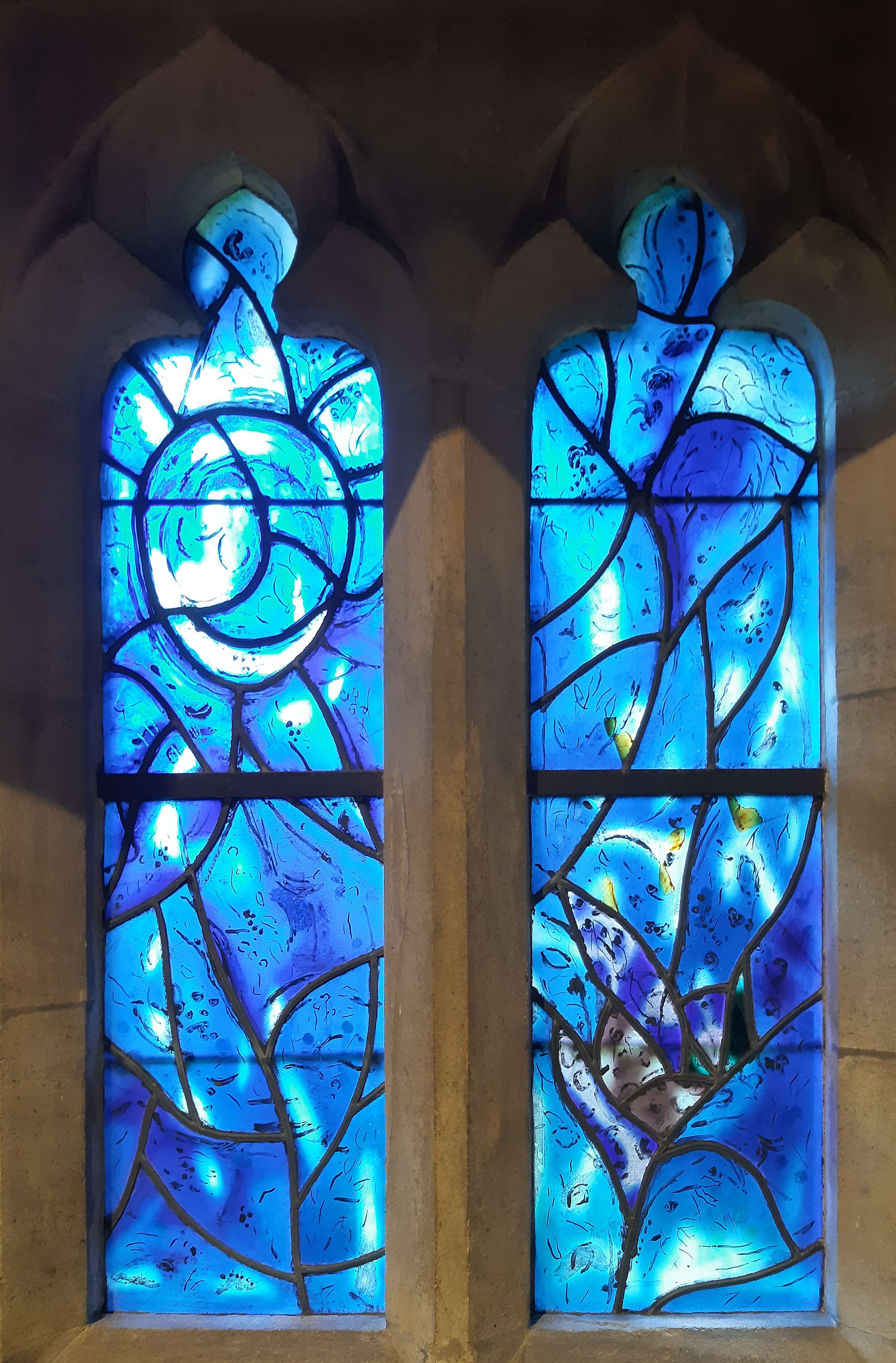
Window 2, deep blue with crescent moon

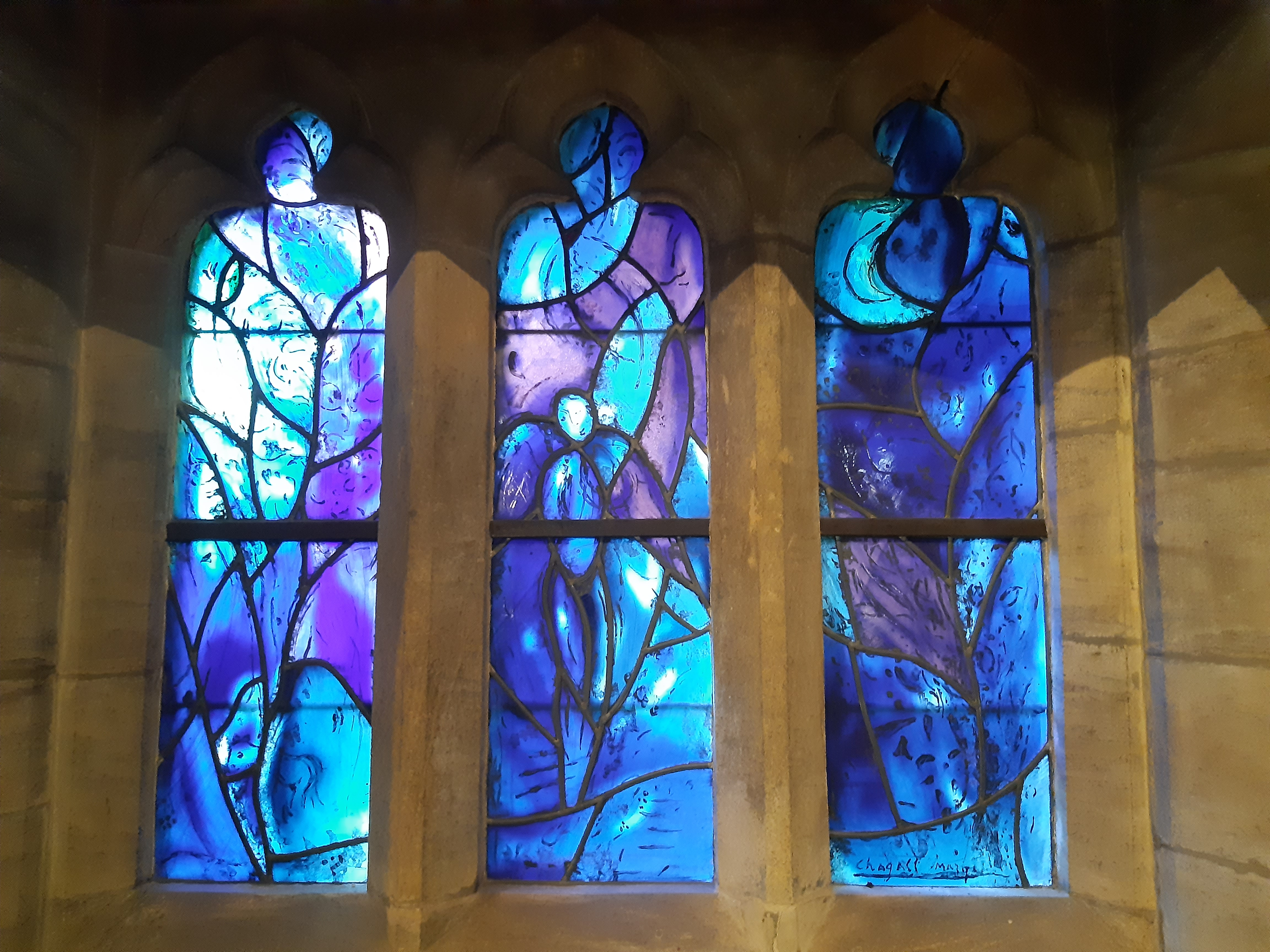
Window 3, deep blue with green leaf, angel, moon

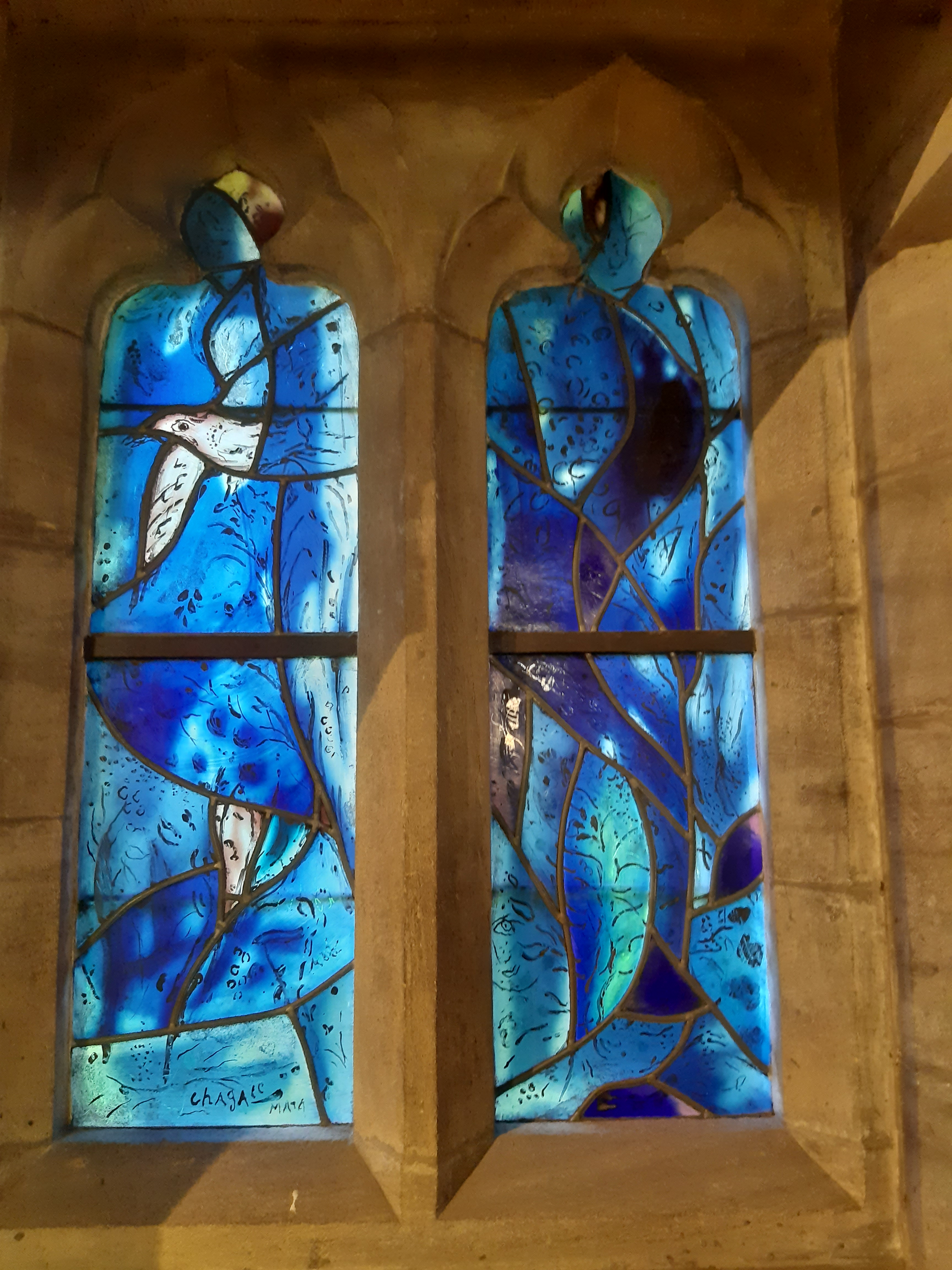
Window 4, deep blue with white bird

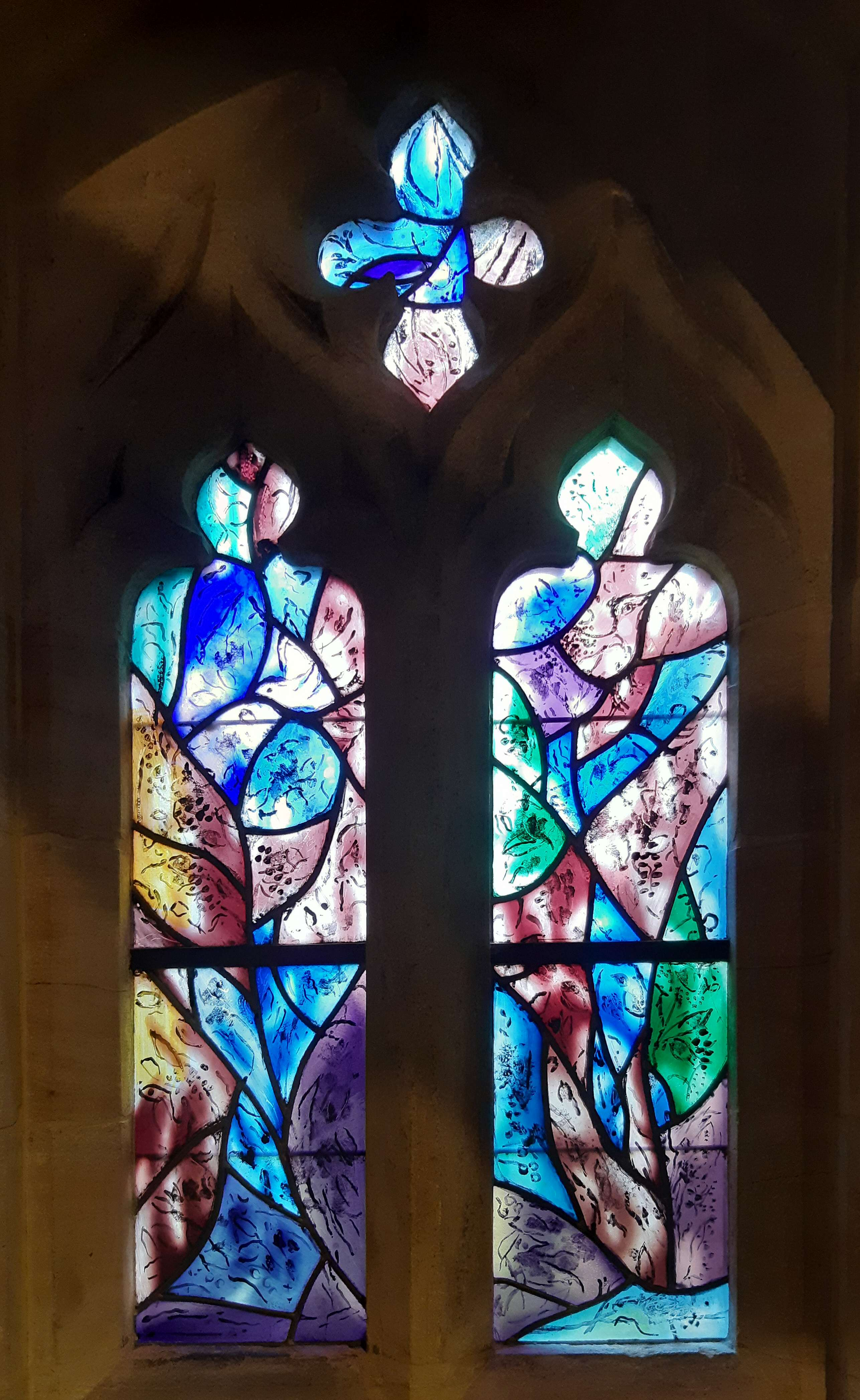
Window 5, warm colours, a blue fish in the quatrefoil

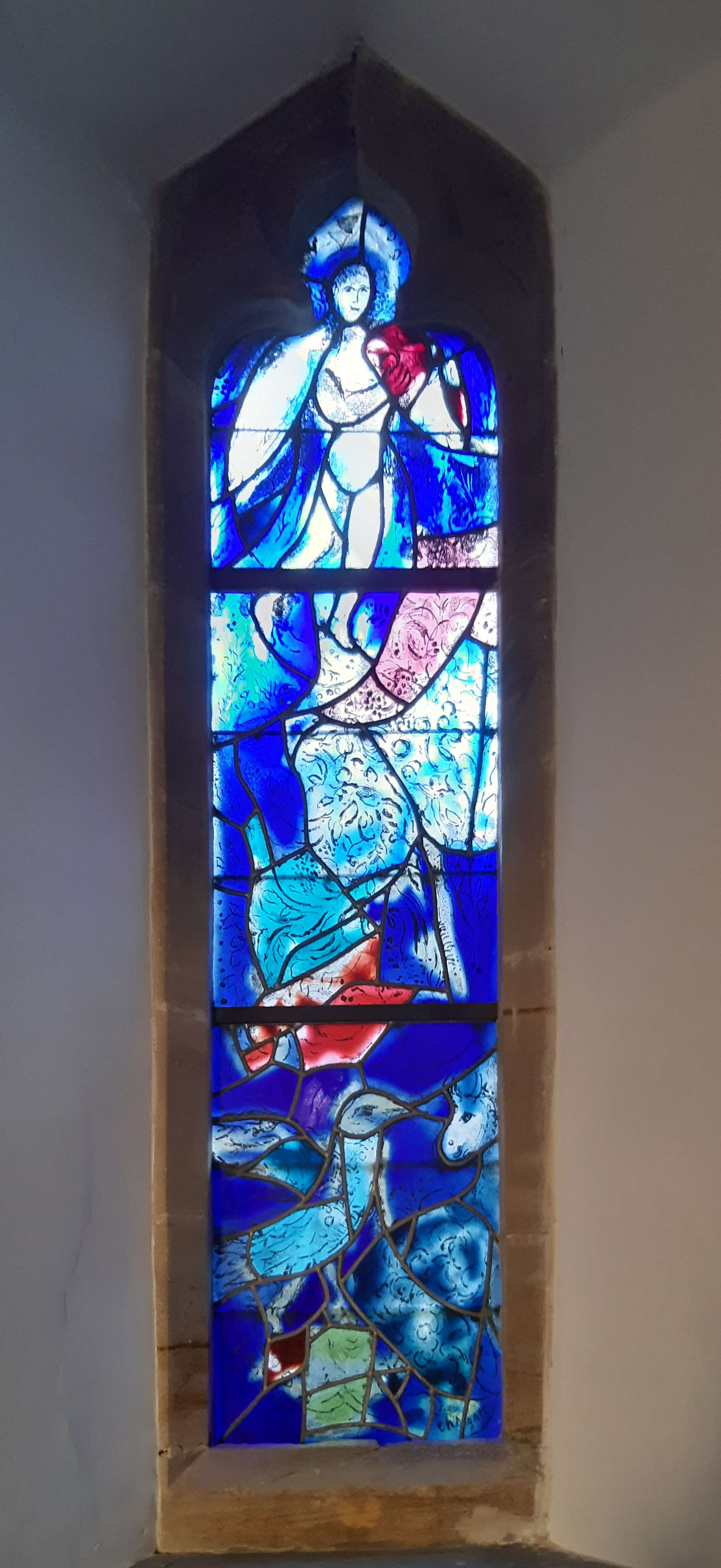
Window 6, angel with harp, bird, and donkey

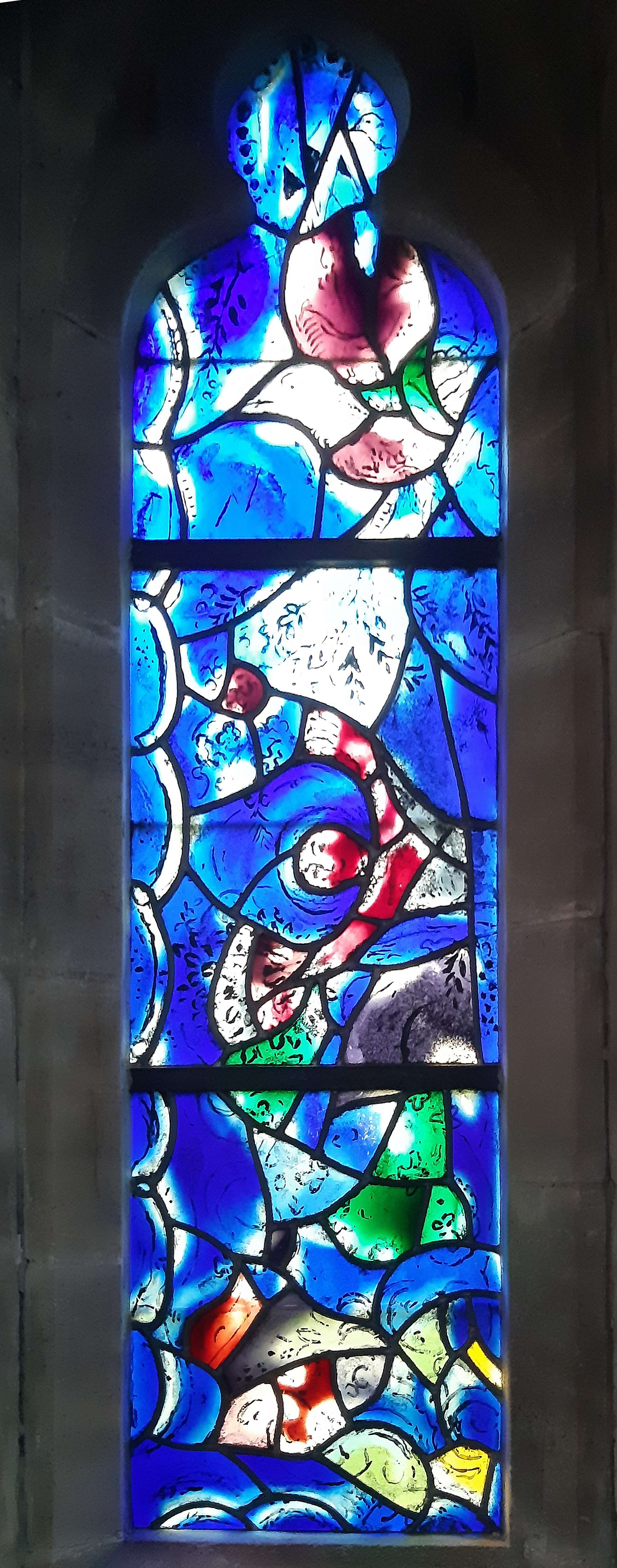
Window 7, a red tumbling angel, bird

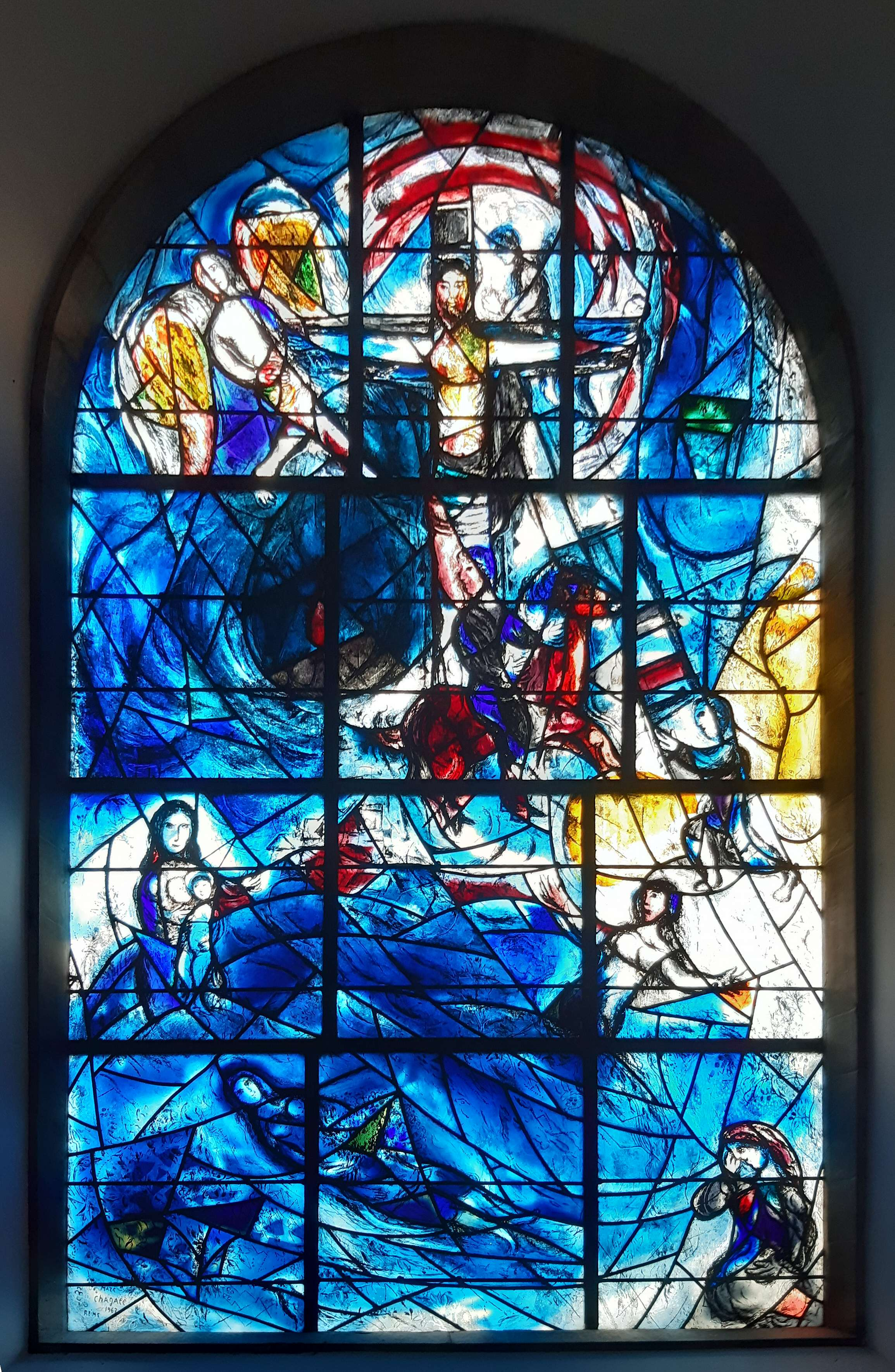
Window 8, the East or Memorial Window for Sarah d'Avigdor Goldsmid, drowned aged 21

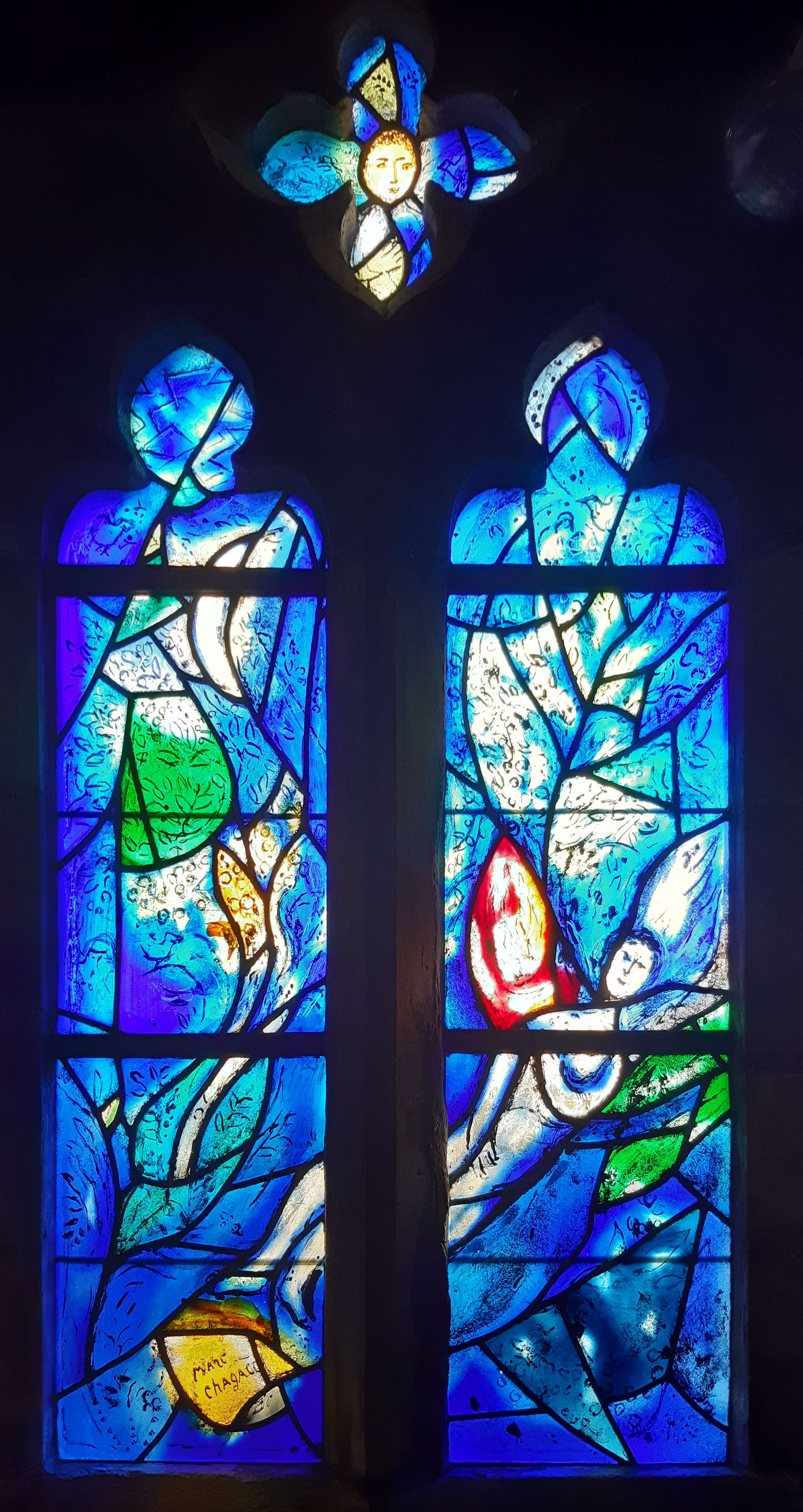
Window 9, a serene angel, signed Marc Chagall

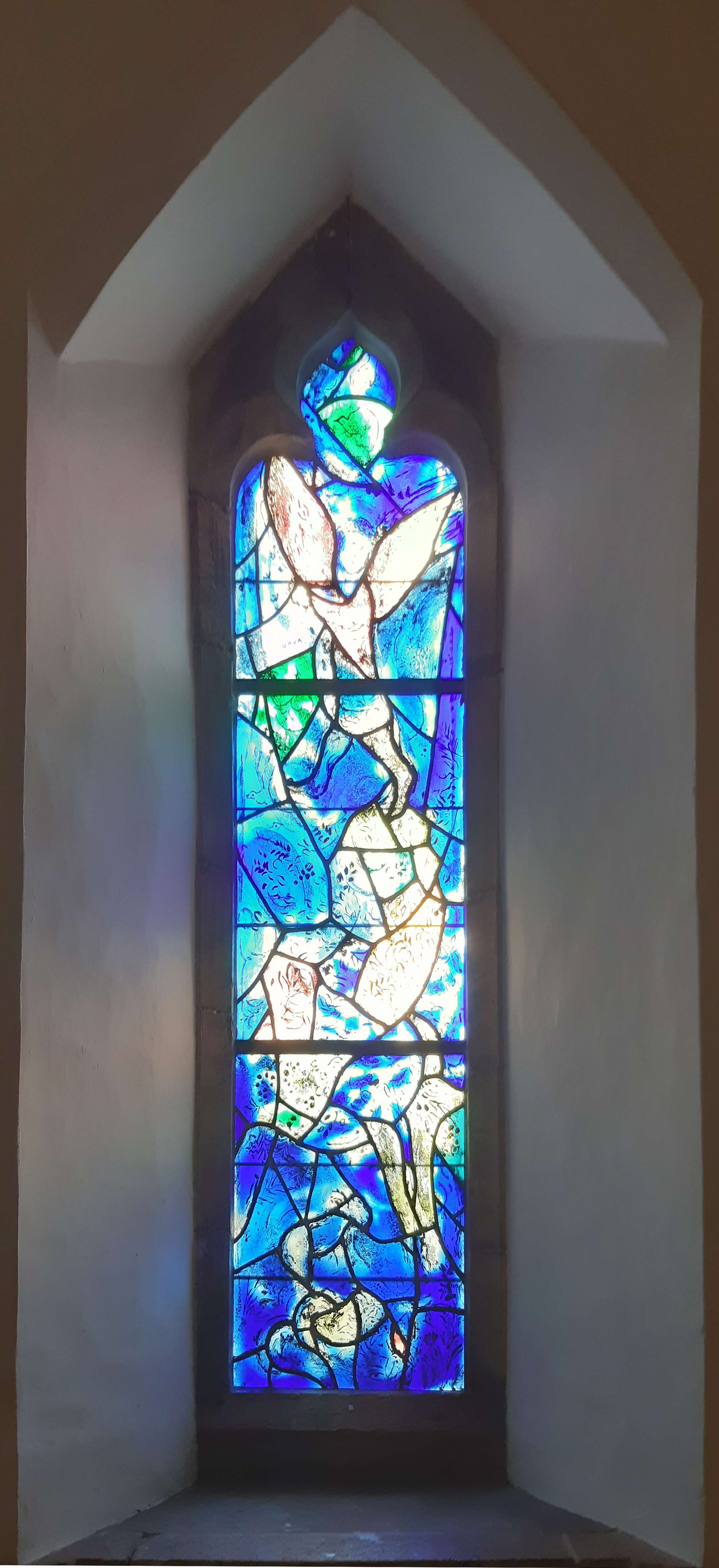
Window 10, angel and 'Vava', his nickname for his wife

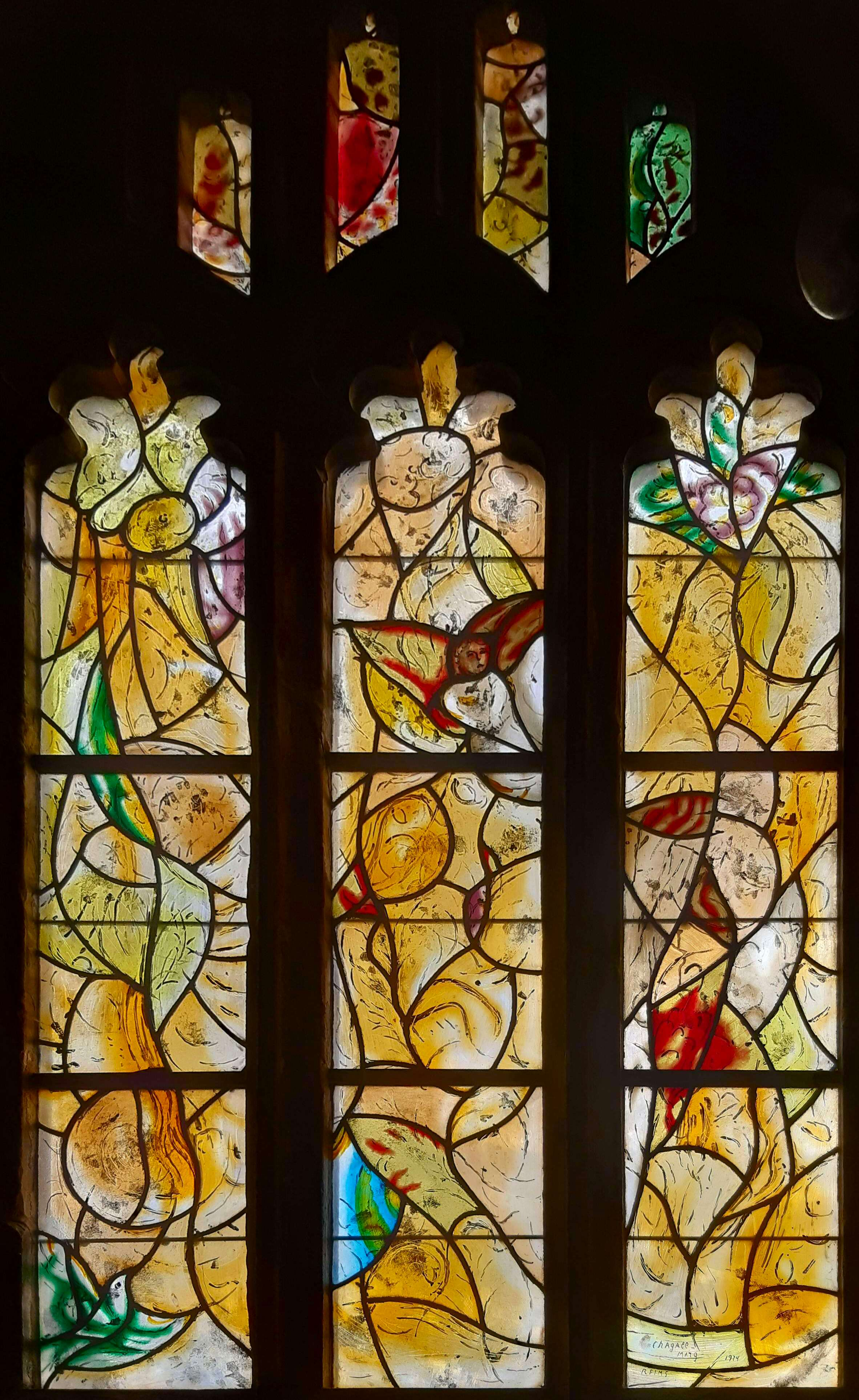
Window 11, resurrection, small angel, green bird, four candles at top

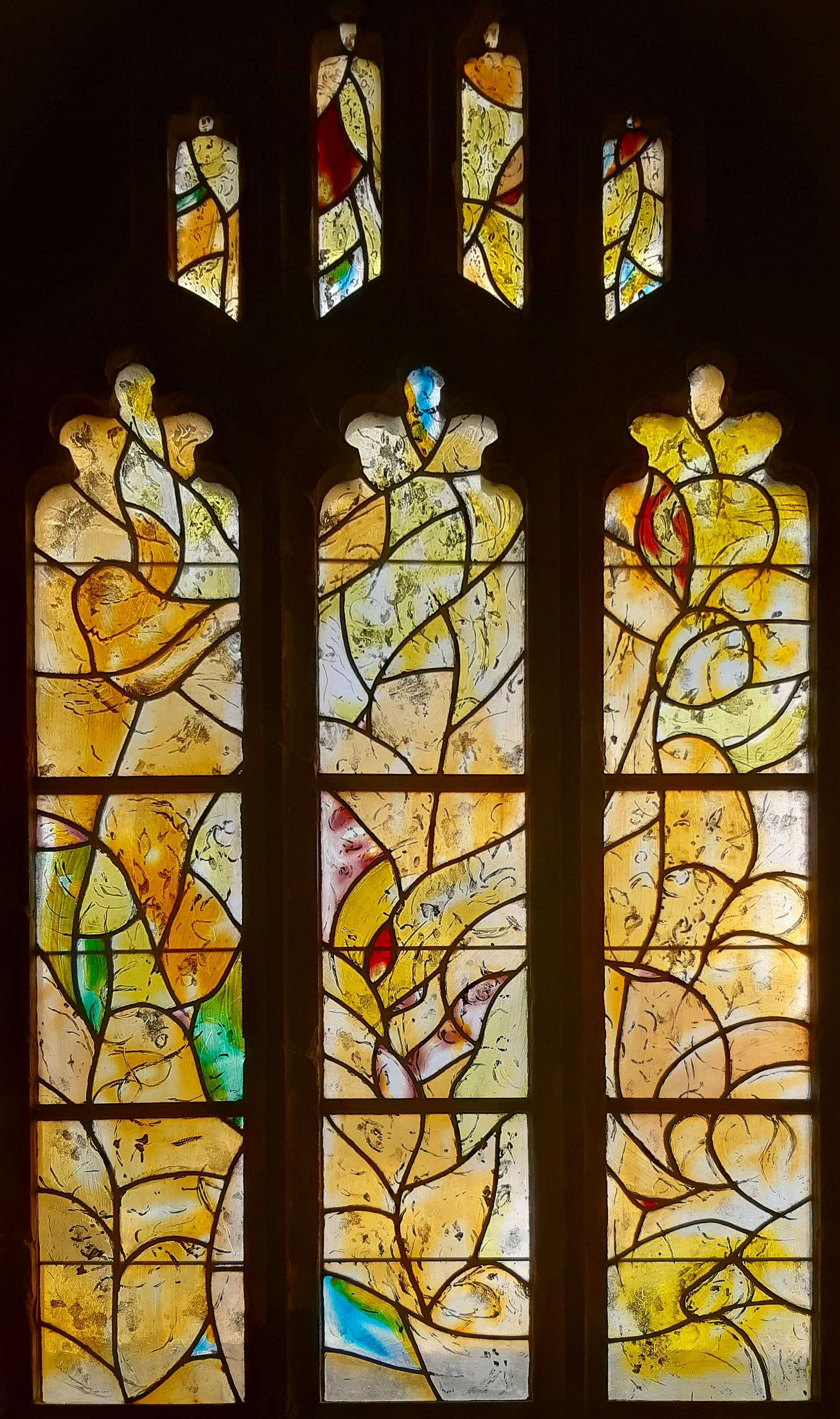
Window 12, resurrection, birds, donkey, four candles at top
Windows in context

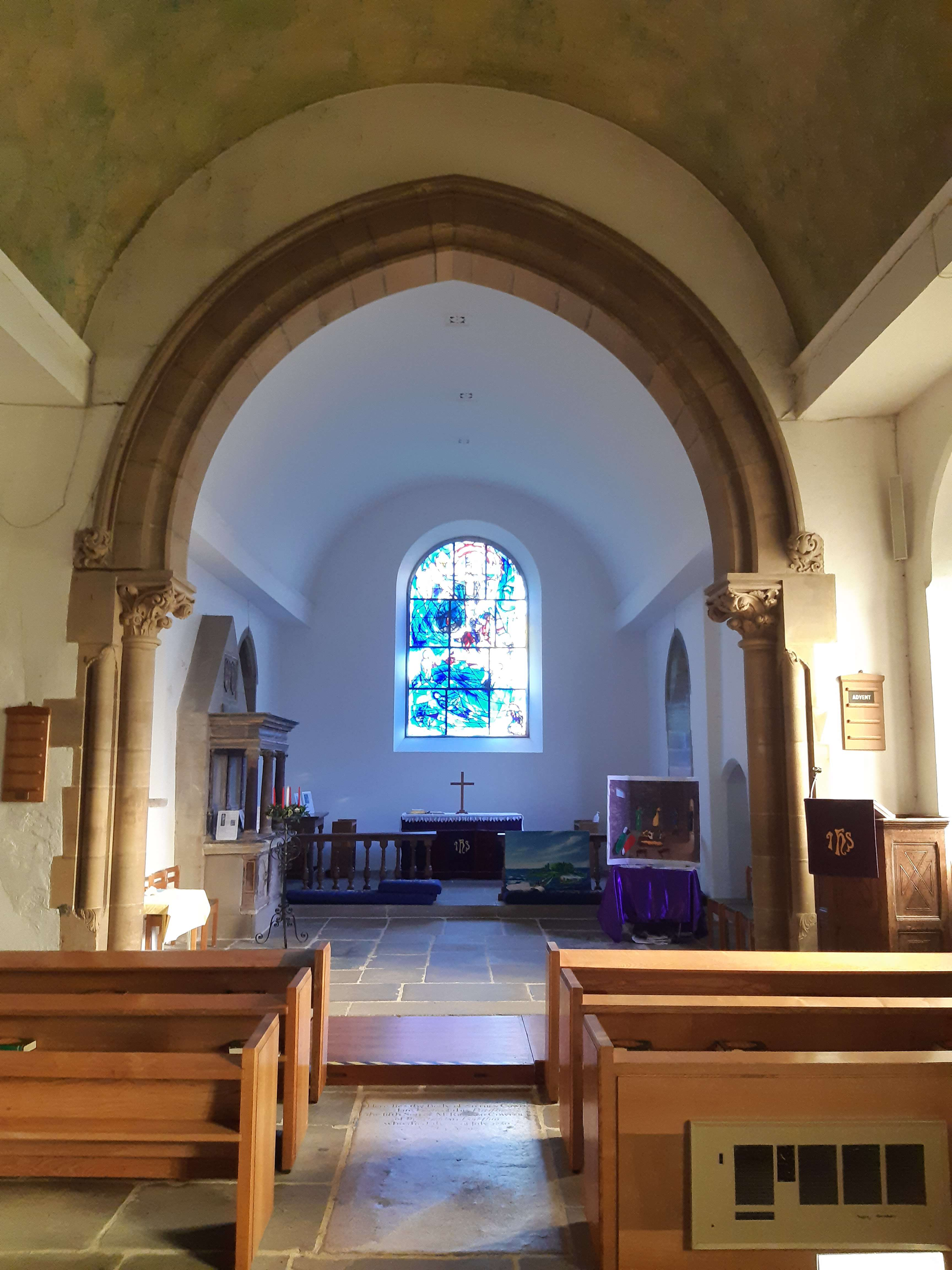
Nave and chancel

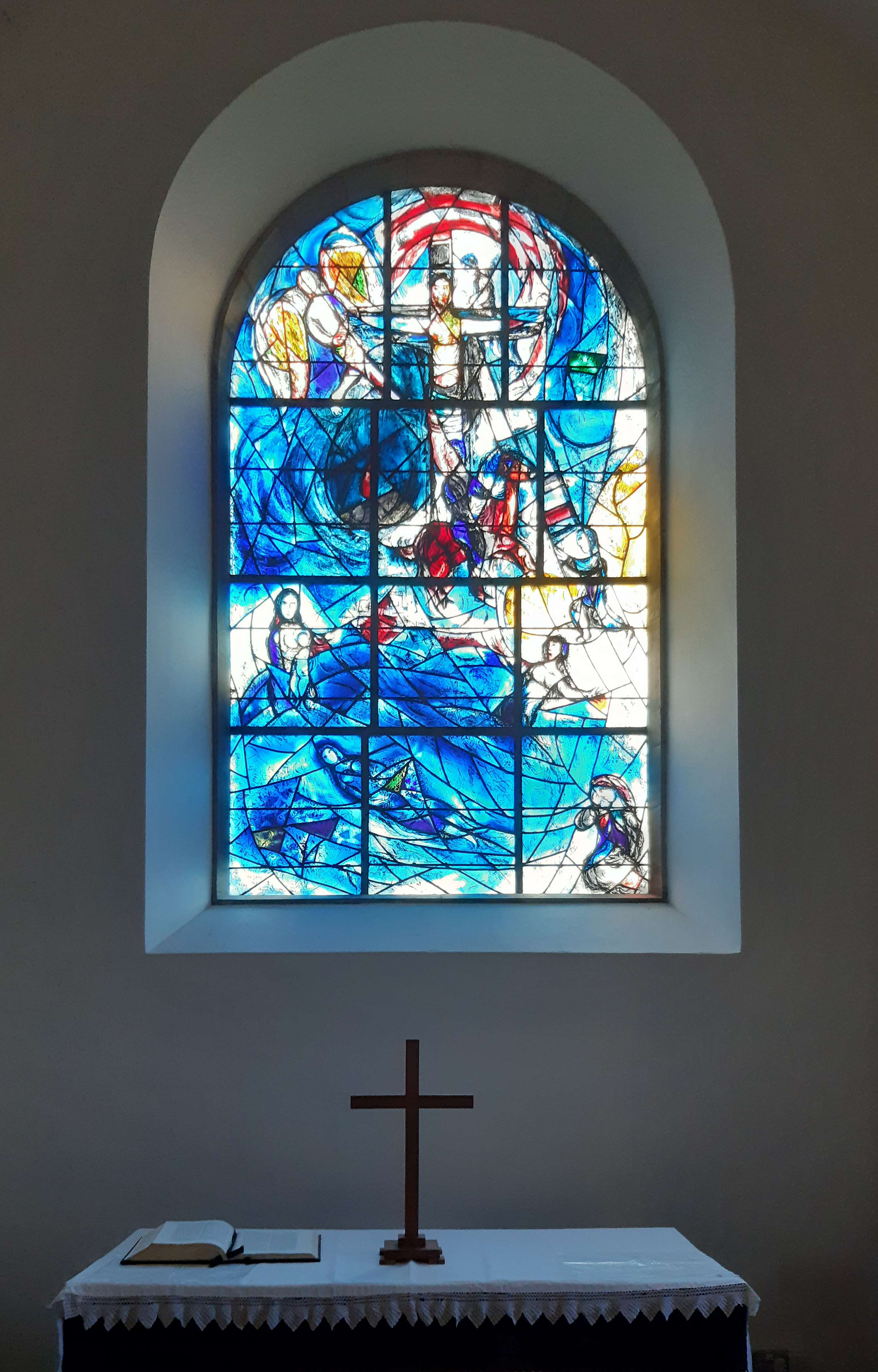
Altar and East Window

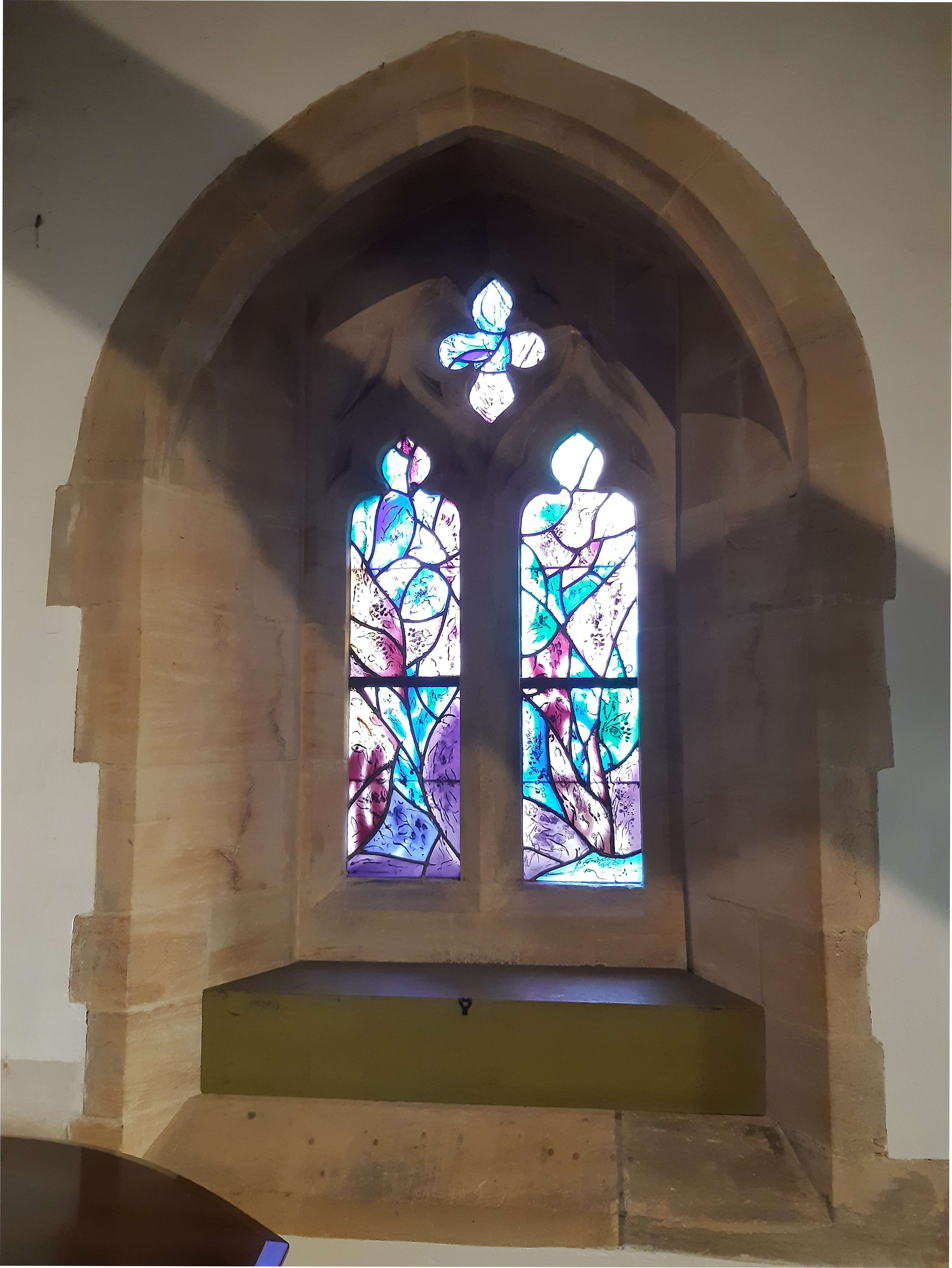
Stone surround of Window 5; it is on the north side, but it faces east

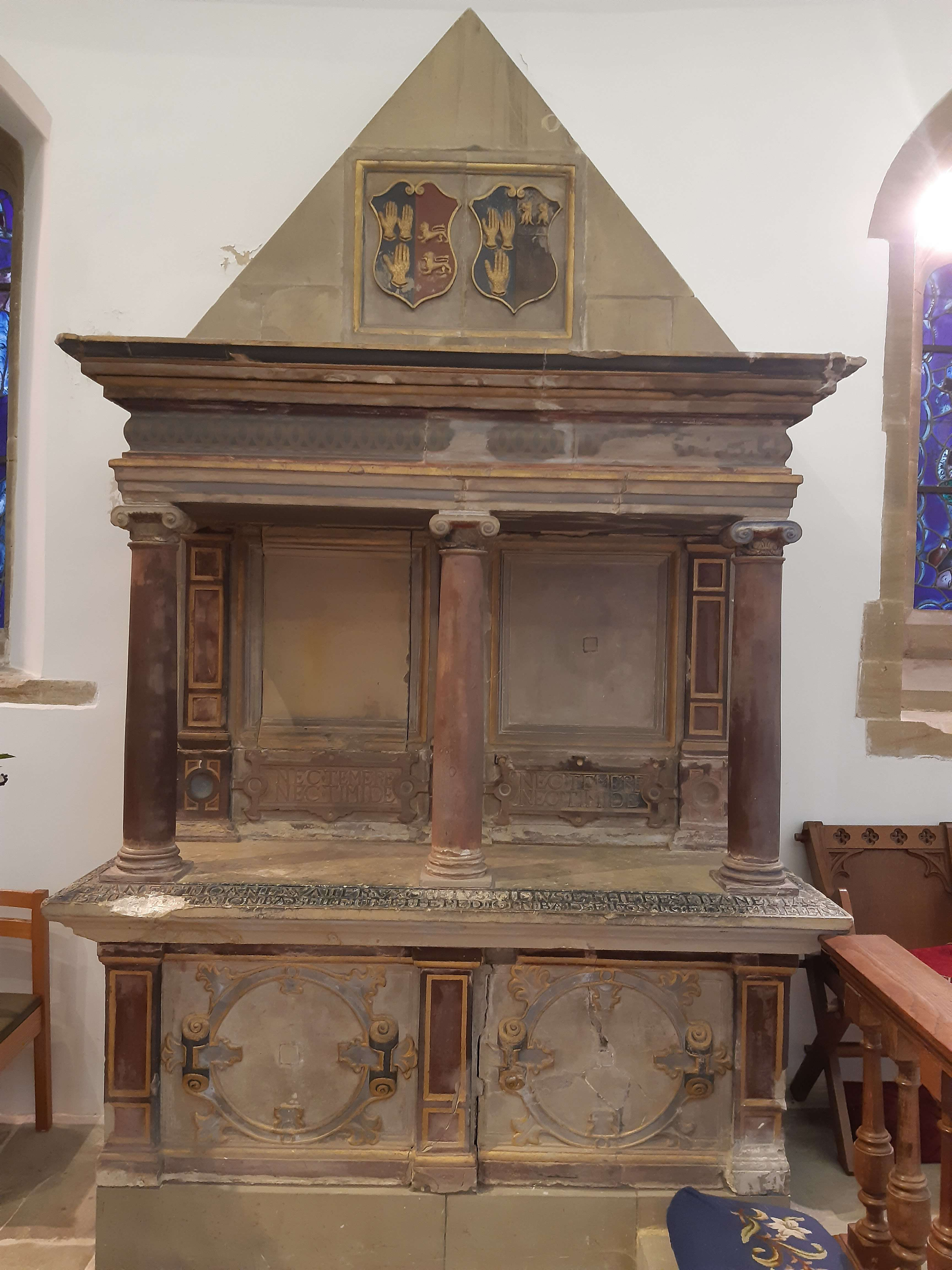
Memorial to George Fane, Sheriff of Kent, in the chancel

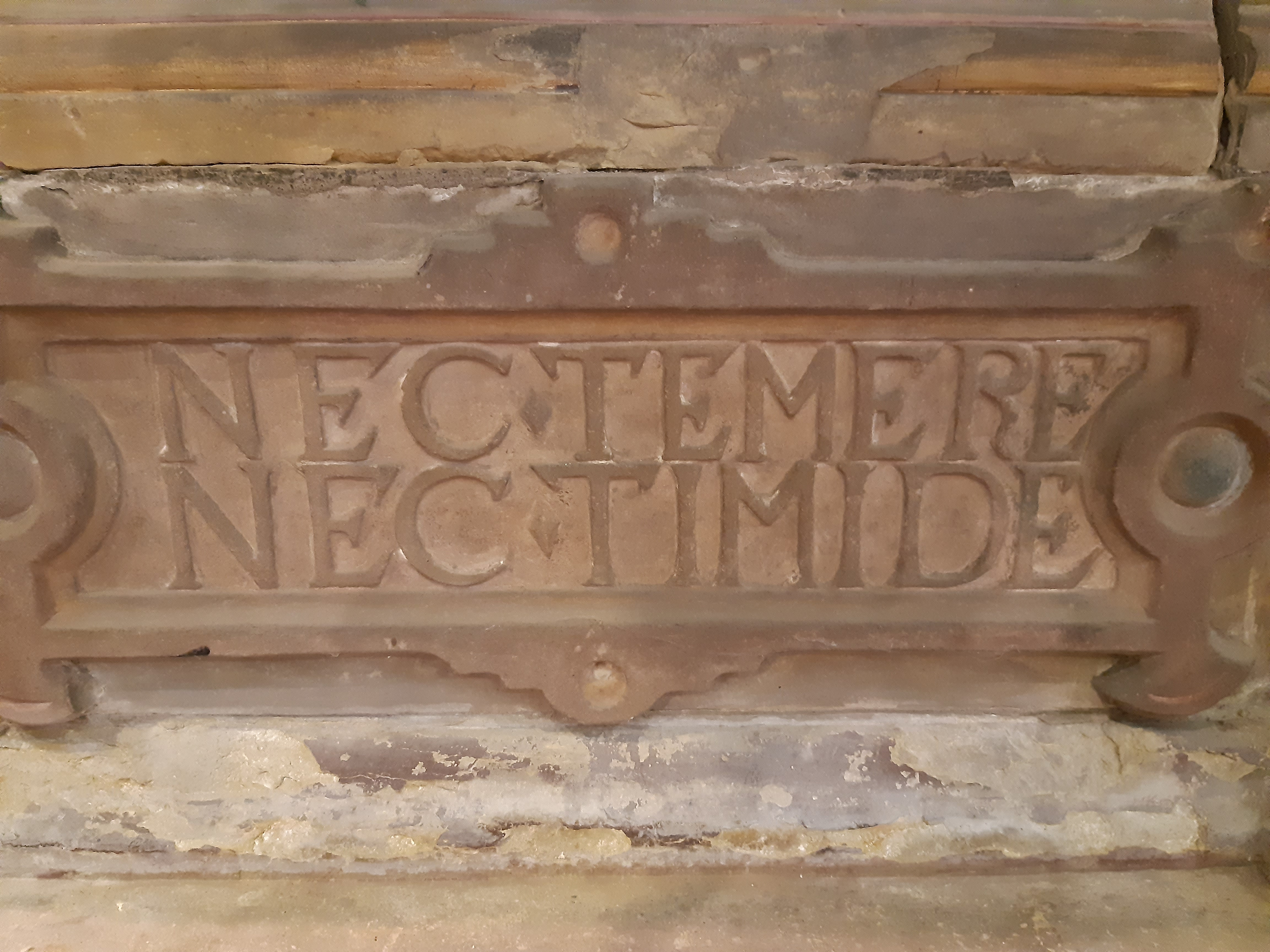
Detail of inscription on Fane Memorial Nec Temere Nec Timide
Enlarged window details

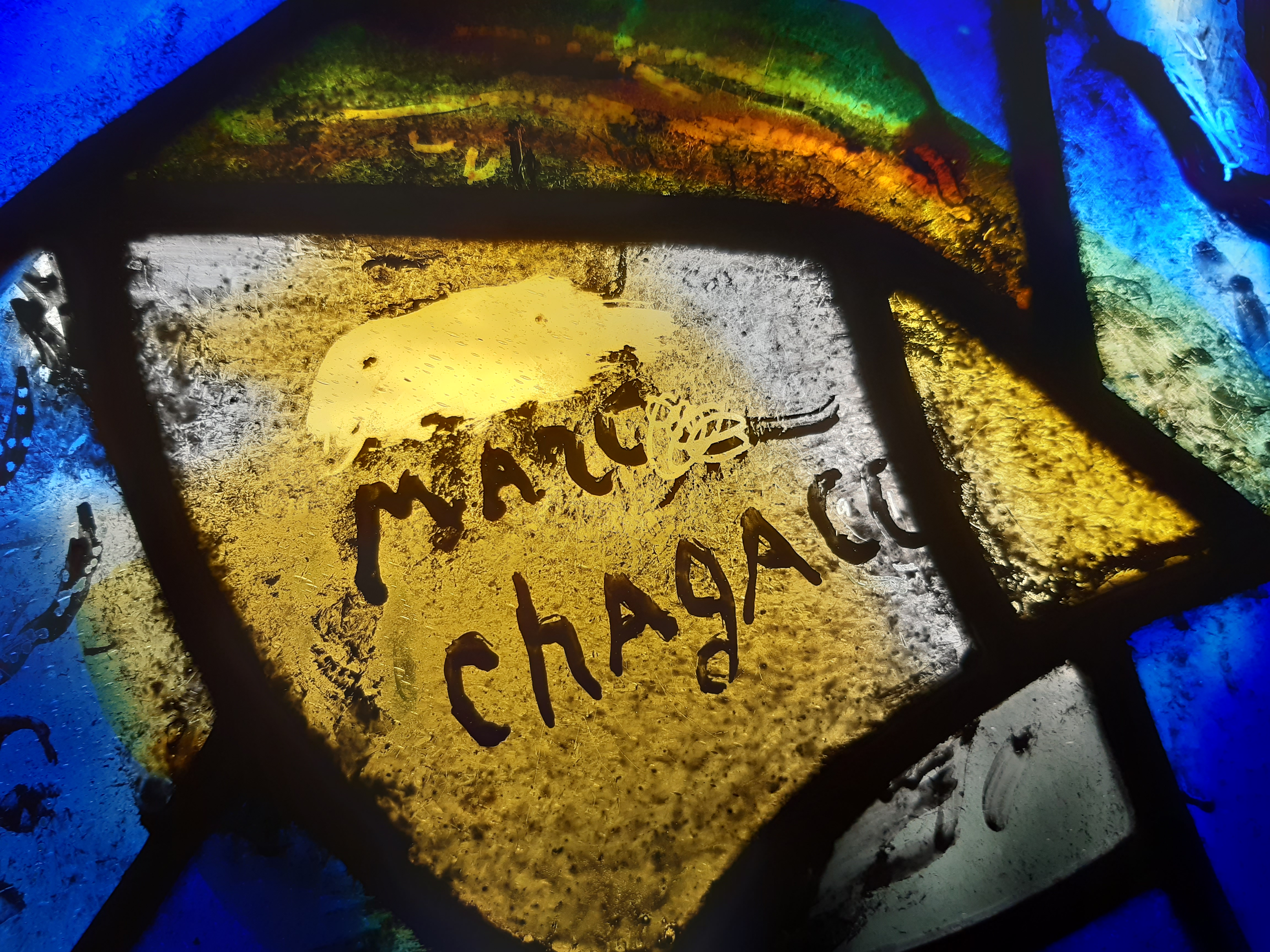
Signature "Marc Chagall" on Window 9

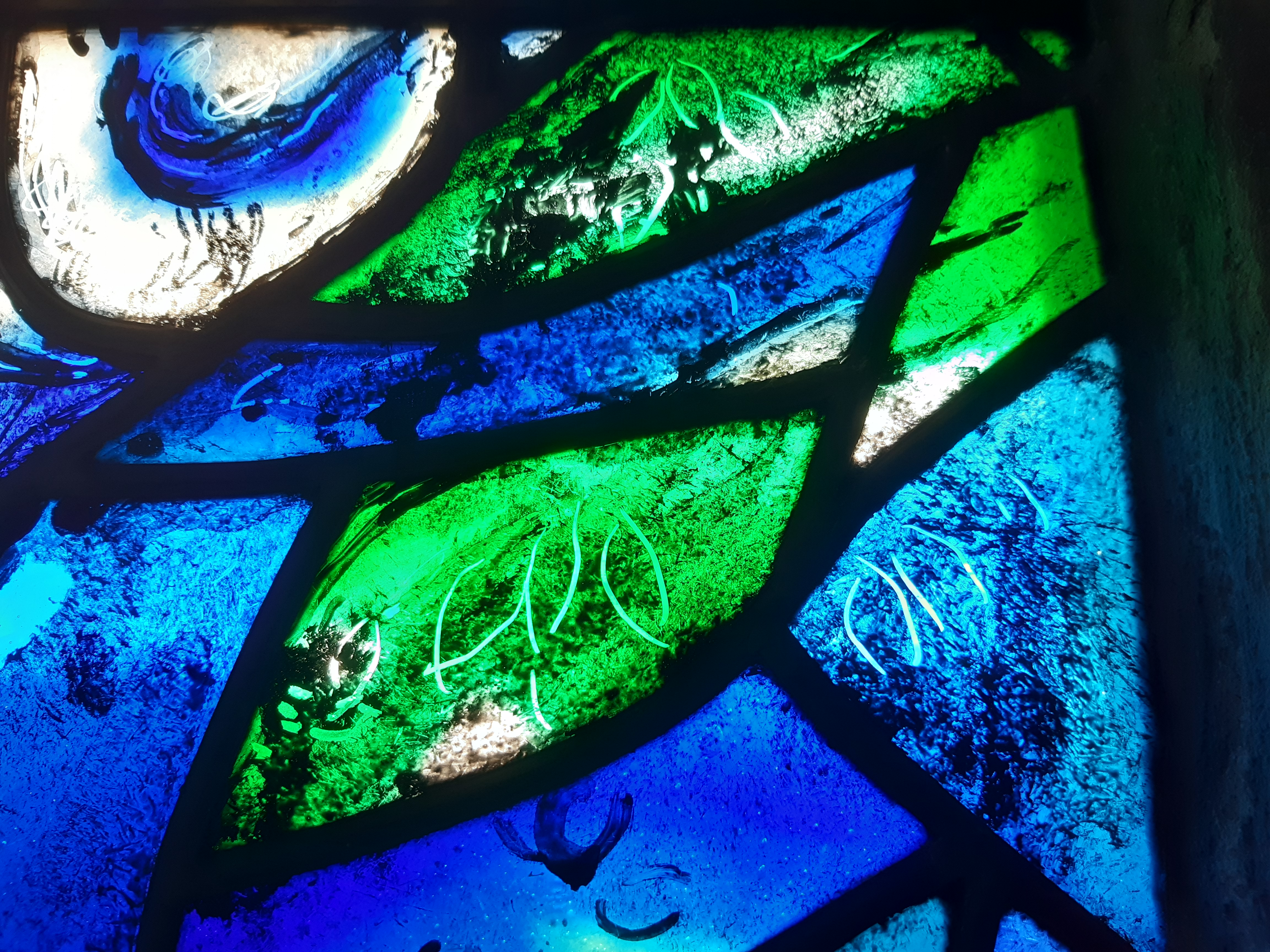
Detail scratched by Chagall in Window 9

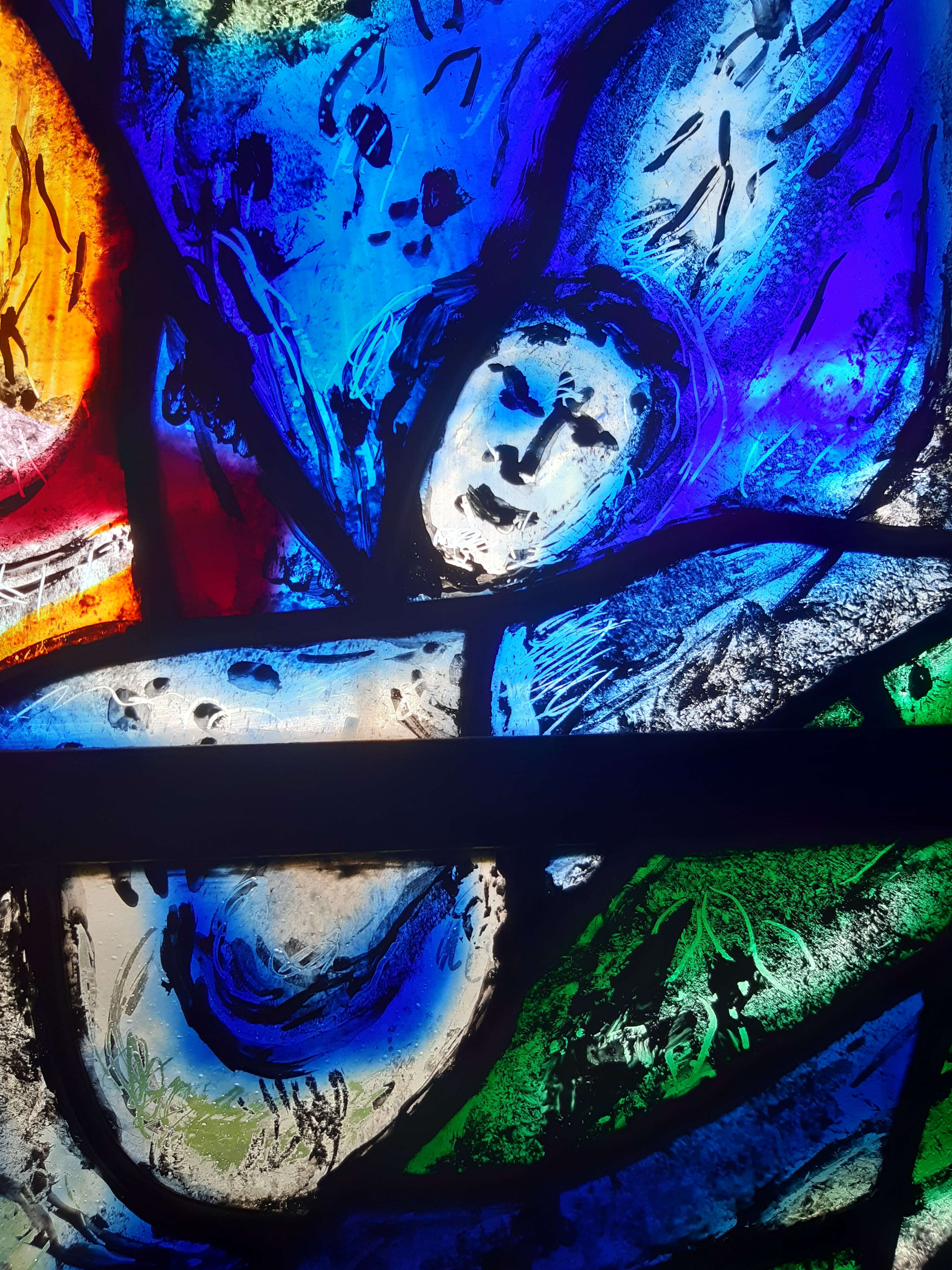
Angel in Window 9

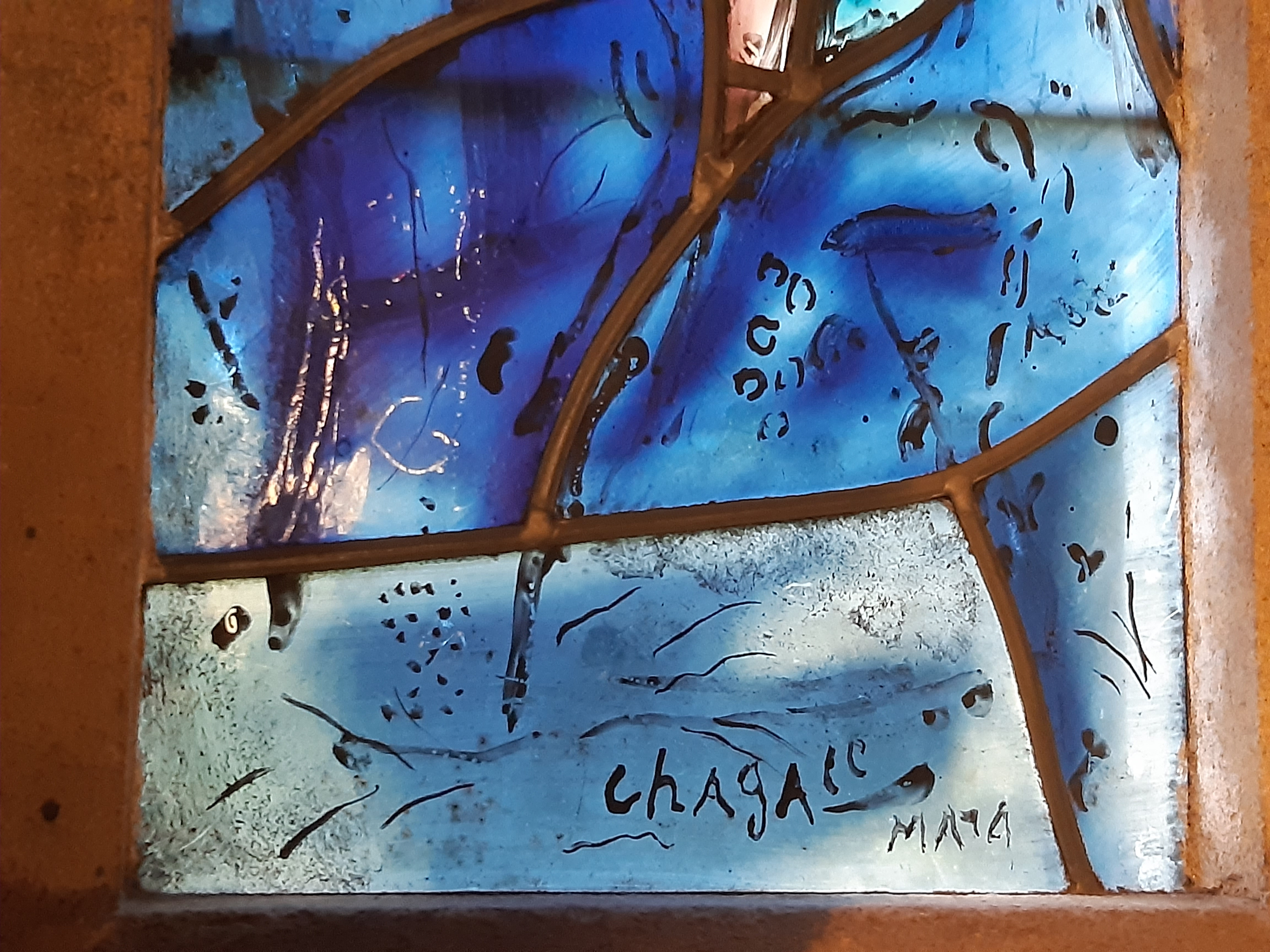
Signatures "Chagall" and [Charles] "Marq" in Window 4

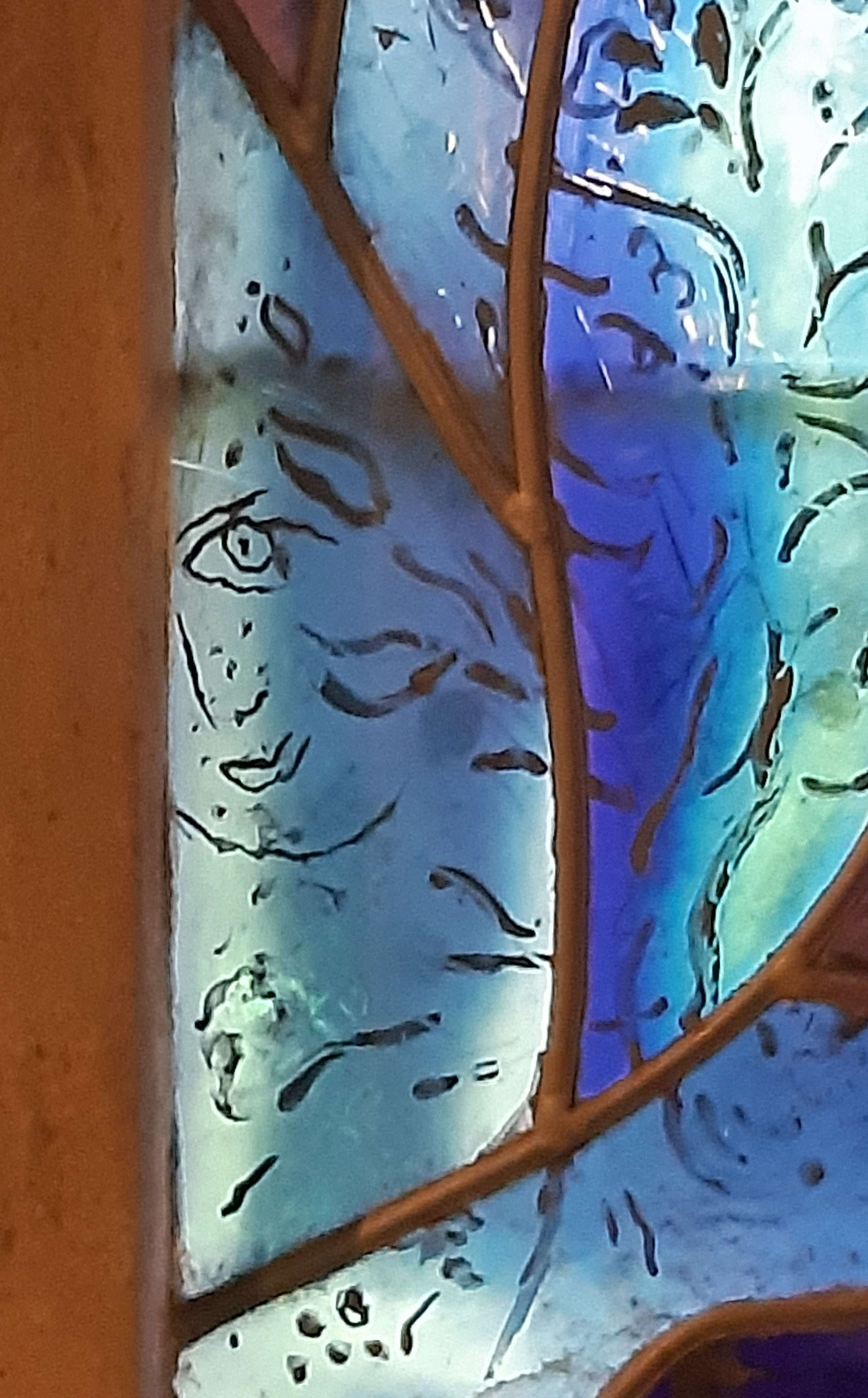
Small face, possibly Chagall's, in Window 4

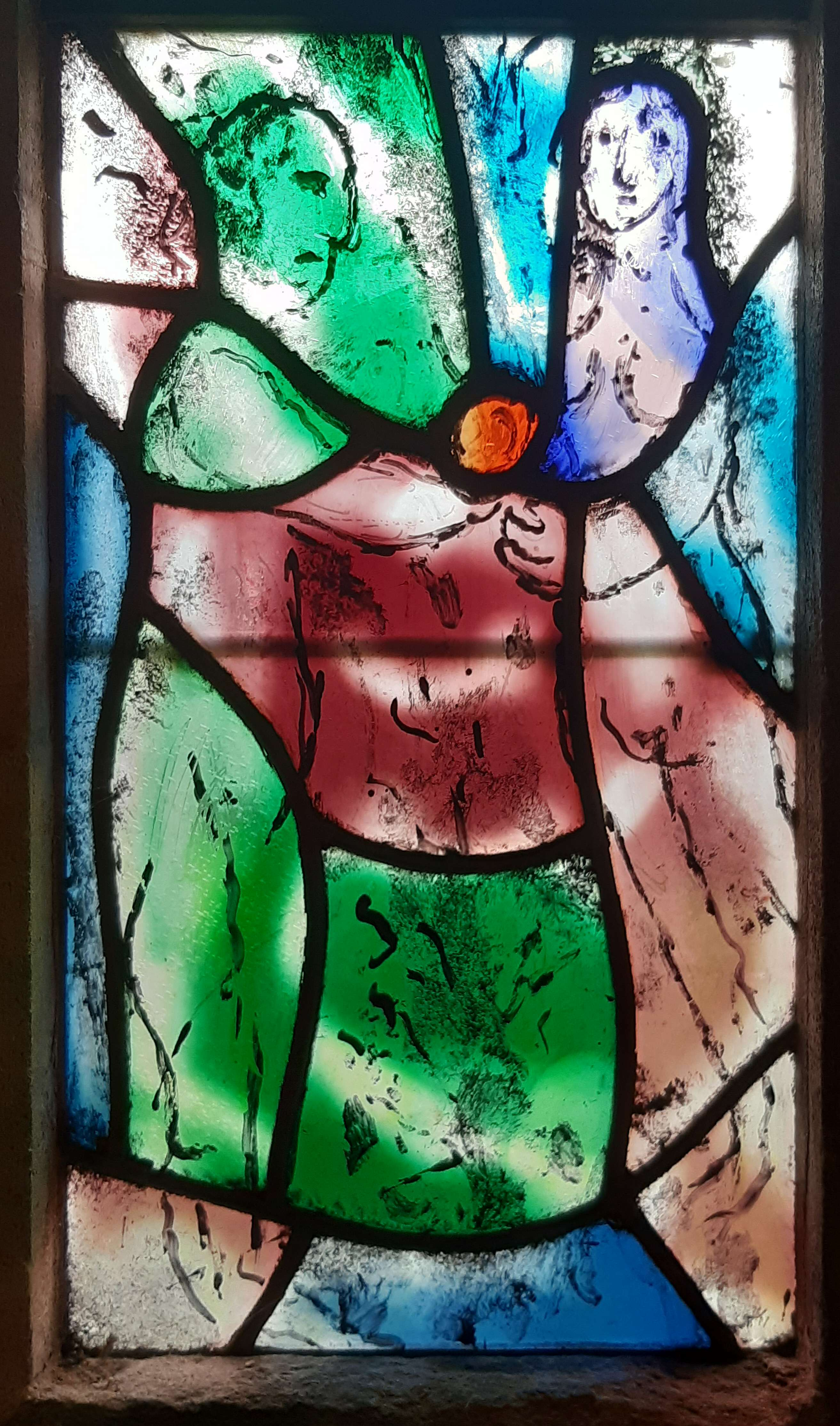
Detail of Adam and Eve in Window 1

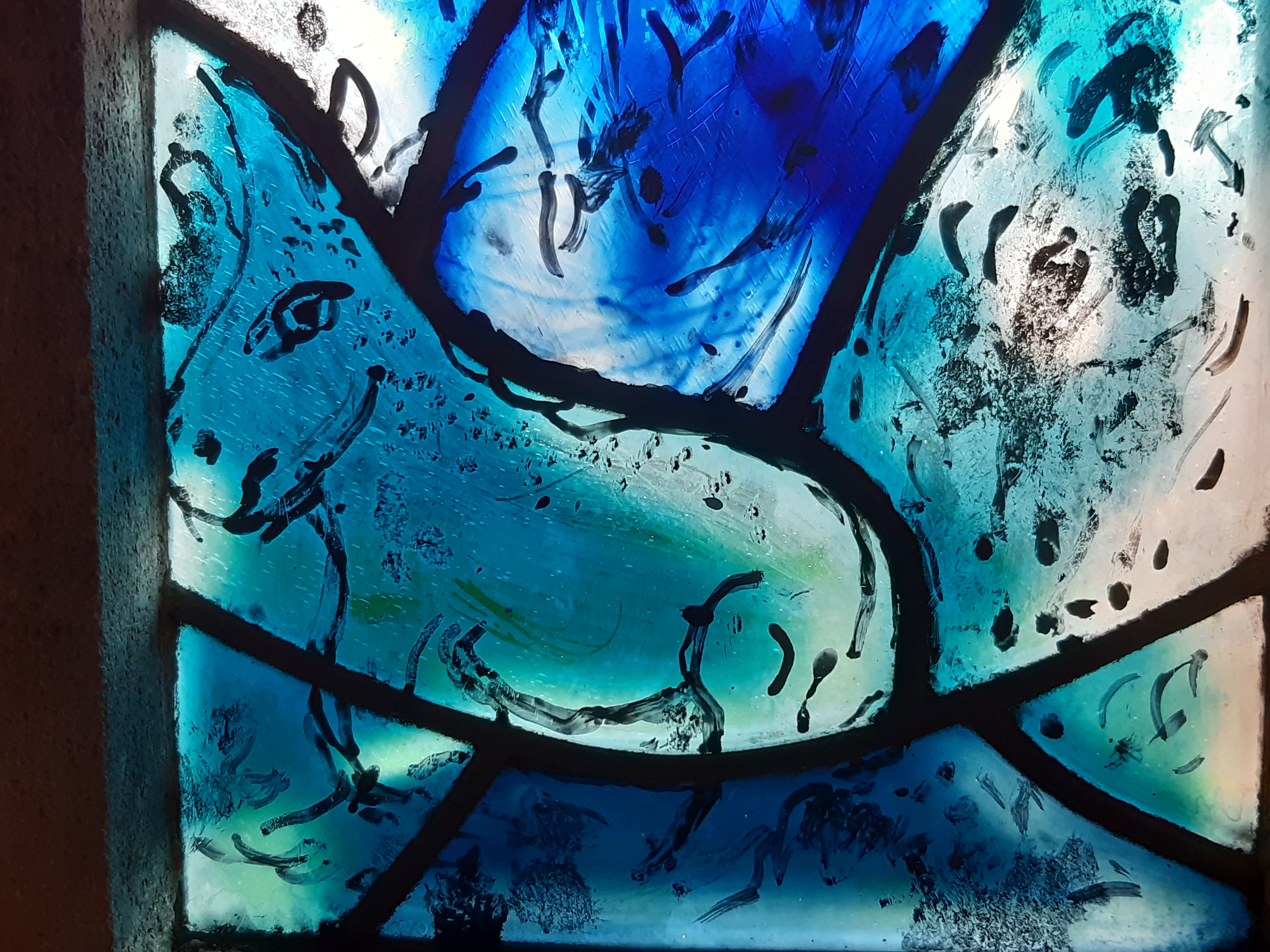
Detail of donkey in Window 1

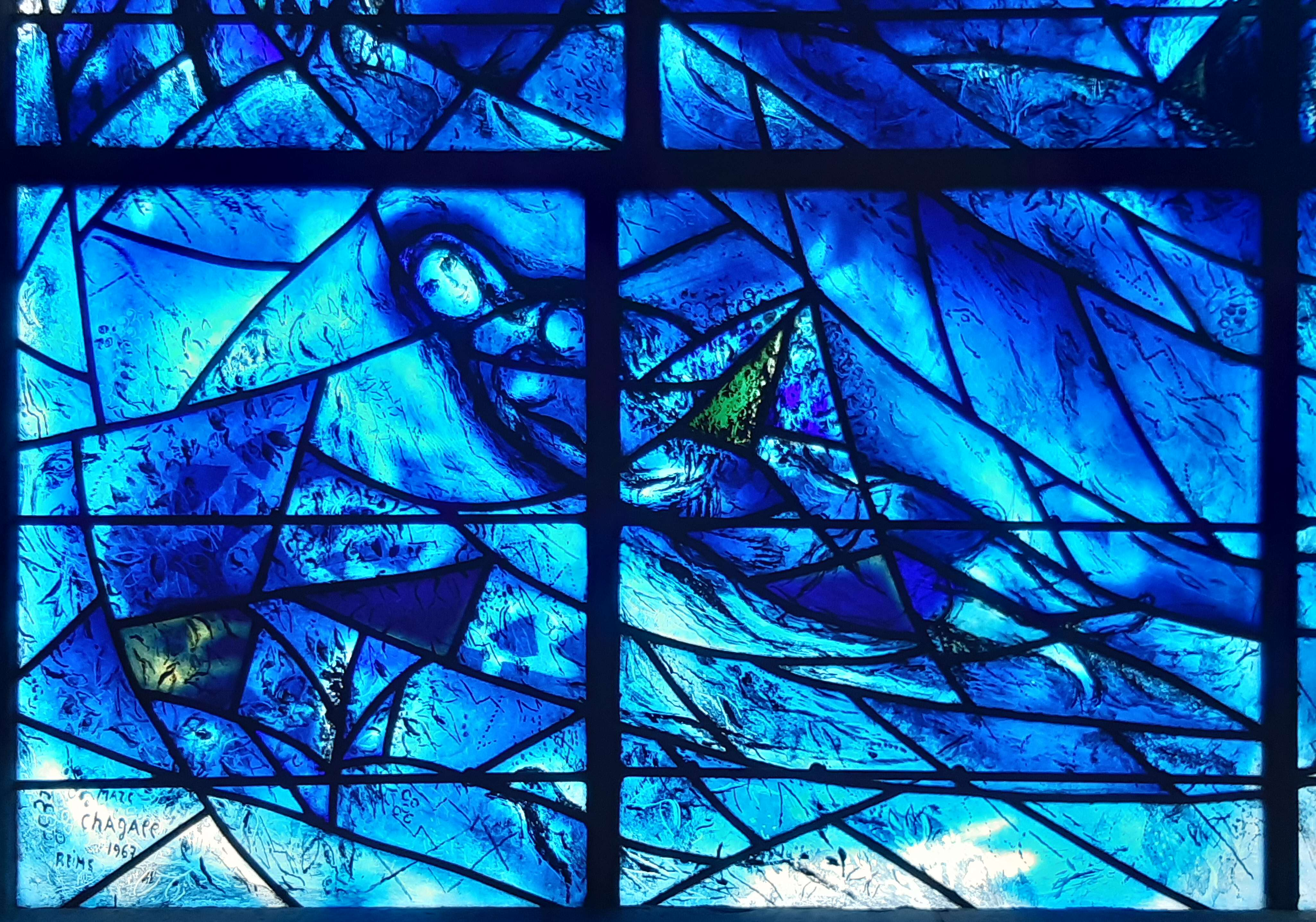
Detail of drowned woman in Window 8

== See also ==
- List of artworks by Marc Chagall
