= John Thorpe =

English architect (fl. 1570–1618)

John Thorpe or Thorp (c.1565–1655?; fl.1570–1618) was an English architect.

== Life ==
Little is known of his life, and his work is dubiously inferred, rather than accurately known, from a folio of drawings in the Sir John Soane's Museum, to which Horace Walpole called attention, in 1780, in his Anecdotes of Painting; but how far these were his own is uncertain.

He was engaged on a number of important English houses of his time, and several, such as Longleat, have been attributed to him on grounds which cannot be sustained, because they were built before he was born. In 1570 when he was five years old, he laid the foundation stone of Kirby Hall, Northamptonshire his father being the Master mason of the project. He was probably the designer of Charlton House, in Charlton, London; the original Longford Castle, Wiltshire; Condover Hall and the original Holland House, Kensington; and he is said to have been engaged on Rushton Hall, Northamptonshire, and Audley End, Essex (with Bernard Janssens).

Thorpe's major contribution to world architecture is the humble and now-ubiquitous corridor, included in a 1597 plan of a "Great House" in Chelsea, London, allowing independent access to rooms. Thorpe marked the corridor in the plan, thought to be for Beaufort House for Sir Robert Cecil, as "A long Entry through all". Previously, grand houses had a so-called enfilade arrangement of rooms in which each room led to the next via connecting internal doors. The enfilade remained popular in continental Europe long after the corridor was widely adopted in England. Thorpe's inspiration may have been the one-sided covered walkway common in monastic cloisters.

Thorpe joined the Office of Works as a clerk, then practised independently as a land surveyor. In August 1605 the Earl of Dorset wrote to "Mr Thorpe" to survey and make "plots" for the rebuilding of Ampthill for Anne of Denmark and Prince Henry. For his work in 1606 surveying Ampthill and Holdenby House (intended as a residence for Charles, Duke of York), Thorpe was paid £70.

From 1611 he was assistant to Robert Tresswell, Surveyor-General of Woods South of the Trent. He retired in the 1630s but seems to have lived to an advanced age, dying around 1655.

== Architectural works ==
- Ampthill Park House, Bedfordshire
- Apethorpe Palace, together with brother Thomas Thorpe
- Aston Hall, Aston
- Audley End, Essex
- Bramshill House, Hampshire (attributed)
- Thornton College, Lincolnshire, for Sir Vincent Skinner c1607-1610
- Hunting Lodge later known as the Old Palace at Bromley-by-Bow, for James I c.1606
- Charlton House, London
- Holland House, Kensington
- Kirby Hall, Northamptonshire
- Longford Castle, Wiltshire
- Rushton Hall, Northamptonshire
- Somerhill House, Kent

== Gallery ==
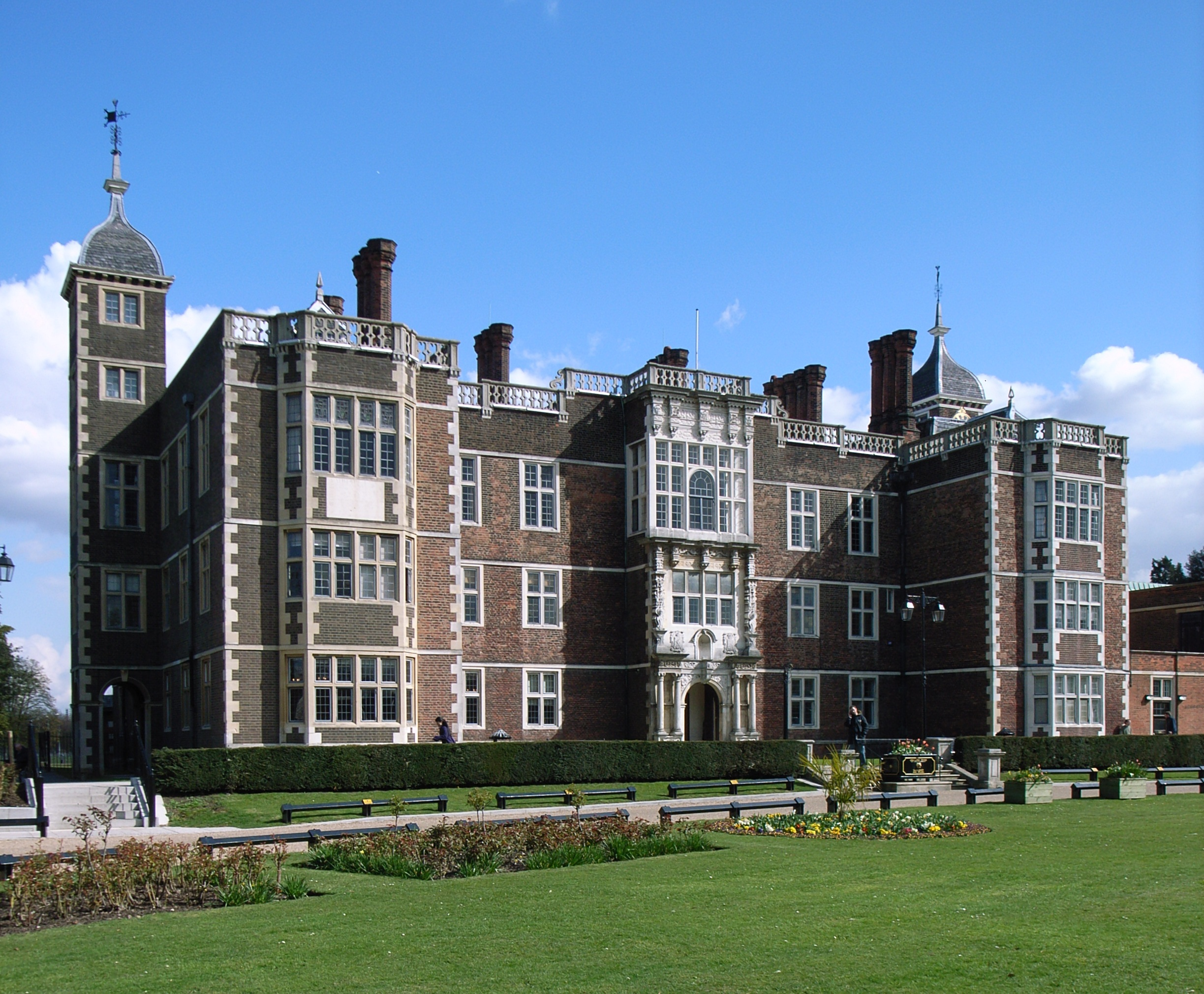
Charlton House, Greenwich

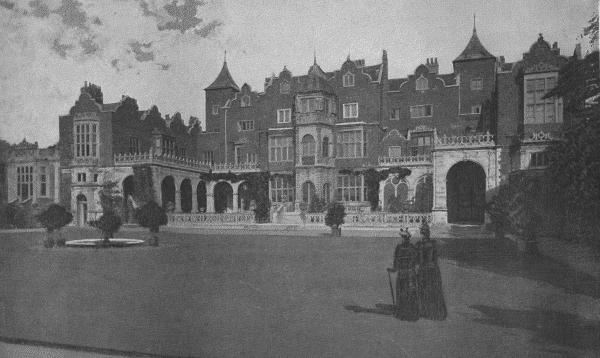
Holland House, Kensington, it was bombed in the London Blitz and only a wing survives

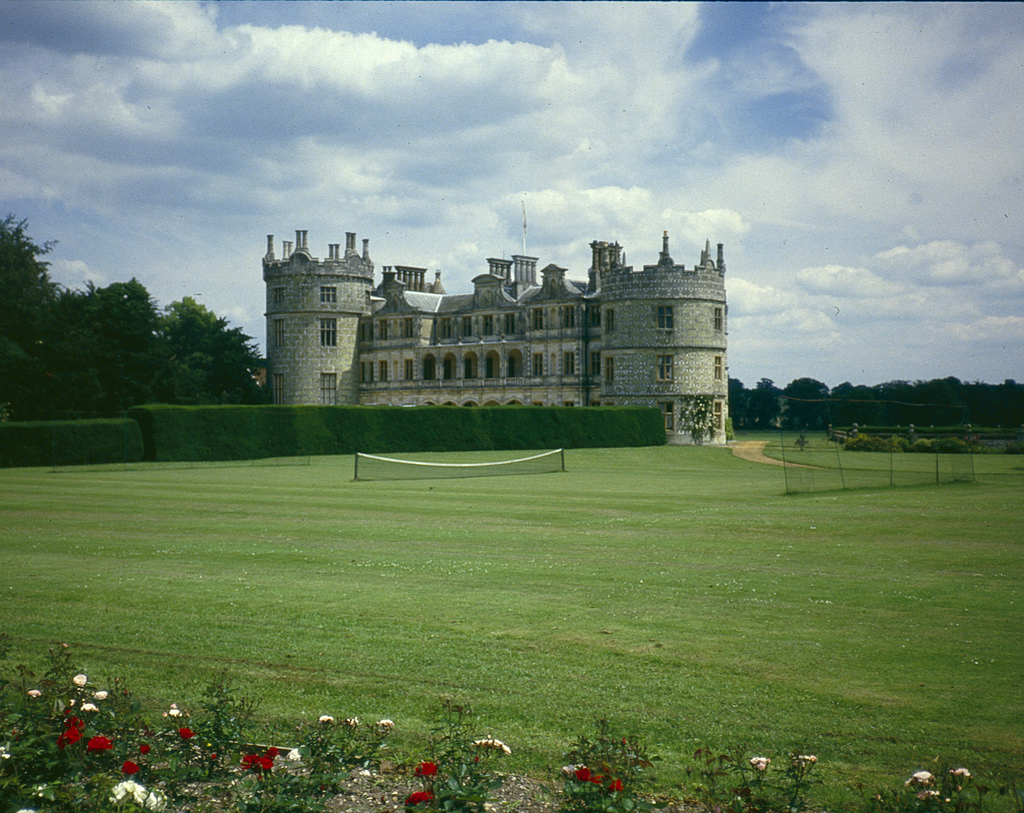
Longford Castle, Wiltshire

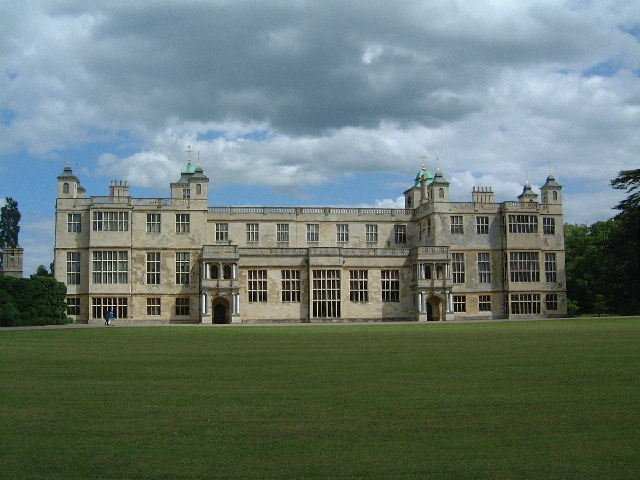
Audley End, Essex, this is the surviving fragment, there used to be a great courtyard in front of this range of buildings

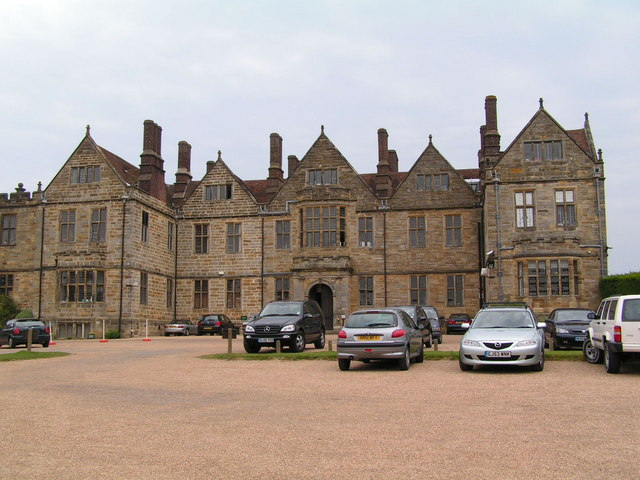
Somerhill House, Kent, designed by Thorpe in 1611
