= Rachel, Countess d'Avigdor =

English Jewish philanthropist and communal worker

- Born: Rachel Goldsmid; 19 September 1816; London, United Kingdom
- Died: 5 November 1896 (aged 80); London, United Kingdom
- Resting place: Kingsbury Road Cemetery
- Spouse: Count Salamon Henri d'Avigdor (m. 1840)
- Father: Sir Isaac Goldsmid
- Relatives: Elim d'Avigdor (son); Estelle Nathan (granddaughter); Osmond d'Avigdor-Goldsmid (grandson)

Rachel, Countess d'Avigdor (19 September 1816 – 5 November 1896) was an English Jewish philanthropist and communal worker.

Rachel was the second daughter of Isabel and Sir Isaac Lyon Goldsmid, and sister of Anna Maria, Frederick, and Francis Goldsmid. She was privately educated by some of the most eminent teachers of the time, including Thomas Campbell, the poet. In June, 1840, she was married to Count Salamon Henri d'Avigdor, son of Grand Sanhedrin member Isaac Samuel d'Avigdor. Shortly after their marriage, the Count and Countess d'Avigdor went to London, where were born their three sons and one daughter. Her husband, from whom she eventually separated, returned to Paris, and became a personal friend of Napoleon III, who conferred upon him the title of Duke of Acquaviva.

The Countess took a deep interest in the communal institutions of the English metropolis. She was at one time president of the Ladies' Committee of the Jews' Deaf and Dumb Home and honorary secretary of the West End Charity, as well as a member of the committees of the Jewish Convalescent Home, of the workhouse committee of the Jewish Board of Guardians, and of the West End Sabbath School. Both the Bayswater Jewish Schools and the Jews' Deaf and Dumb Home owed their inception principally to her advocacy. She was also a signatory of the first mass Votes for Women petition in Britain in 1866.

== Publications ==
- Lewald, Fanny (1848). The Italians at Home. Translated by the Countess d'Avigdor. London: Thomas Cautley Newby.

== See also ==
- Goldsmid family
