= D'Avigdor-Goldsmid baronets =

Extinct baronetcy in the Baronetage of the United Kingdom

The d'Avigdor-Goldsmid Baronetcy, of Somerhill in the County of Kent, was a title in the Baronetage of the United Kingdom. It was created on 22 January 1934 for Osmond d'Avigdor-Goldsmid, president of the Board of Deputies of British Jews and chairman for the Jewish Agency for Palestine in London. He was the grandson of Count Henri Salomon d'Avigdor, Duke of Acquaviva, and Rachel, daughter of Sir Isaac Goldsmid, 1st Baronet, and succeeded to the Goldsmid estates on the death of his cousin Sir Julian Goldsmid, 3rd Baronet (see Goldsmid baronets). His eldest son, the second Baronet, was a company director and Conservative politician. The latter was succeeded by his younger brother, the third Baronet, a retired military commander. He was Conservative Member of Parliament for Lichfield and Tamworth. The title became extinct on his death in 1987.

== D'Avigdor-Goldsmid baronets, of Somerhill (1934) ==
- Sir Osmond Elim d'Avigdor-Goldsmid, 1st Baronet (1877–1940)
- Sir Henry Joseph d'Avigdor-Goldsmid, 2nd Baronet (1909–1976)
- Sir James Arthur d'Avigdor-Goldsmid, 3rd Baronet (1912–1987)

== See also ==
- Goldsmid baronets
- Goldsmid family
