= Sylvie d'Avigdor =

British translator (1873–1954)

- Born: 1873
- Died: 10 June 1954 (aged 80–81)
- Spouse: Charles Blackstone Clapcott (m. 1902)

1917 edition of A Jewish State

Sylvie d'Avigdor Clapcott (Note: Also Sylvia d'Avigdor.) (1873 – 10 June 1954) was a British translator. She is known for her English translation of Theodor Herzl's Der Judenstaat, as well as many of Herzl's speeches.

== Biography ==
Sylvie d'Avigdor was born in London in 1873 to civil engineer Elim d'Avigdor. Her siblings included financier Osmond d'Avigdor-Goldsmid, humanitarian worker Berenice d'Avigdor, and painter Estelle Nathan.

In February 1896, Theodor Herzl published the pamphlet Der Judenstaat. Within two weeks of its publication, d'Avigdor and Herzl agreed that she would produce an English translation; this work (The Jewish State) was published the same year. She also translated many of Herzl's speeches.

In 1902, d'Avigdor married barrister and three-time Mayor of Chelsea Charles Blackstone Clapcott. They had a daughter. Sylvie d'Avigdor died in June 1954.
