= Elim d'Avigdor =

- Born: 9 March 1841; Nice, Kingdom of Sardinia
- Died: 9 February 1895 (aged 53); London, United Kingdom
- Spouse: Henrietta Jacobs (m. 1866)
- Children: Osmond d'Avigdor-Goldsmid; Berenice d'Avigdor; Estelle Nathan; Sylvie d'Avigdor

Elim Henry d'Avigdor (9 March 1841 – 9 February 1895) was a British civil engineer, writer, and Jewish communal leader. He was involved in railway construction projects in various parts of the world and played a significant role in early Zionist organizations in the United Kingdom.

== Early life and education ==
Elim d'Avigdor was born in Nice, then part of the Kingdom of Sardinia, in 1841. He was the eldest son of Count Salamon Henri d'Avigdor and of Rachel, Countess d'Avigdor, the second daughter of Sir Isaac Lyon Goldsmid. He was educated in France until the age of 17.

Originally aspiring to join the Royal Engineers, d'Avigdor was prevented from doing so due to poor eyesight. Instead, he pursued a civilian engineering career, training from 1859 to 1862 under Sir John Hawkshaw. During this time, he also studied at University College, London, and the University of London, earning a Bachelor of Arts degree in 1861.

== Career ==
D'Avigdor began his engineering career as Sub-Manager at the Iron and Shipbuilding works of Martin Samuelson & Co. in Hull. He then spent three years in British Burma working on government projects for the Indian administration. In 1867, he participated in the Western China Survey Expedition and subsequently worked for Waring Brothers on the construction of the East Hungarian Railway.

From there, he moved to Vienna, where he served for five years as Chief Agent for the construction of the city's waterworks. During his time in Austria, he presented a series of papers to the Austrian Institution of Engineers and Architects on "Water Works, Ancient and Modern" and published a study on sanitation in Vienna.

He was elected an Associate of the Institution of Civil Engineers in 1876.

D'Avigdor settled in England in 1877. He was involved in the construction of the Schull and Skibbereen Railway in County Cork, Ireland, and took part in developing the New Zealand Midland Railway, eventually becoming a director of the company. D'Avigdor also helped establish the Tyrian Construction Company to facilitate railway development in Ottoman Syria.

== Literary work ==
D'Avigdor maintained a literary life alongside his engineering work. His writings included a series of stories about hunting, which he published under the pseudonym "Wanderer." He was a contributor to Vanity Fair and publisher of the Examiner and the Yachting Gazette.

== Communal leadership ==
D'Avigdor was affiliated with the West London Synagogue, and later served as a warden at the Bevis Marks Synagogue. From 1871 until his death, he was a member of the council of the Anglo-Jewish Association. He was a founder and leader of the British Ḥovevei Zion movement, and was instrumental in building ties with affiliated groups in continental Europe.

== Personal life and death ==
Elim d'Avigdor married a daughter of Bethel Jacobs of Hull. They had one son and five daughters. His son, Sir Osmond d'Avigdor-Goldsmid, became a leading figure in British public and Jewish life. His daughter Berenice d'Avigdor was a noted humanitarian worker, and his daughter Estelle Nathan a painter.

He died at his residence in Lancaster Gate, London, on 9 February 1895, following a 17-day illness caused by intestinal obstruction.
