= Helen Lucas (philanthropist) =

British philanthropist and social worker (1835–1918)

- Born: Helen Goldsmid; 10 August 1835
- Died: 3 January 1918 (aged 82); Sunninghill, England, United Kingdom of Great Britain and Ireland
- Known for: Philanthropy
- Spouse: Lionel Lucas

Helen Lucas born Helen Goldsmid (10 August 1835 – 3 January 1918) was a British philanthropist and social worker.

== Life ==
Lucas was born in 1835. Her parents were Caroline (born Samuel) and Frederick Goldsmid and she was the first of their nine children. Her Jewish family taught her Hebrew when she was a child. She married Lionel Lucas in 1855 and by 1862 she was a widow with two children and an inheritance.

From 1880 she took up a position within the Jewish Board of Guardians that provided relief to the Jewish poor. She was the President of the ladies conjoint visiting committee. The JBG were very keen on visiting applicants for their aid to ensure that their resources were well spent. In addition she assisted in the adult workroom. By 1896 she was the President of the workrooms where girls would be taught how to embroider and other types of needlework so that they would become employable.

In 1885, she and Louisa de Rothschild jointly paid for the cost of a nurse to work among the poor who were Jewish. Lucas would pay for two more in 1891 and 1892 and they would use a traditional common sense approach to the help and sympathy they offered. Lucas believed that relief workers should give little priority to statistics or paperwork. She argued that relief workers should supply assistance and sympathy first and other questions could be answered later.

The Goldsmid family had been one of the founding families of the West London Synagogue in 1840 that created a new approach to worship. Helen was there when the new synagogue was opened and she was a voice resisting further change. She had to contend with some change but she threatened to leave if services were delivered in English as she was a great supporter of Hebrew.

She was involved with the Jewish Religious Education Board and with the running of the Jews' Free School in London serving on the ladies' committee. She had strong views on the education of girls arguing that cooking was important and that girls who were tidy would be better wives. She thought girls should not wear lace or white schools but should take part in drill and lessons in Hebrew.

Lucas died in Sunninghill in Berkshire in 1918.
