= Estelle Nathan =

British painter

Estelle d'Avigdor Nathan (3 March 1871 – 18 September 1949) was an Austrian-British painter working in the latter years of the 19th century and the early part of the 20th.

Nathan was born in Mediaș, Austro-Hungary (now Romania), the daughter of Italian-born civil engineer Elim Henry D'Avigdor, and his English wife, Henrietta Jacobs of Hull. Her paternal grandparents were Count Henri Salomon d'Avigdor, Duke of Acquaviva and Rachel Goldsmid, daughter of Sir Isaac Goldsmid.

She moved to the UK as a child. She had five sisters and one brother, Osmond d'Avigdor Goldsmid, who was created a baronet in 1934.

She exhibited at the Whitechapel Art Gallery in 1905, and at the Royal Academy in 1907.

She was also responsible for the mural painting at the Goldsmid Hall, Tudeley, in the Arts and Crafts style, showing local estate workers in typical agrarian scene.

She married George Emmanuel Nathan in 1897.
