= Berenice d'Avigdor =

English humanitarian worker (1884 – 1941)

(Beryl) Berenice d’Avigdor (1884 – 1941) was an English humanitarian worker who, after serving as a Deputy Principal in charge of the ambulance service in the Women’s Royal Naval Service in World War I, co-founded two hostels for women with venereal diseases with Dorothy Christian Hare, where she served as secretary. During World War II she 'worked tirelessly on behalf of refugees from Nazism.' As secretary of the West London Synagogue Hospitality Committee, she worked to place escaped Jewish children in education or employment.

== Personal life ==
She was born in 1884 to engineer Elim Henry d’Avigdor. Her brother was financier Sir Osmond d’Avigdor-Goldsmid. Her sister Sylvie d’Avigdor, later Clapcott (1873 – 1954), translated several works by Theodor Herzl including his Der Judenstaat (1896).

She had an interest in botany, contributing to Frederick Hamilton Davey's Flora of Cornwall.
