= Goldsmid baronets =

Extinct baronetcy in the Baronetage of the United Kingdom

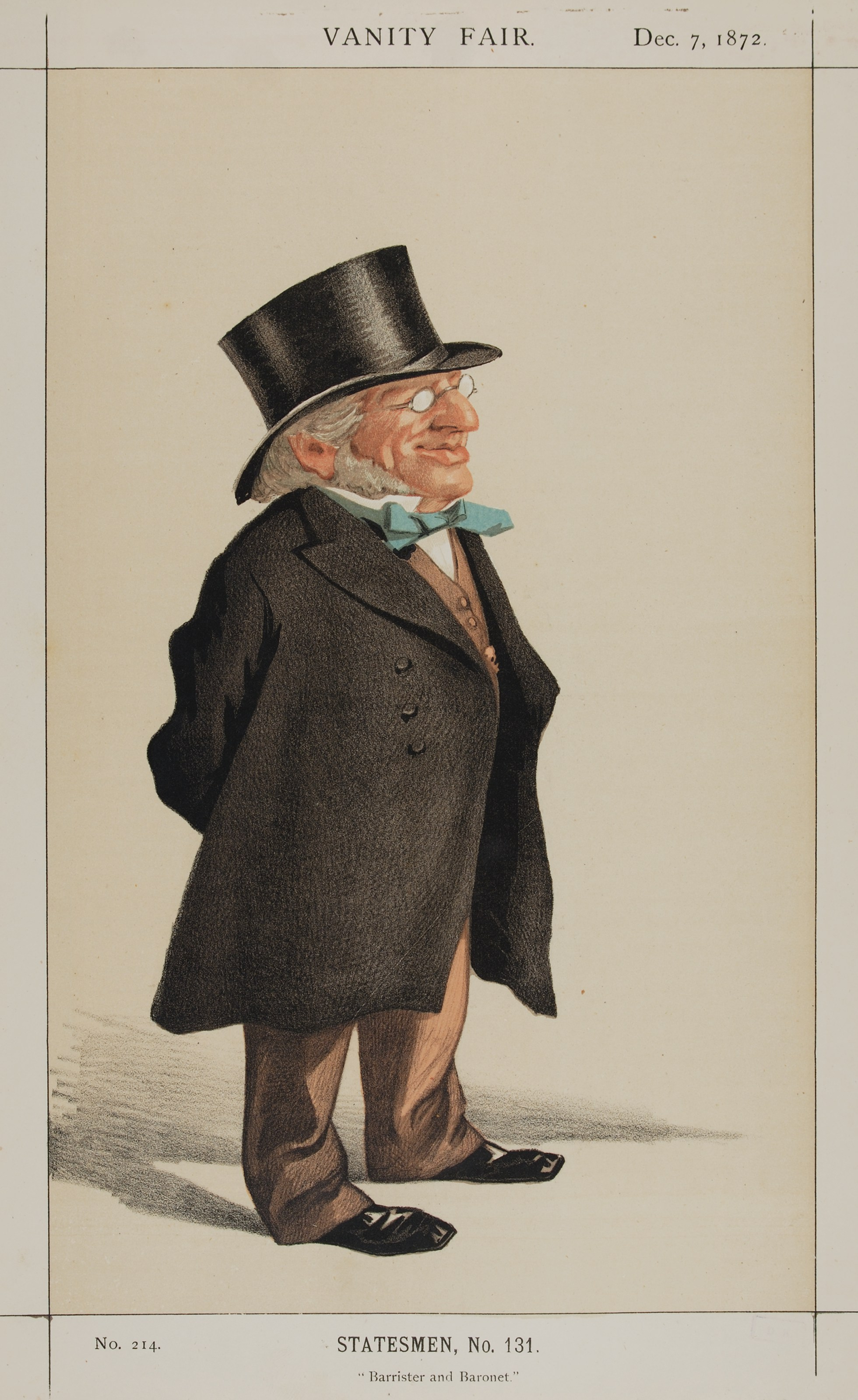
"Barrister and Baronet": Sir Francis Goldsmid as caricatured by James Tissot in Vanity Fair, December 1872

The Goldsmid Baronetcy, of St John's Lodge in the County of Surrey, was a title in the Baronetage of the United Kingdom. It was created on 15 October 1841 for Isaac Goldsmid, a financier and one of the leading figures in the Jewish emancipation in the United Kingdom. He was the first Jew to be created a baronet. He was succeeded by his son Francis Henry, 2nd Baronet the second Baronet. He was a barrister and sat as member of parliament for Reading. He was childless and was succeeded by his nephew Julian, the third Baronet. He was a barrister, businessman and Liberal politician. Julian Goldsmid had eight daughters but no sons and on his death in 1896 the title became extinct.

== Goldsmid baronets, of St John's Lodge (1841) ==
- Sir Isaac Lyon Goldsmid, 1st Baronet (1778–1859)
- Sir Francis Henry Goldsmid, 2nd Baronet (1808–1878)
- Sir Julian Goldsmid, 3rd Baronet (1838–1896)

== See also ==
- Goldsmid family
- D'Avigdor-Goldsmid baronets
- Goldsmid-Stern-Salomons baronets
