= Lionel Louis Cohen =

English financier, politician and communal worker

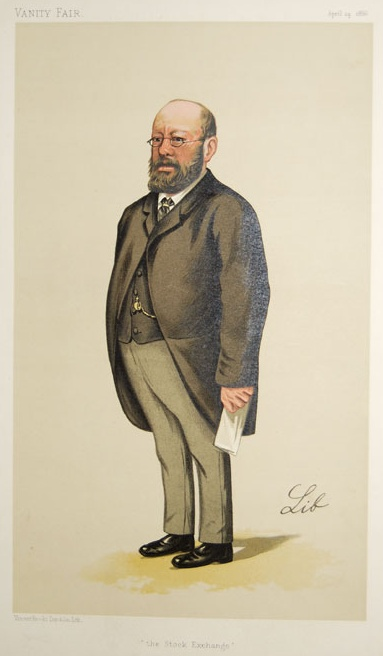
- Cohen depicted by Lib in Vanity Fair (1886)

Member of Parliament for Paddington North
- In office 1885–1887

Personal details
- Born: 1832 London, England
- Died: 26 June 1887 (aged 54–55)
- Party: Conservative
- Spouse: Esther Moses (m. 1856)

Lionel Louis Cohen (1832 – 26 June 1887) was an English financier, politician, and communal worker. He married Esther Moses, daughter of Jacob Henry Moses, in 1856. He served as a trustee and later manager of the London Stock Exchange, and became the head of his father's firm Louis Cohen & Sons. He retired in 1885 on being elected Conservative member of Parliament.

== Life ==
Cohen was born in London to Louis Cohen, the founder of the house of Louis Cohen & Sons, foreign bankers and members of the London Stock Exchange.

During his time in the Stock Exchange, Cohen's financial ability was shown by his services in connection with the Turkish debt, which earned for him a nomination to the Order of the Medjidie. A prominent worker in the Conservative cause at a time when the great bulk of Jews were unquestioning adherents of the Liberal party, he caused considerable sensation in 1874 by appealing to Jews to exercise their independent judgment in political affairs.

At the 1885 general election he was returned to the House of Commons for the Paddington North constituency. He was re-elected in the 1886, and held the seat until his death. During his short tenure of his position he served with distinction on the royal commissions on the depression in trade, on gold and silver, and on endowed schools.

== Charitable work ==
Cohen from his early years devoted much time to the service of the community. On entering public life he found the three city synagogues and various societies administering charitable relief in a chaotic and unscientific manner, and took a notable part in the efforts made to remedy it. In 1859, when the synagogue vestries agreed, on the motion of Ephraim Alex, overseer of the poor, to delegate their powers to a specially constituted board of guardians, Cohen became its honorary secretary.

His "Scheme for the Better Management of All the Jewish Poor", elaborated in 1860, practically formed the constitution of the Jewish Board of Guardians for the relief of the Jewish poor, the chief charitable institution of the Anglo-Jewish community. In 1878 he was elected president of the board, and filled that office till his death. He gave in all 28 years of unremitting service to the institution, which under his inspiration earned recognition as a great and model charity within and beyond the community.

Cohen also took the leading share in the movement which, after many years of labor, culminated in the federation by Act of Parliament in 1870 of the Great, the Hambro', and the New synagogues under the title of the "United Synagogue". He presided over the first meeting of its council, of which he was elected a vice-president, and was the ruling spirit and mastermind of the organisation, which during his lifetime grew into a corporation of eleven metropolitan congregations and the most influential body of its kind in the British empire.

In 1881 he initiated the movement in favour of the persecuted Russian Jews, and raised the first fund in England for their relief.

== Writings ==
Cohen wrote a pamphlet on Indian railways, was a frequent contributor to the Jewish journals, and wrote the masterly series of reports of the board of guardians during his tenure of office as honorary secretary of that institution. The series of statistical tables started by him in these reports has ever since formed a model for similar compilations.

Parliament of the United Kingdom
New constituency	Member of Parliament for Paddington North; 1885 – 1887	Succeeded by Sir John Aird
