= Jewish Board of Guardians =

Jewish Board of Guardians may refer to:

- Jewish Board of Guardians (New York), a precursor to the Jewish Board of Family and Children's Services
- Jewish Board of Guardians (United Kingdom), founded in London in 1859
