= Frederica Maclean Rowan =

Author and translator (1814–1882)

- Born: 22 April 1814; West Indies
- Died: 23 October 1882 (aged 68); London, England

Frederica Maclean Rowan (22 April 1814 – 23 October 1882) was a British author and translator.

== Life ==
Rowan was born in the West Indies in 1814.

She worked for some years for the barrister and philanthropist Sir Francis Goldsmid. His wife was Louisa Goldsmid who campaigned for women's rights and education. Rowan had more moderate opinions, believing that women should have equality under the law but without the need for political action.

Her most notable translation is that of work by Johann Heinrich Daniel Zschokke, which was appreciated by Prince Albert. After Albert's death, Queen Victoria asked Rowan to translate further and assisted her by editing the resulting text.

Rowan died in Maida Hill in London in 1882.

== Works translated ==
- The Life of Schleiermacher, As Unfolded In His Autobiography and Letters, Vols I & II. London, Smith, Elder and Co., 1860.
