= Flavia Blois =

English painter (1914-1980)

The Right Honourable The Lady Burntwood
- Born: Flavia Ria Joan Blois; 28 December 1914; Yoxford, Suffolk, England
- Died: 28 March 1980 (aged 65); Westminster, London, England
- Education: Chelsea School of Art; Euston Road School
- Known for: Painting
- Spouse: Julian Snow, Baron Burntwood (m. 1948)

Flavia Ria Joan Blois, later Baroness Burntwood, (28 December 1914 – 28 March 1980) was a British landscape artist.

== Biography ==
Blois was born at Cockfield Hall at Yoxford in Suffolk into the Blois family. Her father was Sir Ralph Barrett MacNaghten Blois, a baronet, and her mother was Winifred Grace Blois née Kennard. Flavia Blois studied art in London, first at the Chelsea School of Art and then at the Euston Road School. She studied in Paris during 1939 and 1940 after which she turned away from portrait painting to depicting landscapes and street scenes. Blois painted many landscapes in the East Anglia countryside, usually working in oils in her studio from ink notes made outdoors. She exhibited at the Royal Academy on a regular basis and with both the London Group and the New English Art Club. During her career she had three solo gallery shows.

In 1948 Blois married Julian Snow who, in 1970, became a Life peer as Baron Burntwood, having previously been the Labour Party MP for Lichfield and Tamworth. Blois died in 1980 at Westminster in central London.
