= Agnes Zimmermann =

German concert pianist and composer

Agnes Zimmerman
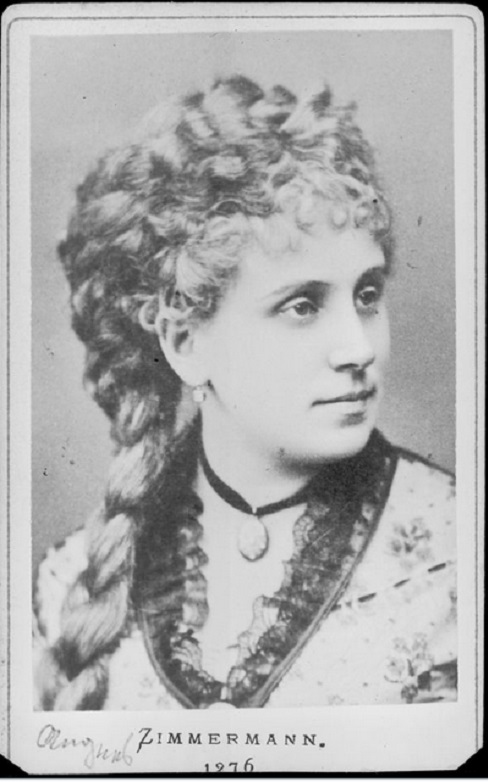
- Born: Agnes Marie Jacobina Zimmermann; 5 July 1847; Cologne, Germany
- Died: 14 November 1925 (aged 78); London, England
- Education: Royal Academy of Music
- Occupations: Concert pianist, composer

Agnes Marie Jacobina Zimmermann (5 July 1847 – 14 November 1925) was a German concert pianist and composer who lived and worked in England, where she enjoyed a fifty-year performance career, one of the longest unbroken spans before the public. From the 1870s through to the 1890s in particular she was a central figure in British musical life.

== Biography ==
Agnes Marie Jacobina Zimmermann was born in Cologne, Germany. Her family moved to England, and she was enrolled at the Royal Academy of Music at the age of nine, where her teachers were Charles Steggall and Cipriani Potter. Later she studied under Ernst Pauer and Sir George Macfarren. Zimmermann received the Kings Scholarship from 1860 to 1862 and made her public debut in 1863, aged 16, at The Crystal Palace, playing two movements from Beethoven's Emperor Concerto. In 1868 she gave the first of a series of two-piano recitals with Clara Schumann: they often performed Robert Schumann’s Andante und Variationen, Op. 46 together.

After ending her studies, Zimmermann went on a tour of Germany, followed by concert tours in 1879, 1880, 1882 and 1883. She remained an active performer for decades, establishing a long-running series of recitals and chamber concerts at the Hanover Square Rooms from 1865, playing her own compositions at the Monday and Saturday Popular Concert series at the St James's Hall in London from the mid-1870s into the 1890s, performing piano concertos (Bach, Mozart, Rubinstein, Schumann), and chamber music with the all-female Shinner Quartet or with violinists Émile Sauret and Ludwig Straus and cellists Franz Xaver Neruda and Alfredo Piatti. With Joachim and Piatti in March 1891 she gave the first British performance of Brahms' B Major piano trio, Op. 8 in its revised version. She appeared at the Hallé concerts in Manchester, the Hereford and Norwich Festivals, in Edinburgh and Glasgow, and in many English provincial towns.

Zimmermann moved in (at 13, Portman Square) with feminist Lady Louisa Goldsmid after the latter's husband, barrister Sir Francis Goldsmid died in 1878. Zimmermann was said to have given eighteen years of "devoted attention" to Goldsmid, who died in 1908, and it has been speculated that this was a lesbian relationship.

Struggling with failing eyesight and other health issues, Zimmermann gave her final public performance in 1913, but continued to play privately from memory for friends. Several notable composers dedicated works to her, including George Alexander Macfarren's Three Sonatas (1880) and Michele Esposito's Ballades, Op. 59 (1907).

In the last decades of her life Zimmermann was an active supporter of the Catholic Church. In 1906, while living at Red Lodge, 6 Devonshire Place in Eastbourne she donated £1,500 to help build a new church, St. Agnes in Whitely Road. She died in London in 1925, leaving her £40,000 fortune to the Catholic Church and various charities. Her valuable collection of Edward Lear prints was bequeathed to the National Portrait Gallery and her library of sheet music and original compositions went to the Royal Academy of Music.

Her obituary in The Times commented that "Hers was a classic style of performance, her style belonging to her repertory...she had no wish to go beyond it by experimenting either in modern music or modern methods".

== Works ==
Zimmermann composed mostly solo piano works, chamber music (such as the five movement Suite for piano trio) and songs. Her best works are considered to be the three Violin Sonatas, opp. 16, 21 and 23, which she performed in London regularly with violinists including Joseph Joachim and Wilma Neruda (Lady Hallé). These have been recorded by Mathilde Milwidsky and Sam Haywood. She also produced editions of the complete piano works of Robert Schumann, of the Beethoven sonatas (1873, republished 1880) and of the Mozart sonatas.

Selected works (many published by Novello, Ewer & Co) include:

- Drei Clavierstücke for piano (c. 1865?)
- Barcarolle for piano, Op.8. (1868)
- Bolero for piano, Op. 9 (1868)
- Spring Melody for piano, Op. 10 (1869)
- Marche for piano, Op. 13 (1869)
- Gavotte for piano, Op. 14 (1870)
- Presto alla Tarantella for piano, Op. 15
- Violin Sonata No. 1 in D minor, Op. 16 (1868, dedicated to Joachim)
- Cello Sonata, Op. 17 (published 1872 by Schott)
- Suite for piano, violin and cello, Op. 19 (1873)
- Violin Sonata No. 2 in A minor, Op. 21 (1875)
- Suite for piano, Op. 22 (1878)
- Violin Sonata No. 3 in G minor, Op. 23 (1879, dedicated to Lady Goldsmid)
- Variations on Mendelssohn's ‘Hirtenlied’ for flute and piano (1880)
- Benediction Service, choral (1901)
- (also String Quartet in E♭, Quintet in E♭, Piano Quartet in C, solo songs, duets, partsongs)
