= Bruce George =

British politician (1942–2020)

The Right Honourable Bruce George
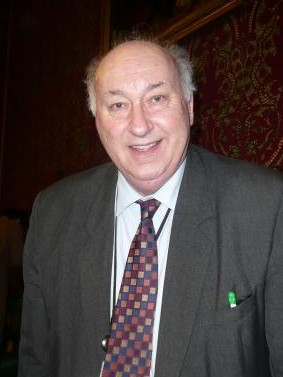
- George in 2008

Chairman of the Defence Select Committee
- In office 16 July 1997 – 12 July 2005
- Preceded by: Michael Colvin
- Succeeded by: James Arbuthnot

Member of Parliament for Walsall South
- In office 28 February 1974 – 12 April 2010
- Preceded by: Henry d'Avigdor-Goldsmid
- Succeeded by: Valerie Vaz

Personal details
- Born: Bruce Thomas George; 1 June 1942 Mountain Ash, Glamorgan, Wales
- Died: 24 February 2020 (aged 77) London, England
- Party: Labour
- Spouse: Lisa Toelle
- Education: University of Wales, Swansea
- Website: http://www.bruce-george.com/

Bruce Thomas George PC (1 June 1942 – 24 February 2020) was a British Labour Party politician, who served as the Member of Parliament (MP) for Walsall South from February 1974 until 2010.

== Early life ==
George was born in Mountain Ash, Mid-Glamorgan, to Phyllis George and her husband Edgar George, a policeman. He was educated at the Mountain Ash Grammar School and the University of Wales, Swansea, where he was awarded a Bachelor of Arts degree in political theory and government. He finished his education at the University of Warwick where he earned a master's degree in comparative politics. He was an assistant lecturer in social studies at the Glamorgan Polytechnic from 1964 to 1966. He lectured in politics at the Manchester Polytechnic from 1968 until he became a senior politics lecturer at the Birmingham Polytechnic in 1970. He left this post when he was elected to Parliament in 1974. He was also a tutor with the Open University from 1970 until 1973.

== Parliamentary career ==
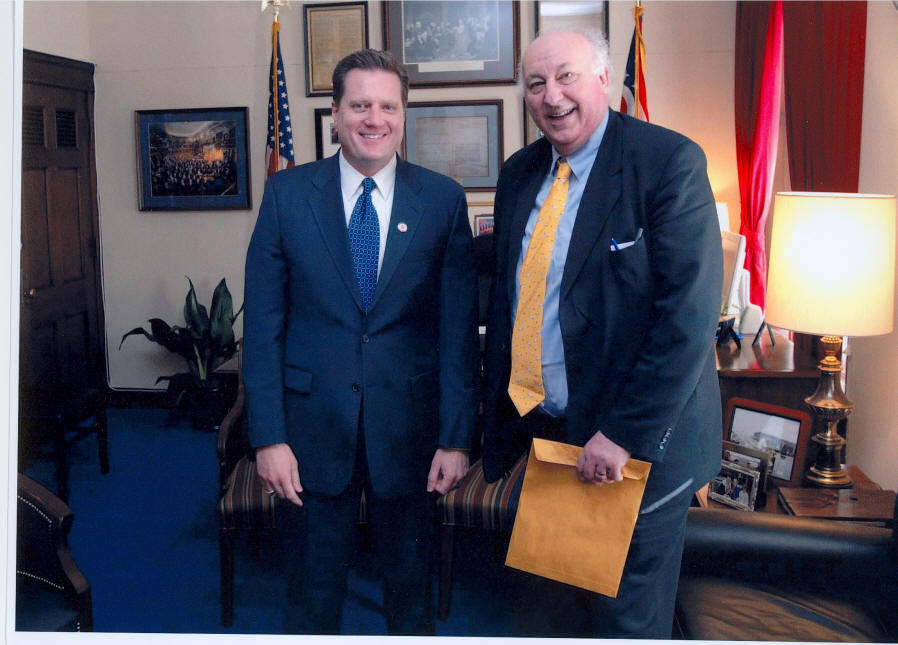
George with Mike Turner in 2004

George contested Southport at the 1970 general election but was defeated by the sitting Conservative MP, Ian Percival, coming third in the poll. He was elected to the House of Commons for Walsall South at the February 1974 general election.

George served as a member of the House of Commons Defence Select Committee from 1979 until 2005, serving as chairman of the committee from 1998 to 2005. He became a member of the Privy Council in 2000.

Although he was an MP for 36 years, George was never on the frontbench. He is seen as a supporter of NATO and a strong military. He was Leader of the UK Delegation to the NATO Parliamentary Assembly and was elected vice-president of the Assembly in November 2007. In 2002, he was elected president of the Parliamentary Assembly of the Organization for Security and Co-operation in Europe, and was re-elected in 2003. Between 2004 and June 2006, he served as President Emeritus and Special Advisor on Mediterranean Affairs. He also regularly acted as an election monitor, especially in disputed Presidential elections in Ukraine and Georgia.

On 18 February 2010, George announced that he would stand down at the 2010 general election. He was succeeded in his constituency by Valerie Vaz.

== After the House of Commons ==
In May 2011, George was awarded the Medal of Honour by the president of Georgia for his considerable contribution to the democratisation of that country. In October 2011, he was made an Honorary Freeman of the Borough by Walsall Council in recognition of his 36 years' service as Member of Parliament for Walsall South. In 2012, he was awarded the OSCE Medal in recognition of his contribution to the work of the OSCE before, during and after his presidency of the OSCE Parliamentary Assembly.

== Personal life and death ==
George married Lisa Toelle in 1992.

George was an honorary political advisor to The Royal British Legion and vice-president of the UK's largest professional security organisation, The Security Institute.

In 1981, he was a visiting lecturer at the University of Essex and later a visiting professor at the University of Portsmouth, Institute of Criminal Justice Studies.

George was a supporter of Walsall F.C.

On 24 February 2020, George died due to complications of Alzheimer's disease in London, at the age of 77.

== Publications ==
- The State of the Alliance Co-Authored by Bruce George, 1987, Avalon Publishing, ISBN 0-8133-7404-9
- Jane's NATO Handbook Edited by Bruce George, 1990, Jane's Information Group ISBN 0-7106-0598-6
- Jane's NATO Handbook Edited by Bruce George, 1991, Jane's Information Group ISBN 0-7106-0976-0
- The British Labour Party and Defence by Bruce George, 1992, Greenwood Press ISBN 0-275-94202-3
- Worth Saving: The Story of the Staffordshire Regiment's Fight for Survival by Bruce George and Nick Ryan, 1996, Dalesman Publishing Company Ltd ISBN 1-85825-070-6
