= Jack d'Avigdor-Goldsmid =

British Army general and politician (1912–1987)

Major-General Sir Jack d'Avigdor-Goldsmid Bt CB OBE MC

Member of Parliament for Lichfield and Tamworth
- In office 18 June 1970 – 20 September 1974
- Preceded by: Julian Snow
- Succeeded by: Bruce Grocott

Personal details
- Born: 19 December 1912 Tonbridge, Kent
- Died: 6 September 1987 (aged 74)
- Party: Conservative
- Relatives: See Goldsmid family
- Education: Royal Military College, Sandhurst
- Awards: Companion of the Order of the Bath; Officer of the Order of the British Empire; Military Cross

Military service
- Allegiance: United Kingdom
- Branch/service: British Army
- Years of service: 1932–1968
- Rank: Major-General
- Commands: 20th Armoured Brigade
- Battles/wars: Second World War

Major-General Sir James Arthur "Jack" d'Avigdor-Goldsmid, 3rd Baronet, CB, OBE, MC (19 December 1912 – 6 September 1987) was a British Army officer and British Conservative politician. He was a member of the prominent Anglo-Jewish d'Avigdor-Goldsmid family, and his brother Sir Henry d'Avigdor-Goldsmid, 2nd Baronet was also a Member of Parliament.

== Early life ==
D'Avigdor-Goldsmid was born in 1912 at Somerhill House, Kent, the younger son of Sir Osmond d'Avigdor-Goldsmid, 1st Baronet. He was educated at Sandroyd School and Harrow School.

== Military career ==
Having attended the Royal Military College, Sandhurst, d'Avigdor-Goldsmid was commissioned into the 4th/7th Royal Dragoon Guards on 1 September 1932 as a second lieutenant. He was promoted to lieutenant on 1 September 1935. He was appointed adjutant on 14 October 1937. He was promoted to captain on 1 September 1940. As a captain (temporary major) he participated in the D-Day landings of the Second World War.

He was promoted to major on 1 July 1946, lieutenant colonel on 31 December 1951, and to colonel on 19 January 1956. He was given command of 20th Armoured Brigade in 1958. He was promoted to brigadier on 1 January 1961. He was appointed Deputy Commander of Aldershot Command from September 1961 to 1962. On 31 October 1962, he was granted the temporary rank of major-general and appointed Director of the Royal Armoured Corps. His promotion to major-general was confirmed on 1 January 1963 and back dated to 31 October 1962 with seniority from 6 April 1962. He relinquished the appointment of Director of the Royal Armoured Corps on 27 January 1965.

On 28 February 1965, he was appointed President of the Regular Commissions Board, relinquishing the position on 20 September 1965. On 1 February 1966, he was posted to the Ministry of Defence as Director of Territorial Army and Cadets. He relinquished the post on 20 January 1968, the day he retired from the military.

== Later life and political career ==
In 1968, D'Avigdor-Goldsmid joined the Jockey Club and acted as Steward at several horse race meetings.

In the 1970 general election, he was elected as the Member of Parliament for Lichfield and Tamworth. He held the seat in the February 1974 general election. He lost his seat in the October 1974 general election to Labour's Bruce Grocott.

He inherited the d'Avigdor-Goldsmid Baronetcy on 11 December 1976 upon the death of Henry d'Avigdor-Goldsmid, his elder brother.

== Honours and decorations ==
On 31 August 1944, then Captain (temporary Major) d'Avigdor-Goldsmid was awarded the Military Cross (MC) "in recognition of gallant and distinguished services in Normandy". In the 1965 Queen's Birthday Honours, he was appointed Companion of the Order of the Bath (CB).

He was appointed to the honorary position of Colonel of the 4th/7th Royal Dragoon Guards on 6 June 1963.

Parliament of the United Kingdom
Preceded by Julian Snow	Member of Parliament for Lichfield and Tamworth; 1970 – October 1974	Succeeded by Bruce Grocott
Baronetage of the United Kingdom
Preceded by Henry d'Avigdor-Goldsmid	Baronet (of Somerhill); 1976–1987	Extinct
