= Anna Maria Goldsmid =

Anna Maria Goldsmid (17 September 1805 – 8 February 1889, London), benefactor and translator, was the eldest child of Isaac Lyon Goldsmid and the sister of Sir Francis Henry Goldsmid.

== Biography ==
Anna Maria Goldsmid was born 17 September 1805. Privately educated, she was an expert linguist, studying Italian with Dante Gabriel Rossetti. She also learnt French, German and Hebrew, studying the latter with Hyman Hurwitz. Her English literary tutor was Thomas Campbell.

Devoted to her father, she helped him in his work, notably the establishment of University College, London and the West London Synagogue.

Born an Orthodox Jew, she remained throughout her life very observant. However, she resented the powerlessness of women in Orthodox synagogues, and supported the West London Synagogue in the hope that it would give women a more active role in Jewish religious life.

Anna Maria Goldsmid devoted much time to educational matters, in which she developed a nationally recognised expertise. She founded the Jews' infants' school, London (1841), and re-established the Jews' Deaf and Dumb Home (1863). She was a patroness of University College Hospital and the Homoeopathic Hospital, both in London.

== Publications ==
- English translation, entitled "The Development of the Religious Idea", by Ludwig Philippsohn (1855)
- English translation, entitled "The Deicides: Analysis of the Life of Jesus", of the refutation, by J. Cohen of Marseilles, of the view that the Jews were Christ-killers (1872)
- English translation, entitled "Persecution of the Jews of Roumania, by a friend of his country, his people, and of liberty" (1872)
- Englished translation of the Prussian educational code (1872)
- "What girls should learn, what mothers should practise, and how husbands should help them : a lecture delivered March 29, 1874, and published by request" (1874)
- Many pamphlets on educational questions

== See also ==
- Goldsmid family
- History of the Jews in England
