= Denis Carter, Baron Carter =

British politician (1932–2006)

The Right Honourable The Lord Carter PC

Chief Whip of the House of Lords Captain of the Honourable Corps of Gentlemen-at-Arms
- In office 2 May 1997 – 29 May 2002
- Prime Minister: Tony Blair
- Preceded by: The Lord Strathclyde
- Succeeded by: The Lord Grocott

Member of the House of Lords
- Lord Temporal
- Life peerage 23 March 1987 – 18 December 2006

Personal details
- Born: 17 January 1932 London, England
- Died: 18 December 2006 (aged 74) London, England
- Party: Labour Co-operative
- Spouse: Teresa Greengoe (m. 1957)
- Children: 2
- Education: Worcester College, Oxford

Denis Victor Carter, Baron Carter PC (17 January 1932 – 18 December 2006) was a British agriculturalist and Labour Co-operative politician. He was made a life peer in 1987, and was chief whip in the House of Lords from 1997 to 2002.

== Early life and career ==
Carter was born in Elephant and Castle in London, where his parents, Albert and Annie Carter, worked in a tea warehouse and as an office cleaner, respectively. They later moved to Hove to run a sweetshop, and he was educated at the Jesuit Xaverian College in Brighton. He did national service in the Suez Canal Zone in Egypt from 1950 to 1952, and then studied at the East Sussex Institute of Agriculture and the Essex Institute of Agriculture, where he obtained a national diploma in agriculture, winning the Queen's Award for the country's highest marks. He later studied at Oxford, gaining a B.Litt. In 1957, he founded Agricultural Accounting and Management (AKC Ltd), which grew to manage and handle the accounting for a large number of farms, mainly in southern England and averaging 1,300 acres (5 km^{2}). In 1968, Carter founded and then worked for 30 years with United Oilseeds, which became a substantial farm trading operation, introducing large-scale oilseed rape marketing into Britain, and with WE & DT Cave, which raised thousands of pigs in Wiltshire.

== Political career ==
Carter stood for Parliament in Basingstoke at the 1970 general election, without success, defeated by Conservative politician David Mitchell.

He was nominated as a Labour "working peer" by Neil Kinnock, and raised to a life peerage as Baron Carter, of Devizes in the County of Wiltshire, on 23 March 1987. In opposition, he was Labour spokesman on social security in the House of Lords from 1988 to 1990, and on health from 1989 to 1992. He was also an opposition whip from 1987, and deputy chief whip from 1990 to 1992.

He was appointed Captain of the Gentlemen-at-Arms in the House of Lords when the Labour gained power in 1997, the post usually bestowed upon the Government Chief Whip in the Lords, and joined the Privy Council of the United Kingdom. He also chaired the BBC Rural Affairs and Agriculture Committee for five years from 1985, and in 1993 was appointed to chair the UK Co-operative Council. As the government chief whip in the House of Lords, he steered the governments ambitious programme of legislation, including the Human Rights Act, through the Lords, and was involved in the negotiations over the reform of the House of Lords that led to the compromise in the House of Lords Act 1999, which retained 92 hereditary peers in the first stage of reform.

In 2001 Sky News investigative journalist Gerard Tubb revealed Denis Carter's farming company was linked to illegal sales of swill fed pigs to a major supermarket supplier. In 2002 Sky News showed video of pigs kept in sow stalls on the company's Wiltshire farm, a practice which had been banned in the UK during his time in government. He denied any knowledge of wrongdoing or of animals being kept in stalls on his farm, but it was later revealed that four years earlier Janet Jones, the wife of the then leader of the Lords Lord Richards, had published a diary describing pigs kept in the same stalls on the farm. She wrote: "Denis told us he was not 'happy' with them." Denis Carter lost his government position in a cabinet reshuffle two months later in May 2002.

He was President of the Institute of Agricultural Management from 1996 to 1997, a post to which he returned from 2002 to 2006.

== Personal life and death ==
Denis Carter married Teresa Greengoe in 1957. They had two children, both of whom were born with congenital heart defects which caused blindness and hearing problems, and they both predeceased their father; their son, Andrew, died in 1982 at age 19, and their daughter, Catherine, died in 2004 at age 44. As a result of this, the parents set up the Andrew and Catherine Carter Foundation Trust to help disabled people. He was made an honorary member of the Royal Society of Psychiatrists in recognition of his work for the disabled. Carter died from cancer in London on 18 December 2006.

Party political offices
Preceded by The Lord Graham of Edmonton	Labour Chief Whip in the House of Lords; 1997–2002	Succeeded by The Lord Grocott
Political offices
Preceded by The Lord Strathclyde	Government Chief Whip in the House of Lords; 1997–2002	Succeeded by The Lord Grocott
Preceded by The Lord Strathclyde	Captain of the Honourable Corps of Gentlemen-at-Arms; 1997–2002	Succeeded by The Lord Grocott
