= Bruce Grocott, Baron Grocott =

British politician (born 1940)

The Right Honourable The Lord Grocott PC
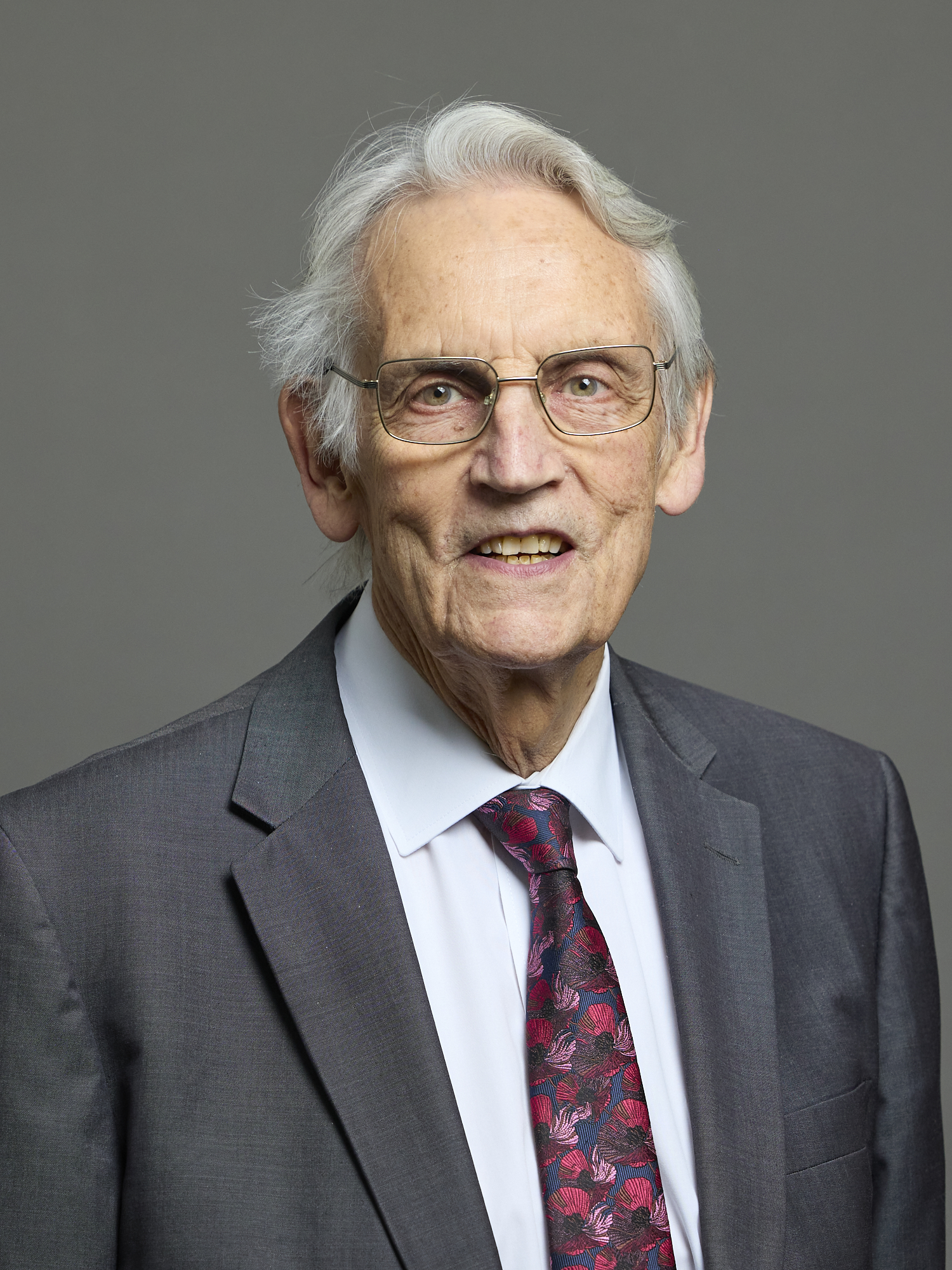
- Official portrait, 2025

Chief Whip of the House of Lords Captain of the Honourable Corps of Gentlemen-at-Arms
- In office 29 May 2002 – 24 January 2008
- Prime Minister: Tony Blair; Gordon Brown
- Preceded by: The Lord Carter
- Succeeded by: The Baroness Royall of Blaisdon

Lord-in-Waiting Government Whip
- In office 7 June 2001 – 29 May 2002
- Prime Minister: Tony Blair

Parliamentary Private Secretary to the Prime Minister
- In office 2 May 1997 – 8 June 2001
- Prime Minister: Tony Blair
- Preceded by: John Devereux Ward
- Succeeded by: David Hanson
Parliamentary offices
Member of the House of Lords
Lord Temporal
Life peerage 2 July 2001
Member of Parliament for Telford
In office 1 May 1997 – 14 May 2001
Preceded by	Himself (Note: As Member of Parliament for The Wrekin.)
Succeeded by	David Wright
Member of Parliament for The Wrekin
In office 11 June 1987 – 8 April 1997
Preceded by	Warren Hawksley
Succeeded by	Peter Bradley
Member of Parliament for Lichfield and Tamworth
In office 10 October 1974 – 7 April 1979
Preceded by	Jack d'Avigdor-Goldsmid
Succeeded by	John Heddle

Personal details
- Born: 1 November 1940 (age 85) Kings Langley, Hertfordshire, England
- Party: Labour
- Education: University of Leicester (BA); University of Manchester (MA)

Bruce Joseph Grocott, Baron Grocott PC (born 1 November 1940) is a British politician who has been a Member of the House of Lords since 2001. A member of the Labour Party, he served as a Member of Parliament for four terms between 1974 and 2001, representing constituencies in Staffordshire and Shropshire.

== Early life ==
Grocott was born in Kings Langley near Watford, Hertfordshire. He received a Bachelor of Arts in Politics from the University of Leicester in 1962. Grocott later obtained a Master of Arts from the University of Manchester for research into Local Government.

He was appointed to the post of lecturer, and later a senior lecturer, at the City of Birmingham College of Commerce (later Birmingham Polytechnic, now Birmingham City University). During this time he was elected to Bromsgrove Urban District Council. From 1972 to 1974 he was a principal lecturer at North Staffordshire Polytechnic.

== House of Commons ==
His first attempt to become a member of Parliament was in the 1970 election when he stood unsuccessfully for South West Hertfordshire. He was then selected as a candidate and elected as Member of Parliament for Lichfield and Tamworth in October 1974, in which position he became Parliamentary Private Secretary to the Minister for Local Government and Planning, and later the Minister of Agriculture.

He lost his seat at the 1979 general election and joined Central Television as a presenter and producer, working on programmes such as Left, Right and Centre, Central Lobby and Central Weekend.

He was re-elected for The Wrekin in 1987 and he was very shortly thereafter appointed Deputy Shadow Leader of the House to Jack Cunningham before becoming advisor to the Leader of the Opposition, Neil Kinnock and, later, a Foreign Affairs Spokesman under John Smith. He served as Parliamentary private secretary to Tony Blair, first as Leader of the Opposition and then Prime Minister, from 1994 until 2001.

He transferred to Telford in 1997 when The Wrekin was divided. He served this seat until the 2001 general election, when he stepped down from the Commons.

== House of Lords ==
He was made a life peer under the title of Baron Grocott, of Telford, in the County of Shropshire, on 2 July 2001, quickly being promoted to a government whip in the House of Lords.

From 2002 to 2008 he was the Government Chief Whip in the House of Lords as well as Captain of the Gentlemen-at-Arms, the honorary post usually held by the Chief Whip. As the Chief Whip, he was sworn of the Privy Council in 2002. He has promoted further reform of the Lords, including attempts to abolish by-elections for hereditary peers.

In October 2012 it was announced that Lord Grocott had been elected as the next chancellor of the University of Leicester, the first time in the university's history that a former student had been appointed to the post. He was installed as chancellor at the degree ceremony in DeMontfort Hall on 24 January 2013. His term finished in July 2018 and he was replaced by Lord Willetts.

== Personal life ==
Grocott is married with two sons and lives in Staffordshire.

== Notes ==
Parliament of the United Kingdom
Preceded by Jack d'Avigdor-Goldsmid	Member of Parliament for Lichfield and Tamworth; 1974–1979	Succeeded by John Heddle
Preceded by Warren Hawksley	Member of Parliament for The Wrekin; 1987–1997	Succeeded by Peter Bradley
New constituency	Member of Parliament for Telford; 1997–2001	Succeeded by David Wright
Political offices
Preceded by The Lord Carter	Government Chief Whip in the House of Lords; 2002–2008	Succeeded by The Baroness Royall of Blaisdon
Preceded by The Lord Carter	Captain of the Honourable Corps of Gentlemen-at-Arms; 2002–2008	Succeeded by The Baroness Royall of Blaisdon
Party political offices
Preceded by The Lord Carter	Labour Chief Whip in the House of Lords; 2002–2008	Succeeded by The Baroness Royall of Blaisdon
Academic offices
Preceded by Peter Williams	Chancellor of the University of Leicester; 2013–2018	Succeeded by The Lord Willetts
Orders of precedence in the United Kingdom
Preceded by The Lord Adebowale	Gentlemen; Baron Grocott	Followed by The Lord Clark of Windermere
