= Louisa Goldsmid =

British philanthropist and education activist

Lady Louisa Goldsmid
- Born: Louisa Sophia Goldsmid; 2 September 1819
- Died: 7 December 1908 (aged 89); London
- Known for: advocacy of women's higher education
- Title: Lady
- Spouse: Francis Henry Goldsmid (m. 1839; died 1878)
- Relatives: Isaac Lyon Goldsmid (uncle)

Lady Louisa Sophia Goldsmid (2 September 1819 – 12 June 1908) was a British philanthropist and education activist who targeted her life at improving education provision for British women. She took a leading role in persuading Cambridge University to create women graduates.

== Life ==
She was born into a privileged Anglo-Jewish family who were closely related to other Jewish families who organised British Jewry. She continued her community's habit of endogamy by taking her first cousin Francis Goldsmid as her husband. Her mother-in-law was the women's education activist Isabel Goldsmid and her uncle Isaac Lyon Goldsmid helped to change the laws that restricted the rights of British Jews. The wedding was conducted by the Ashkenazi chief rabbi in 1839. Three years later the major schism of British Jews happened and Goldsmid and her husband joined the West London British Reform Jews. The Reform Jews favoured more involvement for women in their religion than the Orthodox Jews.

She joined the ladies' committee of the Governesses' Benevolent Institution in 1849. This group which was founded by Anglican clergy had just helped to create Queen's College, Harley Street which was the first place in England that women could undertake higher education.

In 1859 she became Lady Louisa Goldsmid when her husband inherited the title of second baronet. She became involved with the Langham Place Circle via her mother-in-law Isabel Goldsmid. With Isabel's daughter Anna Maria Goldsmid this made three Goldsmids who were part of the Langham Place circle. Louisa became the treasurer of the circle and friends with Emily Davies who was the secretary and the major activist of the circle. The circle's aim was to find a way for women to undertake university education. In 1865 this was started when Cambridge University submitted to Emily Davies' advocacy and allowed females into their local examinations. This led to the creation of Girton College, Cambridge. Goldsmid's interest in education was temporarily held in abeyance as she tried to realise the larger goal of gaining the vote for women. She found an advocate in John Stuart Mill but he believed that all women should be given the vote. Goldsmid argued against this believing that it was more realistic to ask that the vote be given only to spinsters and widows. Mill proceeded with his more ambitious proposal and the cause was lost. At this point Goldsmid realised that she and Emily Davies should ignore the campaign to gain votes for women and concentrate on the more achievable goal of gaining the right of women to gain university degrees. London University allowed women to gain degrees in 1878. This was the same year that her husband died and Goldsmid's philanthropy established three scholarships for female pianists. Goldsmid continued her advocacy of women's education albeit for middle class women. (In 1887 Cambridge University submitted to change and allowed women to take the tripos examinations.) Alongside Barbara Bodichon and George Eliot, Goldsmid supported both Hertha Ayrton's university education at Girton and later provided funds for her to take out patents for her inventions.

After Sir Francis Goldsmid died the pianist Agnes Zimmermann moved into the Goldsmid household and they were close friends. Zimmermann was said to have shared eighteen years of "devoted attention" with Goldsmid and it has been speculated that this was a lesbian relationship.

In 1881 the leaders of the Jewish community in London were being criticised for not campaigning against pogroms in the Russian Empire. Her husband's leadership was missed and it was Goldsmid's support together with an anonymous writer named "Juriscontalus" and Asher Myers of The Jewish Chronicle that action was taken. Public meetings were held across the country and Jewish and Christian leaders in Britain spoke out against the atrocities.

Goldsmid died at 13 Portman Square on 7 December 1908. This was her London home and previously a meeting place for society with Goldsmid as hostess. Goldsmid left a statue title "Lost Innocence" by Emilio Santarelli to UCL.
