= Elizabeth Lepper =

British Physician

Lepper in 1963 by Dame Albertine Winner (detail)

Elizabeth Herdman Lepper CBE, M.B., B.S. (3 July 1883 – 23 December 1971) was a British physician and pathologist. She served in the Royal Army Medical Corps in Malta during World War I. She was a member of the Association of Registered Medical Woman, British Medical Association and the Pathological Society.

== Education ==
Lepper t was born on 3 July 1883. She trained at the London School of Medicine for Women (now the Royal Free Hospital), graduating in 1907.

== Training and career ==
Lepper was appointed to junior positions at the Royal Free Hospital and the Elizabeth Garrett Anderson Hospital. She was the Richard Hollins research scholar at the Middlesex Hospital, in the cancer research department. She was also the Beit Memorial Fellow in medical research and attended outpatients at the South London Hospital. She was elected a member of the Metropolitan Counties Branch of the British Medical Association.

During World War I, Louisa Aldrich-Blake, then surgeon at the Elizabeth Garrett Anderson Hospital and Dean of the London School of Medicine for Women, approached all the women on the Medical Register, to ask if they would be willing to serve with the Royal Army Medical Corps. Lepper was one of the 48 women who enrolled, and embarked for Malta as part of the Women's Medical Unit on 2 August 1916. From 20 June 1917 she was attached to the British Salonica Force. For this work she was appointed as Commander of the Most Excellent Order of the British Empire.

On her return to the Elizabeth Garret Anderson Hospital in 1920 she became a pathologist, which role she performed until her retirement in 1937. During that time, she was also working at the Lister Institute and researched the contents of ovarian tumours and cysts.

Lepper was known to be a great improviser and it was being said among the colleges, that if she was stranded on a desert island would set up a working laboratory within weeks.

== Later life ==
On her retirement Lepper travelled the world, until returning to the United Kingdom before the outbreak of World War II. She lived with Dorothy Christian Hare, her long-time friend and fellow physician in Falmouth, Cornwall, where she was a member of local societies promoting local theatre and the arts. She followed various hobbies and interests like natural history, travelling, and playing the violin.

Lepper died at her home in Falmouth on 23 December 1971 at the age of 88.
