= Edward Hare =

English surgeon (1812–1897)

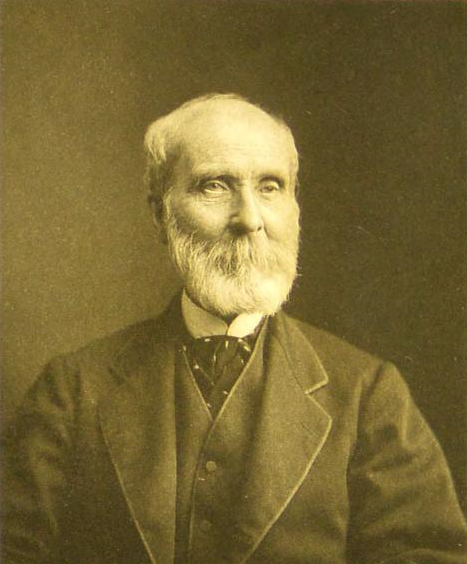
- Born: 27 December 1812; Stanhoe, Norfolk, England
- Died: 13 February 1897 (aged 84); Bath, Somerset, England
- Occupations: Surgeon, writer

Edward Hare (27 December 1812 – 13 February 1897) was an English surgeon and writer. He served as Director-General of Hospitals in Bengal, India. Hare is best known for his medical work in using quinine for treatment of malaria fevers. He was also a vegetarianism activist.

== Biography ==
Edward Hare was born in Stanhoe. He was educated at King's College London and Middlesex Hospital. He took the M.R.C.S in 1837. Hare became a member of the Royal College of Surgeons in 1938. He was commissioned as Assistant Surgeon in Bengal in 1839. In March 1853, he became Surgeon and Surgeon Major in 1859.

Hare served during the First Anglo-Afghan War (1840–1842) at Kabul and under General Robert Sale at Jalalabad. He received Afghan and Jalalabad medals. In 1852, during the Second Anglo-Burmese War he was in medical charge of the First European Bengal Fusiliers. He was present at the recapture of Pegu and received the medal. He also served in medical charge of the Second European Bengal Fusiliers during the siege of Delhi and received the medal. Hare was Inspector-General of Hospitals, Bengal in the Indian Medical Service until 1865.

Hare married Mary Ann Wood in 1863. Hare's daughter, Dorothy Christian Hare was a physician. He died in Bath on 13 February 1897. His letters and notes were edited into Memoirs of Edward Hare by his son and published in 1900.

== Quinine ==
Hare experimented with quinine for treatment of malaria fevers. Hare who had observed military action with the British forces in Afghanistan in 1839, used quinine to treat soldiers near the Nepal border. In 1847, Hare published his findings in a pamphlet which caused a great sensation throughout the medical community in India. The Calcutta Medical Board obtained a sanction from Lord Dalhousie to bring Hare to Calcutta and place him in charge of a wing at the General Hospital. In a year, Hare had reduced the death-rate from fevers to one-twelfth of its average rate for the previous twenty years. Hare's system of using quinine to treat fever in malaria was supported by the Medical Board and was used throughout India. Over a period of nine years, he treated 7,000 European soldiers with quinine and recorded a mortality rate of less than 0.5 percent.

== Vegetarianism ==
Hare was a vegetarian. He served as Vice-President of the Vegetarian Society. Historian James Gregory has noted that Hare's diet consisted of "two daily meals of toasted or unleavened bread, weak tea, vegetables cooked in butter, farinaceous puddings and fruit."

In 1873, Hare authored a biography of vegetarian physician William Lambe.

== Selected publications ==
- Hints for an Improved Treatment of Remittent Fever and Dysentery (1847)
- Malarious Fever (1864)
- The Life of Dr William Lamb: The Vegetarian (The Dietetic Reformer and Vegetarian Messenger, 1872)
- The Life of William Lambe, M.D., Fellow of the Royal College of Physicians (1873)
- Memoirs of Edward Hare, C.S.I., Late Inspector-General of Hospitals, Bengal (1900)
