= Valerie Vaz =

British politician (born 1954)

The Right Honourable Valerie Vaz MP
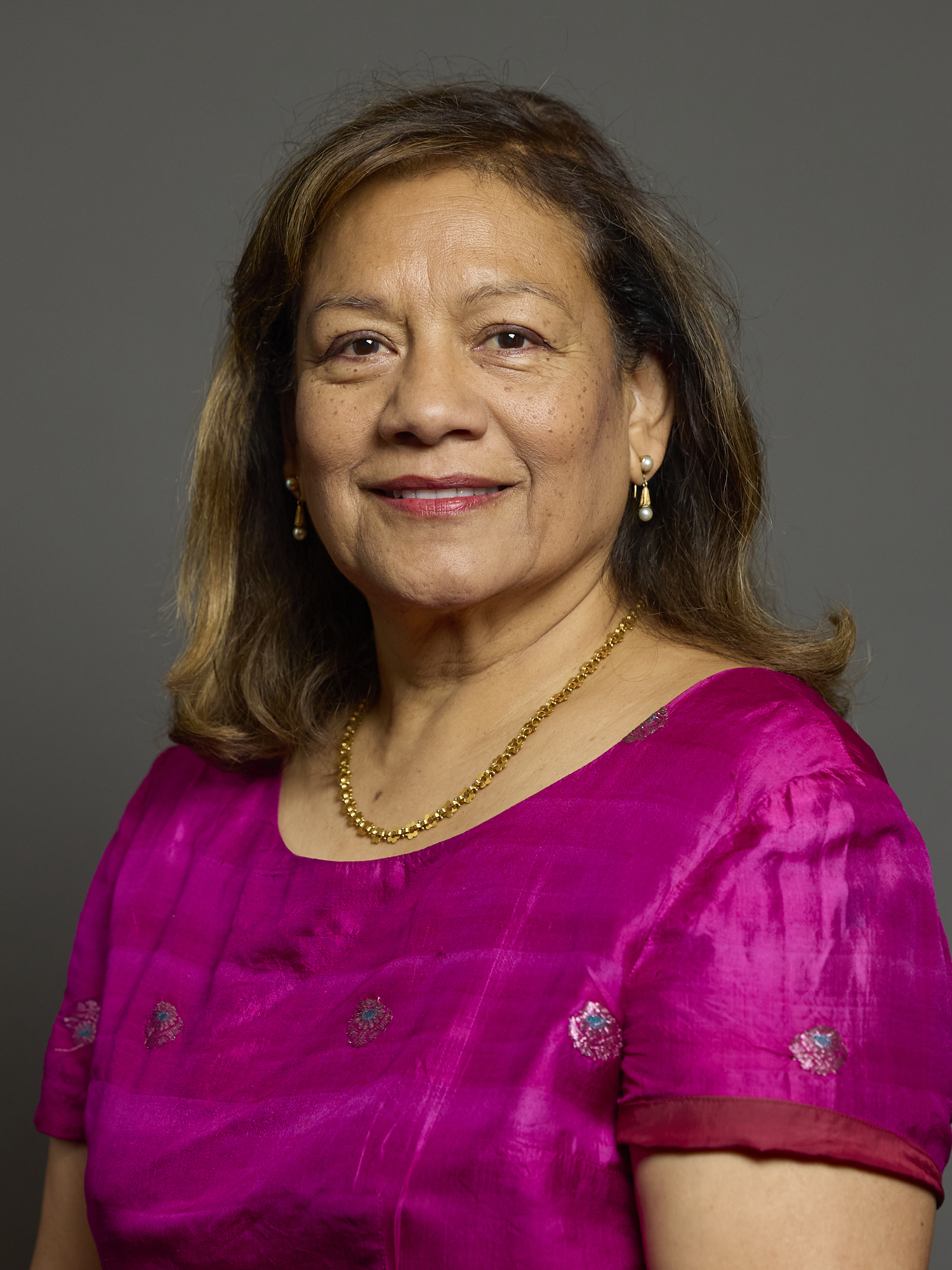
- Official portrait, 2024

Shadow Leader of the House of Commons
- In office 6 October 2016 – 9 May 2021
- Leader: Jeremy Corbyn; Keir Starmer
- Preceded by: Paul Flynn
- Succeeded by: Thangam Debbonaire

Member of Parliament for Walsall and Bloxwich Walsall South (2010–2024)
- Incumbent
- Assumed office 6 May 2010
- Preceded by: Bruce George
- Majority: 4,914 (13.2%)

Personal details
- Born: Valerie Carol Marian Vaz; 7 December 1954 (age 71) Aden Colony (now Yemen)
- Party: Labour
- Spouse: Paul Townsend
- Relations: Keith Vaz (brother)
- Children: 1
- Education: Twickenham County Grammar School; Bedford College
- Alma mater: Bedford College, London (BSc)
- Occupation: Politician; solicitor
- Website: Official website

Valerie Carol Marian Vaz (born 7 December 1954) is a British Labour politician and former solicitor who has been the Member of Parliament (MP) for Walsall and Bloxwich, previously Walsall South, since 2010. She served as Shadow Leader of the House of Commons from 2016 to 2021 in the Shadow Cabinets of Jeremy Corbyn and Keir Starmer.

== Early life and career ==
Valerie Vaz was born on 7 December 1954 in Aden (now part of Yemen) to Anthony Xavier and Merlyn Verona Vaz. Her family originates from Goa in India, and settled in Twickenham and then East Sheen. Vaz is a distant relative of Saint Joseph Vaz, a 17th-century missionary. Her father, previously a correspondent for The Times of India, worked in the airline industry, while her mother worked two jobs, as a teacher and for Marks & Spencer. Her father died by suicide when she was 16.

Vaz was educated at Twickenham County Grammar School and later Bedford College, London, where she completed a BSc (Hons) degree in Biochemistry in 1978. The same year, she matriculated at Sidney Sussex College, Cambridge to do research, but did not take a degree.

In 1984 she qualified as a solicitor and subsequently worked on legal issues for local government in London. She set up her own law firm, Townsend Vaz Solicitors, and has sat as a Deputy District Judge in the County Court on the Midland and Oxford Circuit.

Vaz was a councillor in the London Borough of Ealing from 1986 to 1990, and the council's Deputy Leader from 1988 to 1989.

At the 1999 European Parliament elections, Vaz stood in the East Midlands, but was not elected.

In 2001, she joined the Government Legal Service, and worked at the Treasury Solicitors Department and the Ministry of Justice. She worked as a presenter and interviewer for the BBC TV programme Network East in 1987.

== Parliamentary career ==
Vaz stood as the Labour candidate in Twickenham at the 1987 general election, coming third with 8.4% of the vote behind the incumbent Conservative MP Toby Jessel and the Liberal Party candidate.

At the 2010 general election, Vaz was elected to Parliament as MP for Walsall South with 39.7% of the vote and a majority of 1,755.

In June 2010 she was selected as a Labour member of the Health Select Committee.

At the 2015 general election, Vaz was re-elected as MP for Walsall South with an increased vote share of 47.2% and an increased majority of 6,007.

In October 2016 she was appointed to Jeremy Corbyn's shadow cabinet as the Shadow Leader of the House of Commons.

At the snap 2017 general election, Vaz was again re-elected with an increased vote share of 57.4% and an increased majority of 8,892.

In October 2018, it was revealed that two former members of Vaz's parliamentary staff had alleged that they were bullied by her, but the complaints were not followed up by the party.

On 8 October 2019, Vaz was appointed as a member of the Privy Council, giving her the style of The Right Honourable for life.

At the 2019 general election, Vaz was again re-elected, with a decreased vote share of 49.1% and a decreased majority of 3,456.

She continued in her role as Shadow Leader of the House after the election of Keir Starmer as the Leader of the Labour Party. In the 2021 British shadow cabinet reshuffle, she returned to the backbenches.

On 24 May 2021, Vaz was criticised after she suggested that the condition of Boris Johnson was exaggerated when he was in intensive care with COVID-19.

Vaz is chair of the All-Party Parliamentary Group on Epilepsy.

Due to the 2023 Periodic Review of Westminster constituencies, Vaz's constituency of Walsall South was abolished, and replaced with Walsall and Bloxwich. At the 2024 general election, Vaz was elected to Parliament as MP for Walsall and Bloxwich with 33.5% of the vote and a majority of 4,914.

== Personal life ==
Vaz is married to Paul Townsend. The couple have one daughter. Her hobbies include music and gardening. Her younger brother Keith Vaz was the Labour MP for Leicester East from 1987 to 2019, while her sister Penny is a lawyer. Her late mother Merlyn Vaz was formerly a Labour councillor in Leicester. She is a Catholic.

Parliament of the United Kingdom
Preceded by Bruce George	Member of Parliament for Walsall South; 2010–present	Incumbent
Political offices
Preceded by Paul Flynn	Shadow Leader of the House of Commons; 2016–2021	Succeeded by Thangam Debbonaire
