= Dorothy Christian Hare =

English physician

Dorothy Christian Hare CBE DPH FRCP
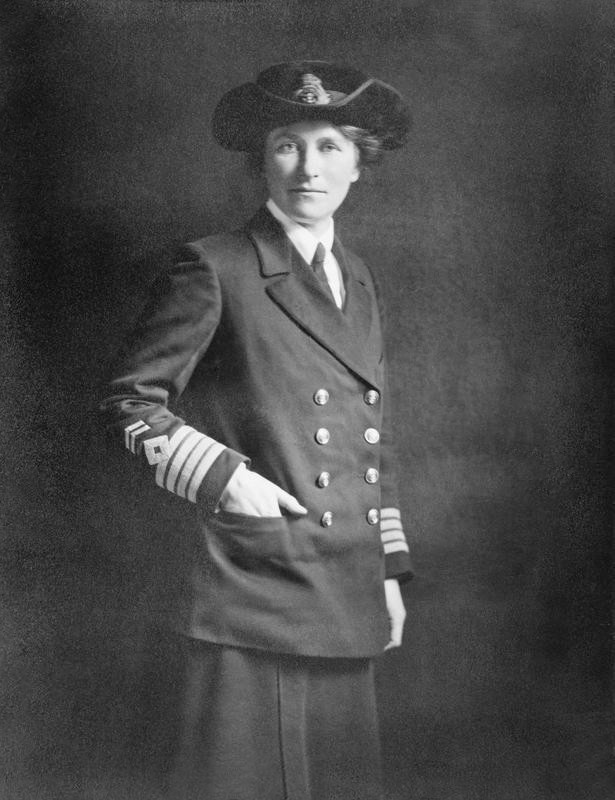
- Hare in the Women's Royal Navy Service
- Born: 14 September 1876; Bath, Somerset, England
- Died: 19 January 1967 (aged 90)
- Occupation: Physician
- Parent(s): Mary Wood and Edward Hare

Dorothy Christian Hare, CBE (14 September 1876 – 19 January 1967) was an English physician. She joined the Royal Army Medical Corps and Women's Royal Naval Service during the First World War where she became concerned about the treatment of venereal disease in women. Upon returning to England she established two hostels to improve conditions for such cases. Following a career at the Royal Free Hospital and the Elizabeth Garrett Anderson Hospital she became the third woman and first female general physician to be elected a fellow of the Royal College of Physicians.

== Early life ==
Hare was born on 14 September 1876 in Bath, Somerset to Mary Wood and Edward Hare, who had been the Indian Medical Service's Deputy Inspector General of Hospitals. She was educated privately and enjoyed singing. She was, however, keen to receive a formal education and entered Cheltenham Ladies College at the age of 19. Hare later studied at the London School of Medicine for Women from which she received a Bachelor of Medicine, Bachelor of Surgery in 1905 and became a house physician first at the Royal Free Hospital and then the Elizabeth Garrett Anderson Hospital. Hare returned to the Royal Free Hospital as an assistant pathologist. She was awarded a Doctor of Medicine degree in 1908 and a Doctor of Public Health degree in 1912. She practised general medicine at Cambridge until 1916.

== First World War ==
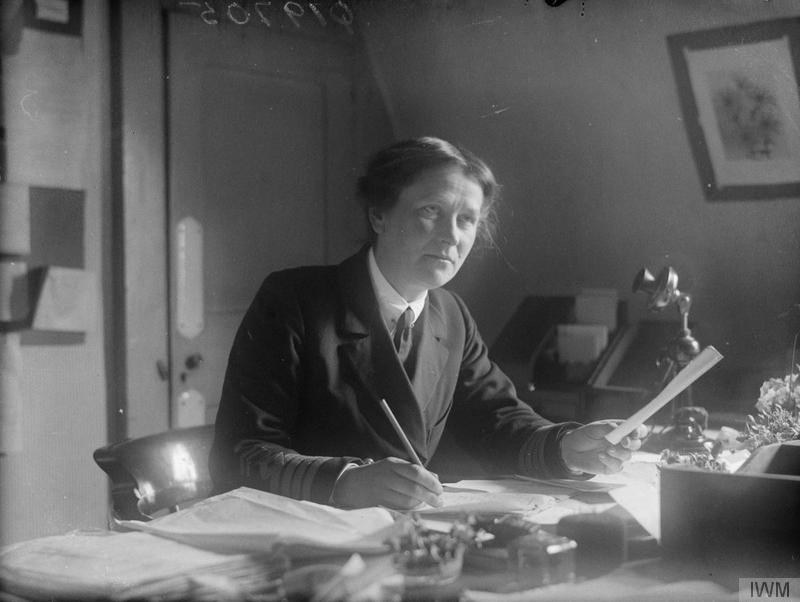
Hare at her desk during the First World War

Hare joined the Royal Army Medical Corps during the First World War and in 1916 was posted to Malta. She was appointed General Medical Director of the Women's Royal Naval Service in 1918 and she received appointment as a Commander of the Order of the British Empire on 9 May 1919 in recognition of her service in that role.

In the course of the war she encountered many cases of venereal disease. To improve treatment Hare established, with her friend Berenice d'Avigdor, two hostels to treat women – one for general cases and one for pregnant women. These women would often be unable to find alternative lodgings due to the disease. Sir Thomas Barlow, 1st Baronet served as president of the hostels, Hare as chairman and d'Avigdor as secretary until they closed during the Second World War, by which point the discovery of penicillin had rendered treatment much more effective and quick.

== Later career ==
Hare became medical registrar of the Royal Free Hospital in 1920 and was elected a member of the Royal College of Physicians the same year. She progressed to become an assistant physician and then physician at the Royal Free and Elizabeth Garrett Anderson Hospitals. In 1936 she became the third woman and first female general physician to be elected a fellow of the Royal College of Physicians. During this period Hare published a book on the treatment of diabetes (1933, 2nd edition 1935) and papers on colitis in the British Medical Journal, The Lancet and The Practitioner. In 1935 and 1936 she delivered addresses to the Royal Society of Medicine on colitis and chronic rheumatic conditions.

== Retirement ==
Hare retired in 1937 to travel around the world before returning to live in Falmouth, Cornwall with her long-time friend and fellow physician Elizabeth Lepper. Hare was a keen amateur artist who worked in oils, water colours and scratchboard. She organised Arts Council exhibitions in Falmouth and worked to revive the Royal Cornwall Polytechnic Society to train artists. Hare died on 19 January 1967.
