= Henry d'Avigdor-Goldsmid =

British Army officer, company director and politician

Sir Henry d'Avigdor-Goldsmid, Bt.

Major Sir Henry Joseph d'Avigdor-Goldsmid, 2nd Baronet, DSO, MC, TD, DL, JP (10 June 1909 – 11 December 1976), sometimes known as Harry d'Avigdor-Goldsmid, was a British Army officer, company director and politician.

== Early life, education and military career ==
The eldest son of Sir Osmond d'Avigdor-Goldsmid, 1st Baronet, d'Avigdor-Goldsmid went to Sandroyd School then Harrow School and Balliol College, Oxford. On the death of his father in 1940, d'Avigdor-Goldsmid inherited Somerhill House near Tonbridge, Kent.

On 12 June 1938 he was commissioned as a second lieutenant into 4th Battalion of the Queen's Own Royal West Kent Regiment, a Territorial Army (TA) unit. He was to serve with the battalion during the early stages of the Second World War, which began in September 1939, including at the Battle of France the following year, from where he, along with the rest of his battalion, was evacuated from Dunkirk back to the United Kingdom.

At some point he transferred to the Reconnaissance Corps and served as Commander of "B" Squadron of the 53rd Reconnaissance Regiment, part of the 53rd (Welsh) Infantry Division, throughout the North-West Europe campaign of 1944–45. For his services in the war he was twice mentioned in dispatches and awarded the Distinguished Service Order and Military Cross in 1945.

== Postwar political career ==
Following the war, d'Avigdor-Goldsmid left the army and became a member of Kent County Council from 1946 to 1953. He was made a Freeman of the City of London and became a Justice of the Peace, Deputy Lieutenant (1949) and High Sheriff of Kent for 1953. His business career as a banker and bullion broker was marked by being Chairman of the Anglo-Israel Bank from 1961, and Chairman of Pergamon Press from 1969 to 1971.

At the 1955 general election, d'Avigdor-Goldsmid was elected as Conservative Member of Parliament for Walsall South. He was recruited by Duncan Sandys, then Minister of Housing, to be his Parliamentary Private Secretary but held the post for only a year.

Following the 1970 general election, d'Avigdor-Goldsmid was joined in the House of Commons by his younger brother James who won the nearby seat of Lichfield and Tamworth. In that Parliament, Henry served as Chairman of the Select Committee on Nationalized Industries and of that on Public Expenditure. In 1973 he was appointed a member of the Horserace Totalisator Board. He stood down from Parliament at the February 1974 general election.

== Personal life ==
Following the death of his 21-year-old daughter Sarah at sea in 1963, Sir Henry commissioned a stained glass window at thirteenth-century All Saints' Church, Tudeley. It was designed by the eminent artist Marc Chagall, and when it was installed in 1967, Chagall was so inspired by the effect that he committed to remaking the other eleven windows between 1969 and 1985.

The novelist, Anthony Powell, a close friend, dedicated the novel, Casanova's Chinese Restaurant, to him and his wife, Rosie.

He was a member of White's and Beefsteak Club.

== Notes ==
- Hansard 1803–2005: contributions in Parliament by Henry d'Avigdor-Goldsmid
- D’Avigdor-Goldsmid, Major Sir Henry Joseph, (10 June 1909–11 Dec 1976), DL, JP; Major RAC TA, late Royal West Kent Regiment https://doi.org/10.1093/ww/9780199540884.013.U153762 Who's Who (published online: 1 December 2007)
- British Army Officers 1939–1945

Parliament of the United Kingdom
New constituency	Member of Parliament for Walsall South; 1955 – February 1974	Succeeded by Bruce George
Baronetage of the United Kingdom
Preceded by Osmond d'Avigdor-Goldsmid	Baronet (of Somerhill); 1940–1976	Succeeded by Jack d'Avigdor-Goldsmid
