= Julian Snow, Baron Burntwood =

British politician (1910–1982)

The Right Honourable The Lord Burntwood

Under-Secretary of State for Social Services
- In office 1 November 1968 – 13 October 1969
- Prime Minister: Harold Wilson
- Preceded by: Office created
- Succeeded by: John Dunwoody

Parliamentary Secretary to the Ministry of Health
- In office 7 January 1967 – 1 November 1968
- Prime Minister: Harold Wilson
- Preceded by: Charles Loughlin
- Succeeded by: Office abolished

Parliamentary Secretary for Aviation
- In office 6 April 1966 – 7 January 1967
- Prime Minister: Harold Wilson
- Preceded by: John Stonehouse
- Succeeded by: Office abolished

Parliamentary Secretary for Technology
- In office 19 October 1964 – 6 April 1966
- Prime Minister: Harold Wilson
- Preceded by: Office created
- Succeeded by: Peter Shore

Vice-Chamberlain of the Household
- In office 10 August 1945 – 9 December 1946
- Prime Minister: Clement Attlee
- Preceded by: Arthur Young
- Succeeded by: Michael Stewart

Member of the House of Lords
- Lord Temporal
- Life peerage 21 September 1970 – 24 January 1982

Member of Parliament for Lichfield and Tamworth
- In office 23 February 1950 – 18 June 1970
- Preceded by: Cecil Poole
- Succeeded by: Jack d'Avigdor-Goldsmid

Member of Parliament for Portsmouth Central
- In office 5 July 1945 – 23 February 1950
- Preceded by: Ralph Beaumont
- Succeeded by: Constituency abolished

Personal details
- Born: Julian Ward Snow; 24 February 1910
- Died: 24 January 1982 (aged 71)
- Party: Labour
- Spouse: Flavia Blois (m. 1948; died 1980)
- Children: 1

Julian Ward Snow, Baron Burntwood (24 February 1910 – 24 January 1982) was a British Labour Party politician.

== Political career ==
He was a Member of Parliament for Portsmouth Central from 1945. When that constituency was abolished he represented Lichfield and Tamworth from 1950 until stepping down at the 1970 general election, when his seat was won for the Conservatives by James d'Avigdor-Goldsmid. After his retirement he was created a life peer on 21 September 1970 as Baron Burntwood, of Burntwood in the County of Stafford.

During his time as an MP, Snow also served as Parliamentary Secretary to the Ministry of Health.

He never made a speech from the backbenches, although he did speak in his role as Vice-Chamberlain of the Household.

== Personal life ==
Snow was educated at Haileybury College and the Sorbonne. He was employed by Dunlop Rubber Co. Ltd in India and East Africa in 1930–1937. He joined the Royal Artillery in 1939 and served till the end of World War II. He married the artist Flavia Blois, daughter of Sir Ralph Barrett MacNaghten Blois, 9th Bt., and Winifred Grace Hegan Kennard, on 20 August 1948. They had one daughter; she died in 1980.

Lord Burntwood was a founding member and the first chairman of the Institution of Environmental Sciences, which holds the annual Burntwood Lecture in his memory.

Parliament of the United Kingdom
Preceded by Ralph Beaumont	Member of Parliament for Portsmouth Central; 1945–1950	Constituency abolished
New constituency	Member of Parliament for Lichfield and Tamworth; 1950–1970	Succeeded by James d'Avigdor-Goldsmid
