= Walsall South =

Parliamentary constituency in the United Kingdom, 1955 onwards

Coordinates: 52.57°N 1.98°W

- Former borough constituency for the House of Commons
- Boundary of Walsall South in West Midlands

- Location of West Midlands within England
- County: West Midlands
- Electorate: 66,082 (December 2010)
- Major settlements: Darlaston and Walsall (part)

1955–2024
- Seats: One
- Created from: Walsall
- Replaced by: Walsall and Bloxwich

Walsall South was a constituency (Note: A borough constituency (for the purposes of election expenses and type of returning officer)) in the West Midlands in the House of Commons of the UK Parliament. It was represented from 1974 until abolition by members of the Labour Party. (Note: As with all constituencies, the constituency elected one Member of Parliament (MP) by the first past the post system of election at least every five years.)

Further to the completion of the 2023 Periodic Review of Westminster constituencies, the seat was abolished. Subject to boundary changes, it was reformed as Walsall and Bloxwich, first contested at the 2024 general election

== Constituency profile ==
The constituency was in the heart of an area traditionally focussed on manufacturing, which retained many mechanical and engineering jobs in its economy. This constituency had accessible links to the cities of Wolverhampton and Birmingham.

Workless claimants, registered jobseekers, were in November 2012 higher than the national average of 3.8% and regional average of 4.7%, at 7.7% of the population based on a statistical compilation by The Guardian.

== Boundaries ==
Map of boundaries 2010-2024

Walsall South was one of three constituencies in the Metropolitan Borough of Walsall and specifically covered Darlaston, Moxley, Pheasey and the southern part of Walsall, including the town centre.

1955–1974: The County Borough of Walsall wards of Bridge, Caldmore, Paddock, Palfrey, and Pleck, and the Urban District of Aldridge.

1974–1983: The County Borough of Walsall wards of Darlaston North, Darlaston South, Hatherton, Paddock, Palfrey, Pleck, and St Matthew's.

1983–2010: The Metropolitan Borough of Walsall wards of Bentley and Darlaston North, Darlaston South, Paddock, Palfrey, Pheasey, Pleck, and St Matthew's.

2010–2024: The Metropolitan Borough of Walsall wards of Bentley and Darlaston North, Darlaston South, Paddock, Palfrey, Pheasey Park Farm, Pleck, and St Matthew's.

== History ==
The constituency was first contested in 1955 largely from Walsall constituency, and won by its only Conservative MP to date, Major-General Sir Henry d'Avigdor-Goldsmid.

Bruce George of the Labour Party won the seat when the Major-General stood down in the February 1974 general election, he too was a prominent supporter of the armed services and led Britain's NATO delegation to its Parliament, subsequently becoming its vice-president. While never a prominent frontbencher, George held Walsall South until his retirement at the 2010 general election, when he was succeeded by Valerie Vaz (also of the Labour Party).

Synopsis of results

The Conservative holding of the seat through the First Wilson Ministry reveals that in these early elections the seat was not a bellwether. On the 1974 transfer in power to Wilson again, here the result proved to be a watershed election. Labour's majorities since this, only in fairly good years for the Conservatives, such as during the Thatcher ministry as well as in 1992 and 2010 and 2019 general elections have been marginal. (Note: 6.3% and 4.3% of the vote respectively in the specific election years given.) In terms of length of a party's representation, Labour represented this area continuously for a total of 45 years as of 2019.

== Abolition ==
Further to the completion of the 2023 Periodic Review of Westminster constituencies, the seat was abolished for the 2024 general election, with its contents distributed three ways:

- Approximately half the electorate, including Walsall town centre, combined with the majority of Walsall North (also to be abolished) to form the new seat of Walsall and Bloxwich
- Pheasey Park Farm and part of the Paddock ward transferred to Aldridge-Brownhills
- Darlaston and Bentley transferred to Wolverhampton South East

== Members of Parliament ==
Election	Member	Party
1955	Henry d'Avigdor-Goldsmid	Conservative
Feb 1974	Bruce George	Labour
2010	Valerie Vaz	Labour

== Elections ==
=== Elections in the 2010s ===
General election 2019: Walsall South
Party	Candidate	Votes	%	±%
Labour	Valerie Vaz	20,872	49.1	–8.3
Conservative	Gurjit Bains	17,416	41.0	+3.8
Brexit Party	Gary Hughes	1,660	3.9	New
Liberal Democrats	Paul Harris	1,602	3.8	+2.5
Green	John Macefield	634	1.5	New
Independent	Akheil Mehboob	288	0.7	New
Majority		3,456	8.1	–12.1
Turnout		42,472	62.4	–4.0
Labour hold		Swing	–6.1	

General election 2017: Walsall South
Party	Candidate	Votes	%	±%
Labour	Valerie Vaz	25,286	57.4	+10.2
Conservative	James Bird	16,394	37.2	+4.4
UKIP	Derek Bennett	1,805	4.1	–11.5
Liberal Democrats	Anna Purvis	587	1.3	–0.3
Majority		8,892	20.2	+5.8
Turnout		44,072	66.4	+4.6
Labour hold		Swing	+2.9	

General election 2015: Walsall South
Party	Candidate	Votes	%	±%
Labour	Valerie Vaz	19,740	47.2	+7.5
Conservative	Sue Arnold	13,733	32.8	–2.6
UKIP	Derek Bennett	6,540	15.6	+7.2
Green	Charlotte Fletcher	1,149	2.7	New
Liberal Democrats	Joel Kenrick	676	1.6	–12.8
Majority		6,007	14.4	+10.1
Turnout		41,838	61.8	–1.3
Labour hold		Swing	+5.0	

General election 2010: Walsall South
Party	Candidate	Votes	%	±%
Labour	Valerie Vaz	16,211	39.7	–9.5
Conservative	Richard Hunt	14,456	35.4	+6.9
Liberal Democrats	Murli Sinha	5,880	14.4	+4.6
UKIP	Derek Bennett	3,449	8.4	+3.6
Christian	Gulzaman Khan	482	1.2	New
Independent	Mohammed Mulia	404	1.0	New
Majority		1,755	4.3	–18.2
Turnout		40,882	63.1	+3.1
Labour hold		Swing	–8.2	

=== Elections in the 2000s ===
General election 2005: Walsall South
Party	Candidate	Votes	%	±%
Labour	Bruce George	17,633	49.9	–9.1
Conservative	Kabir Sabar	9,687	27.4	–3.1
Liberal Democrats	Mohamed Asmal	3,240	9.2	+2.4
UKIP	Derek Bennett	1,833	5.2	+2.4
BNP	Kevin Smith	1,776	5.0	New
Respect	Nadia Fazal	1,146	3.2	New
Majority		7,946	22.5	–6.0
Turnout		35,315	58.5	+2.8
Labour hold		Swing	–3.0	

General election 2001: Walsall South
Party	Candidate	Votes	%	±%
Labour	Bruce George	20,574	59.0	+1.1
Conservative	Michael Bird	10,643	30.5	–1.2
Liberal Democrats	Bill Tomlinson	2,365	6.8	+0.6
UKIP	Derek Bennett	974	2.8	New
Socialist Alliance	Peter Smith	343	1.0	New
Majority		9,931	28.5	+2.3
Turnout		34,899	55.7	–11.6
Labour hold		Swing	+1.1	

=== Elections in the 1990s ===
General election 1997: Walsall South
Party	Candidate	Votes	%	±%
Labour	Bruce George	25,024	57.9	+9.7
Conservative	Leslie Leek	13,712	31.7	–10.2
Liberal Democrats	Harry Harris	2,698	6.2	–2.1
Referendum	Thomas Dent	1,662	3.8	New
Natural Law	Linda Meads	149	0.4	+0.1
Majority		11,312	26.2	+19.9
Turnout		43,245	67.3	–9.0
Labour hold		Swing	+10.0	

General election 1992: Walsall South
Party	Candidate	Votes	%	±%
Labour	Bruce George	24,133	48.2	+3.3
Conservative	LC Jones	20,955	41.9	–0.8
Liberal Democrats	GE Williams	4,132	8.3	–4.1
Green	RJ Clarke	673	1.3	New
Natural Law	JD Oldbury	167	0.3	New
Majority		3,178	6.3	+4.1
Turnout		50,060	76.3	+0.8
Labour hold		Swing	+2.1	

=== Elections in the 1980s ===
General election 1987: Walsall South
Party	Candidate	Votes	%	±%
Labour	Bruce George	22,629	44.9	+1.4
Conservative	Graham Postles	21,513	42.7	+0.6
Liberal	Lionel King	6,241	12.4	−0.8
Majority		1,116	2.2	+0.8
Turnout		50,383	75.5	+1.2
Labour hold		Swing	+1.0	

General election 1983: Walsall South
Party	Candidate	Votes	%	±%
Labour	Bruce George	21,735	43.5	−7.4
Conservative	David Nicholson	21,033	42.1	−5.2
Liberal	Bernard Silver	6,586	13.2	New
BNP	J Parker	632	1.3	New
Majority		702	1.4	−2.2
Turnout		49,986	74.3	−2.4
Labour hold		Swing	-1.1	

=== Elections in the 1970s ===
General election 1979: Walsall South
Party	Candidate	Votes	%	±%
Labour	Bruce George	22,539	50.9	+2.9
Conservative	A Hill	20,951	47.3	+10.0
National Front	V Parker	795	1.80	−1.0
Majority		1,588	3.6	−7.1
Turnout		44,285	76.7	+3.1
Labour hold		Swing		

General election October 1974: Walsall South
Party	Candidate	Votes	%	±%
Labour	Bruce George	20,917	48.0	+2.8
Conservative	H Smith	16,255	37.3	−4.4
Liberal	GFA Hooper	5,031	11.5	−1.6
National Front	JC Parker	1,226	2.8	New
More Prosperous Britain	Tom Keen	150	0.34	New
Majority		4,662	10.7	+7.2
Turnout		43,579	73.6	−4.7
Labour hold		Swing		

General election February 1974: Walsall South
Party	Candidate	Votes	%	±%
Labour	Bruce George	20,775	45.2	
Conservative	H Smith	19,195	41.7	
Liberal	Richard Hains	6,038	13.1	
Majority		1,580	3.5	N/A
Turnout		46,008	78.3	
Labour gain from Conservative		Swing		

General election 1970: Walsall South
Party	Candidate	Votes	%	±%
Conservative	Henry d'Avigdor-Goldsmid	35,545	59.5	+6.1
Labour	Graham S Rea	24,196	40.5	−6.1
Majority		11,349	19.0	+12.1
Turnout		59,741	73.0	−4.2
Conservative hold		Swing		

=== Elections in the 1960s ===
General election 1966: Walsall South
Party	Candidate	Votes	%	±%
Conservative	Henry d'Avigdor-Goldsmid	30,161	53.4	−3.7
Labour	R Geoffrey Drake	26,280	46.6	+3.7
Majority		3,881	6.9	−7.3
Turnout		56,441	77.2	−1.9
Conservative hold		Swing		

General election 1964: Walsall South
Party	Candidate	Votes	%	±%
Conservative	Henry d'Avigdor-Goldsmid	32,602	57.1	−1.3
Labour	Bryan Stanley	24,532	42.9	+1.3
Majority		8,070	14.2	−2.6
Turnout		57,314	79.1	−4.0
Conservative hold		Swing		

=== Elections in the 1950s ===
General election 1959: Walsall South
Party	Candidate	Votes	%	±%
Conservative	Henry d'Avigdor-Goldsmid	30,471	58.4	+5.7
Labour	John AF Ennals	21,689	41.6	−5.8
Majority		8,782	16.8	+11.5
Turnout		52,160	83.1	+2.9
Conservative hold		Swing		

General election 1955: Walsall South
Party	Candidate	Votes	%	±%
Conservative	Henry d'Avigdor-Goldsmid	24,077	52.7	
Labour	John Ennals	21,651	47.4	
Majority		2,426	5.3	
Turnout		45,728	80.2	
Conservative win (new seat)				

== See also ==
- List of parliamentary constituencies in the West Midlands (county)
