= Goldsmid family =

Anglo-Jewish banking family

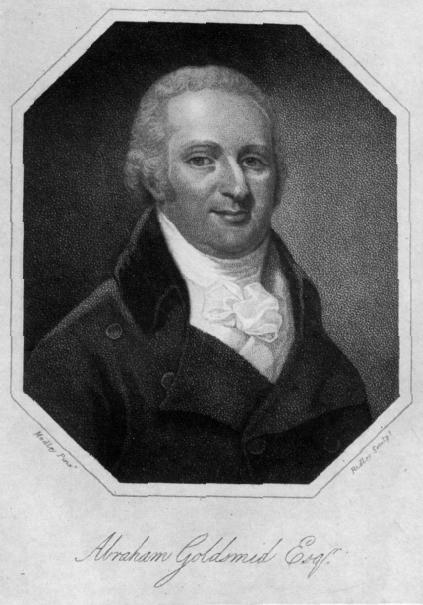
Abraham Goldsmid (c. 1756–1810)

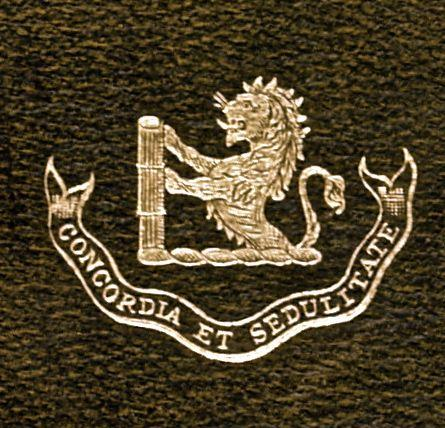
The Goldsmid family crest, with the motto Concordia et sedulitate

Goldsmid is the name of a family of Anglo-Jewish bankers who sprang from Aaron Goldsmid (died 1782), a Dutch merchant who settled in England around 1763. Two of his sons, Benjamin Goldsmid (c. 1753–1808) and Abraham Goldsmid (c. 1756–1810), began business together around 1777 as bill-brokers in London. They became great powers in the money market during the Napoleonic Wars through their dealings with the government. In 1810, Abraham Goldsmid was joint contractor with the Barings for a government loan, but owing to a depreciation of the scrip, he was forced into bankruptcy and committed suicide. His brother, in a fit of depression, had similarly taken his own life two years before. Both were noted for their public and private generosity, and both played major roles in funding and managing the Naval Asylum – later renamed the Royal Naval Asylum. Benjamin left four sons, the youngest being Lionel Prager Goldsmid, and a daughter Mary Ann Goldsmid who married Timothy Yeats Brown in 1812; Abraham left a daughter, Isabel Goldsmid.

Their nephew was Sir Isaac Goldsmid, 1st Baronet. He had married his cousin Isabel (the daughter of Abraham Goldsmid), and their second son was Sir Francis Goldsmid, 2nd Baronet (1808–1878). Francis became the first Jew to become an English barrister, and he went on to represent the Reading constituency. He also married his cousin – Louisa Goldsmid. They had no children, so Francis was succeeded in the baronetcy by his nephew Sir Julian Goldsmid, 3rd Baronet (1838–1896), son of Frederick David Goldsmid (1812–1866), MP for Honiton. Sir Julian was for many years in Parliament, and his wealth, ability and influence made him a person of considerable importance. He was eventually made a privy councillor. He had eight daughters, but no son, and his entailed property passed to his relation, Osmond Elim d'Avigdor; his house in Piccadilly was converted into the Isthmian Club.

Another distinguished member of the same family was Sir Frederic John Goldsmid (1818–1908), son of Lionel Prager Goldsmid. His sister married Henry Edward Goldsmid (1812–1855), an eminent Indian civil servant, son of Edward Goldsmid. His reform of the revenue system in Bombay and introduction of a new system, established after his death, through his reports in 1840–1847, and his devoted labor in land-surveys, were considered of the highest importance to western India and established his memory there as a public benefactor.

== Goldsmid baronets ==
- Sir Isaac Lyon Goldsmid, 1st Baronet (1778–1859)
- Sir Francis Henry Goldsmid, 2nd Baronet (1808–1878)
- Sir Julian Goldsmid, 3rd Baronet (1838–1896)

== See also ==
- Anna Maria Goldsmid
- Frederic John Goldsmid
- Louisa Sophia, Lady Goldsmid
- Henry d'Avigdor-Goldsmid
- James d'Avigdor-Goldsmid
- Jane Goldsmid
