= List of mayors of Chelsea =

This is a list of people who held the office of mayor of the Metropolitan Borough of Chelsea. The office was created in 1900 and abolished in 1965 when Chelsea became part of the larger Royal Borough of Kensington and Chelsea.

== List of mayors of Chelsea from 1900–1965 ==
- 1900–1901 Earl Cadogan
- 1901–1902 Major William Fountain Woods
- 1902–1903 Major William Fountain Woods (second term)
- 1903–1904 Major William Fountain Woods (third term)
- 1904–1905 James Jeffery
- 1905–1906 William John Mulvey
- 1906–1907 William Sidney
- 1907–1908 William Sidney (second term)
- 1908–1909 Rev. Henry Reginald Gamble
- 1909–1910 Christopher Head
- 1910–1911 Christopher Head (second term)
- 1911–1912 Frederick John Welch
- 1912–1913 Frederick John Welch (second term)
- 1913–1914 Frederick John Welch (third term)
- 1914–1915 Rev. Robert Hudson
- 1915–1916 Rev. Robert Hudson (second term)
- 1916–1917 Rev. Robert Hudson (third term)
- 1917–1918 Rev. Robert Hudson (fourth term)
- 1918–1919 Rev. Robert Hudson (fifth term)
- 1919–1920 Ernest Burrell Baggallay
- 1920–1921 John Ewer Jefferson Hogg
- 1921–1922 John Ewer Jefferson Hogg (second term)
- 1922–1923 John Ewer Jefferson Hogg (third term)
- 1923–1924 John Ewer Jefferson Hogg (fourth term)
- 1924–1925 Sir Albert Gray
- 1925–1926 Alfred Charles Seton Christopher
- 1926–1927 Charles Blackstone Clapcott
- 1927–1928 Charles Blackstone Clapcott (second term)
- 1928–1929 Charles Blackstone Clapcott (third term)
- 1929–1930 Lady Margaret Percy Phipps
- 1930–1931 Lady Margaret Percy Phipps (second term)
- 1931–1932 Lieutenant-Colonel Samuel Boyle
- 1932–1933 Lieutenant-Colonel Samuel Boyle (second term)
- 1933–1934 Lieutenant-Colonel Samuel Boyle (third term)
- 1934–1935 Lieutenant-Colonel Samuel Boyle (fourth term)
- 1935–1936 Lieutenant-Colonel Samuel Boyle (fifth term)
- 1936–1937 Lieutenant-Colonel Samuel Boyle (sixth term)
- 1937–1938 George Frederick Wilkins
- 1938–1939 George Frederick Wilkins (second term)
- 1939–1940 Lady Clare Isma Hartnell
- 1940–1941 Lady Clare Isma Hartnell (second term)
- 1941–1942 Robert Gillingham Wharam
- 1942–1943 Robert Gillingham Wharam (second term)
- 1943–1944 Robert Gillingham Wharam (third term)
- 1944–1945 Major Gerald Alfred Thesiger
- 1945–1946 Major Gerald Alfred Thesiger (second term)
- 1946–1947 Herbert Gwynne Evans
- 1947–1949 George Lane Tunbridge
- 1949–1950 George Lane Tunbridge (second term)
- 1950–1951 Captain Roderick Latimer Mackenzie Edwards RN
- 1951–1952 Captain Roderick Latimer Mackenzie Edwards RN (second term)
- 1952–1953 Mary K Cook
- 1953–1954 Mary K Cook (second term)
- 1954–1955 Guy Edmiston
- 1955–1956 Arthur J Sims - later first mayor of the Royal Borough of Kensington and Chelsea
- 1956–1957 Arthur J Sims (second term)
- 1957–1958 Basil Futvoye Marsden-Smedley
- 1958–1959 Basil Marsden-Smedley (second term)
- 1959–1960 Katharine Acland
- 1960–1961 Katharine Acland (second term)
- 1961–1962 John Stewart Tatton-Brown
- 1962–1963 Vice-Admiral John Walter Durnford
- 1963–1964 Lady Dorothy Mary Heath
- 1964–1965 Earl Cadogan (grandson of first mayor)
