= Ephraim Alex =

Businessman and philanthropist

- Born: 12 Dec 1800; Shoreditch, London
- Died: 13 November 1882 (aged 81–82); London

Ephraim Alex was an English Jewish philanthropist, founder of the Jewish Board of Guardians, London; born in Cheltenham, 1800; died in London, 13 November 1882. He was a successful business man, which eminently helped him achieve great charitable work, to which he chiefly devoted his attention. He established the Jewish Board of Guardians in London in 1859. Ephraim Alex imparted his zeal and public spirit to the community, which rapidly developed and perfected the organisation. A suggestion had indeed been made as early as 1802 by Joshua Van Oven to replace the loose and imperfect arrangement between the three German synagogues by a definite Board of Guardians for the Jewish poor. This suggestion was, however, lost sight of until 1858, when Alex was overseer of the Great Synagogue. He became impressed that the inadequate system for outdoor charity begun to prevail. He ventilated the subject energetically before his own council and vestry as well as on various public occasions.

In February 1859 he issued a circular proposing "a scheme for a Board of Guardians for the relief of the necessitous foreign poor." This scheme exhibited a great insight into the needs of the poor, as well as a comprehensive idea of the machinery necessary to relieve them. The keynote of the circular and scheme was organization, and the subsequent development of the board had been strictly on the lines of Alex's original conception.

He was not a man of commanding intellect, but he possessed a genial and tactful disposition which attracted young men to undertake. He was the first president of the board, over which he continued to preside until 1869, when his physical infirmities compelled his retirement; as a member of the board, however, he continued to take part in its deliberations until the year of his death. He was also a life-member of the Council of the United Synagogue, and a member of the Committee of the Jews' Hospital in Mile End.
