= Francis Goldsmid =

English lawyer and politician

Sir Francis Goldsmid, Bt
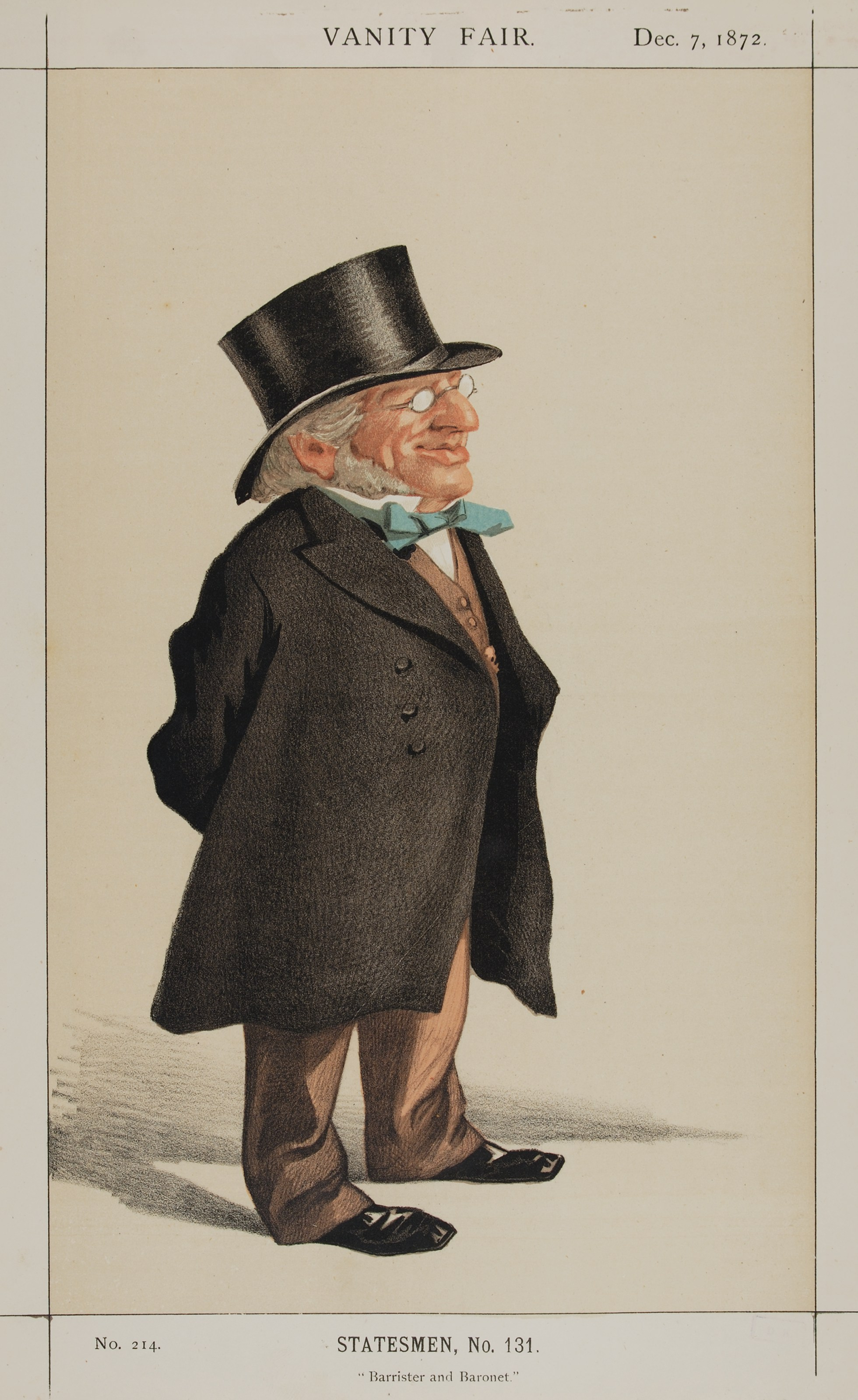
- "Barrister and Baronet"; Goldsmid as caricatured by James Tissot in Vanity Fair, December 1872
- Born: 1 May 1808
- Died: 2 May 1878 (aged 70)
- Occupation(s): Barrister, politician
- Spouse: Louisa Sophia Goldsmid (m. 1839)
- Parent: Sir Isaac Lyon Goldsmid
- Relatives: Frederick Goldsmid (brother); Sir Julian Goldsmid (nephew)

Sir Francis Henry Goldsmid, 2nd Baronet (1 May 1808 – 2 May 1878) was an English lawyer and politician.

== Early life ==
The son of Sir Isaac Lyon Goldsmid and a member of the Goldsmid banking family, Francis was born in London, and privately educated.

== Career ==
Goldsmid was called to the bar at Lincoln's Inn in 1833, becoming the first Jew to become an English barrister, and was made Queen's Counsel in 1858. In 1859 he succeeded to his father's honors. After the passing of the Jewish Disabilities Bill, in which he had aided his father with a number of pamphlets that attracted great attention, he entered Parliament in 1860 as member for the Reading constituency, and represented that constituency until his death.

Goldsmid was strenuous on behalf of the Jewish religion, and the founder of the great Jews Free School. He was a munificent contributor to charities and especially to the endowment of University College London. He married Louisa Goldsmid who was his cousin. His wife was a campaigner for women's education. He employed the author and translator Frederica Maclean Rowan as his secretary for some years.

== Marriage ==
He married his first cousin Louisa Sophia Goldsmid on 10 October 1839 at London, England. His nephew was Sir Julian Goldsmid.

== Death and legacy ==
Sir Francis Henry Goldsmid 2nd Bt., died dsp on 2 May 1878 in St. Thomas's Hospital London following an accident that day when he fell between the platform and a carriage from which he was alighting at Waterloo Station. He was succeeded in the baronetcy by his nephew Sir Julian Goldsmid, son of Frederick Goldsmid. Goldsmid Road in the town of Reading is named after Francis Goldsmid, and is the location of the town's Orthodox synagogue.

Parliament of the United Kingdom
Preceded by Francis Piggott; Sir Henry Singer Keating	Member of Parliament for Reading; 1860 – 1878; With: Francis Piggott to Nov 1860; Gillery Piggott Nov 1860–1863; George Shaw-Lefevre from 1863	Succeeded by George Shaw-Lefevre; George Palmer
Baronetage of the United Kingdom
Preceded by Isaac Lyon Goldsmid	Baronet (of St John's Lodge); 1859–1878	Succeeded by Julian Goldsmid
