= Jewish Board of Guardians (United Kingdom) =

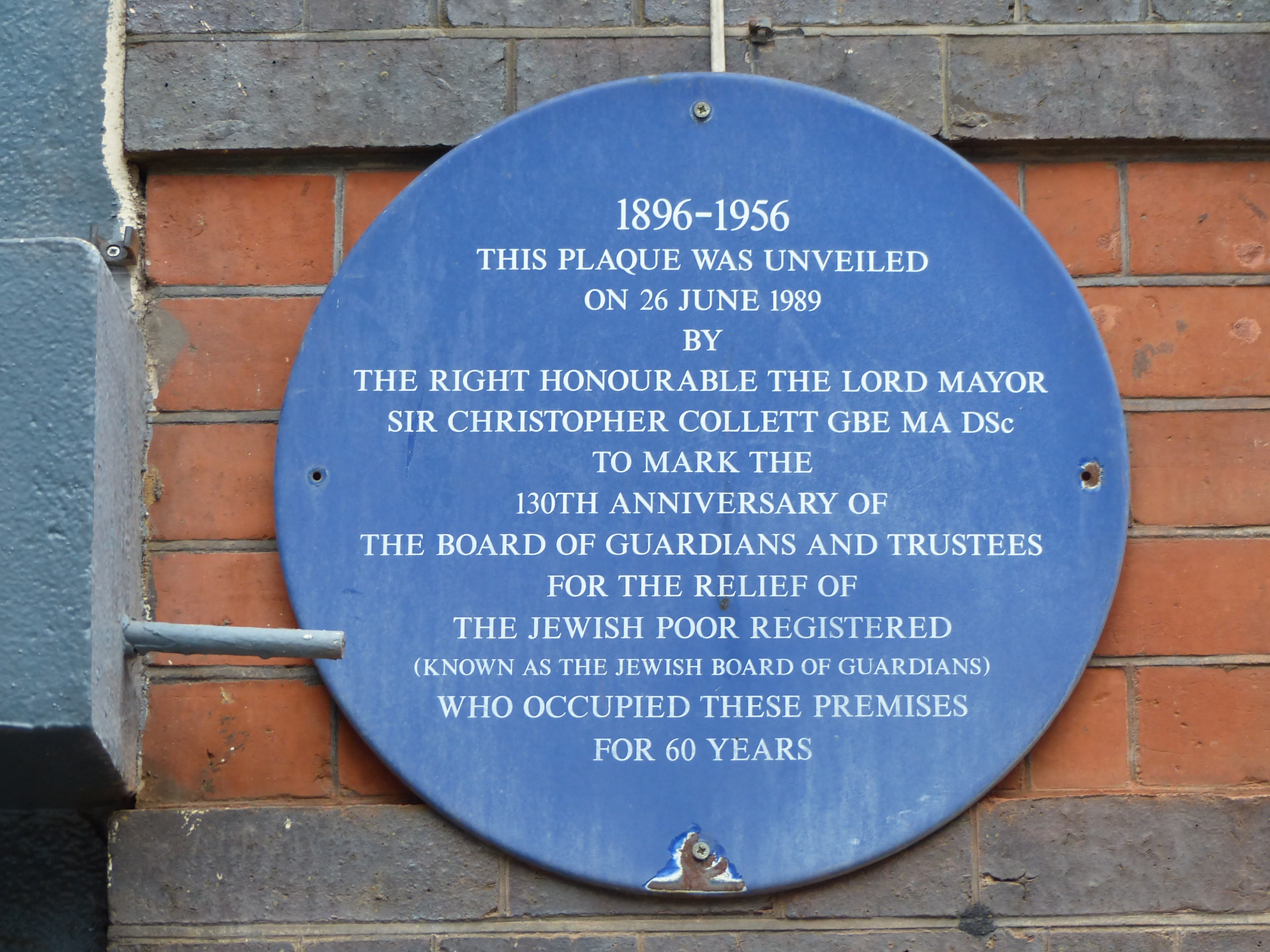

The Board of Guardians for the Relief of the Jewish Poor, or as it is most generally known, the Jewish Board of Guardians, was a charity established by the upper class Jewish community in the East End of London in 1859. The board sought to provide relief for Jewish immigrants and soon became the central provider of relief for the Jewish poor in London.

After an amalgamation with other charities in the 1990s, the Jewish Board of Guardians became Jewish Care, an organization that still exists today.

== Early history and foundation ==
The Jewish Board of Guardians was a charity established in the East End of London by members of the Jewish community in 1859.The situation of the Jewish poor in London was increasingly problematic by the late 19th century. Christian missionaries and conversionists targeted the Jewish poor, which became a concern for their co-religionists. Members of the Jewish community deemed existing methods of relief for the Jewish poor in London as insufficient. The Board of Guardians was established to consolidate and effectively provide relief where other charities had failed. The Board of Guardians was established because of the introduction of the Poor Law Amendment Act 1834 amendments by secular authorities. These laws applied a workhouse test to qualify for poor relief; the workhouse was unsuitable for the Jewish community because of their special religious constraints and requirements. The three main Ashkenazi synagogues of London thus established the Board of Guardians. These were the Great Synagogue, the Hambro' Synagogue, and the New Synagogue. These establishments voted in 1858 to establish a conjoint committee to tackle the issue of the Jewish poor. The first meeting of the Jewish Board of Guardians was held at the Great Synagogue chambers on 16 March 1859. The board was initially led by Ephraim Alex, overseer of the poor for the Great Synagogue, who secured a grant of less than £500 from the three synagogues to assess the Jewish poor in London. The seventeen members who founded the Board were delegates of the Ashkenazi synagogues.They included financiers, businessmen and professionals. Lionel Louis Cohen was the honorary secretary of the board until he succeeded Alex and became president of the Board in 1869. Baron Ferdinand de Rothschild began terms as Treasurer in 1868 and 1875. The headquarters were initially an extension on the Jewish Soup Kitchen, but later moved to Middlesex Street. On its foundation the board stated that:

"the teachings of religion, the impulses of humanity and the doctrines of social sciences alike concur in recommending and consecrating an enlarged and expansive charity, and in distinguishing it from mere alms-giving".

The board later became concerned with the poor from the Netherlands, Germany, and increasingly Eastern Europe.

In their 29th annual report, the board stated that:

"Organization such as possessed by the board is necessary from an economic point of view, so as to practically eradicate the great problem of relief in a manner which will do the largest amount of good with the means at disposal; and the fact must not be ignored that a larger expenditure is not a sure indication of an increase in pauperperism and nursing but may reflect a removal of poverty by a prompt wrestling with discovered suffering through the bestowal of an adequate and measured assistance."

== Work ==
=== Initial aims ===
The Board of Guardians was established to help the Jewish poor in London. The board aimed to create a system that would assist the community without creating a class dependent on charity. As historian Eugene C. Black states, "the board strove to avoid any form of aid that might pauperise the recipient or create passive dependency".

Unlike other Victorian charities the Board could not rely on the workhouse and had to create useful and novel practices to help their own community. The Board aimed to provide relief that would help others in the long term. "From the outset the Board found it hard to meet the needs of the ever-increasing poor Jewish community". The board relied on donations from eminent Jewish families to fund their charitable work. However, the needs of the community soon expanded far past the resources available. As Laurie Magnus states in the volume to commemorate the first fifty years of the board, "from the very onset of its work the board found it difficult to maintain this equilibrium. They community required its services. And this fact, proved somewhat embarrassing when the fresh duties were thrust upon the board without the corresponding resources".

=== Eligibility for relief ===
The board was particular about to whom charitable relief was provided. There was no relief without inquiry. Visiting officers made the appropriate checks to ensure that the Board's limited resources were not wasted. This meant they visited every applicant. Black similarly states that "Home visits went hand in hand with relief and the Board reinvestigated any case lasting over six months".

The relief provided by the board was also not available to new immigrants until after a six-month initial period. This allowed the Board to advertise in continental papers against migration to England in hope of receiving aid. In using this method, the Board of Guardians hoped to stem the tide of foreign migration. By 1896 the investigation of cases was assigned to an official committee, which brought legal action against those they deemed unworthy or misusing the Board's charity.

=== Applicants for relief ===
The application of relief from the Jewish Board of Guardians was from those, especially within the Jewish community who were in great need. The scope of people who applied for relief from the board was expansive but included groups such as: widows, children, orphans, asylum seekers and people seeking medical or financial aid.

The 1905 Annual Report of the board shows that the highest group of people receiving temporary relief was those with illnesses and the lowest being those with husbands in prison. Deserted wives received little help. The board tried to help those they considered to be most in need, more so than deserted wives. However, because of a lack of alternative systems of relief the board decided they had to help them.

The Board not only attempted to identify those who should be helped by categorisation such as orphans and widows, they also attempted to do it through government categorisation of the deserving and undeserving poor. "The deserving were those in need who are unable to work because they are too old, disabled, or too sick." Hqwever, ‘the undeserving were people who did not want to work but could, these were the people the Board tried to avoid helping.' Furthermore, the number of applicants fluctuated, with "the number of poor immigrants including wives and children ranging annually from about 250–1,000 varying on the condition in other countries." "The Board focused on the welfare of the children as they were the future and would also prevent further generations of Jewish poor". As seen above, the main group of applicants were immigrants, said to be escaping persecution. Lipman emphasises this majority by stating that, "native born applicants, from 1800-1900 were only 10% of all applicants."

Although, this is not the figures of applicants that have recently arrived in the country, as "earlier immigrants had become absorbed in the resident population and had become reliant on the Board for relief." From 1889 to 1914, the Jewish Board of Guardians was the primary organization that dealt with the foreign poor in a narrow area of the East End which suffered from a great deal of overcrowding.

== Controlling the immigration of the Jewish poor ==
Although the board had been providing relief to the Jewish poor since 1859, it was not used to dealing with the vast numbers of Jews that began to settle in London, resulting in a number of issues. These issues included problems of overcrowding which caused increases in rent and poor living conditions. Bad living conditions and appalling sanitation resulted in the spread of illness and disease, meaning medical relief was limited. There was also higher competition for jobs and widespread unemployment. The board were concerned with the number of Jews potentially arriving to seek relief temporarily instead of aiming for long-term self-improvement.

Therefore, a six-month rule was devised, which was primarily a probation period for the Jewish immigrants. Relief was not given unless Jews had been in the country for at least six months. This rule was proposed by Ephraim Alex, the first president of the board (1859–69), in, A Scheme for a Board of Guardians, to be formed for the relief of the necessitous foreign poor. However, relief was distributed to the new immigrants in cases of emergency. In the 1880s it became apparent that the elite would be faced with an influx on immigration as immigrants left Eastern Europe either to start a new life in England, or to use England as a temporary stopping point as they aspired to reach America. The board initiated several methods to control immigration, as it became transparently impossible to limit it, such as transmigration, dispersion and repatriation. Jews were either emigrated on to countries such as America, Canada and Australia or repatriated back. From 1881 to 1914, the board helped 17,087 people to settle in London, however, it managed to reduce overcrowding by emigrating 8,152 and repatriating 7,574 people. Nathan S. Joseph, chairman of the Executive of the Conjoint Committee of the Russo-Jewish Committee and Board of Guardians 1893–1909, to differentiate the ‘industrial fitness’ of the Jewish immigrants. The classification was as follows: "firstly, skilled artisans, who were vigorous, robust and healthy, secondly, those fit to transmigrate and thirdly, the poor and weak, the adventurer and mendicant." Generally, those who were put into the first category, mainly being young, fit and healthy were offered help to transmigrate. More immigrants, however were repatriated as it was the most cost efficient option. Historian Vivian D. Lipman, argued that it is Jewish tradition "to give applicants enough to get them on to the next town and the next overseer."

== Systems of relief ==
=== Loans ===
The board provided relief through the use of loans.

"Money was almost never used and the Board considered cash relief an ultimate last resort."

The board established a loans committee that oversaw the distributions by the charity.

"In its first 17 years the Board provided 1767 loans totaling £226322".

Despite their wish to keep them low, loans given by the board did increase. One of the initial reliefs given by the board was the loaning of sewing machines.

"These machines were lent to deserving borrowers, who paid for them in installments."

The board used the money gained from this to buy more machines and repeat the process.

"By 1864 they had managed to by 26 machines."

This system of relief was later taken over by Messrs Singer themselves.

"In 1866 the loans committee became a department in itself, under the supervisions of David Benjamin, a benefactor of the committee."

Under this new system the loans could be organized and controlled more closely. It also allowed the more respectable classes to apply for relief in private separately to the wider public. The security of the loans committee created a confidence, which encouraged donations. The provisions attached to the loans also meant they were not misused.

"In 1887 the capital of the loans committee was increased and donations such as the 3,000,000 francs by Baronesse de Hirsch allowed the committee to expand."

By 1907 it had an annual turnover of £13,000.

==== Education, apprenticeships and employment ====
The Jewish Board of Guardians main aim was to create a self-supporting class. They focused on education and apprenticing the future generations to stop them becoming impoverished.

"The work committee acted in conjunction with the loans committee and became the industrial committee in 1872."

The board aimed to provide apprenticeships for boys and girls.

Laurie Magnus states that:

"Following the loans of sewing machines the industrial committee used this money to accomplish 2 main purposes:

1. Loan of tools and implements to carpenters, cabinet makers, show-makers, printers, book-binders and other mechanics on the same basis as the on which the loans of sewing-machines to tailors and umbrella makers had hitherto conducted.
2. Giving security for tailors and mechanics to enable them to obtain work from warehouses and workshops."

In 1896 Helen Lucas became the president of the JBG workrooms where girls would be taught how to embroider and other types of needlework so that they would become employable.

"In 1903 a ladies sub-committee was enacted which focused on the apprenticeship of girls".

The board considered education one of its main aims, to create an educated class and to keep skilled workers in long-term employment.

Jewish Board of Guardians apprenticeships
Year	No. of applicants	Programme cost (£)
1863	1	10
1873	85	1,319
1888	103	1,461
1893	131	2,107
1898	230	3,001
1903	236	2,945
1908	371	3,239

==== Emigration, transmigration and repatriation ====
The board experienced the issues surrounding an increase Jewish immigrants and refugees coming to London. The board vowed to help this class of the strange poor which mainly came from Europe.

"In 1881 the problem of immigration was increased by the influx of immigrants seeking refuge from the pogroms of Russia...The Board of Guardians created a joint committee with the Mansion House Fund to tackle this issue." "By 1885 the problem had further increased and the Board set up temporary shelters."

The Board of Guardians also encouraged repatriation and transmigration. They sent many migrants back to their countries of origin, as well as on to other countries, especially the United States.

"The Board denied welfare to those who had been in the country less than six months".

The Jewish Board of Guardians did not want the new immigrants to become burdens on the preexisting community. Eugene C. Black states:

"Those who could not adapt and were poor prospects for emigration, Board leaders argued, should not remain burdens on the community".

Those who came to England could not necessarily be transmigrated by the board on to countries such as the United States.

"In 1886 authorities in New York denied entry to those who could not show they had the means of supporting themselves nor a benefactor to rely on."

They faced similar problems in Hamburg and the board could not support these migrants. The board paid for immigrates travel to Hamburg and on to other countries if they failed to find employment in England. In September 1886, the Hamburg authorities stopped this policy. This thus increased the number staying in England and increased the board's work.

Impact of aliens on Jewish Board of Guardians relief funds
Year	Cases	No. of individuals	% of Russian aliens who are residents in the UK for 7+ years	% of Russian aliens who are residents in the UK 7 years	Total
1894	5,157	32,510	40.8	35.7	76.5
1895	4,794	34,418	41.2	36.5	77.7
1896	4,366	35,063	27.9	47.4	75.3
1897	4,286	33,380	30.0	49.3	79.3

Jewish Board of Guardians repatriation and emigration, 1894–7
	1894	1895	1896	1897
Repatriation
Men	490	335	460	533
Women	108	80	61	74
Children	261	111	131	158
Emigration
Men	79	88	87	109
Dependent wives	13	35	29	36
Children	36	72	34	64
Widows	3	6	1	6
Children of widows	5	4	2	13
Single women	10	8	7	9
Deserted women	61	79	93	98
Children of deserted women	113	172	207	194
Orphans of deserted women	0	0	6	6
Destination of emigrants
United States	127	145	149	176
South Africa	16	27	38	21
Australia	12	9	3	17

==== Health, sanitation and social care ====
The living conditions of the Jewish community were of paramount importance for the board. Laurie Magnus states that:

"The Board believed that the central problem of relief lay in the homes of the poor".

The dwelling of the East End population was considered to be inadequate and central to the problem of poverty. Magnus continued...

"The Board established Medical and Sanitary committees to tackle this problem. The medical Board was given medical officers and £293 and 18s to solve this issue...The issues faced by the Board included insufficient food and clothing, a neglect of proper standards of cleanliness, bad ventilation, overcrowded dwellings and deficient light...The visiting committee, which was established in 1862, dealt with housing".

Furthermore, they looked at the conditions of the Jewish quarters and reported their findings to the Jewish Board of Guardians.

"The medical Board provided nursing until 1906."

"The prescriptions distributed by the Board were fulfilled by the Metropolitan Free Hospital...By 1871 visits and applications for medical relief reached 41,000...By 1873 the medical committee was completely reorganized to stop a misuse of funds...The Board later disbanded the medical committee in favour of state organized relief. To ensure sanitary efficiency, as well as clean homes and water supplies, the Board established a sanitary committee. The Sanitary Committee visited 2,317 cases and visited 132 workshops"

This committee was remodelled and became the Health Committee.

== Partnerships ==
The Russo-Jewish Committee was established in 1882 to oversee all matters of Jewish immigrants. The Conjoint Committee an amalgamation of the Russo-Jewish Committee and the Jewish Board of Guardians, aimed to tackle all matters of immigration. This committee collaborated with the Board (between 1893 and 1909) and became the primary source of aid to the Jewish poor. "The Conjoint Committee was the lineal descendent of the Mansion House Committee " Despite the fact that the two organizations were a partnership, the Board of Guardians continued to dominate the majority of decisions. Sir Julian Goldsmid, chairman of the Russo-Jewish Committee, cooperated with Benjamin Cohen, who was the president of the Jewish Board of Guardians at this time. Any disagreements between the two leaders were settled by the interests of the elite as a whole. As a result of the six month rule, other charities developed in order to aid the immigrants."In the process of adjustment those immigrants were helped by relatives, kinsmen, landsleit, and alternative smaller and more flexible institutions, such as Hevras" Hevras, a charity also established in the East End, offered help for immigrants to overcome the distress’ caused by the immigration process. This charity was less hierarchical and more democratic than the Board. For many, Hevras represented traditional Jewish morals within the charities policies. Many immigrants turned to Hevras because of the Board of Guardians restrictive policies, such as the six-month rule.

== Public opinion and the Aliens Act ==
Public opinion of the Jewish poor in London is hugely significant in understanding why the board was created, and in part, what the board sought to achieve. Bad public opinion regarding foreign poor was due to the massive influx of immigration effecting London's resources and the commonly held myth of "the Dirty Jew being reinforced by the foreign poor." Even Alfred Cohen a brother of Leonard Cohen, who was a board member, regarded alien Jews as "dirty squalid and unpleasant." "The foreign poor were accused of causing overcrowding, increases in rents and demands for premiums."

The Aliens Act 1905 was the "first piece of immigration legislation in 20th century Britain" and the first "to define some groups of migrants as undesirable."

It is said that, "The Act ensured that leave to land could be withheld if the immigrant was judged to be undesirable by falling into one of four categories: a) if he cannot show that he has in his possession ... the means of decently supporting himself and his dependents ...; 'b) if he is a lunatic or an idiot or owing to any disease of infirmity liable to become a charge upon the public rates ...; c) 'if he has been sentenced in a foreign country for a crime, not being an offence of a political character ...; or d) if an expulsion order under this act has (already) been made."

The above statement can be seen to relate to the board's own category of defining applicants as deserving or undeserving but also represents the stereotypes immigrants may receive from the outburst of negative public opinion. "The Board members were of a higher social stance than the Jewish immigrants and poor they were helping." They used their upper-class status to gain funds from friends and colleagues which allowed the board to function as well as it did. Rozin supported this by stating that the "Cohens were supported morally and financially by the wealthy class as a whole." Furthermore, the work of the board, therefore, may have been more for preservation of the existing Jewish community and identity in as far as it sought to help the poor altruistically.

== The board in the 20th century ==
The work of the Board of Guardians diminished in the 20th century. The medical committee had been disbanded in favour of relief provided by the official state authorities, and later more committees reduced their work in favour of state funded welfare. The board had been at the forefront of innovation, but a lack of change meant it began less prevalent. Eugene C. Black argues that:

"for its first thirty years the Board had been in the forefront of innovation in social work, for the next thirty, it fell further and further behind."

"The Board slowly adapted its administrative attitudes, arrangements and commitments."

"The liberal government increased social welfare legislation in 1905, and further increased it after the December 1910 election".

The introduction of old age pensions in 1908, national insurance in 1911 affected the board's work. The Aliens Act 1905 similarly worked in the board's favour by decreasing the number of immigrants allowed to enter Britain.

"However, some of these reforms were not fully applicable, especially of many of the Board's recipients were not British citizens and therefore could not qualify."

By 1920 a broader scope of unemployment laws meant that they began to help the Jewish community.

"Much of the Board's work shifted to the public sphere, with most relief being provided by the state apparatus."

In the 1990s the Jewish Board of Guardians merged with other Jewish charities to become Jewish Care, an organization that still exists today.

== Criticisms of the board ==
Despite the board being a charity, they did receive criticisms from ex-members and the general public. Some of the main criticisms of the Jewish Board of Guardians come from those within the Jewish community itself. The general organization of the Board was criticized, with some claiming:

"the private donor was uninformed and misdirected, so often gave to the wrong people, the wrong amount and in the wrong way."

Lipman went as far as to state that:

"there was no attempt at budgetary control."

However, despite the need to be critical of how the Board could have improved efficiency, it cannot be ignored that the reasons for these mistakes were the board trying to deal with an increasing number of cases. This meant that:

"the time staff could spend on one case and money they had to give was decreased."

The process of checking if an applicant was worthy for relief was also analyzed. People:

"criticized the Board for a lack of sympathy in the administration of relief, claiming the applicants were interviewed standing up behind a brass rail."

The board was also accused of losing sight of the applicant's real needs and failing to provide constructive help in the early 20th century.

However, the main criticism the board faced was regarding emigration and repatriation. Many felt that the board's great work encouraged people who were not suffering persecution to come to England purely for a better standard of living, giving the impression that the board were encouraging immigration. However, the board's way of dealing with this has also been highly criticized. They created the six-month rule to refuse relief to those that had been in the country less than six months. But this rule:

"... meant the new immigrants in the greatest distress were denied relief...However this was counteracted by the fact that discretionary power relieved those in need despite the amount of time they were in the country for... Repatriation as a whole was criticized. As many believed it was "endangering the lives of the repatriates as took them back into discrimination and awful conditions."

However, in 1905 after the Pogrom the board stopped repatriation completely but was persuaded to bring it back due to a mass of requests from applicants.

"The Board was also generally under scrutiny from other organizations. The American-Jewish establishment suggested that the Board were not making as much effort as they could."

Additionally, old board members such as Asher I. Myers published:

... "sustained criticism in the Jewish Chronicle."

Nevertheless, this was an organization experiencing increasing pressure on their resources and relying almost entirely on donations. The board was also:

"... always hampered by the fact that if they developed their services too far they might be encouraging immigrants."
