= Frederick Goldsmid =

English politician

Frederick David Goldsmid (31 January 1812 – 18 March 1866), son of Sir Isaac Lyon Goldsmid and his wife Isabel, was an English politician.

He was elected a Member of Parliament (MP) for Honiton on 12 July 1865.

Goldsmid married, on 23 July 1834, Caroline Samuel (1814–1885), daughter of Phillip Moses Samuel and Julia Goldsmid.Their first child was Helen (later Lucas) who was born in the next year. They would have eight more children. Frederick taught Helen Hebrew when she was a child. She would be a philanthropist after she became a rich widow.

He died on 18 March 1866. He and his wife, who died in 1885, are both buried at Balls Pond Road Cemetery.
