= Lichfield and Tamworth =

Parliamentary constituency in the United Kingdom, 1950–1983

- Former county constituency for the House of Commons

1950–1983
- Seats: one
- Created from: Lichfield
- Replaced by: Staffordshire South East, Mid Staffordshire and Cannock & Burntwood

Lichfield and Tamworth was a parliamentary constituency centred on the towns of Lichfield and Tamworth in Staffordshire. It returned one Member of Parliament (MP) to the House of Commons of the Parliament of the United Kingdom, elected by the first past the post system.

== History ==
The constituency was created for the 1950 general election, and abolished for the 1983 general election, when it was partly replaced by the new Mid Staffordshire constituency.

== Boundaries ==
1950–1955: The Boroughs of Lichfield and Tamworth, the Urban Districts of Aldridge and Rugeley, and the Rural District of Lichfield.

1955–1974: The Boroughs of Lichfield and Tamworth, the Urban District of Rugeley, and the Rural District of Lichfield.

1974–1983: The Boroughs of Lichfield and Tamworth, and the Rural District of Lichfield except the parish of Brindley Heath.

== Members of Parliament ==
Election	Member	Party
1950	Julian Snow	Labour
1970	Jack d'Avigdor-Goldsmid	Conservative
Oct 1974	Bruce Grocott	Labour
1979	John Heddle	Conservative
1983	constituency abolished	

== Elections ==
=== Elections in the 1950s ===
General election 1950: Lichfield and Tamworth
Party	Candidate	Votes	%	±%
Labour	Julian Snow	29,199	54.2	
Conservative	Sarah Ward	24,681	45.8	
Majority		4,518	8.4	
Turnout		53,880	86.3	
Labour win (new seat)				

General election 1951: Lichfield and Tamworth
Party	Candidate	Votes	%	±%
Labour	Julian Snow	28,826	52.6	−1.6
Conservative	George Hampson	25,941	47.4	+1.6
Majority		2,885	5.2	−3.2
Turnout		54,767	85.5	−0.8
Labour hold		Swing		

General election 1955: Lichfield and Tamworth
Party	Candidate	Votes	%	±%
Labour	Julian Snow	21,071	54.0	+1.4
Conservative	Jonathan Oliver Tollemache Blow	17,966	46.0	−1.4
Majority		3,105	8.0	+2.8
Turnout		39,037	80.9	−4.6
Labour hold		Swing		

General election 1959: Lichfield and Tamworth
Party	Candidate	Votes	%	±%
Labour	Julian Snow	21,341	51.9	−2.1
Conservative	Francis Roberts	19,791	48.1	+2.1
Majority		1,550	3.8	−4.2
Turnout		41,132	81.9	+1.0
Labour hold		Swing		

=== Elections in the 1960s ===
General election 1964: Lichfield and Tamworth
Party	Candidate	Votes	%	±%
Labour	Julian Snow	22,644	48.5	−3.4
Conservative	Kenneth Dunkley	18,828	40.3	−7.8
Liberal	Anthony Extance	5,206	11.2	New
Majority		3,816	8.2	+4.4
Turnout		46,678	80.9	−1.0
Labour hold		Swing		

General election 1966: Lichfield and Tamworth
Party	Candidate	Votes	%	±%
Labour	Julian Snow	27,971	54.0	+5.5
Conservative	Bruce A Webb	23,837	46.0	+5.7
Majority		4,134	8.0	−0.2
Turnout		51,808	78.8	−2.1
Labour hold		Swing		

=== Elections in the 1970s ===
General election 1970: Lichfield and Tamworth
Party	Candidate	Votes	%	±%
Conservative	James d'Avigdor-Goldsmid	31,274	51.6	+5.6
Labour	Terry Pitt	29,298	48.4	−5.6
Majority		1,976	3.2	N/A
Turnout		60,572	74.2	−4.6
Conservative gain from Labour		Swing		

General election February 1974: Lichfield and Tamworth
Party	Candidate	Votes	%	±%
Conservative	James d'Avigdor-Goldsmid	30,659	41.6	−10.0
Labour	Bruce Grocott	28,852	39.2	−9.2
Liberal	Doreen Elliott	14,151	19.2	New
Majority		1,807	2.4	−0.8
Turnout		73,662	82.8	+8.6
Conservative hold		Swing		

General election October 1974: Lichfield and Tamworth
Party	Candidate	Votes	%	±%
Labour	Bruce Grocott	29,872	42.6	+3.4
Conservative	James d'Avigdor-Goldsmid	29,541	42.1	+0.5
Liberal	Philip Rule	10,741	15.3	−4.9
Majority		331	0.5	N/A
Turnout		70,154	78.2	−4.6
Labour gain from Conservative		Swing		

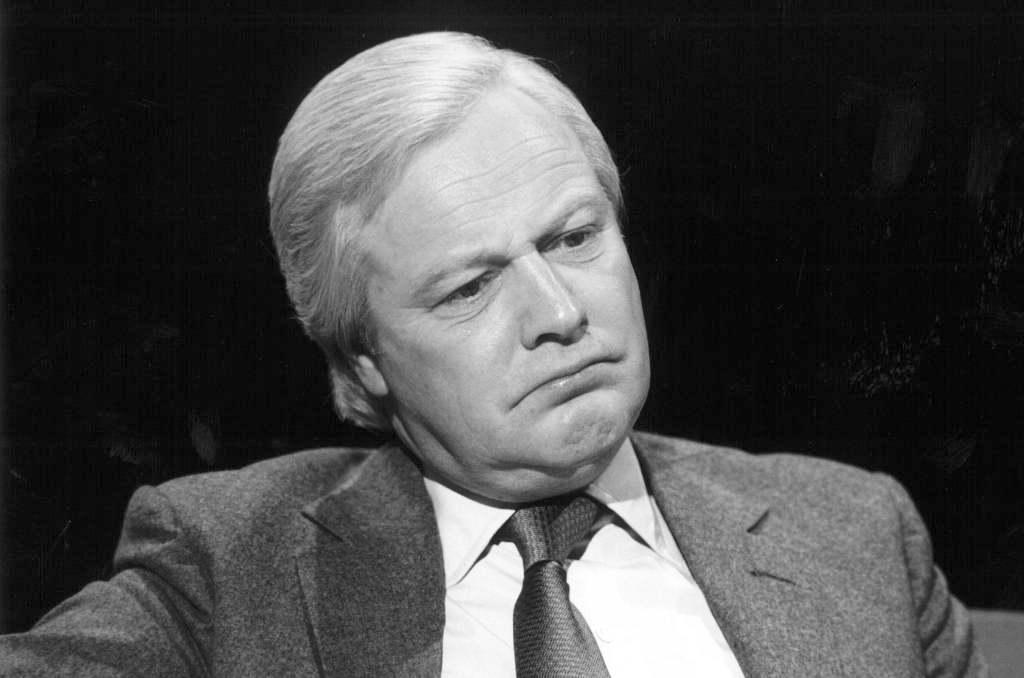
Heddle

General election 1979: Lichfield and Tamworth
Party	Candidate	Votes	%	±%
Conservative	John Heddle	41,454	50.3	+8.2
Labour	Bruce Grocott	33,006	40.1	−2.5
Liberal	Philip Rule	7,408	9.0	−6.3
National Front	P Wallace	475	0.6	New
Majority		8,448	10.2	N/A
Turnout		82,343	81.2	+3.0
Conservative gain from Labour		Swing		
