= Osmond d'Avigdor-Goldsmid =

British financier and baronet

Sir Osmond Elim d'Avigdor-Goldsmid, 1st Baronet DL JP (9 August 1877 – 14 April 1940) was a British financier and baronet.

== Life ==
D'Avigdor-Goldsmid was born to Jewish parents. His father, Elim Henry d'Avigdor, was a noted civil engineer. He was educated at Harrow School and Trinity Hall, Cambridge.

=== First World War ===
D'Avigdor-Goldsmid served in the France during the First World War (1914–19). He reached the rank of Lieutenant Colonel and was twice mentioned in dispatches.

=== Public life ===
He served as High Sheriff of Kent in 1912, Chairman of the Jewish Colonisation Association (1919), President of the Anglo-Jewish Association (1921–26), President of the British Board of Deputies of British Jews (1926–33), and Treasurer of the Jewish Memorial Council.

=== Baronetcy ===
Born Osmond d'Avigdor, he "added the name Goldsmid on inheriting the estates of his cousin Sir Julian Goldsmid". He was created a Baronet of Somerhill in the County of Kent on 22 January 1934.

=== Personal life ===
In 1907, D'Avigdor-Goldsmid married Alice Landau(1881—1968), Russian banker Yakov Polyakov's granddaughter. After his death, his son Henry D'Avigdor-Goldsmid inherited his peerage.

He was a member of the Athenæum.

== Memorial ==
The Israeli settlement of Avigdor was named after him.

Baronetage of the United Kingdom
New creation	Baronet (of Somerhill); 1934–1940	Succeeded by Henry D'Avigdor-Goldsmid
