= Isaac Goldsmid =

British financier (1778–1859)

- Baronet
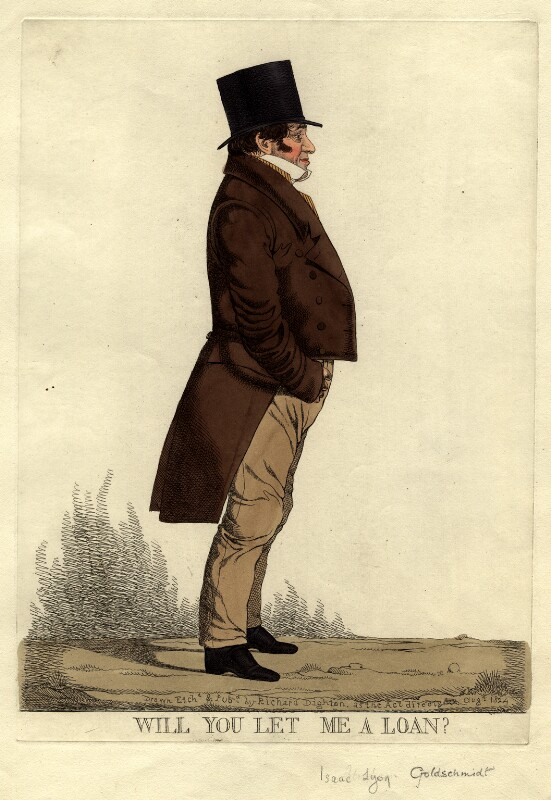
- Tenure: 1841–1859
- Known for: Financier and one of the leading figures in the Jewish emancipation in the United Kingdom
- Born: 13 January 1778; London
- Died: 27 April 1859 (aged 81)
- Spouse: Isabel
- Issue: 2

Sir Isaac Lyon Goldsmid, 1st Baronet (13 January 1778 – 27 April 1859) was a financier and one of the leading figures in the Jewish emancipation in the United Kingdom, who became the first British Jew to receive a hereditary title.

== Biography ==
=== Birth ===
Isaac Goldsmid was born in London on 13 January 1778.

=== Career ===
He began in business with a firm of bullion brokers, Mocatta & Goldsmid (estab. 1684), to the Bank of England and the East India Company. He became a partner in Mocatta & Goldsmid and amassed a large fortune.

Moreover, he assisted by his capital and his enterprise to build some of the railways in southern England and also the London docks.

In 1820 he became a Member of the Royal Astronomical Society, then called the Astronomical Society of London.

=== Philanthropy ===
He is chiefly known for his efforts to obtain the emancipation of the Jews in England and for his part in founding University College London. The Jewish Disabilities Bill, first introduced in Parliament by Sir Robert Grant in 1830, owed its final passage through the House of Lords in 1858 to Goldsmid's energetic work.

He helped to establish the University College Hospital in 1834, serving as its treasurer for eighteen years, and also aided in the efforts to obtain reform in the English penal code.

In 1841, he became the first (unconverted to Christianity) Jewish baronet, the honour being conferred upon him by Lord Melbourne. He was a made a Fellow of the Royal Society in 1828, presumably for his part in the foundation of UCL.

He was made Baron da Palmeira by the Portuguese government in 1846 for services rendered in settling a monetary dispute between Portugal and Brazil.

=== Personal life and death ===
He married his cousin Isabel and their second son was Sir Francis Goldsmid, 2nd Baronet (1808–1878). In 1849, he bought Somerhill House near Tonbridge, Kent. He died on 27 April 1859. Upon his death, it passed to his son Frederick.

== See also ==
- Goldsmid family – article about the Goldsmid family
- History of the Jews in England

== Sources ==
Baronetage of the United Kingdom
New creation	Baronet (of St John's Lodge); 1841–1859	Succeeded by Francis Henry Goldsmid
