= 1811 in art =

Events in the year 1811 in Art.

== Events ==
- 29 April – The Royal Academy Exhibition of 1811 opens at Somerset House in London.

== Works ==
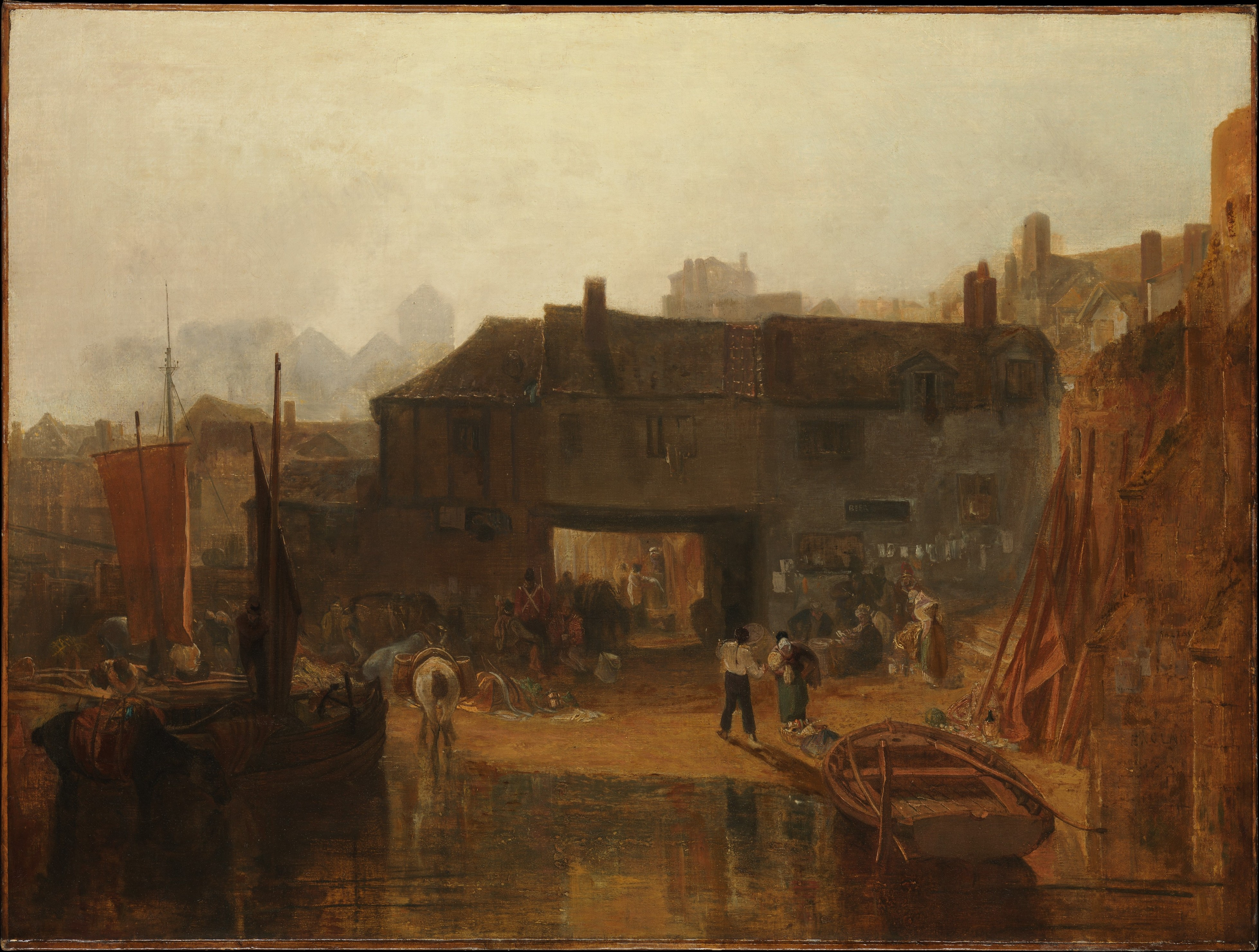
Saltash with the Water Ferry by J. M. W. Turner

- Caspar David Friedrich – Morning on the Riesengebirge
- François Gérard – Portrait of Jérôme Bonaparte
- Thomas Lawrence – Portrait of George Hibbert
- Guillaume Guillon-Lethière – Homer Singing His Iliad at the Gates of Athens
- Francesco Hayez – Aristotle
- Jean Auguste Dominique Ingres – Jupiter and Thetis
- Georg Friedrich Kersting – Caspar David Friedrich in his Studio
- J. M. W. Turner
  - Apollo and Python
  - Hulks on the Tamar
  - Saltash with the Water Ferry
- David Wilkie – The Village Holiday

== Births ==
- January 2 – Uroš Knežević, Serbian painter (d. 1876)
- March 20 – George Caleb Bingham, American realist artist (died 1879)
- April 5 – Jules Dupré, French painter (died 1889)
- May 11 – Prince Grigory Gagarin, Russian soldier and painter (died 1893)
- May 15 – Katarina Ivanović, Serbian painter (died 1882)
- July 28 – Charles West Cope, English genre painter (died 1890)
- December 3 – Eduard Bendemann, German painter (died 1889)
- unknown date
  - Nam Gyewoo, Korean painter and government officer (died 1888)
  - Jakob Guttmann, Romanian-born Hungarian Jewish sculptor (died 1860)
  - Auguste Ottin, French sculptor (died 1890)
  - Pierre Étienne Rémillieux, French painter (died 1856)

== Deaths ==
- January 8 – Sir Francis Bourgeois, court painter to King George III of the United Kingdom (born 1753)
- January 10
  - Luigi Frisoni, Italian painter (born 1760)
  - Martin Ferdinand Quadal, Moravian-Austrian painter and engraver (born 1736)
- January 12 – Félix Boisselier, French historical painter (born 1776)
- January 21 – Nicolas Henri Joseph de Fassin, Belgian landscape painter (born 1728)
- February 19 – Joaquín Inza y Ainsa, Spanish Baroque painter (born 1736)
- March 1 – Jean-Simon Berthélemy, French history painter (born 1743)
- March 4 – Gilles-Louis Chrétien, French musician and creator of the physionotrace used for portraits (born 1754)
- April 28 – Johann Baptist Drechsler, Austrian painter of flowers (born 1766)
- May 1 – John Smart, English painter of portrait miniatures (born 1740)
- July 16 – Joseph Barber, English landscape painter and art teacher (born 1757)
- July 28 – Abraham Abramson, Prussian coiner and medallist (born 1752/1754)
- September 16 – Jacob Adam, Austrian copper etcher (born 1748)
- September 30 – Antoine Raspal, French painter (born 1738)
- October 5 – Adolf Ulrik Wertmüller, Swedish painter (born 1751)
- October 15 – Sir Nathaniel Dance-Holland, English portrait painter and politician (born 1735)
- December 22 – François Devosge, French portrait painter (born 1732)
- date unknown – George Keith Ralph, British portrait painter (born 1752)
