= Somer Hill, Tonbridge =

Painting by J. M. W. Turner

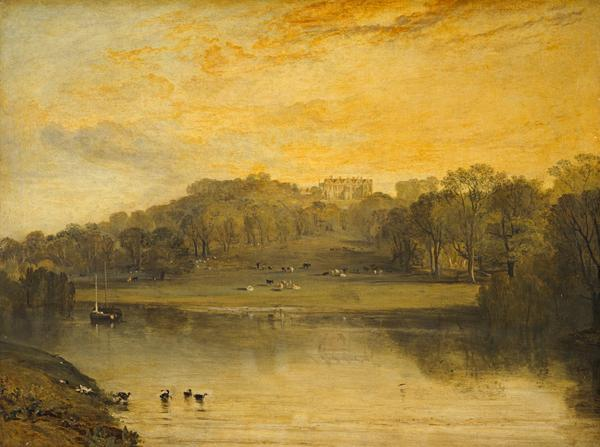
- Artist: J.M.W. Turner
- Year: 1811
- Type: Oil on canvas, landscape painting
- Dimensions: 92 cm × 122 cm (36 in × 48 in)
- Location: Scottish National Gallery, Edinburgh

Somer Hill, Tonbridge is an 1811 landscape painting by the British artist J.M.W. Turner. It shows a view of the Jacobean Somerhill House near Tonbridge in Kent, seen across a lake during the sunrise.

Turner sketched the house during a visit in 1810 which he combined with a commission from Mad Jack Fuller to paint Rosehill Park in Sussex. In the event the owner of Somerhill, Major Woodgate, didn't purchase the view of the house as Turner may have hoped. The work was displayed at the Royal Academy Exhibition of 1811 at Somerset House in London. Today the painting is in the collection of the Scottish National Gallery in Edinburgh, having been acquired in 1922.

== See also ==
- List of paintings by J. M. W. Turner

== Bibliography ==
- Bailey, Anthony. J.M.W. Turner: Standing in the Sun. Tate Enterprises Ltd, 2013.
- Boime, Albert. A Social History of Modern Art, Volume 2: Art in an Age of Bonapartism, 1800-1815. University of Chicago Press, 1993.
- Hamilton, James. Turner's Britain. Merrell, 2003
- Reynolds, Graham. Turner. Thames & Hudson, 2022.
