= Joseph Nigg =

Austrian painter (1782–1863)

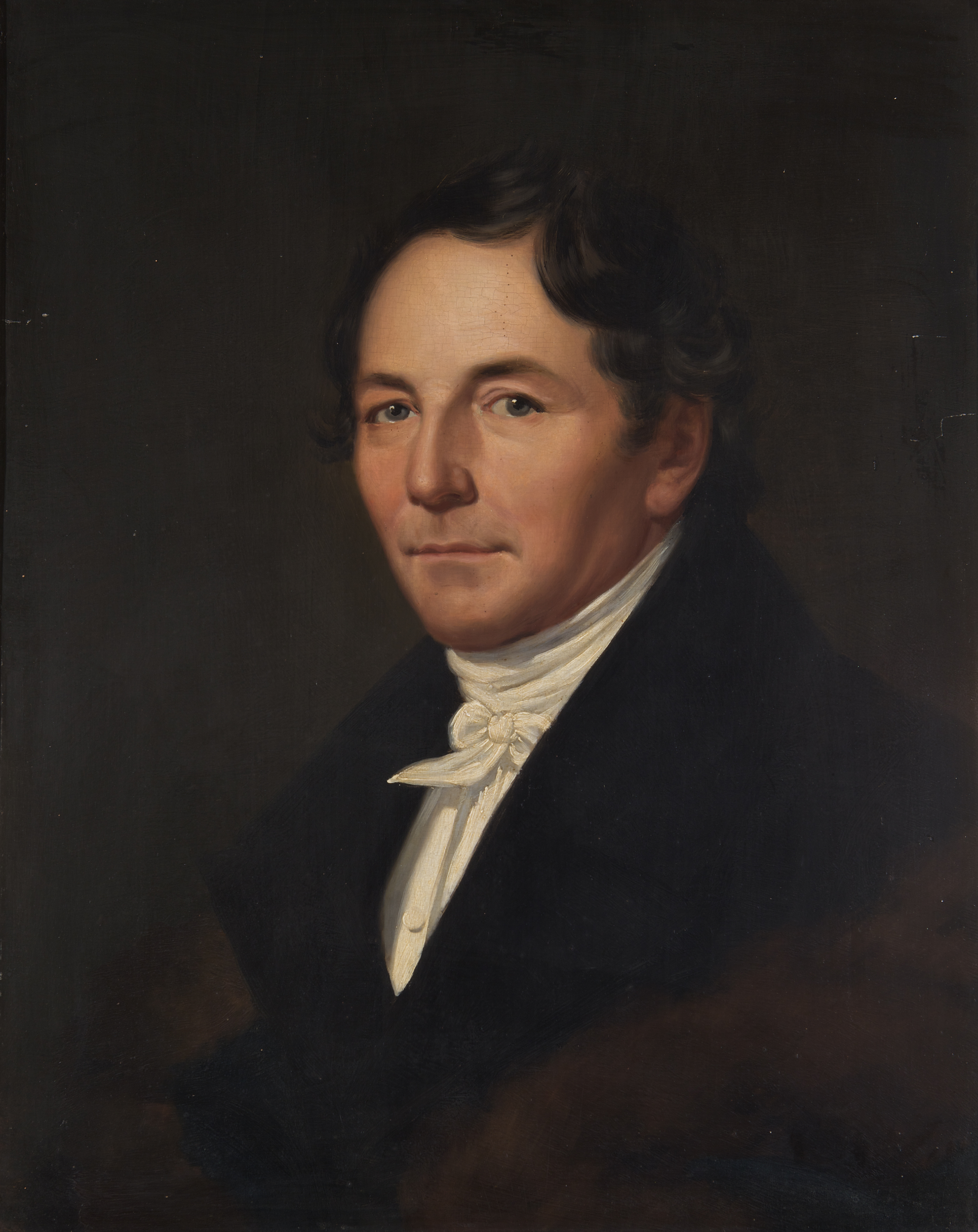
- 1835 portrait of Joseph Nigg by an unknown artist
- Born: 13 October 1782; Vienna, Habsburg monarchy
- Died: 19 September 1863 (aged 80); Vienna, Austrian Empire
- Occupation: Painter
- Known for: Paintings of flowers upon porcelain

Joseph Nigg (13 October 1782 – 19 September 1863) was an Austrian painter, with painting on porcelain a specialty.

== Life ==
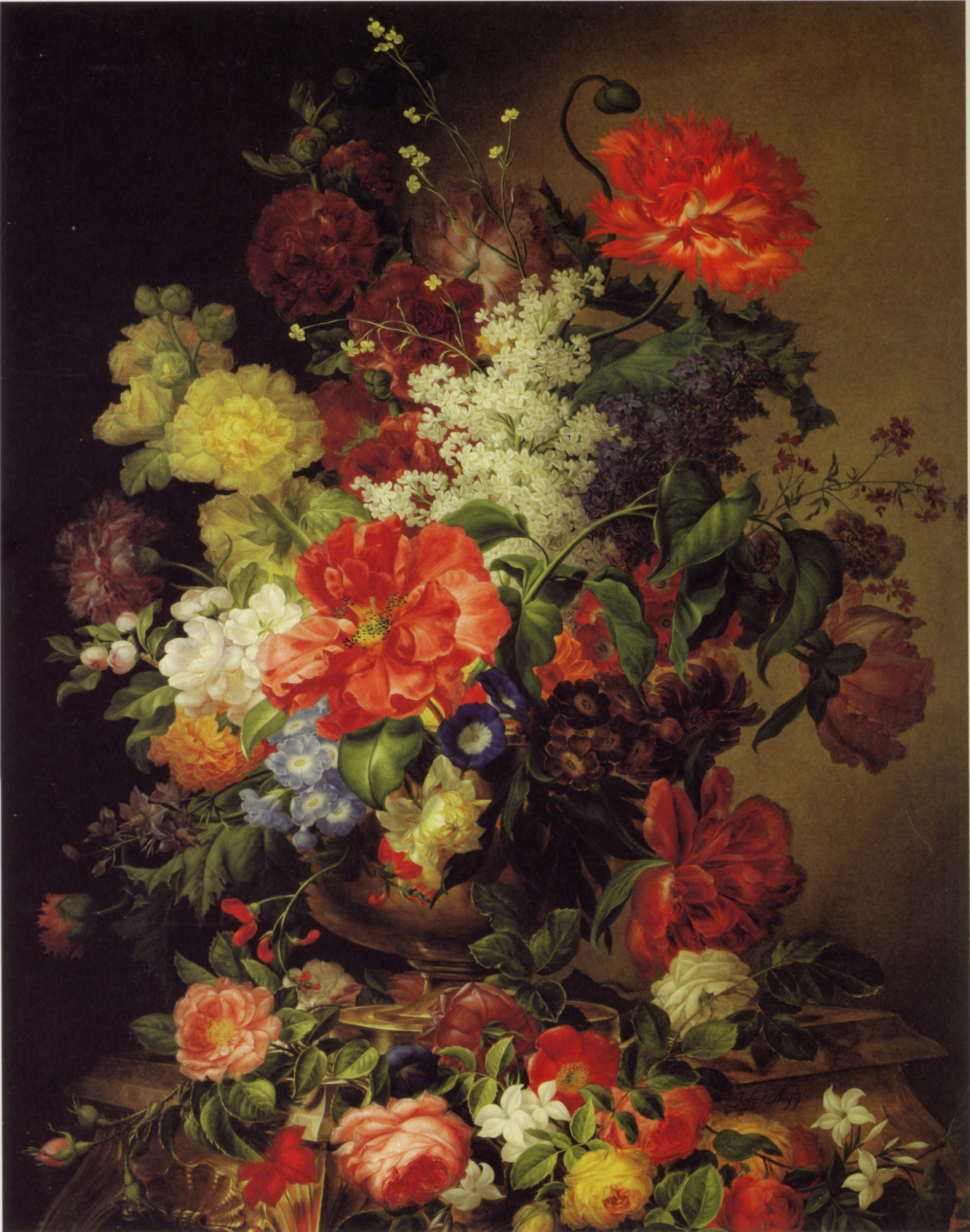
Flower Arrangement by Joseph Nigg

Born in Vienna, Nigg studied at the Academy of Fine Arts Vienna with Johann Baptist Drechsler. From 1800 to 1843, Nigg worked as a flower painter in a Viennese porcelain factory. Beginning in 1835, this post also involved holding classes in painting at the factory. With the advent of the Biedermeier Era, flower painting became immensely popular and was also to be found on large porcelain plaques. A piece of this sort, thirty inches in height, was presented by Nigg, on behalf of the Viennese factory, at the Great Exhibition of 1851 in London.

In addition to working in porcelain, Nigg also created oil paintings, watercolors, and pastel drawings. Two of his paintings, "Grandmother's Bouquet I" and "Grandmother's Bouquet II", have found enduring popularity as poster and print reproductions. Nigg died in Vienna in 1863.

== Sources ==
- Constantin von Wurzbach: "Nigg, Joseph". In: Biographisches Lexikon des Kaiserthums Oesterreich. 20. Theil. Kaiserlich-königliche Hof- und Staatsdruckerei, Vienna 1869, pp. 353 f.
- H. Schöny: "Nigg Josef". In: Österreichisches Biographisches Lexikon 1815–1950 (ÖBL). Band 7, Verlag der Österreichischen Akademie der Wissenschaften, Vienna 1978, ISBN 3700101872, p. 127
