= Franz Xaver Petter =

Austrian artist (1791–1866)

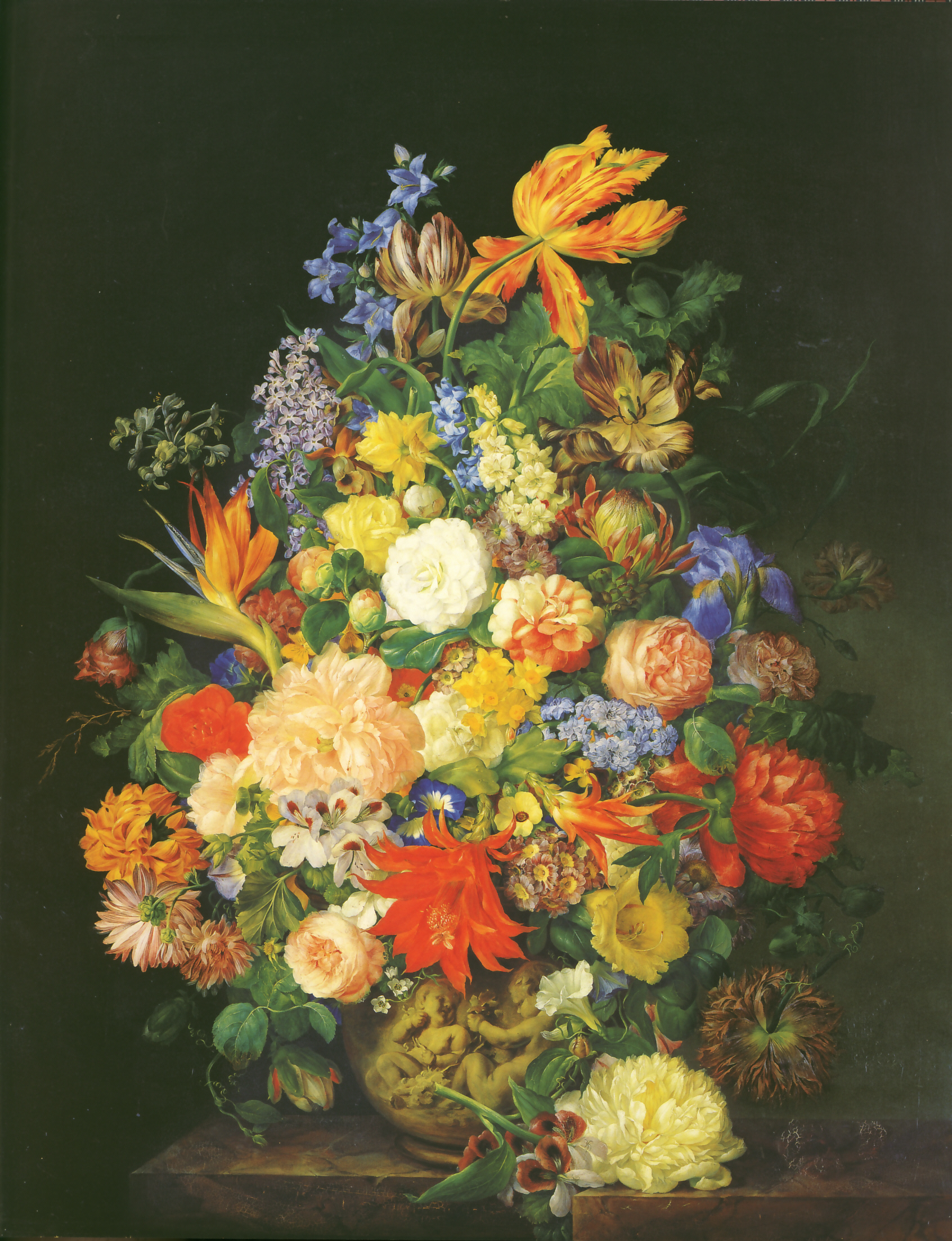
Flowers in a Vase, 1845

Franz Xaver Andreas Petter (23 October 1791 – 11 May 1866) was an Austrian artist. Petter was born in Lichtental; his father was a painter of porcelain, and it was intended that he should follow in the same profession, but Petter developed an interest in oil painting. He studied under Johann Baptist Drechsler at the Academy of Fine Arts Vienna.

Franz Xaver Petter was one of the most important still-life artists of the Biedermeier period in Vienna. He specialised in floral arrangements, and later arrangements of fruit, and landscapes with flowers, continuing the Dutch Golden Age flower still life depicting traditions. Petter's pictures were very popular with the Austrian nobility.

Petter married Catherine Hamböck (1793-1858). They had two sons, Theodore, who became an artist, and Gustav, a musician. Franz Xaver Petter died in May 1866 in Vienna.
