= Morning on the Riesengebirge =

Painting by Caspar David Friedrich

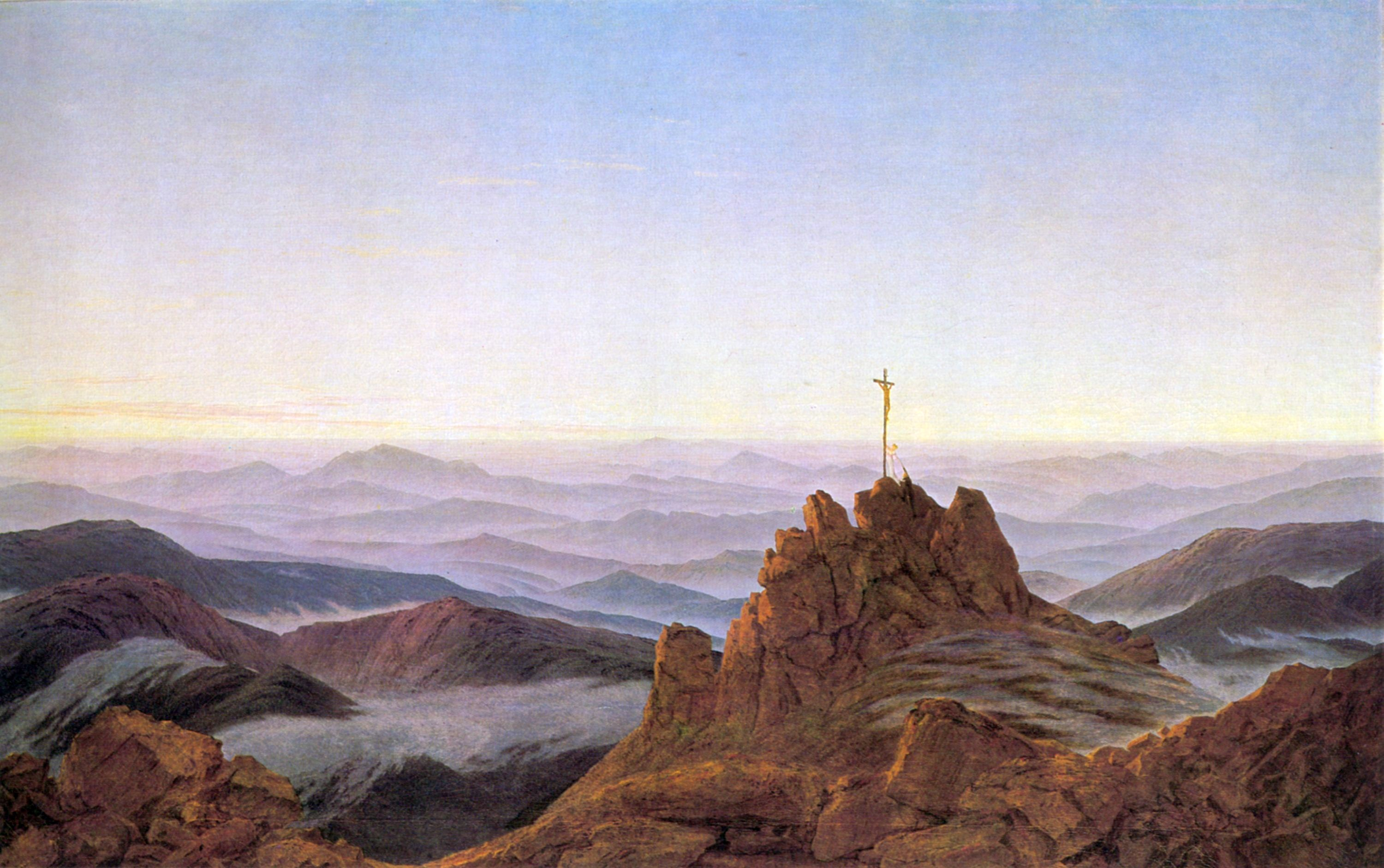
- Artist: Caspar David Friedrich
- Year: 1810–1811
- Medium: oil on canvas
- Dimensions: 108 cm × 170 cm (43 in × 67 in)
- Location: Schloss Charlottenburg, Berlin

Morning on the Riesengebirge (German: Morgen im Riesengebirge) is an 1810–1811 painting by the German Romantic artist Caspar David Friedrich of a scene on the Riesengebirge. It was exhibited at the Dresden Academy, where it attracted significant public attention. The painting was then acquired in 1811 by Frederick William III of Prussia for Unter den Linden, his Berlin palace, where it remained until 1837, when it was moved to the New Palace in Potsdam.

From 1844 to 1865 it was exhibited in the Schloss Bellevue then later in the castle at Wiesbaden. After 1930, it was moved back to Berlin, where it was displayed in the Stadtschloss. In 1957, it was moved to Schloss Charlottenburg (with inventory number 6911 GK I) as the property of the Prussian State Museums (inventory number NG 10/85).

The painting blends a mixture of religious allegory and Friedrich's distinctive approach to landscape painting, which made the work popular in his time.

== Description ==
Friedrich was captivated by mountains, which prompted his journey to analyze the Riesengebirge in 1810. He diligently sketched the Riesengebirge mountain range and studied its rock formations. His observations culminated in a painting that depicts the sun rising over the mountains at dawn with a few notable figures and symbols.

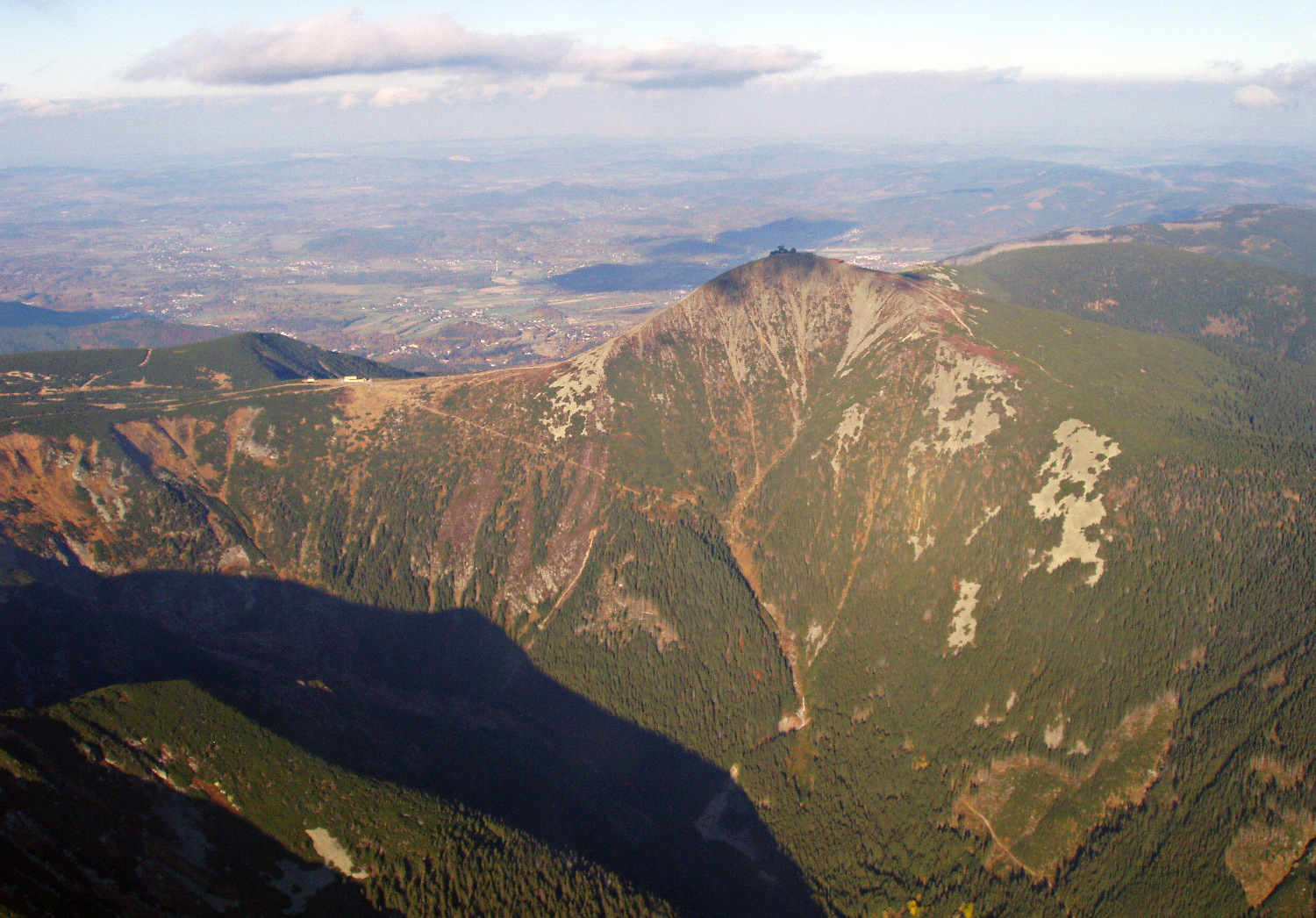
Image of the Riesengebirge Mountains

In the painting, a woman helps a man go up the mountain, and they are advancing towards a man crucified on a cross, presumably Jesus Christ. According to Werner Hoffman, Friedrich uses the differences in elevation to demonstrate how a woman's "role is to lead her partner onwards and upwards."

== Techniques ==
=== Rückenfigur ===
Scholars describe the man as a recurring figure in Friedrich's paintings. The man's gaze faces away from the viewer, making him a Rückenfigur, a trope in which the figure's back faces the viewer. The viewer can project themself onto the figure and imagine seeing the landscape for themself. Friedrich frequently used the Rückenfigur to emphasize the subjective experience of landscape. The man not only appears in many Friedrich paintings, but may very well be Friedrich himself, symbolizing his own interpretation of the landscape painting that he created.

=== Blending ===
A viewer can observe the horizon where the open sky and the earth's surface meet. According to Werner Hofmann, the elemental subjects of sky and earth have a harmonious relationship within the painting. Hofmann also notes that the sky and mist contrast with the weight of the mountains in the foreground. Charles Sala observes that Friedrich uses mist as a symbol of "a classical allegory of our befogged terrestrial existence and the search for a spiritual light which is just about to break and spread throughout the world." The art historian Nina Amstutz suggests that the blending of different natural phenomena shows that nature is not merely observed, but experienced. Friedrich pursued subjective empiricism, a method which utilized the painter's extensive research and detailed sketches with his imagination of the mountain. By combining objective and subjective elements, Friedrich gave personality to the landscape while portraying it fairly accurately.

=== Spiritual elements ===
Scholars have devoted much attention to the religious iconography in the painting. The cross alludes to the Crucifixion of Christ, and Friedrich's other works include this symbol. According to Charles Sala, there is a tension between the "realism of the couple and the allegorical idealization of the landscape." Friedrich doesn't bring the cross to the forefront or magnify its size. Instead, it stands in stark contrast to the sprawling background of nature. Rather than the painting being an overt statement for a Christian cause, Sala argues that it explores the "path of the personal self and that of Christian asceticism," by drawing the comparison between the "couple and the light-filled landscape." Johannes Grave considered the painting to be a reaction to Friedrich Wilhelm Basilius von Ramdohr's criticism of the Tetschen Altarpiece.

== Reception ==
Some critics praised Friedrich's "faithful representation of nature," applauding his ability to portray it pleasantly, accurately, and personified.

Others were displeased with the painter's depiction of a woman helping up a man. One critic wrote: "The lady beside the crucifix, holding out her weak hand to a gentleman in this inaccessible place, is another thing I do not altogether care for, because the modern and the personal become insignificant in the midst of the great simplicity of nature."

== See also ==
- List of works by Caspar David Friedrich

== Sources ==
- Amstutz, Nina. Caspar David Friedrich: Nature and the Self. New Haven: Yale University Press, 2020.
- Grave, Johannes. Caspar David Friedrich (2nd ed.). London/New York: Prestel, 2017.
- Koerner, Joseph Leo. Caspar David Friedrich and the Subject of Landscape. New Haven: Yale University Press, 1990.
- Vaughan, William, and Friedrich, Caspar David. Friedrich. London; New York: Phaidon, 2004.
- Hofmann, Werner, Friedrich, Caspar David, and Whittall, Mary. Caspar David Friedrich. London; New York: Thames & Hudson, 2000.
- Sala, Charles., and Friedrich, Caspar David. Caspar David Friedrich: the Spirit of Romantic Painting. Paris: Terrail, 1994.
