= Johann Baptist Drechsler =

Austrian artist (1766–1811)

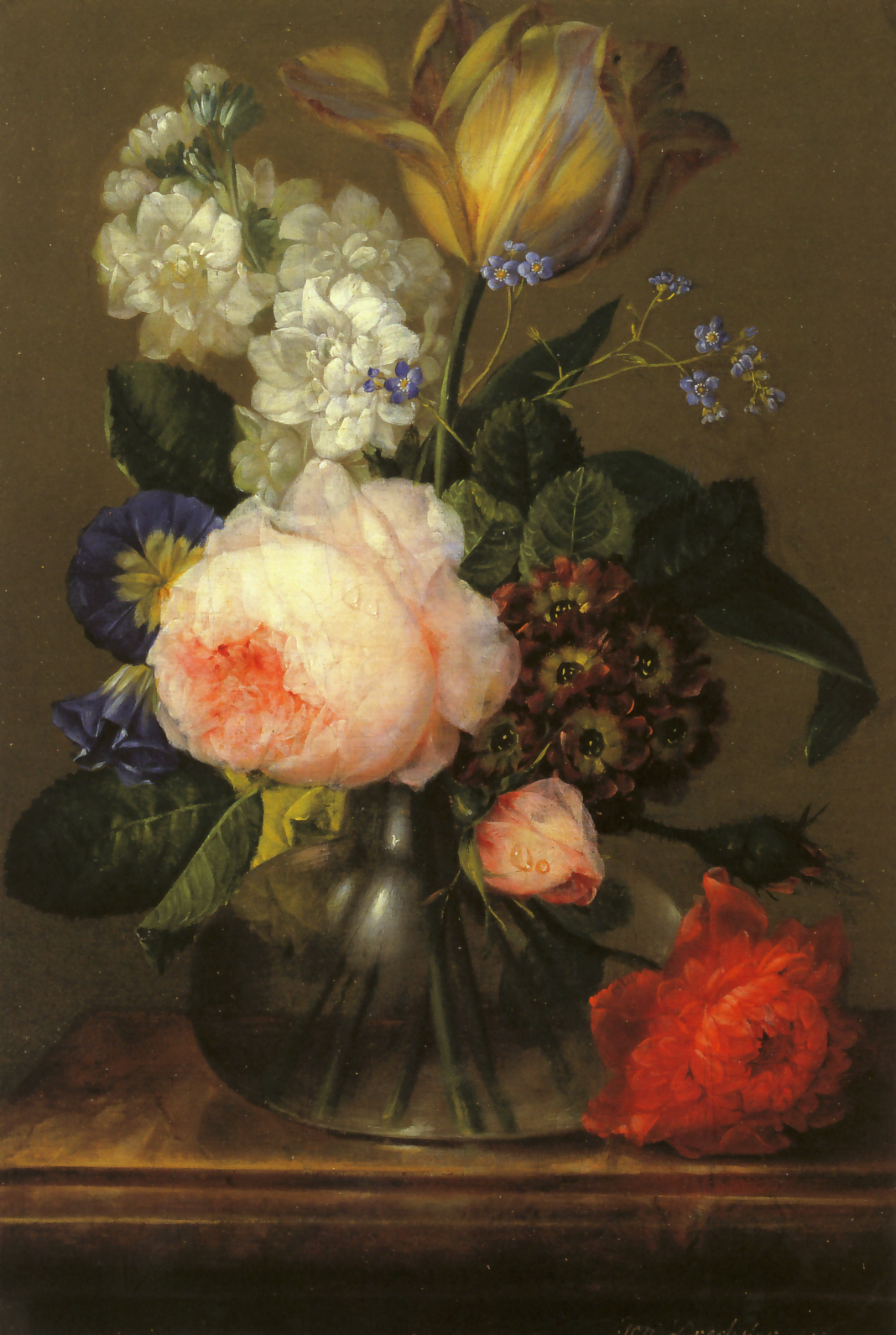
Small flower piece, 1805, now in the Österreichische Galerie Belvedere

Johann Baptist Drechsler (28 January 1766 – 28 April 1811) was an Austrian painter of flowers

== Life ==
Drechsler was born in Vienna in 1766, the son of a porcelain painter. In 1787 he became the first professor of flower-painting at the Academy of Fine Arts in Vienna, where his students included Josef Nigg and Franz Xaver Petter. His style was particularly influenced by the finely detailed work of the Dutch flower-painter Jan van Huysum. He is recorded as working at the Vienna Porcelain Manufactory between 1772 and 1782.

There are examples of his work in the Hermitage at St. Petersburg, and in the Kunsthistorisches Museum.

He died at Vienna in 1811.

== Gallery ==
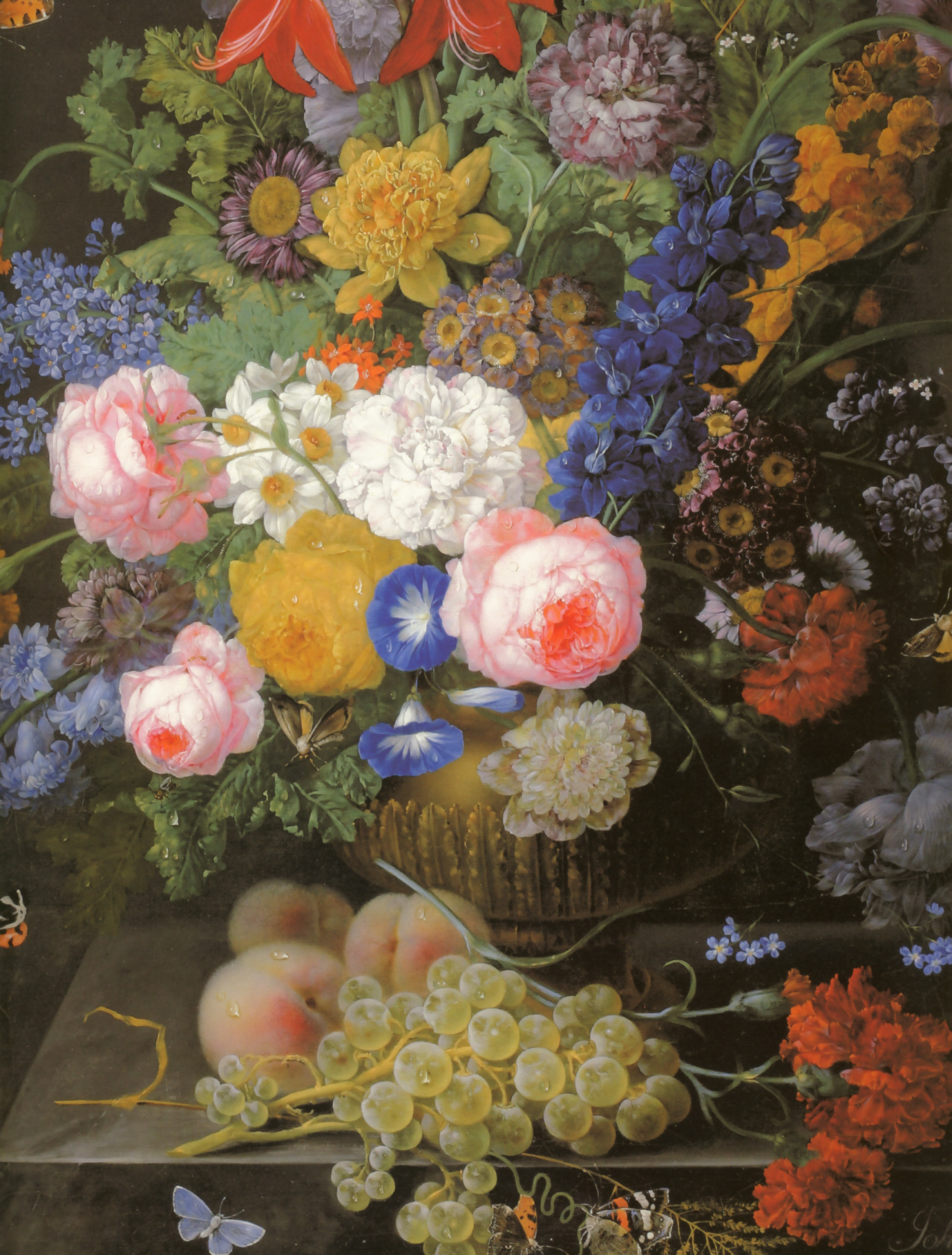
Blumenstillleben, 1808

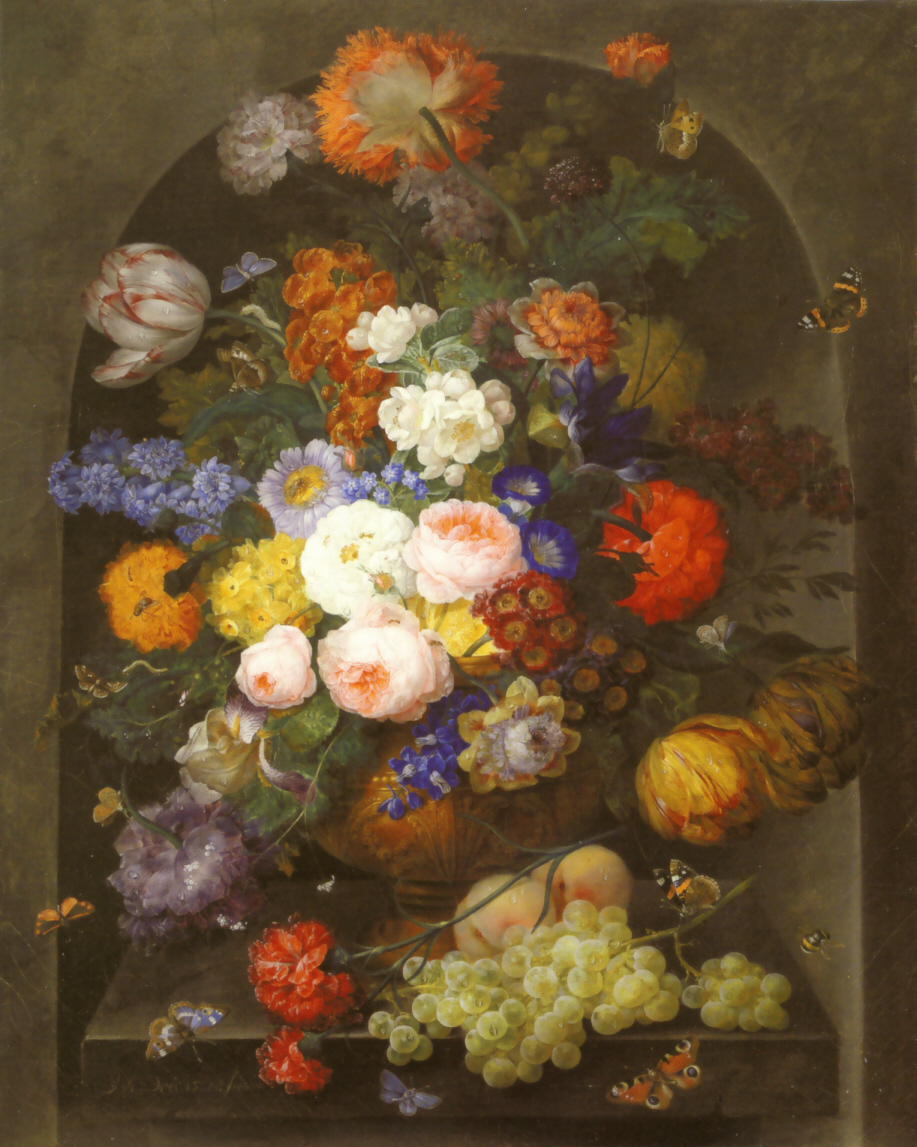
Großes Blumenstück, 1808

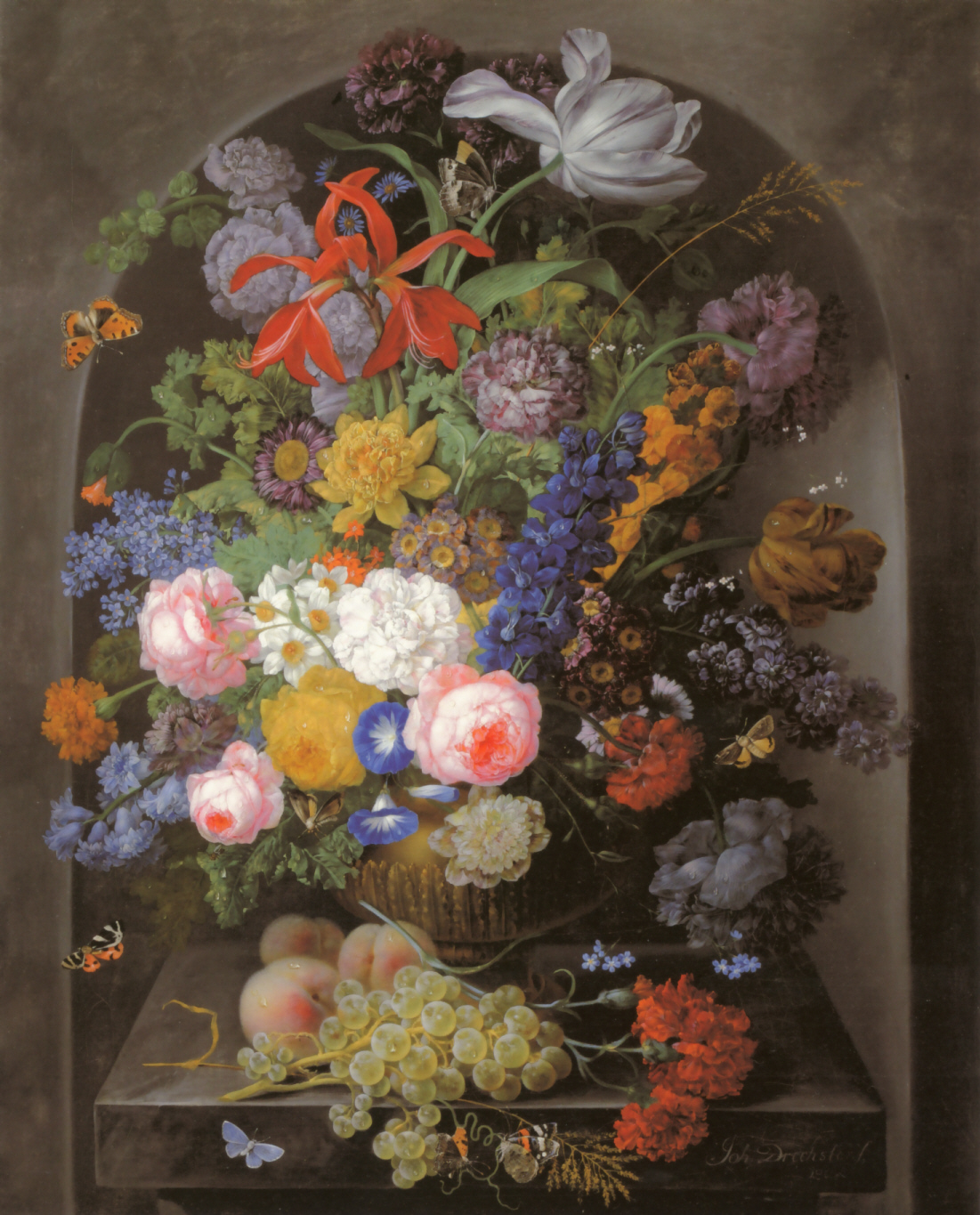
Blumenstilleben, 1808
