= Apollo and Python =

Painting by J. M. W. Turner

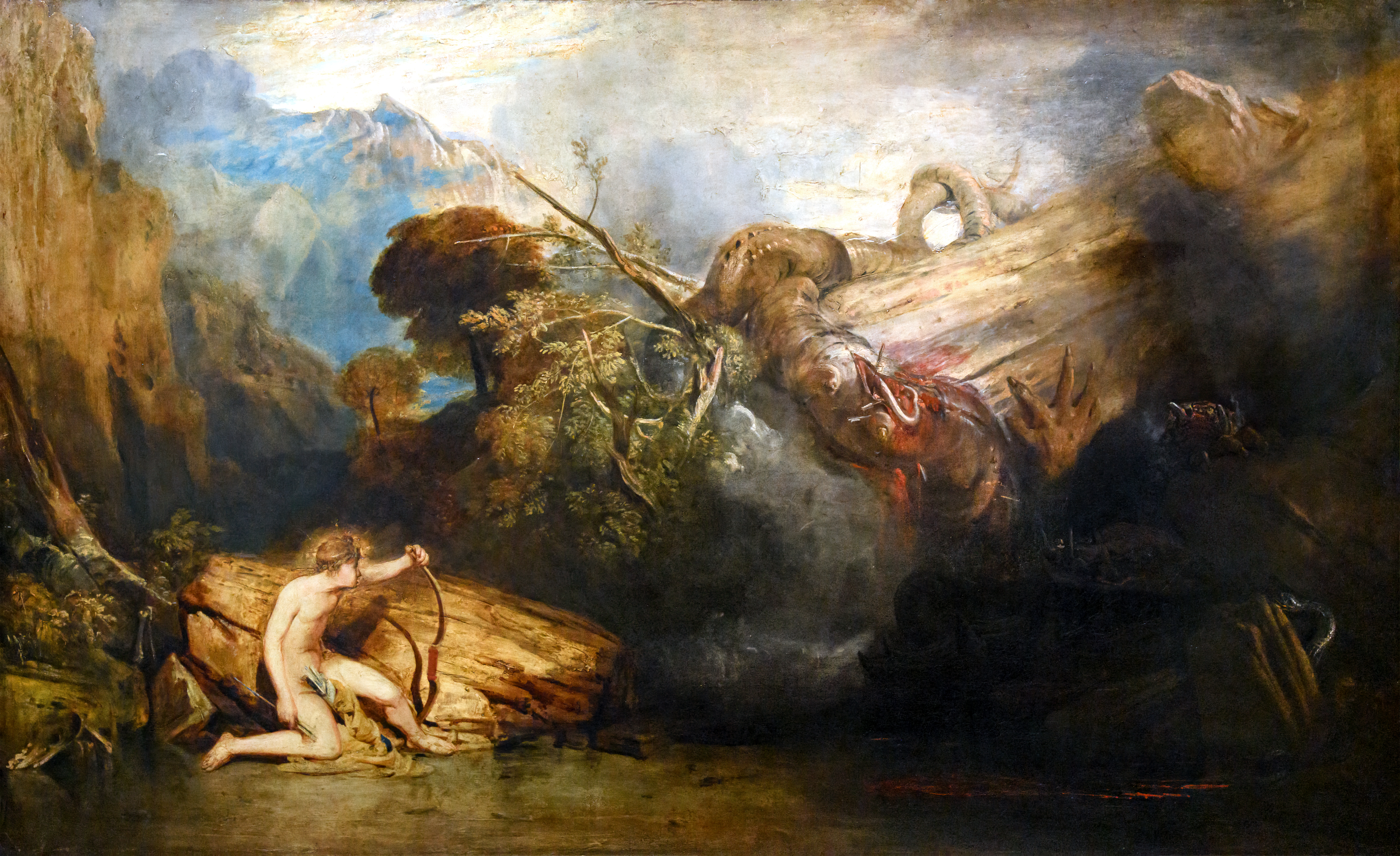
- Artist: J. M. W. Turner
- Year: 1811
- Type: Oil on canvas
- Dimensions: 237.5 cm × 145.4 cm (93.5 in × 57.2 in)
- Location: Tate Britain, London
- Website: www.tate.org.uk/...n00488

Apollo and Python is an 1811 oil painting by the English artist J.M.W. Turner. A combination of landscape and history painting, It depicts the ancient Greek Myth of Python, a giant serpent in combat against Apollo.

It was displayed at the Royal Academy's Summer Exhibition of 1811 at Somerset House. Today the painting is in the collection of the Tate Britain in Pimlico, having been part of the Turner Bequest of 1856

== See also ==
- List of paintings by J. M. W. Turner

== Bibliography ==
- Finley, Gerald. Angel in the Sun: Turner's Vision of History. McGill-Queen's University Press, 2019.
- Hartley, Lucy. Democratising Beauty in Nineteenth-Century Britain: Art and the Politics of Public Life. Cambridge University Press, 2017.
