= Saltash with the Water Ferry =

Painting by J. M. W. Turner

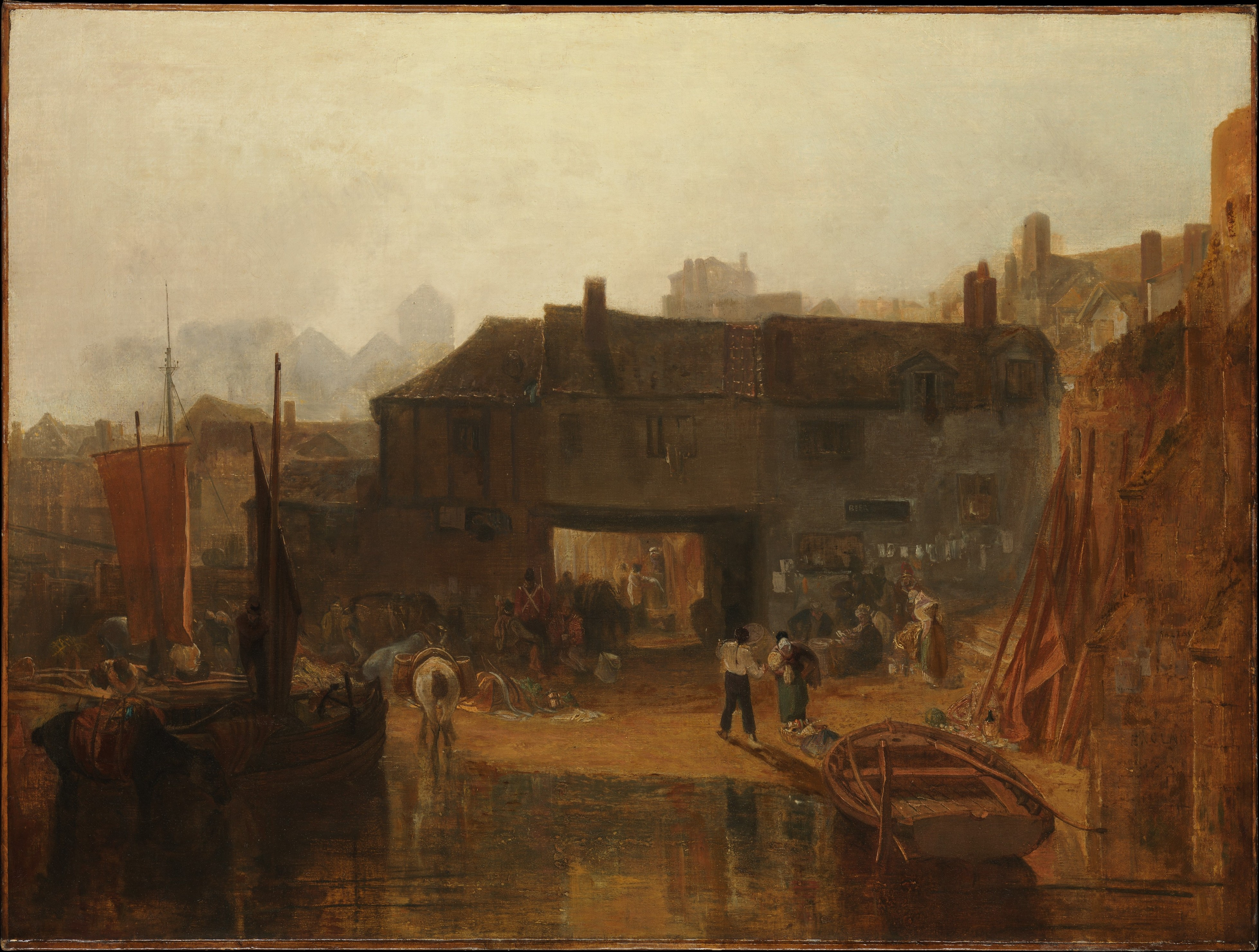
- Artist: J. M. W. Turner
- Year: 1811
- Type: Oil on canvas, landscape
- Dimensions: 89.9 cm × 120.7 cm (35.4 in × 47.5 in)
- Location: Metropolitan Museum of Art, New York City

Saltash with the Water Ferry is an 1811 landscape painting by the British artist Joseph Mallord William Turner. It depicts the town of Saltash on the River Tamar, directly across from the major port of Plymouth in Devon A ferry ran between the two settlements and is depicted in the painting. It shows an inn and several smaller craft. The presence of a redcoat sentry and a quote from Horatio Nelson are reminders of the ongoing Napoleonic Wars.

Turner painted it during an 1811 visit to the West Country. He also produced a view of the nearby Hamoaze. Turner exhibited the painting in his own gallery in London rather than at the Royal Academy's Summer Exhibition. In 1846 it was displayed at the Royal Hibernian Academy in Dublin. The work is today in the collection of the Metropolitan Museum of Art in New York City, having been acquired in 1889 through the Marquand Collection of Henry Gurdon Marquand.

== See also ==
- List of paintings by J. M. W. Turner

== Bibliography ==
- Baetjer, Katharine. British Paintings in the Metropolitan Museum of Art, 1575-1875. Metropolitan Museum of Art, 2009.
- Hokanson, Alison. Turner's Whaling Pictures. Metropolitan Museum of Art, 2016.
