= Hulks on the Tamar =

Painting by J.M.W. Turner

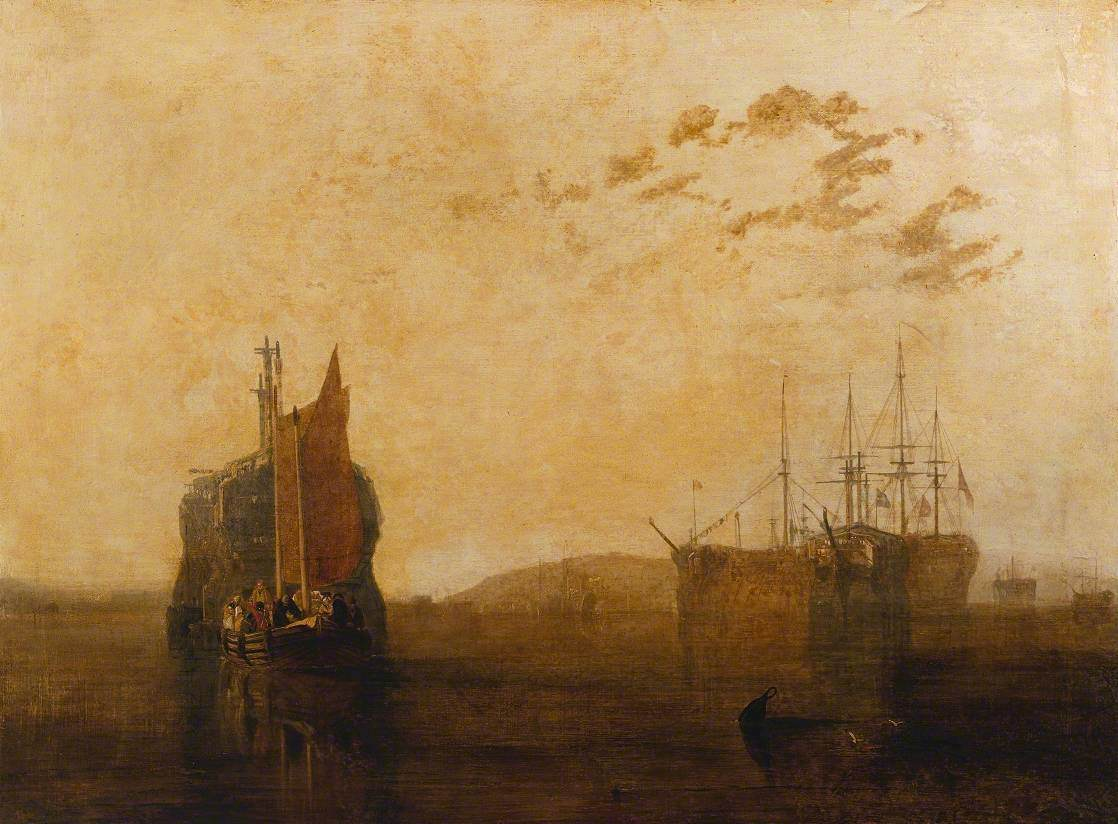
- Artist: Joseph Mallord William Turner
- Year: c 1811
- Type: Oil on canvas, landscape painting
- Dimensions: 120.2 cm × 89.2 cm (47.3 in × 35.1 in)
- Location: Petworth House; Sussex

Hulks on the Tamar is an 1811 landscape painting by the British artist J. M. W. Turner. It shows hulk on the River Tamar in the West of England as well as a sailing barge and warships of the Royal Navy. It was produced following a visit to Devon Turner had made that year.

Turner displayed the painting at an exhibition at his studio in Queen Anne Street in London. It was acquired by the art collector George Wyndham, 3rd Earl of Egremont for the Petworth House, his country house in Sussex. The Earl owned a number of paintings by Turner including Teignmouth, another product of the artist's trip to Devon. The painting was accepted by the government in acceptance in lieu and allocated to the Tate Gallery, although it remains in situ at Petworth as part of a permanent loan.

== See also ==
- List of paintings by J. M. W. Turner

== Bibliography ==
- Hamilton, James. Turner - A Life. Sceptre, 1998.
- Rowell, Christopher, Warrell, Ian & Brown, David Blayney. Turner at Petworth. Harry N. Abrams, 2002
