= Royal Academy Exhibition of 1811 =

1811 art exhibition in London

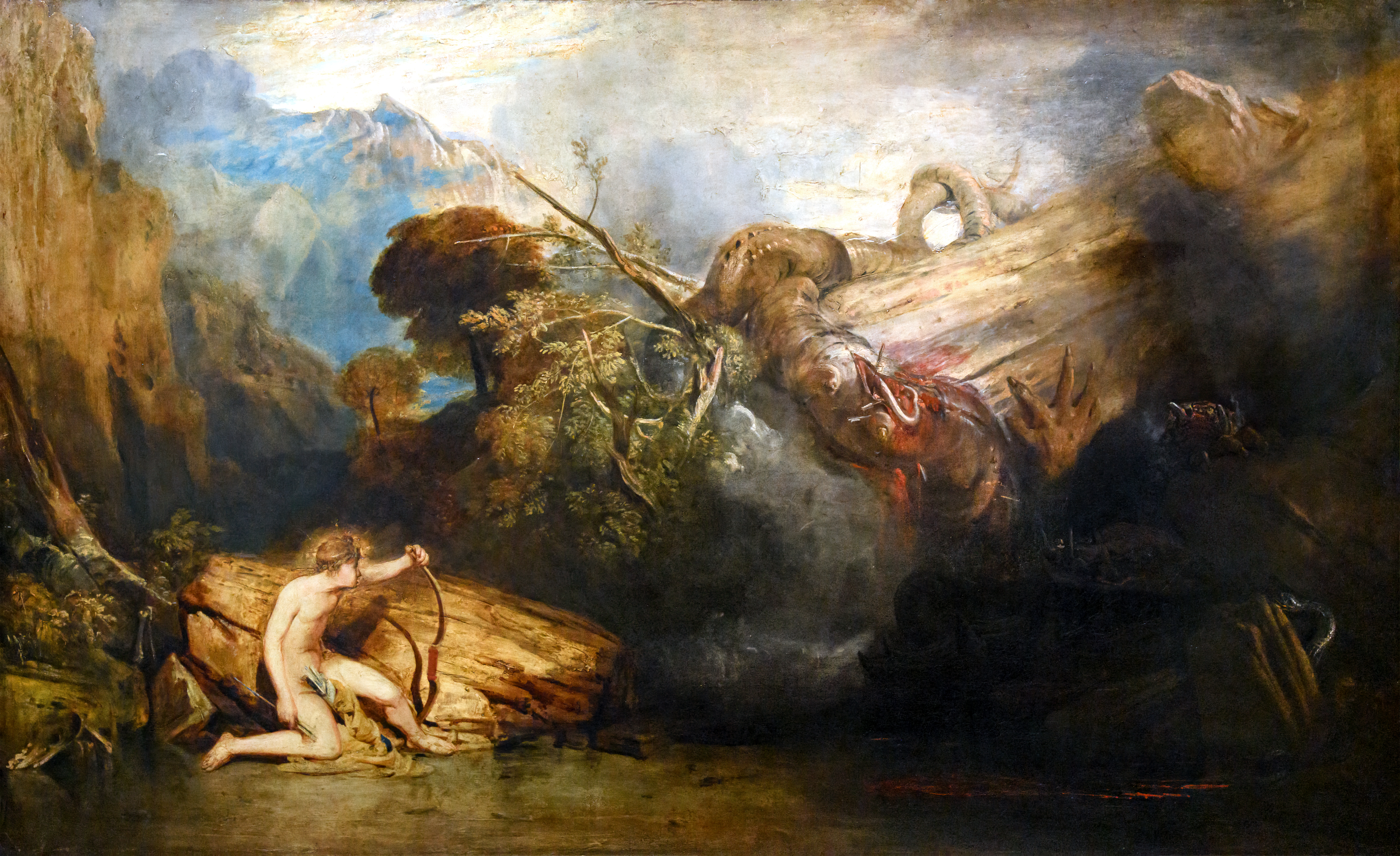
Apollo and Python by J. M. W. Turner

The Royal Academy Exhibition of 1811 was the forty third annual Summer Exhibition of the British Royal Academy of Arts. It was held at the Somerset House in London from 29 April to 15 June 1811 and featured submissions from leading painters, sculptors and architects of the Regency era The exhibition was attended by George, Prince of Wales who in February 1811 had been made Prince Regent following his father George III's mental illness.

The Exhibition took place while British was fighting in the Peninsular War. This was reflected in the portrait Thomas Lawrence displayed of the Anglo-Irish soldier Sir Charles Stewart, a friend and patron of him. Stewart was serving as Adjutant General to Lord Wellington at the time. It was the first of several he produced featuring Stewart, who later helped him gain major commissions from Regent for the Waterloo Chamber at Windsor Castle. Lawrence also displayed his Portrait of Benjamin West depicting the veteran American President of the Royal Academy Benjamin West. West himself displayed his epic history painting The Death of Nelson depicting the Battle of Trafalgar. He had previously exhibited privately in 1806 to great success during a dispute with the Royal Academy. He also showed the biblical scene Lot and His Daughters and the classically inspired Omnia Vincit Amor. The visiting American artist John Trumbull displayed a scene based on the poem The Lady of the Lake by Walter Scott and a portrait of the American statesman Alexander Hamilton.

J. M. W. Turner submitted a number of works the including history paintings Mercury and Herse and Apollo and Python and the landscapes Somer Hill, Tonbridge and Whalley Bridge and Abbey as well as the riverscape watercolour Flounder Fishing and Scarborough Town and Castle. The Regent praised Turner's Mercury and Herse in particular. John Constable's two exhibits were Twilight and Dedham Vale, a panoramic view of Dedham Vale in Constable Country.

== Gallery ==
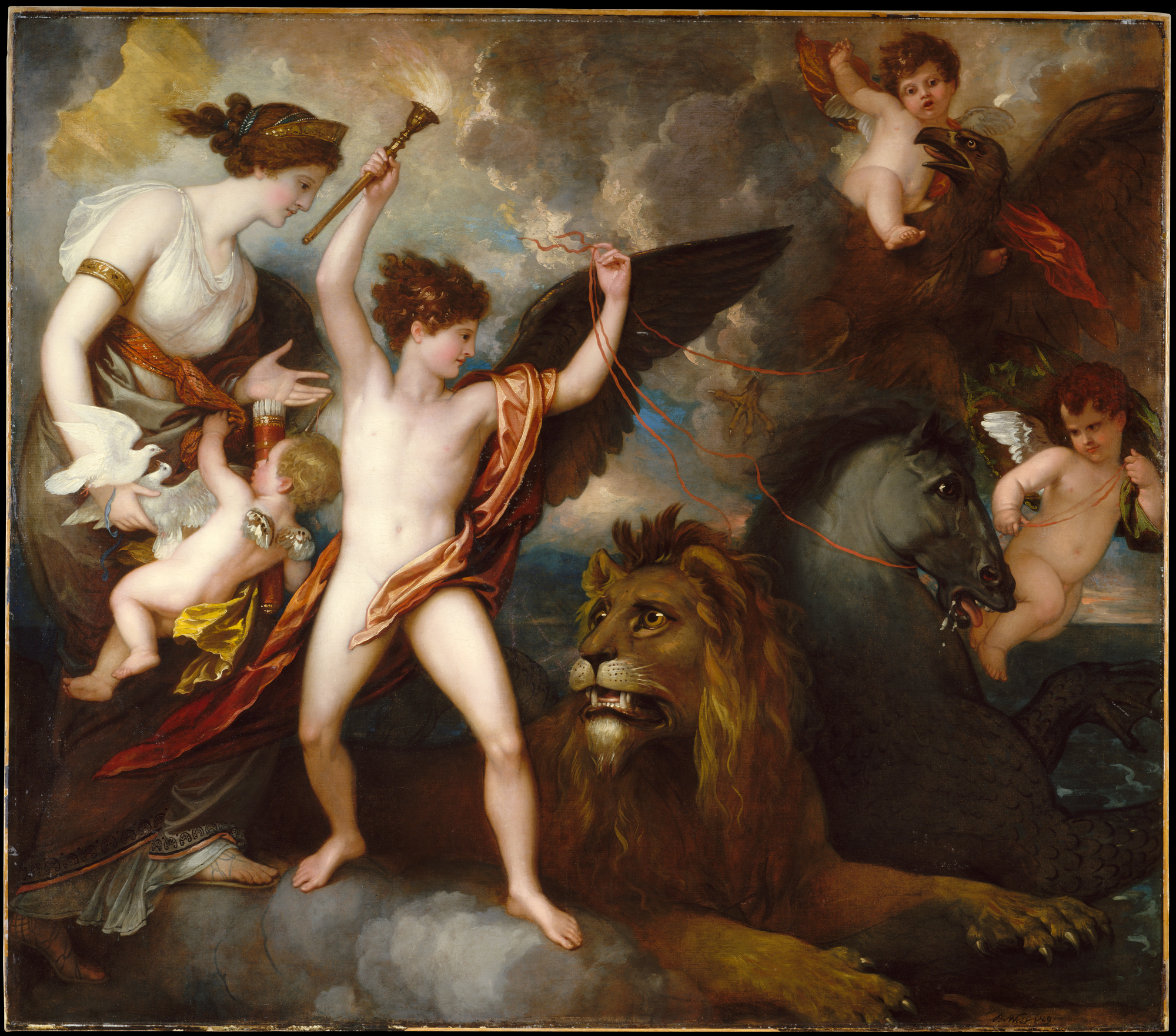
Omnia Vincit Amor by Benjamin West

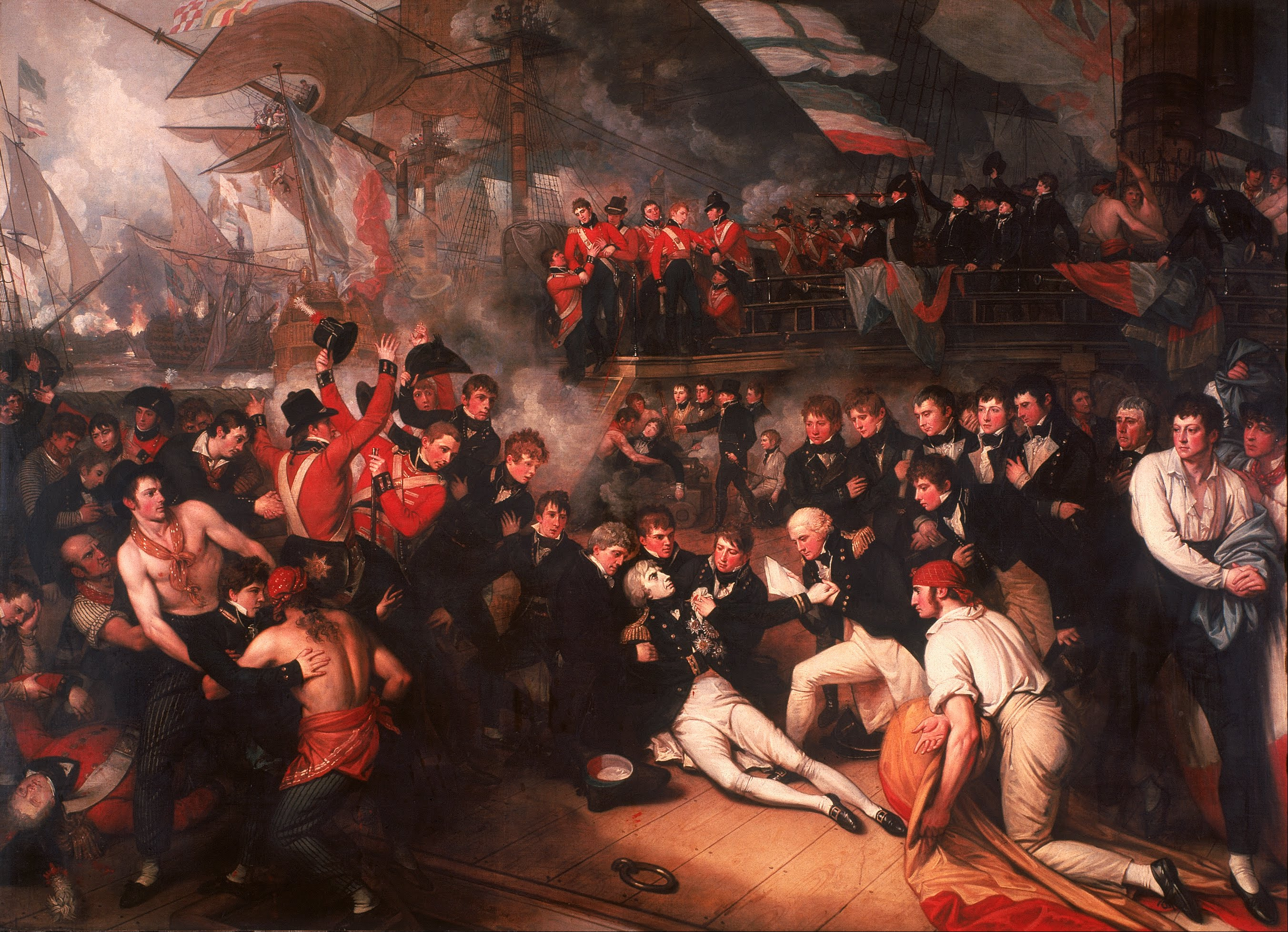
The Death of Nelson by Benjamin West

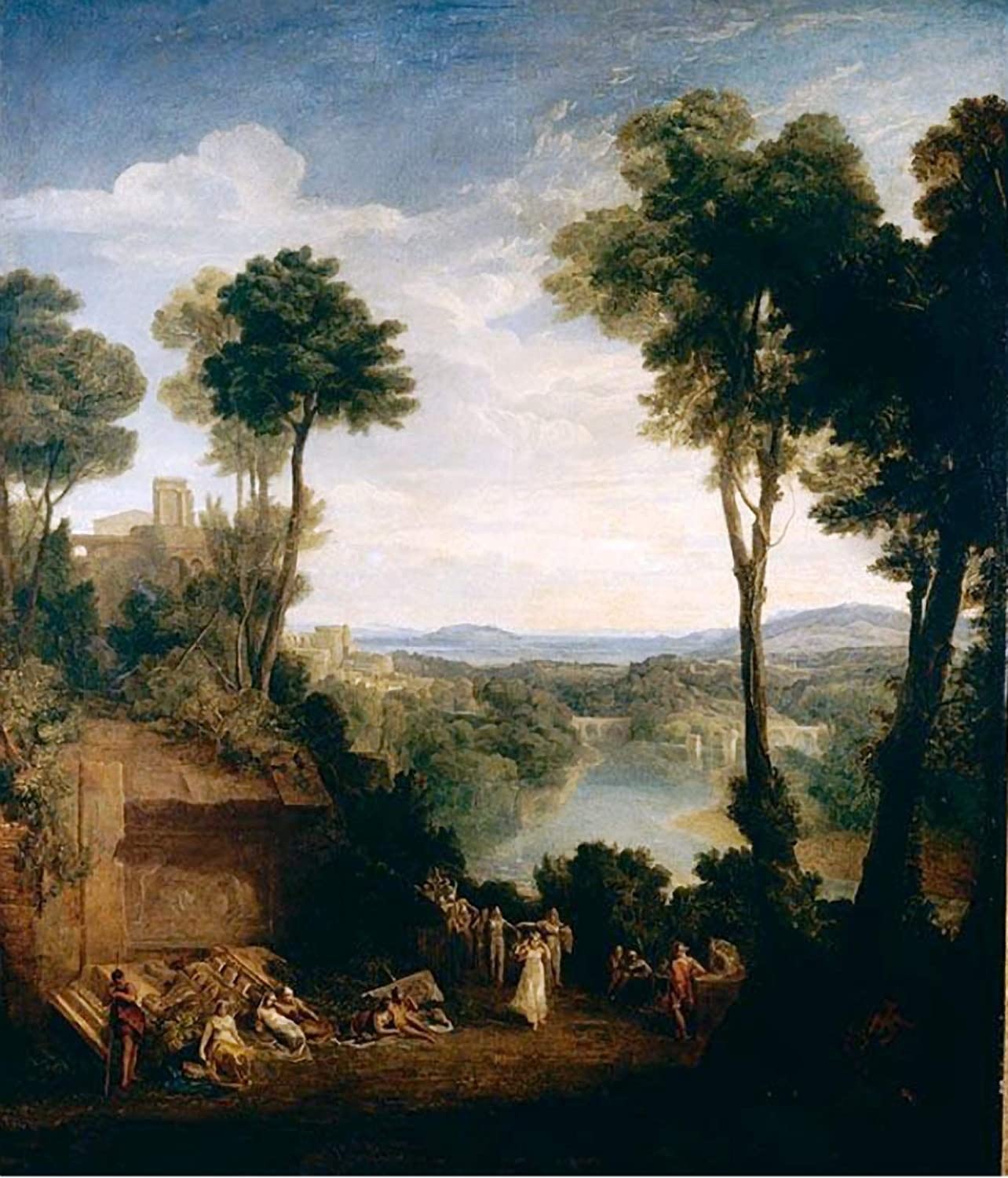
Mercury and Herse by J. M. W. Turner

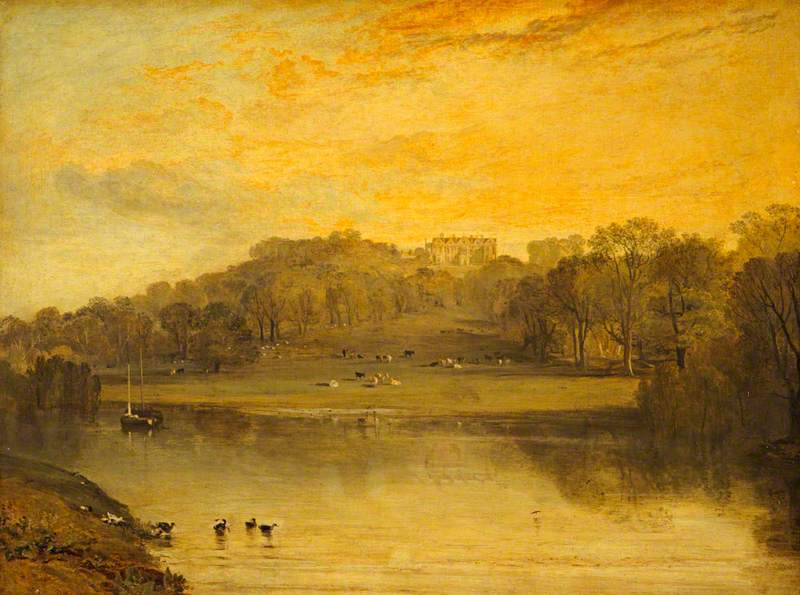
Somer Hill, Tonbridge by J. M. W. Turner

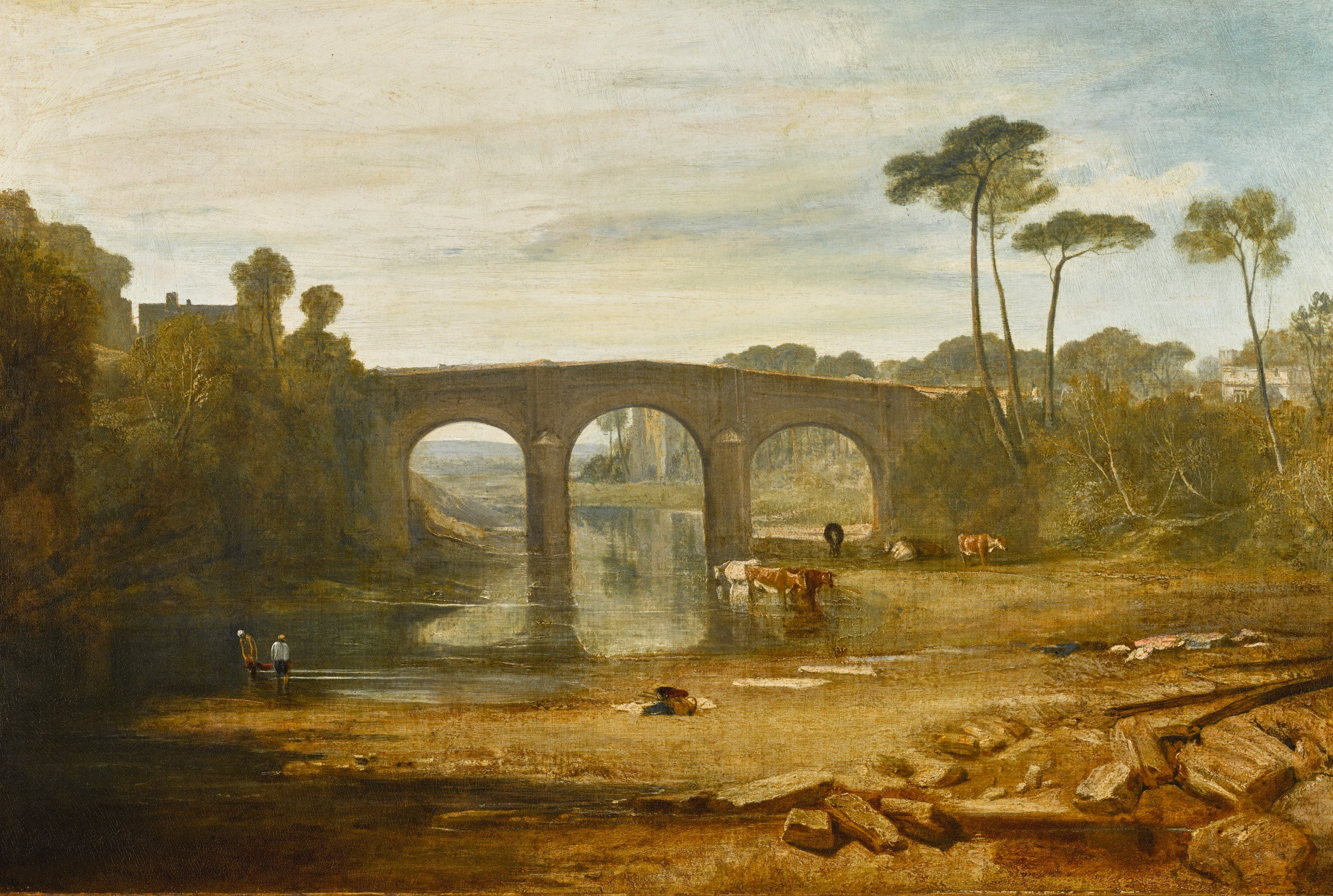
Whalley Bridge and Abbey by J. M. W. Turner

Dedham Vale by John Constable

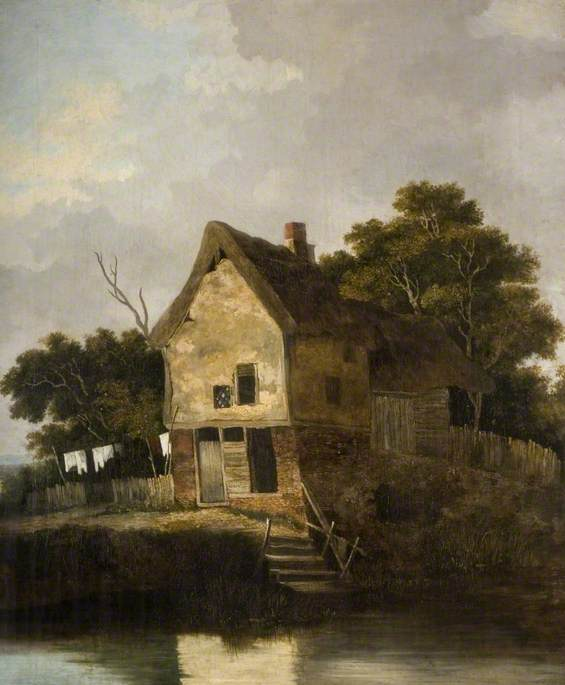
View at Blofield by John Crome

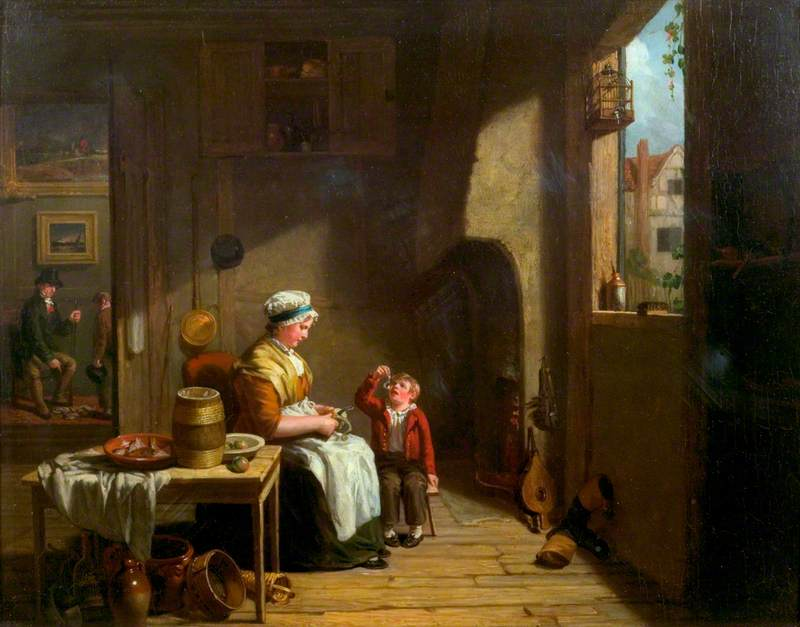
A Country Kitchen by William Collins

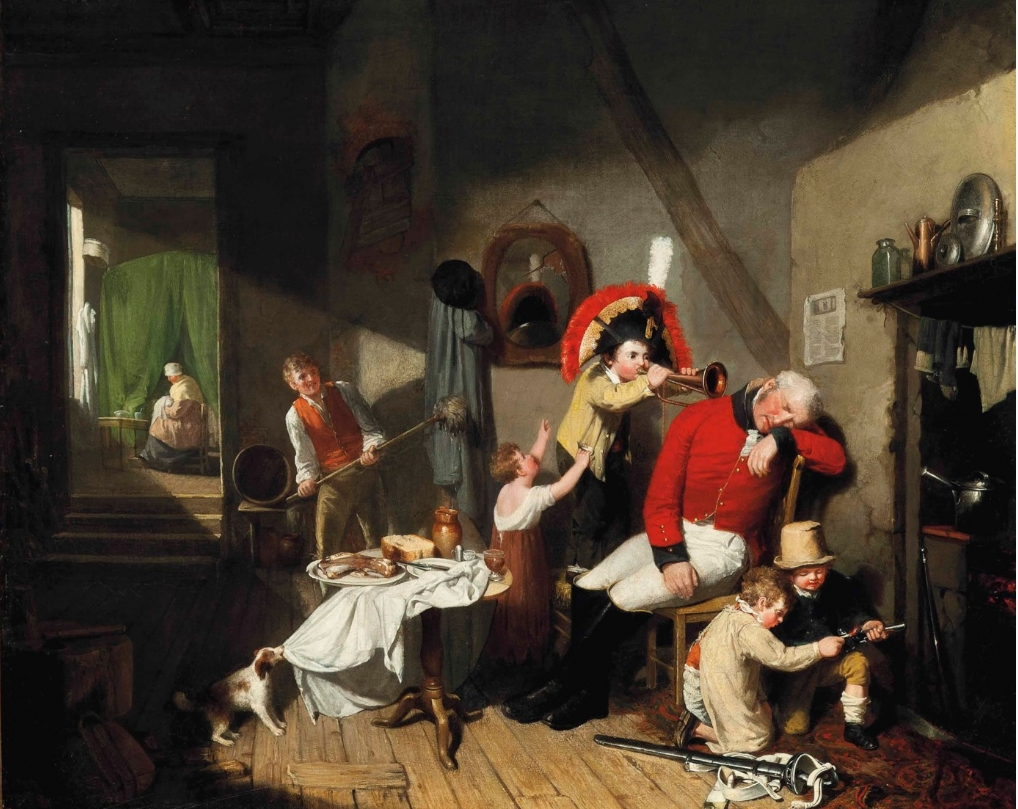
The Weary Trumpeter by William Collins

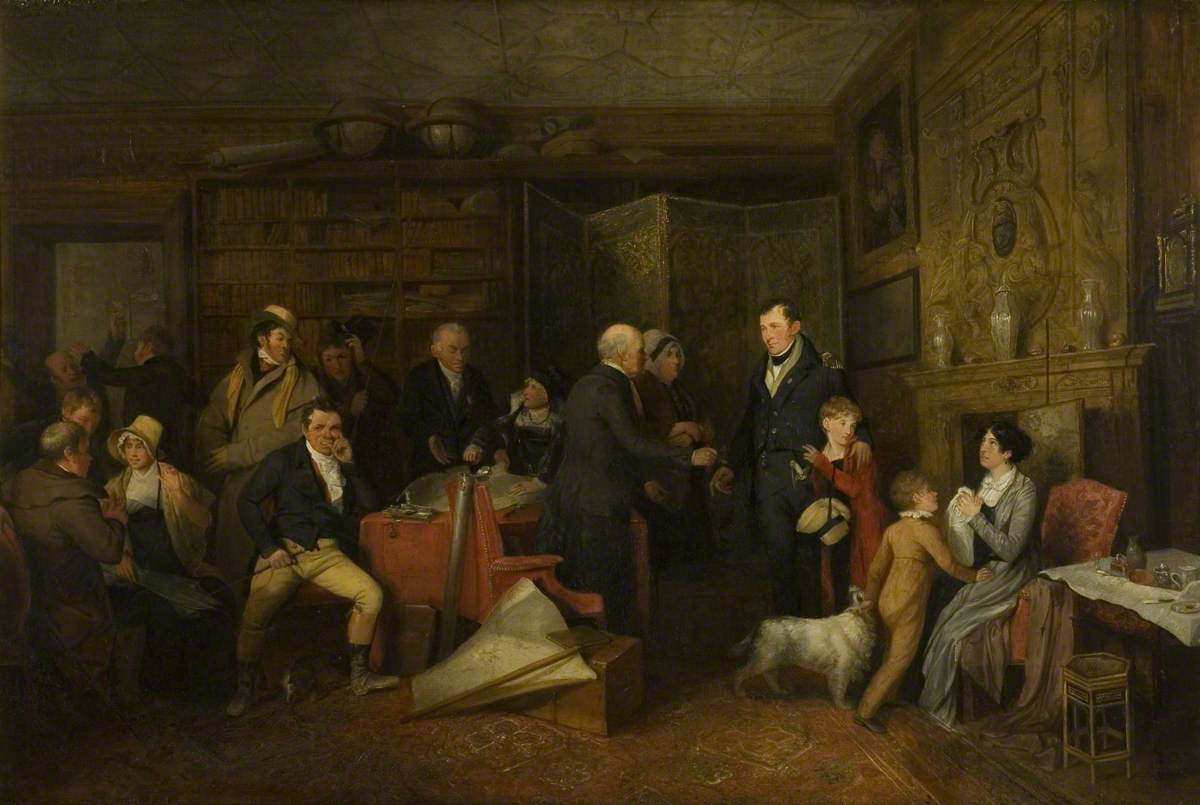
The Reading of the Will Concluded by Edward Bird

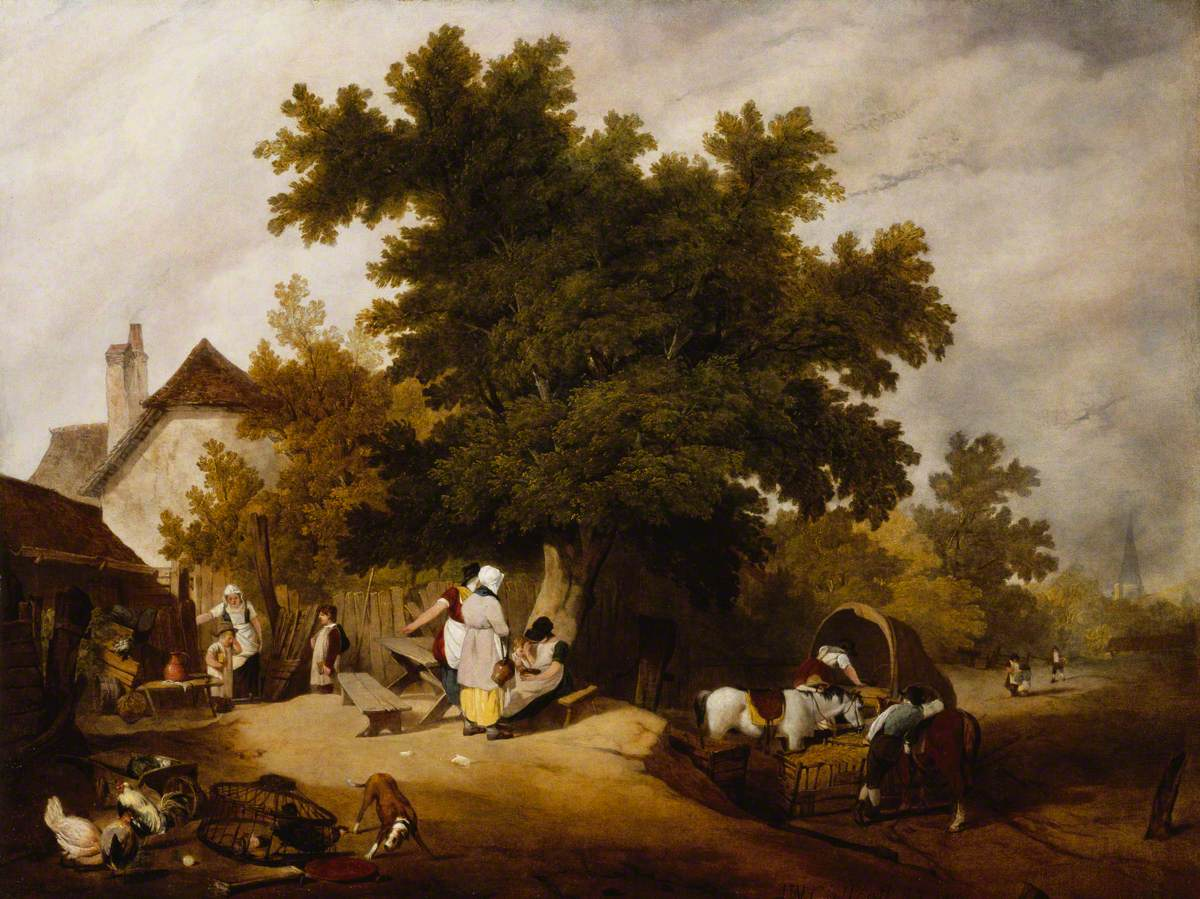
Morning by Augustus Wall Callcott

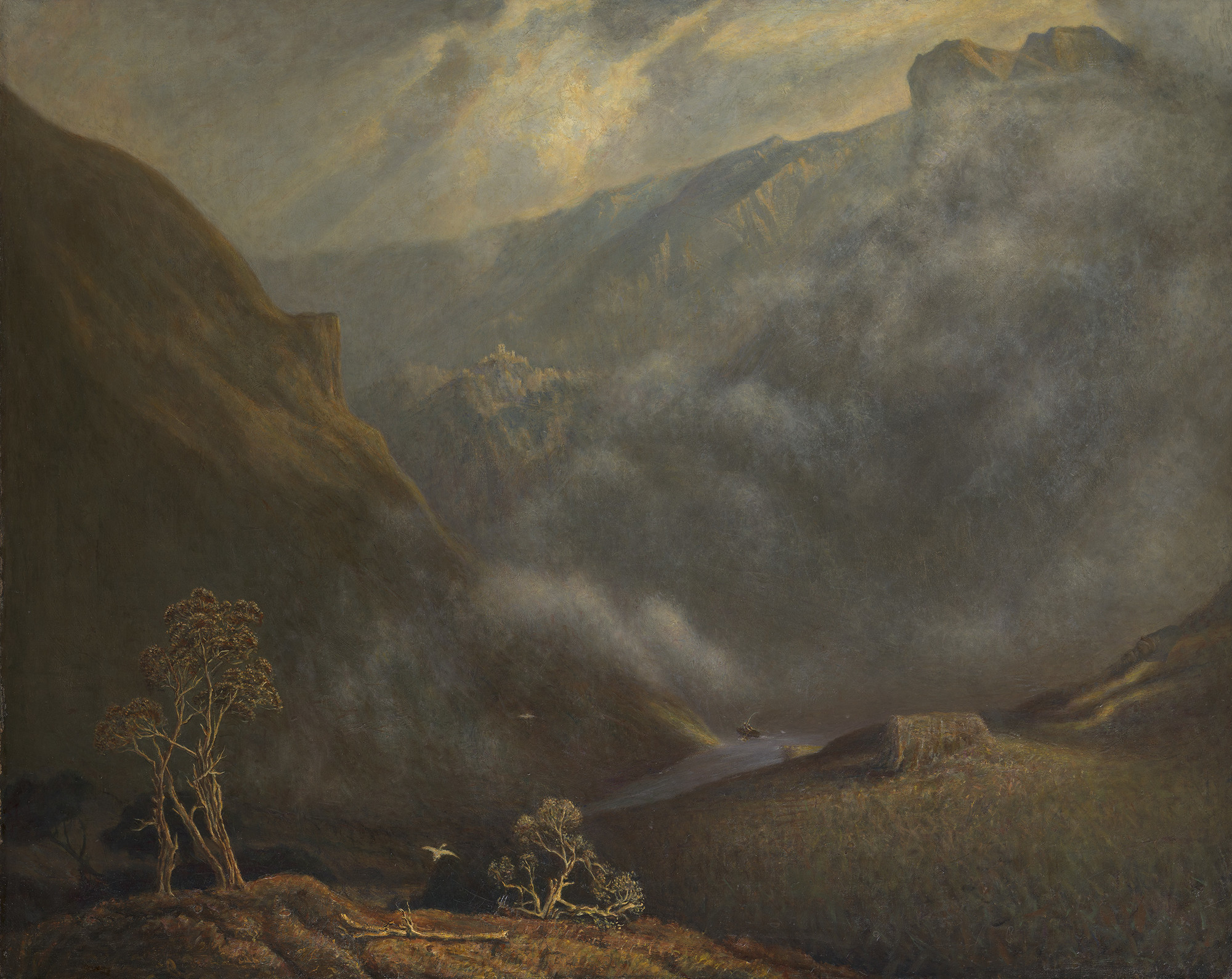
A Scene near Capel-Curig, North Wales by Augustus Wall Callcott

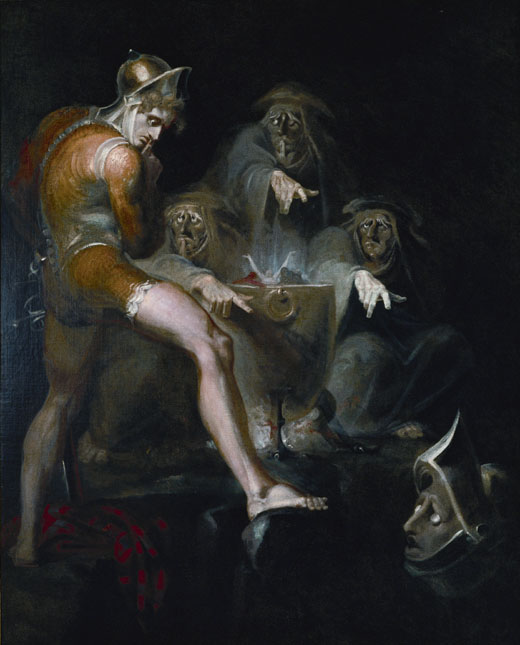
Macbeth Consulting the Vision of the Armed Head by Henry Fuseli

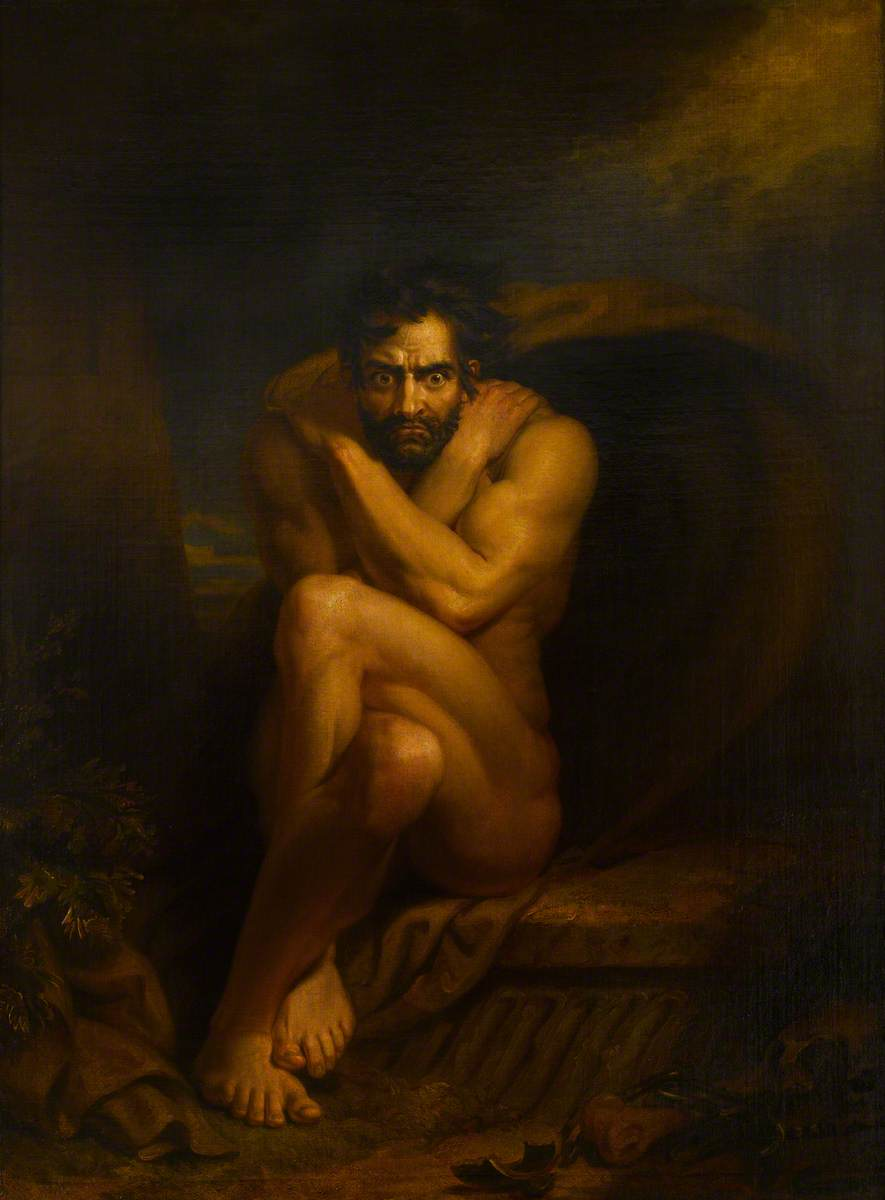
The Demoniac by George Dawe

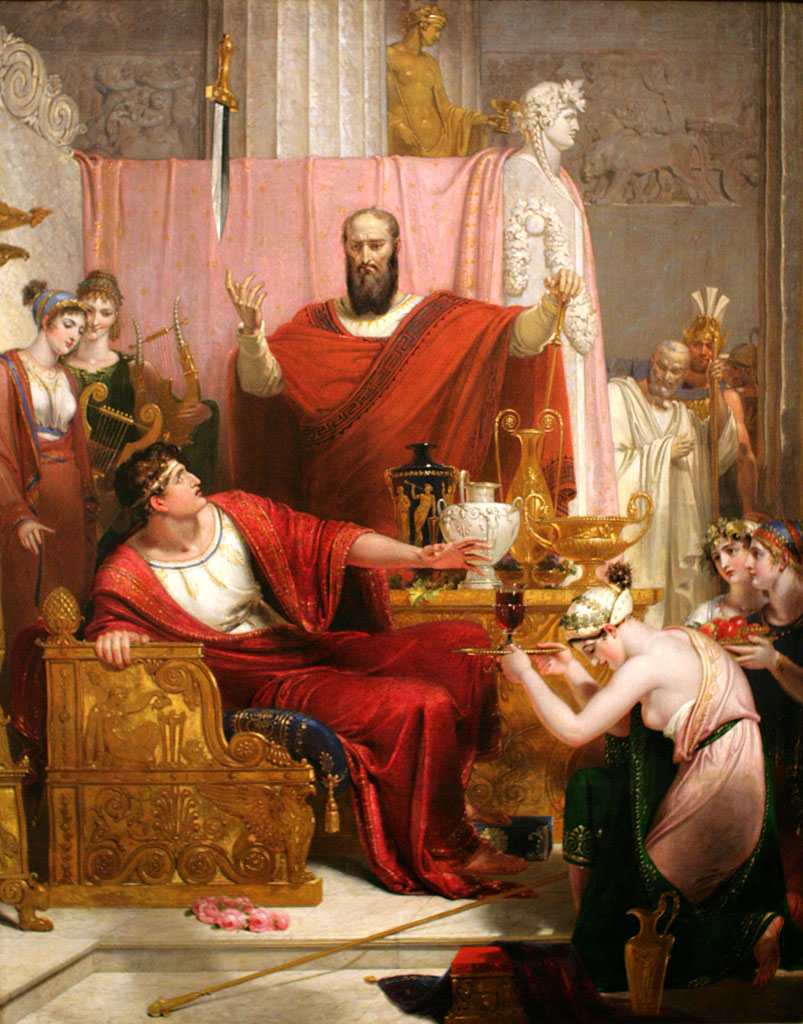
Damocles by Richard Westall

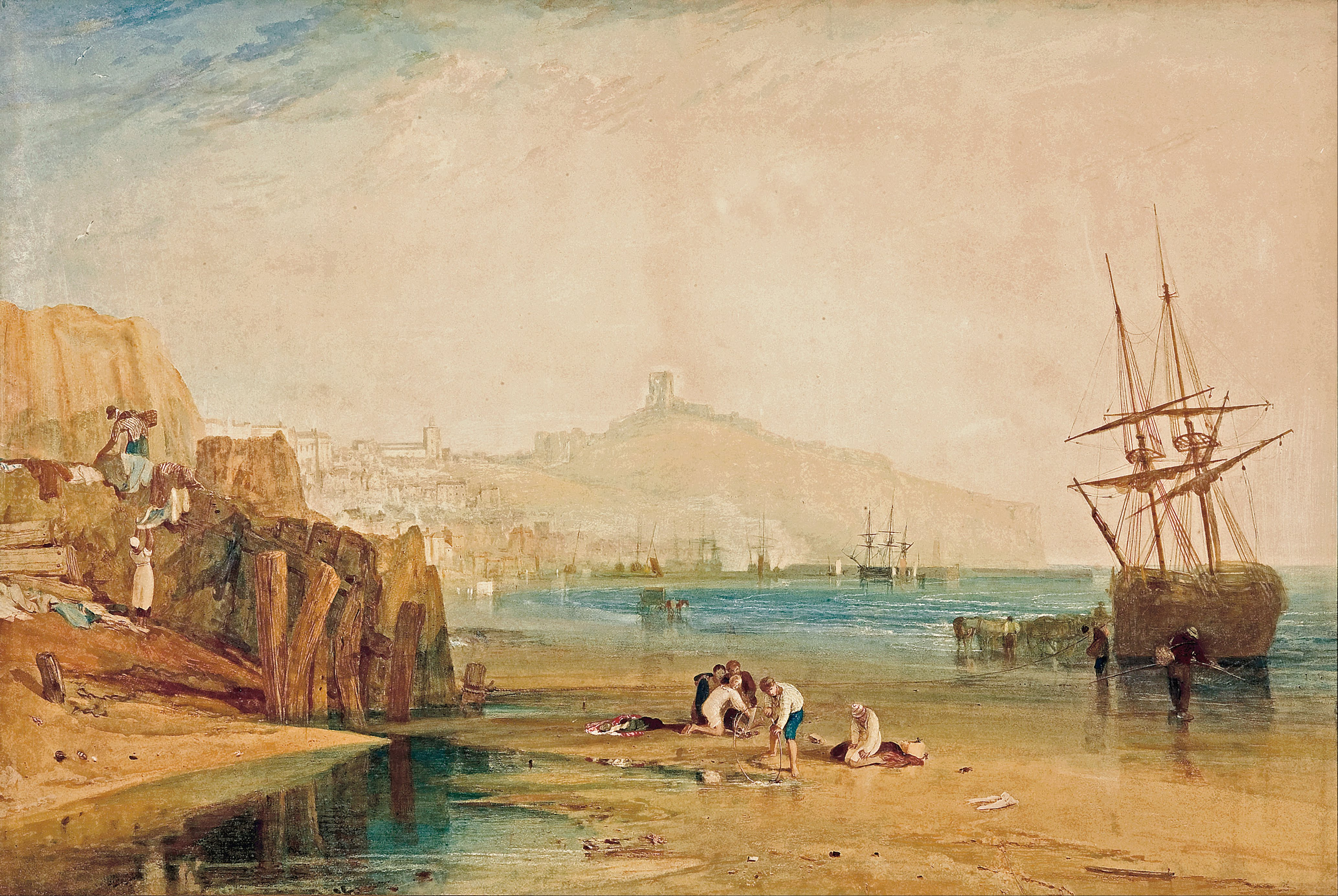
Scarborough Town and Castle by J. M. W. Turner

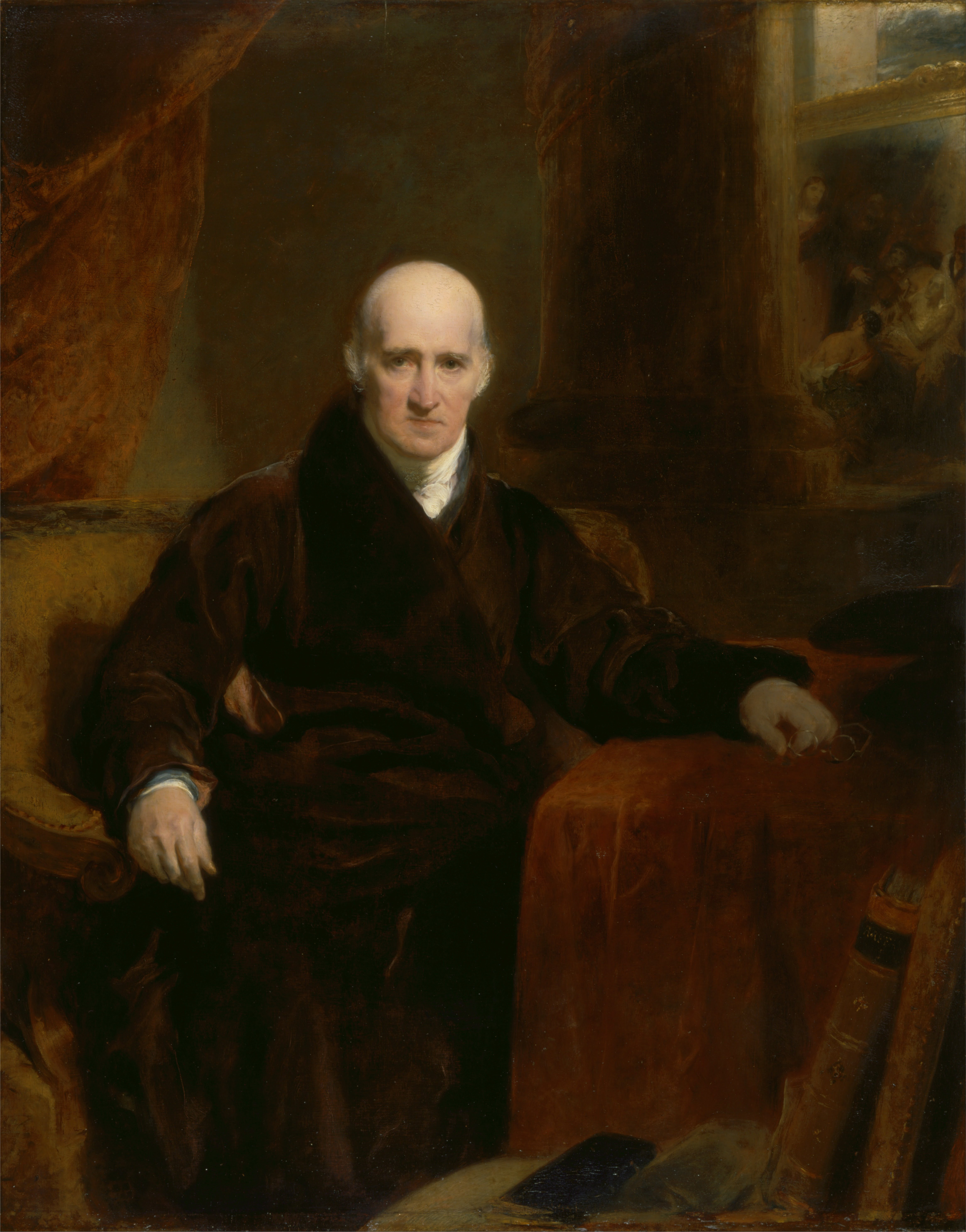
Portrait of Benjamin West by Thomas Lawrence

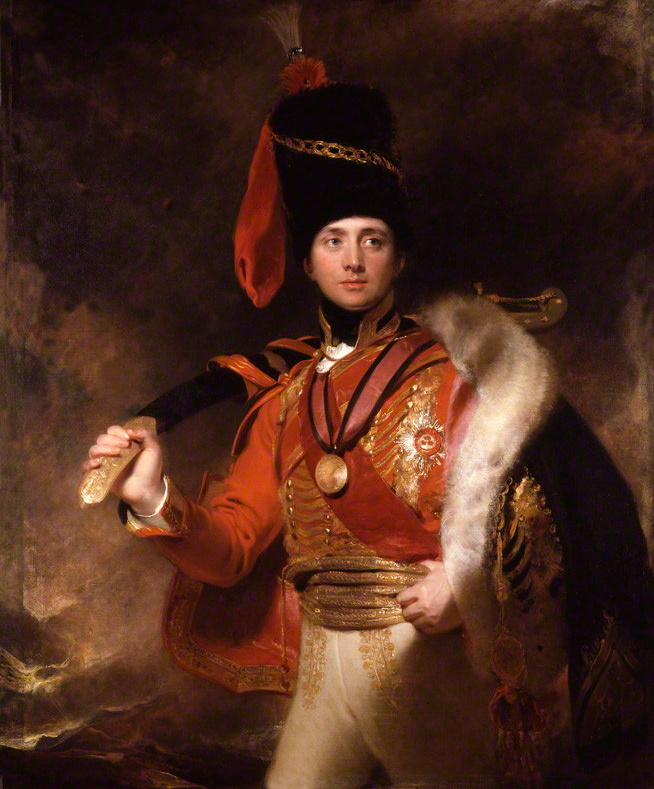
Portrait of Sir Charles Stewart by Thomas Lawrence. Uncertainty exists over whether this painting or a variation of it was the one displayed in 1811.

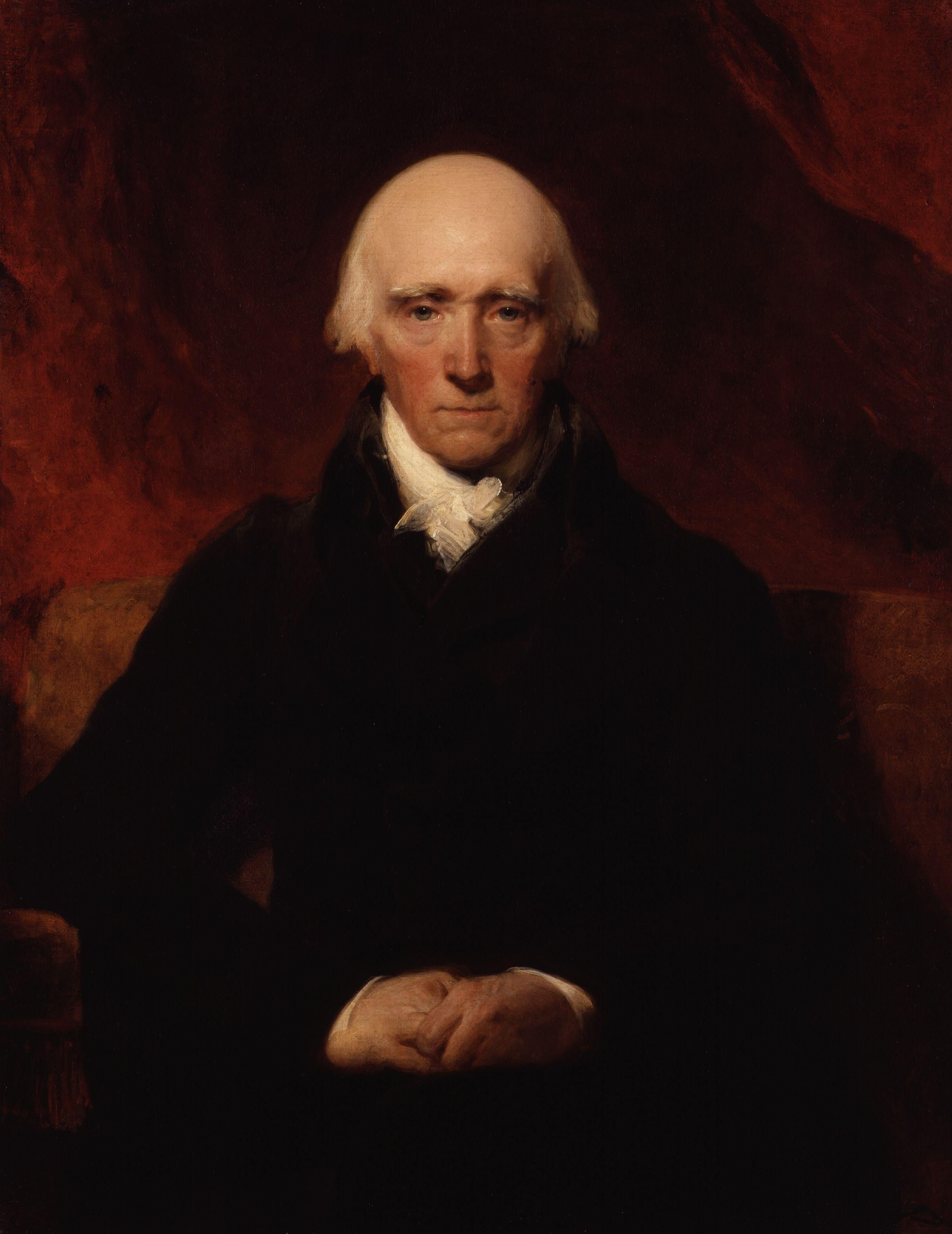
Warren Hastings by Thomas Lawrence

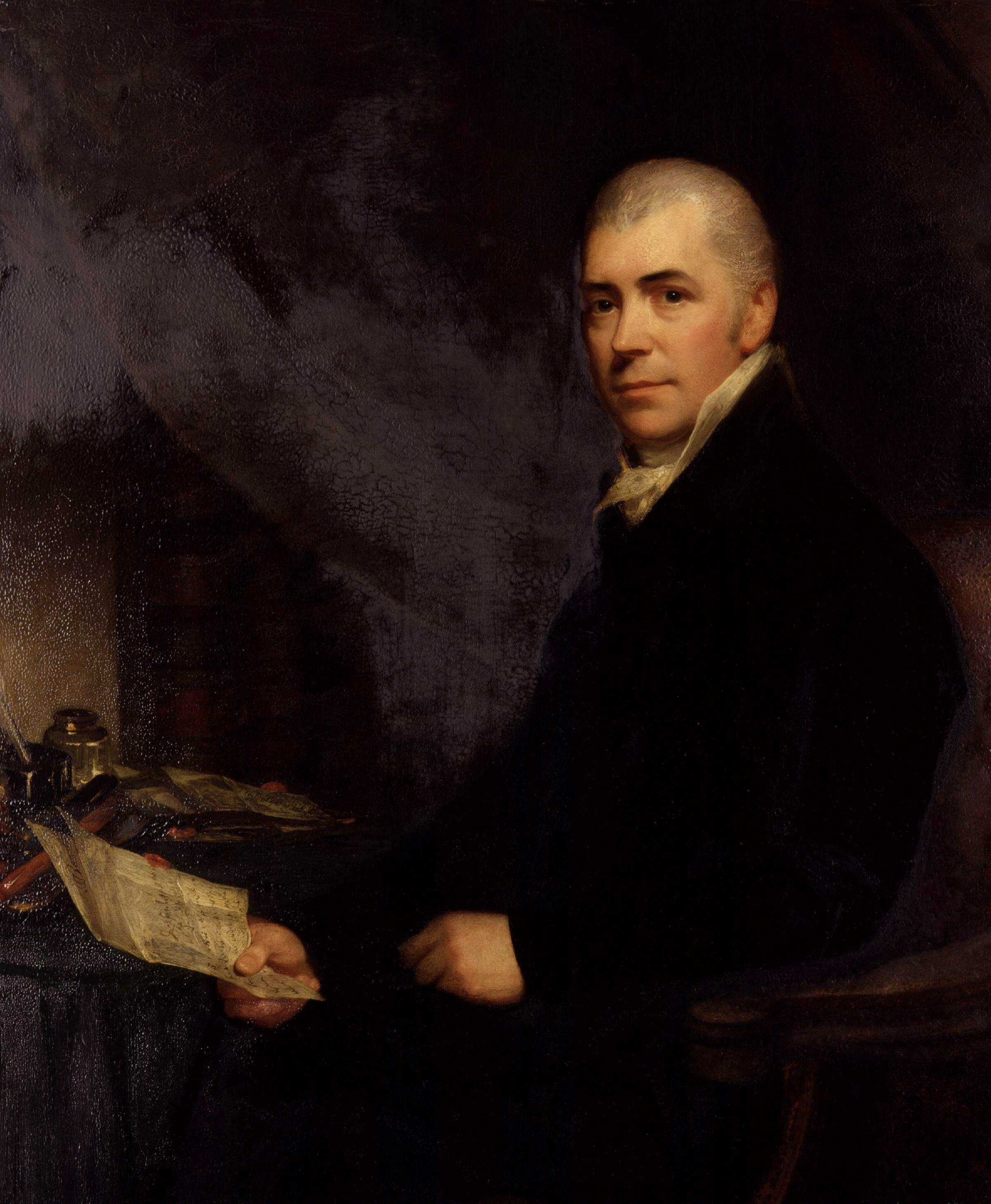
Henry Halford by William Beechey

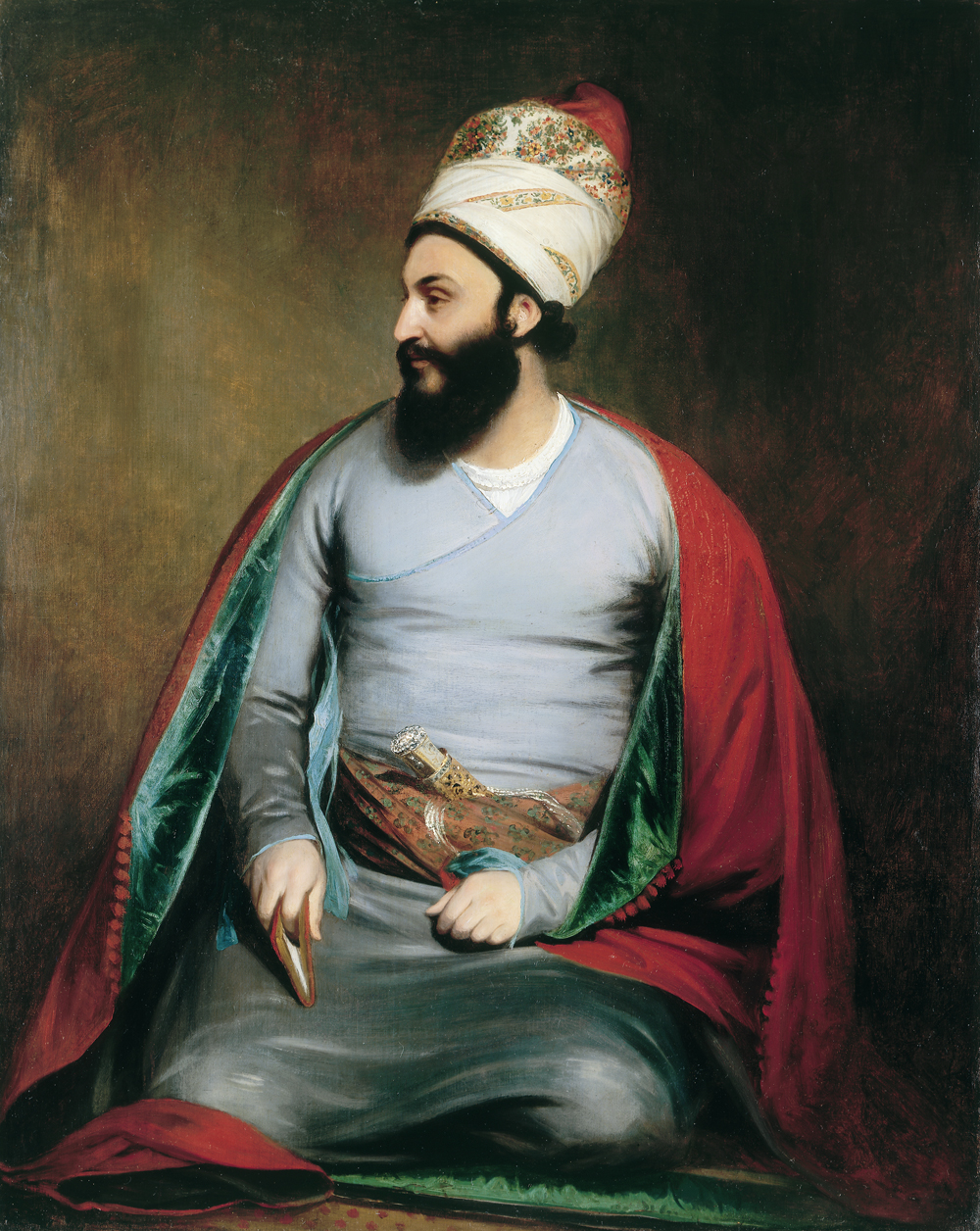
Mirza Abul Hasan by William Beechey

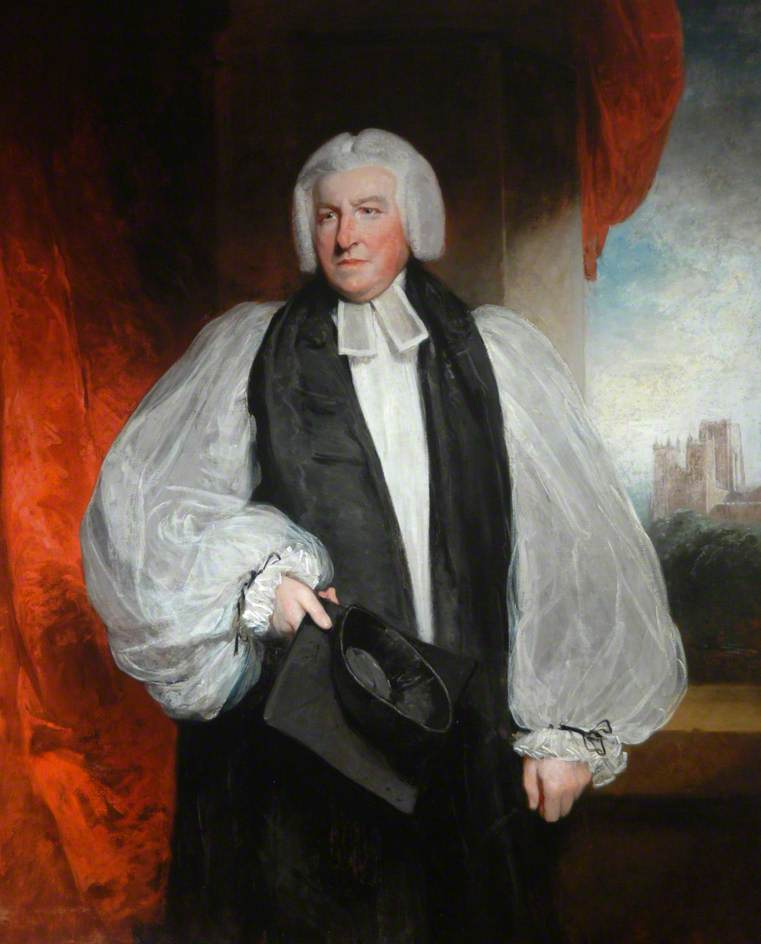
Shute Barrington by William Owen

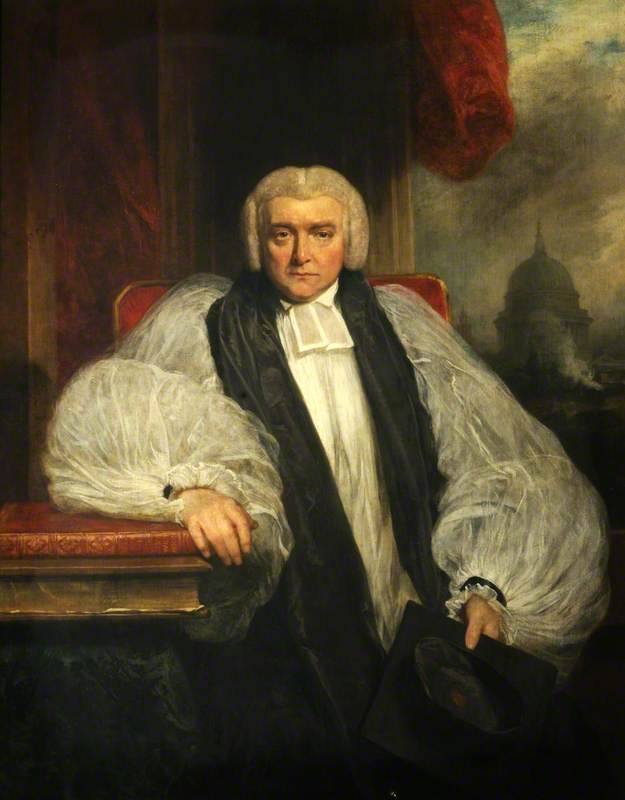
John Randolph by William Owen

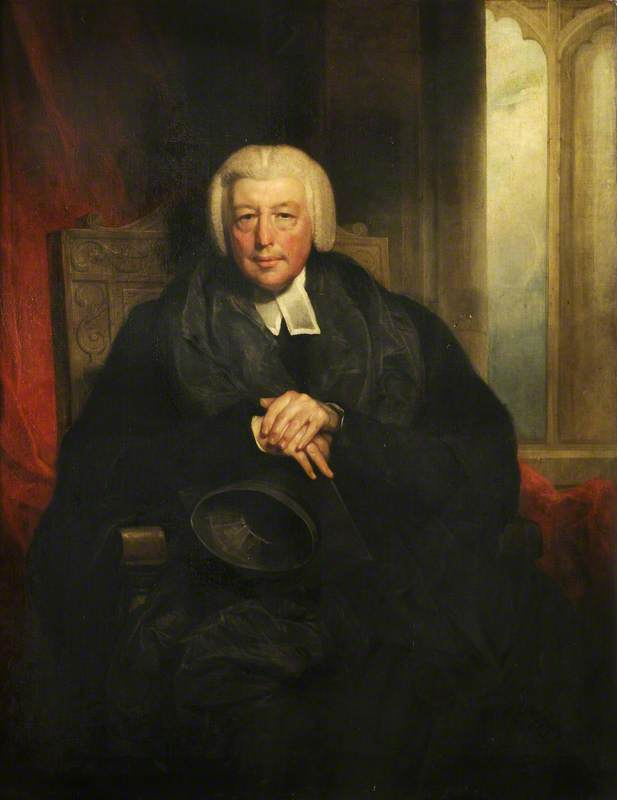
Cyril Jackson by William Owen

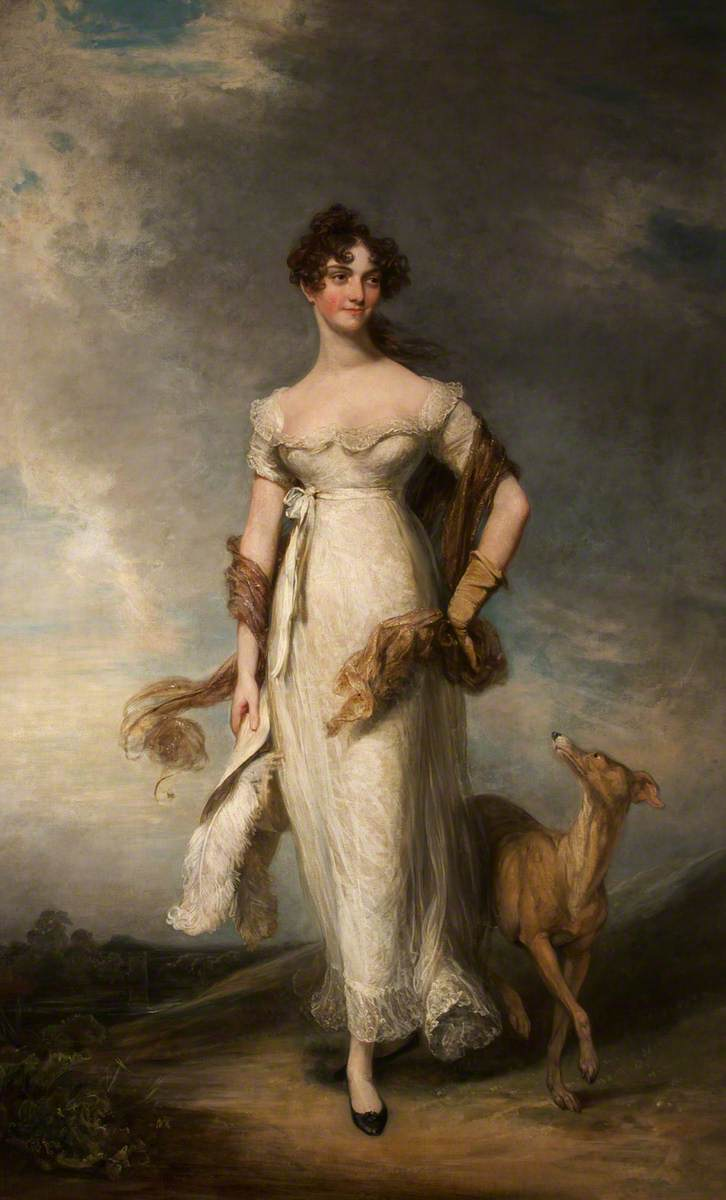
Lady Leicester by William Owen

Francis Burdett by James Northcote

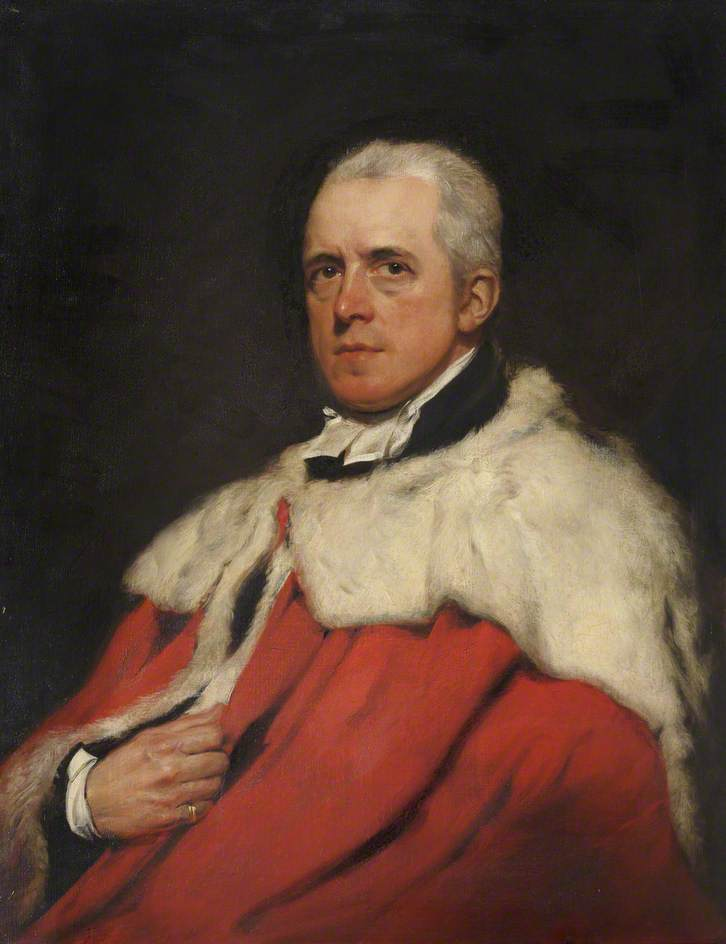
Richard Ramsden by Samuel Lane

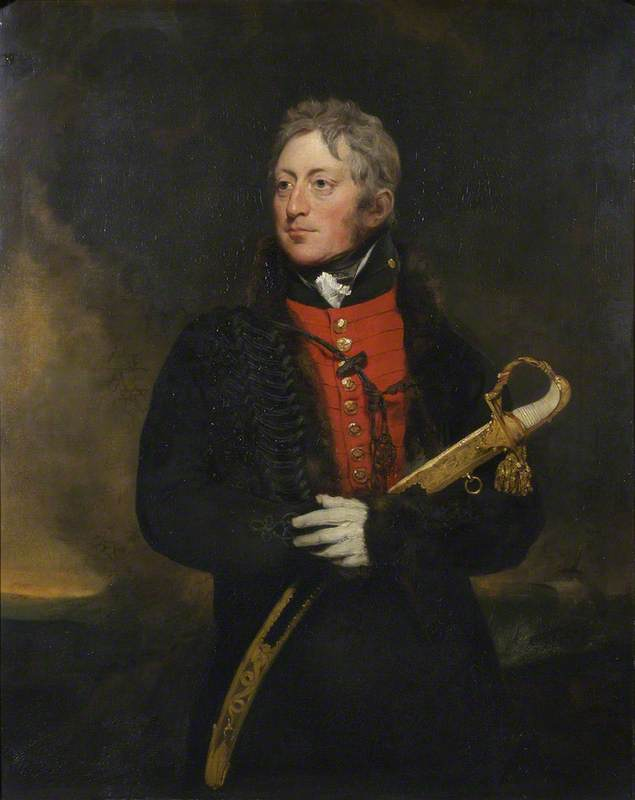
George Manby by Samuel Lane

== Bibliography ==
- Albinson, Cassandra, Funnell, Peter & Peltz, Lucy. Thomas Lawrence: Regency Power and Brilliance. Yale University Press, 2010.
- Bailey, Anthony. John Constable: A Kingdom of his Own. Random House, 2012.
- Bailey, Anthony. J.M.W. Turner: Standing in the Sun. Tate Enterprises Ltd, 2013.
- Hoock, Holger. Empires of the Imagination: Politics, War, and the Arts in the British World, 1750–1850. Profile Books, 2010.
- Levey, Michael. Sir Thomas Lawrence. Yale University Press, 2005.
- Reynolds, Graham. Constable's England. Metropolitan Museum of Art, 1983.
- Tromans, Nicholas. David Wilkie: The People's Painter. Edinburgh University Press, 2007.
