= Pierre Étienne Rémillieux =

French painter

Pierre Étienne Rémillieux (1811–1856) was a French painter.

Rémillieux was born in Vienne, Isère. He was a pupil of Claude Bonnefond and Augustin Thiérrat in the École nationale des beaux-arts de Lyon. He exhibited in the Salon de Paris (1841–1855), where he was awarded a third-class medal in 1841 and a second class one in 1847. He died in Lyon.

== Museums ==
- Lyon, Musée des Beaux-Arts, Groupe de fleurs dans une coupe de fleurs, Fleurs et fruits.
- Montpellier, Musée Fabre, Vase de Fleurs.

== Auctions ==
- Paris, 18 /12/ 1995, Enfant posant devant une balustrade et tenant un arc et une flèche, huile sur toile, 23,000 FF.
- New York, Sotheby's, 24 /10/ 1996 Poire, pêches et prunes sur un entablement, huile sur toile, $9200.

== Sources ==
- Gazette des Beaux-Arts, 1861, volume 10, 104, 165.
- Elisabeth Hardouin-Fugier et Etienne Graffe, Les Peintres de fleurs en France de Redouté à Redon, Les Éditions de l’amateur, Paris, 1992.
