= Baron Michelham =

Extinct barony in the Peerage of the United Kingdom

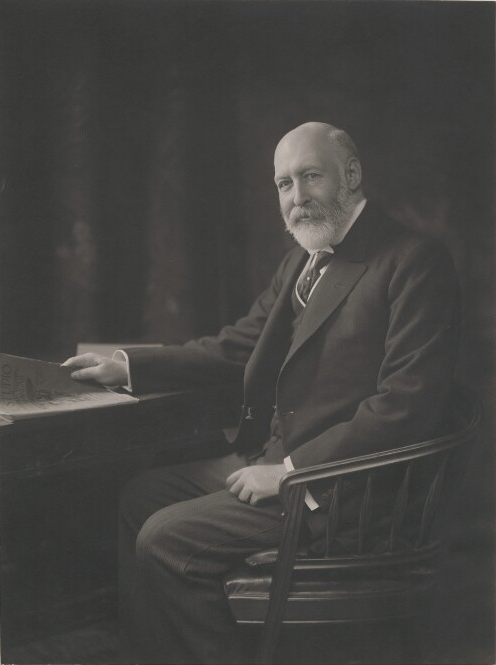
Herbert Stern (1851-1919), 1st Baron Michelham

Baron Michelham (verbally Lord) /mɪtʃ.ləm/, of Hellingly in the County of Sussex, was a title in the Peerage of the United Kingdom. It was created on 28 December 1905 for the banker, businessman and philanthropist Sir Herbert Stern, 1st Baronet. He was head of the firm Herbert Stern & Co. Stern had already been created a Baronet, of Strawberry Hill in the Parish of Twickenham and County of Middlesex, in the Baronetage of the United Kingdom on 31 July 1905. Apart from his British titles he was also a Baron in the Portuguese nobility, a title inherited from his father Baron Hermann de Stern. Lord Michelham was succeeded by his eldest son, the second Baron. His younger brother died before him and on his death in 1984 the titles became extinct.

The first Baron was the first cousin of Sydney Stern, 1st Baron Wandsworth, and Sir Edward Stern, 1st Baronet, of Fan Court, Chertsey (now Longcross/Lyne).

== Barons Michelham (1905) ==
- Herbert Stern, 1st Baron Michelham (1851–1919)
- Herman Alfred Stern, 2nd Baron Michelham (1900–1984)

== See also ==
- Stern baronets

Baronetage of the United Kingdom
| Preceded by Royden baronets | Stern baronets of Strawberry Hill; 31 July 1905 | Succeeded by Tritton baronets |
