= Durlacher =

Durlacher is a surname. Notable people with the surname include:

- Alfred Durlacher (1818–1869), Australian explorer
- Doris Durlacher (1870–1942), Australian nurse and midwife
- Elcan Durlacher (1817–1889), German translator and publisher
- Jessica Durlacher (born 1961), Dutch literary critic, columnist and novelist
- Laurence Durlacher (1904–1986), Royal Navy admiral
- Lewis Durlacher (1792–1864), surgeon-chiropodist to the British royal household
- Lindsey Durlacher (1974–2011), American Greco-Roman wrestler
- Ludwig Durlacher a.k.a. Louis Attila (1844–1924), German-born American strongman
- Montague Durlacher (1824–1894), who succeeded his father Lewis as chiropodist to the British royal household
- Patrick Durlacher (1903–1971), English cricketer
- Richard Durlacher (born 1932), Austrian racing cyclist
- Ruth Durlacher (1876–1946), Irish tennis player

== See also ==
- Durlacher House, in Laramie, Wyoming
