= Balls Pond Road Cemetery =

Cemetery in London

Balls Pond Road Cemetery (Kingsbury Road Cemetery)
- Grave of Simon Waley Waley at Balls Pond Road Cemetery
- Interactive map of Balls Pond Road Cemetery (Kingsbury Road Cemetery)

Details
- Established: 1843
- Closed: 1951
- Location: Kingsbury Road, Canonbury (London Borough of Islington)
- Country: England, United Kingdom
- Coordinates: 51°32′52″N 0°04′46″W
- Type: Jewish
- Owned by: West London Synagogue
- Size: 0.5 acres (0.20 ha)
- No. of graves: 900
- Find a Grave: Kingsbury Road Cemetery

Listed Building – Grade II
- Official name: West London Reform Cemetery
- Designated: 6 November 2020
- Reference no.: 1465187

Balls Pond Road Cemetery, also known as Jewish (West London Reform) Cemetery, Kingsbury Road Cemetery, Balls Pond Burial Ground and The Jewish Burial Ground, is a Jewish cemetery on Kingsbury Road, Canonbury, London N1. It was founded in 1843 and is owned by West London Synagogue. Prominent early members of that place of worship, such as the de Stern, Goldsmid and Mocatta families, are buried in this cemetery. Other notable burials include the ashes of Amy Levy, the first Jewish woman at Cambridge University and the first Jewish woman to be cremated in England. The last burial at the cemetery was in 1951. The cemetery has been Grade II listed since 2020.

== Notable burials ==
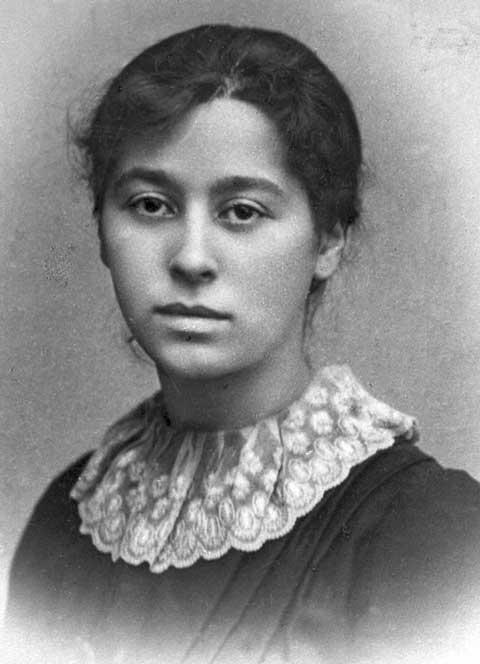
Amy Levy

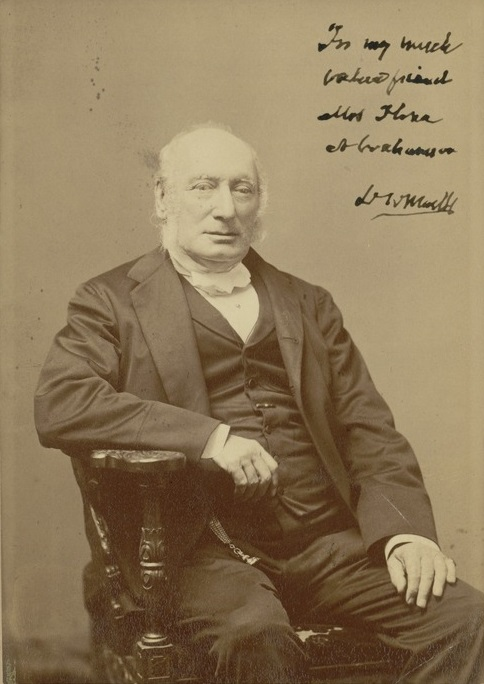
Reverend David Woolf Marks

People buried at the cemetery include:

- Phinehas Abraham (c.1812–1887), a West Indian merchant born in Jamaica and one of its largest landed proprietors. He was senior justice of the peace for Trelawny Parish in Jamaica and an agent of Lloyd's of London. He was also one of the earliest members of West London Synagogue.
- Montague Durlacher (1824–1894), who, in 1869, was appointed surgeon-chiropodist to Queen Victoria's household, in succession to his father Lewis Durlacher (c.1792–1864). Both men are buried at the cemetery, as is Lewis's wife Susannah (c.1798–1874) who was Montague's mother.
- Ney Elias (1844–1897), English explorer, geographer and diplomat, most known for his extensive travels in Asia. Modern scholars speculate that he was a key intelligence agent for Britain during the Great Game. Elias travelled extensively in the Karakoram, Hindu Kush, Pamirs and Turkestan regions of High Asia.
- Amy Levy (1861–1889), essayist, poet, and novelist, who was the second Jewish woman at Cambridge University and the first Jewish woman to be cremated in England; her ashes were interred at this cemetery
- Joseph Moses Levy (1812–1888), newspaper editor and publisher. He was chief proprietor of The Sunday Times and also managed The Daily Telegraph.
- Reverend Dr Albert Löwy (1816–1908), a Moravian-born Hebrew scholar and Reform rabbi
- Reverend David Woolf Marks (1811–1909), Hebrew scholar and minister, who was the first religious leader of the West London Synagogue
- Annette Salaman (1827–1879), writer, who compiled a collection of comforting scriptural texts which were published in 1873 as an illustrated guide to the Bible entitled Footsteps on the Way of Life. She was also the author of How to Earn a Good Name (1876) and Aunt Annette's Stories to Ada (1876), a series of tales for children.
- James Joseph Sylvester (1814–1897), mathematician and Savilian Professor of Geometry at the University of Oxford. Sylvester made fundamental contributions to matrix theory, invariant theory, number theory, partition theory and combinatorics. He played a leadership role in American mathematics in the second half of the 19th century as a professor at the Johns Hopkins University and as founder of the American Journal of Mathematics.
- Simon Waley (1827–1875), a leading broker on the London Stock Exchange and a prominent amateur musician. He was a leading figure in the Jewish community during the period of the emancipation of the Jews from civil disabilities.

=== Goldsmid family ===
- Sir Isaac Lyon Goldsmid, 1st Baronet (1778–1859), financier and one of the leading figures in the Jewish emancipation in the United Kingdom
- Frederick David Goldsmid (1812–1866), the second son of Sir Isaac Lyon Goldsmid and his wife Isabel, who was Member of Parliament (MP) for Honiton from 1865 to 1866. He is buried with his wife Caroline (1814–1885), daughter of Phillip Moses Samuel and Julia Goldsmid.
- Frederick's sister Rachel, Countess d'Avigdor (1816–1896), philanthropist and communal worker, who was the second daughter of Isabel and Sir Isaac Lyon Goldsmid
- Frederick and Caroline's son Sir Julian Goldsmid, 3rd Baronet (1838–1896), lawyer, businessman, and art collector. He became a Liberal (later Liberal Unionist) MP and Vice-Chancellor of the University of London.

=== Mocatta family ===
- David Mocatta (1806–1882), architect of railway stations and synagogues, and a founder of the West London Synagogue. He was elected a Fellow of the Institute of British Architects (later the RIBA) in 1836, and was an early member of its council.
- Frederick David Mocatta (1828–1905), financier and philanthropist.

=== Stern family ===
- David Jacob de Stern, Viscount de Stern, (1807–1877), German-born British banker and senior partner of the firm of Stern Brothers
- Herbert Stern, 1st Baron Michelham (1851–1919), financier, philanthropist and a member of the Stern banking family
- Hermann de Stern, Baron de Stern (1815–1887), German-born British banker and senior partner of the firm of Stern Brothers

== See also ==
- Jewish cemeteries in the London area
- Golders Green Jewish Cemetery
