= Stern baronets =

Set index for Stern baronets

There have been two baronetcies created for members of the Stern family, both in the Baronetage of the United Kingdom. Both creations are extinct.

- Stern baronets of Strawberry Hill (1905): see Baron Michelham
- Stern baronets of Chertsey (1922): see Sir Edward Stern, 1st Baronet (1854–1933)
