= Belleville Synagogue =

Synagogue in Paris, France

- Synagogue Belleville
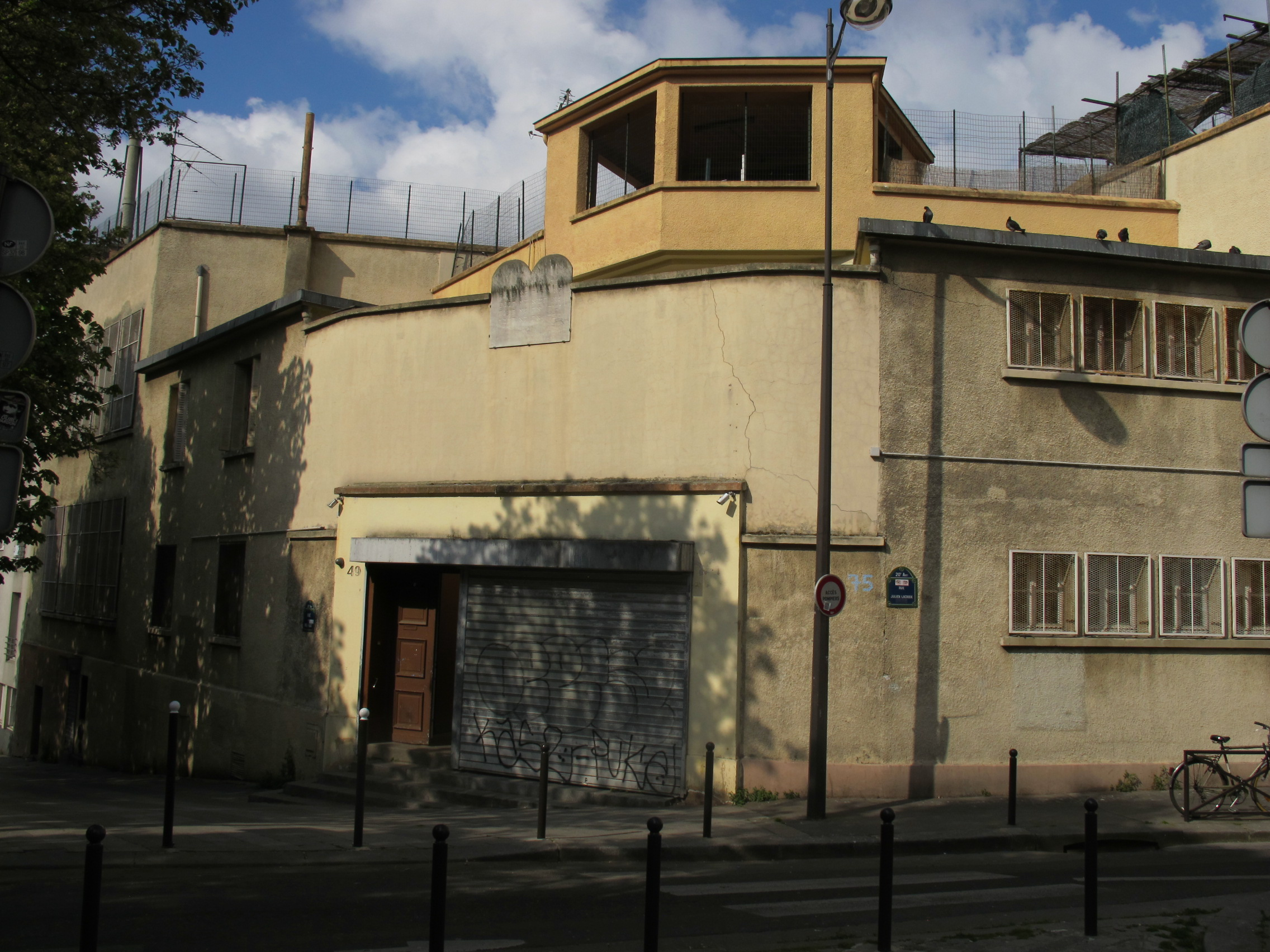

Religion
- Affiliation: Judaism
- Status: active

Location
- Location: 20th arrondissement, Paris, France
- Interactive map of Belleville Synagogue
- Coordinates: 48.87132°N 2.38294°E

Architecture
- Architects: Germain Debré and Lucien Hesse
- Type: Synagogue

The Belleville Synagogue (French: Synagogue de Belleville), also known as the Israelite Temple of Bellville (French: Temple Israélite de Belleville), located at 75 rue Julien-Lacroix and 49 rue de Pali-Kao, in the Belleville neighborhood of the 20th arrondissement of Paris, was built from 1925 to 1933 by the architects Germain Debré (1890–1948) and Lucien Hesse (1866–1929) of the Israelite Central Consistory of France.

== History ==
The synagogue was built from 1925 to 1933 by architects Germain Debré (1890–1948) and Lucien Hesse (1866–1929), both from the Israelite Central Consistory of France; it was funded by Edmond de Rothschild and intended for Jews from Eastern Europe in the neightborhood.
