= Edgard Stern =

French private banker (1854–1937)

Edgard-Salomon Stern (1 January 1854 – 20 April 1937) was a French banker and art collector.

== Biography ==
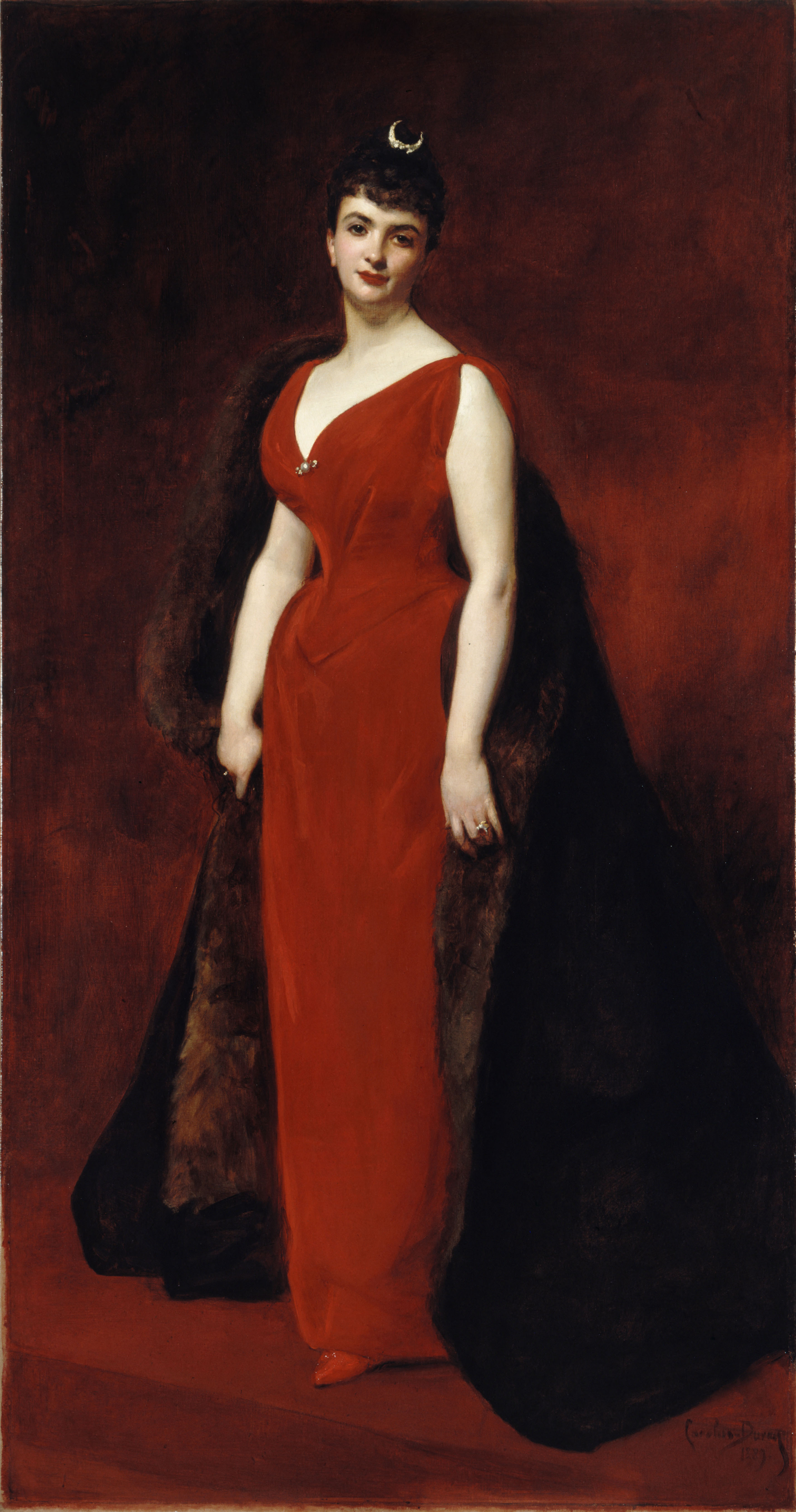
Portrait of Mme Edgard Stern, by Carolus-Duran (Musée des beaux-arts de la ville de Paris).

Stern was born in Paris, the son of Salomon Stern, a Frankfurt banker, and Johanne Ellissen, and nephew of Antoine Jacob Stern, Baron Hermann Stern and Viscount David de Stern, Edgard Stern joined Banque Stern in 1877, becoming a partner in 1888 and then head of the bank.

Stern was a director of Banque de Paris et des Pays-Bas (replacing his first cousin Jacques Stern, who co-founded the bank), Compagnie des chemins de fer andalous, Banca Commerciale Italiana, Banque d'Indochine, Ateliers et Chantiers de la Loire, Compagnie Générale des Eaux, Compagnie Générale des Eaux pour l'Etranger, Compagnie Générale du Gaz pour la France et l'Etranger, Compagnie des Sels Gemmes et Houillères de la Russie Méridionale and Brufina.

Stern built a private mansion at No. 20 avenue Montaigne in Paris, as well as the Château de Villette in Pont-Sainte-Maxence and collected art.

Stern was a Knight of the Legion of Honour and Commander of the Order of the Crown of Italy.

Stern married his cousin Marguerite Fould, daughter of businessman Henri Fould and Suzette Stern. They are the great grandparents of Édouard Stern and the parents-in-law of Marquis Bertrand de Sauvan d'Aramon.

Stern died in Paris on 20 April 1937 at the age of 84.

== Bibliography ==
- Bibliothèque Edgard Stern. Très beaux livres illustrés du XVIIIe s. Livres de fêtes. Reliures en maroquin aux armes. Dessins originaux. [Vente à Paris, Hôtel-Drouot, 27 juin 1988. Commissaires priseurs: Laurin, Guilloux, Buffetaud, Tailleur]., 1988
- Morphologie des Groupes Financiers, 1962
- Henry Coston, Le retour des "200 familles.", 1960

== See also ==
- Lombard Odier Darier Hentsch & Cie
- Banque Bénédict Hentsch & Cie SA
