= Hermann de Stern =

German-born British banker (1815–1887)

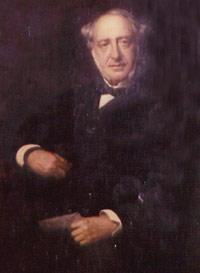
- Born: 1815; Frankfurt am Main, Grand Duchy of Frankfurt
- Died: October 20, 1887 (aged 71–72); London, England
- Occupation: Banker
- Spouse: Julia Goldsmid
- Children: Herbert Stern, 1st Baron Michelham
- Relatives: David de Stern (brother); Sydney Stern, 1st Baron Wandsworth (nephew); Sir David Lionel Goldsmid-Stern-Salomons, 2nd Bt (son-in-law)

Hermann de Stern, Baron de Stern (1815–1887) was a German-born British banker and senior partner of the firm of Stern Brothers.

== Early life and career ==
Stern was born in 1815 in Frankfurt am Main, Grand Duchy of Frankfurt, to the prominent Stern banking family. He moved to London in 1844 to join his brother David.

Together, they co-founded Stern Brothers, a financial institution based in London. According to The Jewish Encyclopedia, "Baron de Stern was principally connected with Portuguese finance, but he was prominently concerned also in floating the Danubian 7-per-cent loan of 1864, the Spanish mortgage loan, and the Italian tobacco-monopoly loan."

Stern served on the board of directors of the Imperial Bank, the Bank of Rumania, the London and San Francisco Bank, and the East London Waterworks Company. He also served on the board of directors of the London Banking Association.

In 1869, Stern received the Portuguese noble title of barão (baron) from King Luís I of Portugal.

== Personal life ==
Stern married Julia Goldsmid, daughter of Aaron Asher Goldsmid, brother of Sir Isaac Goldsmid. Their son was Herbert Stern, 1st Baron Michelham.

From 1883 to 1887, Stern was the owner of Strawberry Hill House in Twickenham, but he never lived there. He was associated with the Anglo-Jewish Association and the Jews' Free School.

Stern died in London on 20 October 1887 and was buried at Balls Pond Road Cemetery. One of the wealthiest British men of his time, he left an estate of £3,544,978 (equivalent to £0.49 billion in 2024).
