= Lucien Hesse =

French architect (1866–1929)

- Born: 10 April 1866; Paris, France
- Died: November 1929 (aged 63)
- Occupation: Architect
- Parent(s): Camille Anatole Hesse; Hermance Bernard

Lucien Hesse (10 April 1866 – November 1929) was a French architect. He designed synagogues and private residences, some of which are listed as official historical monuments by the French Ministry of Culture.

== Early life ==
Lucien Hesse was born on 10 April 1866 in Paris.

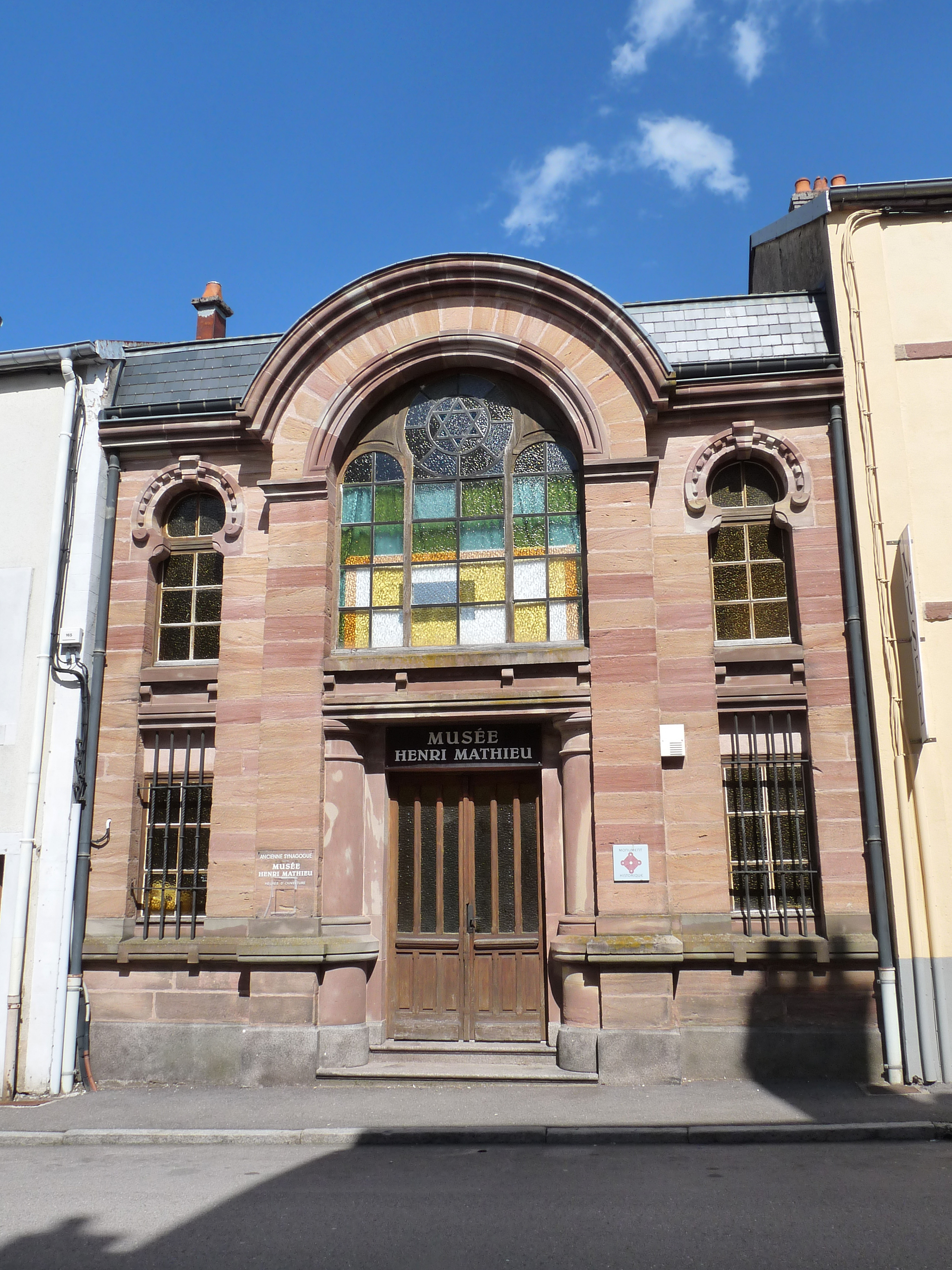
The synagogue in Bruyères.

== Career ==
Hesse designed several synagogues, including the one in Bruyères, Vosges in 1902–1903, and the one in Belleville, Paris in 1930. He also designed a Jewish school in Paris, the École Lucien-de-Hirsch. He designed the chapel of the Roussel family in the Neuilly-sur-Seine community cemetery in 1902.

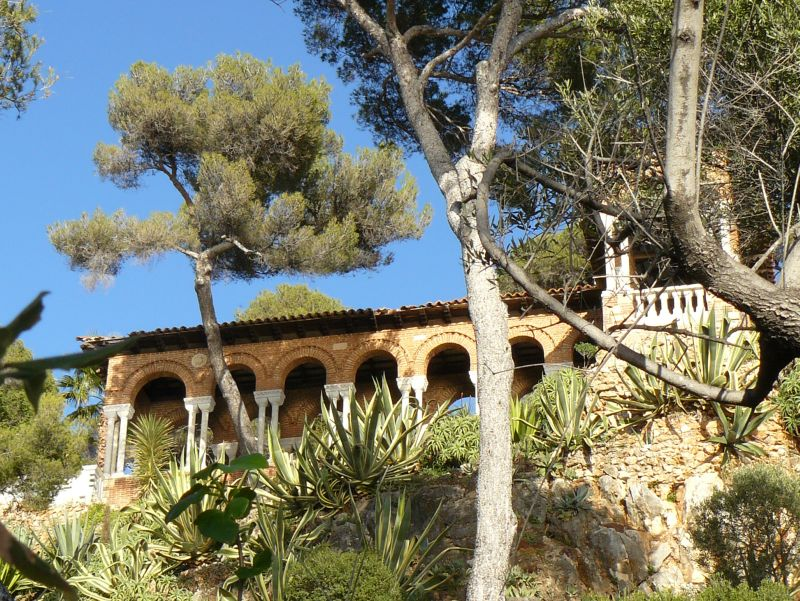
The Villa Torre Clementina in Roquebrune-Cap-Martin.

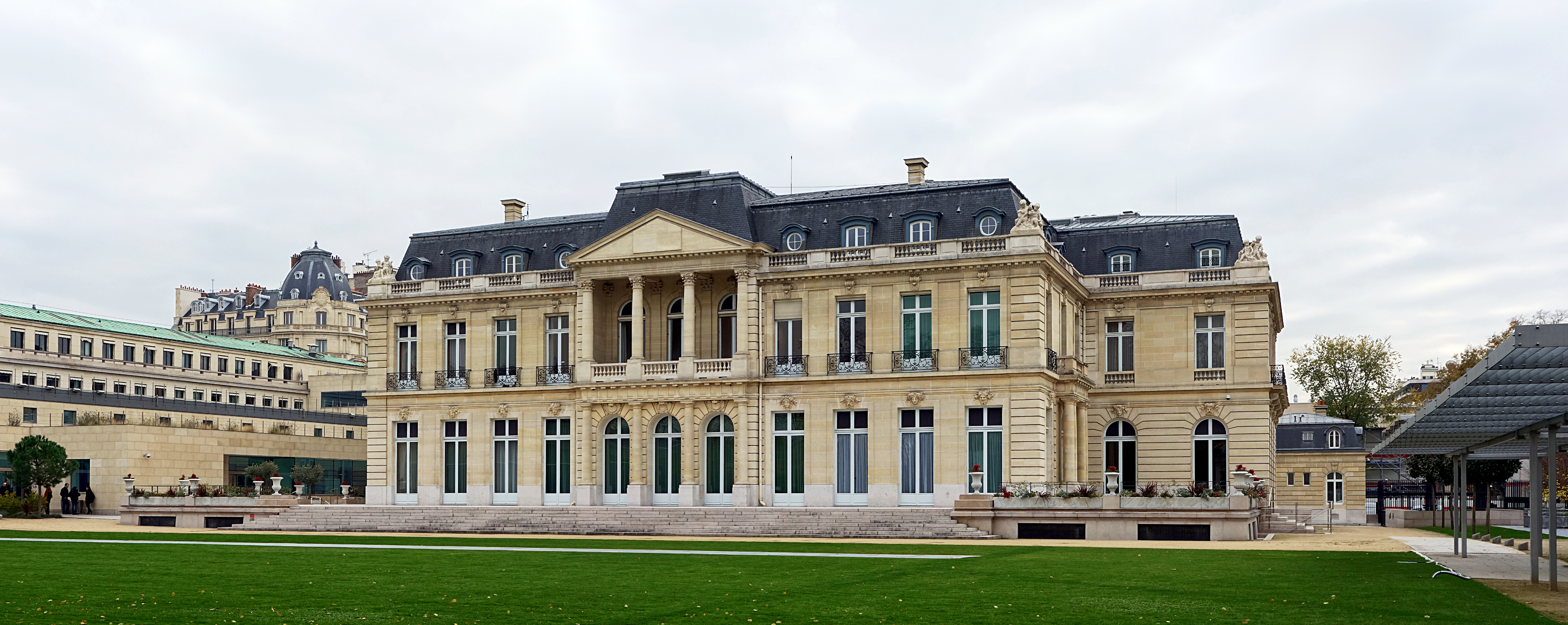
The Château de la Muette in Paris.

Hesse designed the Villa Torre Clementina in Roquebrune-Cap-Martin for Ernesta Stern in 1904. He designed the hôtel particulier at 10 bis Avenue Élysée-Reclus in Paris for Auguste Rateau. He also designed the third (and current) Château de la Muette for Baron Henri de Rothschild in 1914–1924; it is now the headquarters of the Organisation for Economic Co-operation and Development (OECD).

Hesse became a knight of the Legion of Honour in 1920.

== Death and legacy ==
Hesse died in November 1929. Some of his buildings are now listed as official historical monuments by the French Ministry of Culture.
