= Tuck baronets =

Baronetcy in the Baronetage of the United Kingdom

The Tuck baronetcy, of Park Crescent in Metropolitan Borough of St Marylebone, is a title in the Baronetage of the United Kingdom. It was created on 19 July 1910 for Adolph Tuck of Raphael Tuck & Sons Ltd., art publishers.

== Tuck baronets, of Park Crescent (1910) ==
- Sir Adolph Tuck, 1st Baronet (1854–1926)
  - m. 1882 Jeanetta Flatau (d. 1948)
- Major Sir (William) Reginald Tuck, 2nd Baronet (1883–1954)
  - m. 1917 Gladys Emily Kettle (née Nathan) (1893–1966)
- Sir Bruce Adolph Reginald Tuck, 3rd Baronet (1926–2020)
  - m. 1949 Frances Louise Renfro (1922–2002) Dissolved 1964
  - m. 1968 Pamela Dorothy Nicholson
- Sir Christopher John Tuck, 4th Baronet (b. 1954), who has a daughter.
  - m. 2007 Leslie J. Overton (b. ca. 1970)
  - m. 2015 Kimberly Coats (b. ca. 1962)

== Extended family ==
The 1st Baronet's father Raphael Tuck (1821–1900) was by birth a German Jew and emigrated to the United Kingdom as a young man, with his wife Ernestine and family. He was an art publisher.

== Notes ==
Baronetage of the United Kingdom
Preceded by Meyer baronets	Tuck baronets of Park Crescent; 19 July 1910	Succeeded by Ebrahim baronets
