= Édouard Stern =

French banker and murder victim (1954–2005)

- Born: 18 October 1954; Paris, France
- Died: 28 February 2005 (aged 50); Geneva, Switzerland
- Education: ESSEC Business School
- Occupation: Banker
- Notable work: Bank Stern
- Spouse: Béatrice David-Weill (m. 1983; div. 1998)
- Children: 3
- Relatives: Michel David-Weill (father-in-law)
- Family: Stern family

Édouard Stern (18 October 1954 – 28 February 2005) was a French banker who was infamously murdered in Geneva, Switzerland, by a woman he had a four-year relationship with. At the time of his death, he was the 38th richest French citizen.

== Biography ==
=== Early life ===
Édouard Stern was born in 1954 to one of France's wealthiest families, the owners of the private investment house Banque Stern. His father, Antoine Jean Stern, is a descendant of the Stern family of bankers, who came to prominence in 19th-century Frankfurt, and his mother was Christiane Laroche, former wife of French journalist and politician Jean-Jacques Servan-Schreiber. He was the great grandson of Edgard Stern.

Keen to follow in his father's footsteps, Stern graduated from the ESSEC Business School in Paris with a degree in finance before joining the family's private investment house in 1977.

=== Career ===
Aged 22, Stern took the reins of Banque Stern with a clear mandate to revitalize the nearly bankrupt institution. During the 1980s, he revamped the bank, expanding its activity in financial markets, as well as in mergers and acquisitions. In 1985, Stern sold the bank for 300 million francs to Lebanese investors. Thanks to a clause attached to the contract, he retained the copyright over his surname. Immediately after the sale went through, he started a new bank, with a similar name and business profile, drawing in many of his former clients. He sold this second institution in 1988 for an estimated 1.75 billion francs, to the Swiss Bank Corporation (SBS, which would later merge with UBS to form UBS S.A.). As a result of these transactions, Stern moved up the ranks of the richest families in France, occupying the 38th spot, according to Forbes.

In 1992, he joined Lazard Frères as managing partner and quickly became one of the firm's star bankers and heir-apparent. He tried to reduce overheads and bring in younger partners, but clashed with Michel David-Weill, the bank's head and his father-in-law. He quit Lazard Frères in 1997 and set up his own investment fund, Investment Real Returns (IRR). He owned half, with the remainder held by Eurazeo, a Lazard holding company and Mainz Holdings Ltd., a U.S. Virgin Islands firm that Stern wholly owned. He maintained cordial relations with David-Weill, who invested $300 million in IRR.

In 2000, Stern bought shares in the London-based Delta PLC, an international engineering group that was revising its corporate strategy. His stake eventually increased to 26% and after applying considerable pressure, he was named non-executive chairman on 31 December 2003. In October 2003, Stern sued Rhodia, alleging false accounting and insider dealing. After Stern's death, Delta was taken over by the US company, Valmont.

During his almost three decade long career, Stern amassed a fortune of more than a $1 billion through a series of "often brilliant business deals". His banking style was considered revolutionary for France's so-called "cozy capitalism", as he honed his skill at engineering hostile takeovers.

=== Death ===
On 28 February 2005, Stern was found dead in his apartment in Geneva, having been shot four times. His death was investigated as a homicide. The case attracted significant media attention due to the circumstances surrounding his death and his personal life. Swiss authorities arrested his long-time lover, Cécile Brossard, and charged her with Stern's murder. Brossard was convicted, and on 18 June 2009 was sentenced to eight years and six months in prison. In addition, the Swiss court ordered her to pay Stern's children one Swiss franc for "moral damage".

Brossard was freed on parole in November 2010, after spending five years in detention (including four years while awaiting trial. In 2013, she spoke about the murder for the first time since the trial, saying that she "eternally regrets" her actions and missed Stern, who she said had "a lovely and luminous personality".

The French film "Une Histoire d'Amour'' (entitled Tied in English) is based on the story. The story also inspired Olivier Assayas' 2008 film Boarding Gate. Stern's death was parodied on the FX animated series Archer in the third season episode "Lo Scandalo".

=== Personal life ===
In 1983, Édouard Stern married Béatrice David-Weill, daughter of Michel David-Weill, then president of Lazard Frères. The couple divorced in 1998. Stern had three children: Mathilde, Louis, and Henri. In 1997, Stern became romantically linked to Julia Lemigova, former Miss USSR 1990. In 2001, Stern became involved with Cecile Brossard.

Stern was known for his eccentric life style. He was very close to former French President Nicolas Sarkozy.
