= Phinehas Abraham =

West Indian merchant

Phinehas Abraham (1813—19 February 1887) was a West Indian merchant notable for being a justice of the peace for Trelawny Parish, Jamaica.

== Biography ==
Abraham was born in 1813. According to one source, he was born on the island of Jamaica, according to his gravestone, he was born in Portsmouth, Hampshire in England.

Abraham was one of the last survivors of the body of West Indian merchants who contributed a high degree to the prosperity of the West Indian colonial possessions. In former years, Abraham was one of the largest landed proprietors in the island of Jamaica. He held various offices outside the Jewish community. He was senior justice of the peace for the parish of Trelawny in Jamaica, an agent of Lloyd's of London and the last surviving captain in the Trelawny militia. He was also one of the earliest members of West London Synagogue.

Abraham was married to Caroline Simon (1822—27 March 1875) who was born on Jamaica. Together, the couple had 8 children:

- Alice Miriam (1845 in Jamaica—August 2, 1861 in Worthing, England)
- Phineas (born 1847 in Jamaica)
- Ella S (born 1849 in Jamaica)
- Frank A (born 1850 in Jamaica)
- John F (born 1852 in Jamaica)
- Frederick (born 1854 in Middlesex)
- Alfred D (born 1855 in Middlesex)
- Caroline (born 1855 in Middlesex)

According to his gravestone, Abraham died on February 21st, 1887; according to The Jewish Encyclopedia, he died on February 19, 1887. Regardless, Abraham was buried, along with his other deceased family, at Balls Pond Road Jewish Cemetery in London on February 24, 1887. He was 75 years old.
