= Villa Torre Clementina =

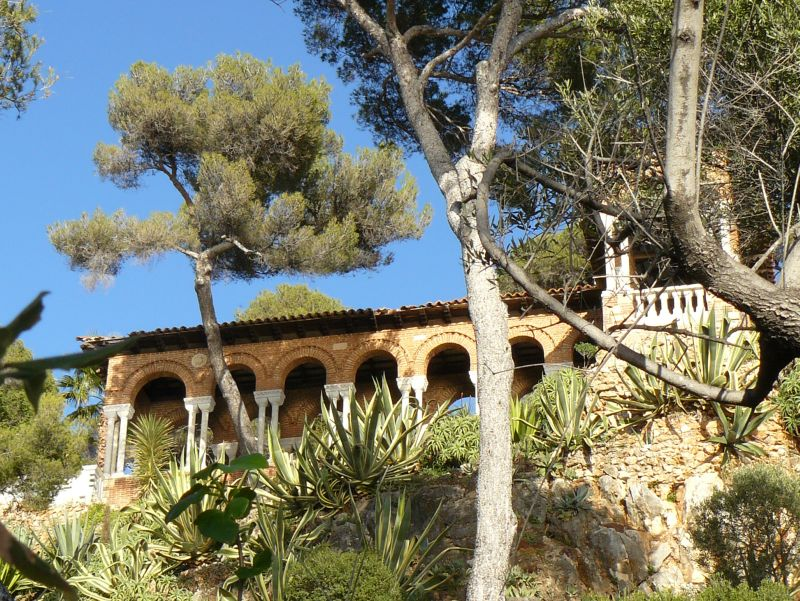
- The Villa Torre Clementina in 2008
- Interactive map of the Villa Torre Clementina area

General information
- Type: House
- Location: avenue Impératrice-Eugénie, Roquebrune-Cap-Martin, France
- Coordinates: 43.7532°N 7.4736°E
- Completed: 1904
- Client: Ernesta Stern

Design and construction
- Architect: Lucien Hesse

The Villa Torre Clementina is a historic mansion in Roquebrune-Cap-Martin, France. It was built in 1904 for author Ernesta Stern. It was designed by architect Lucien Hesse, and the interiors were designed by painter Raffaële Maïnella. It was used as a shooting location for the 1964 film Joy House. It has been listed as an official historical monument by the French Ministry of Culture since 1991.
