= Marguerite Fould =

French Jewish art collector

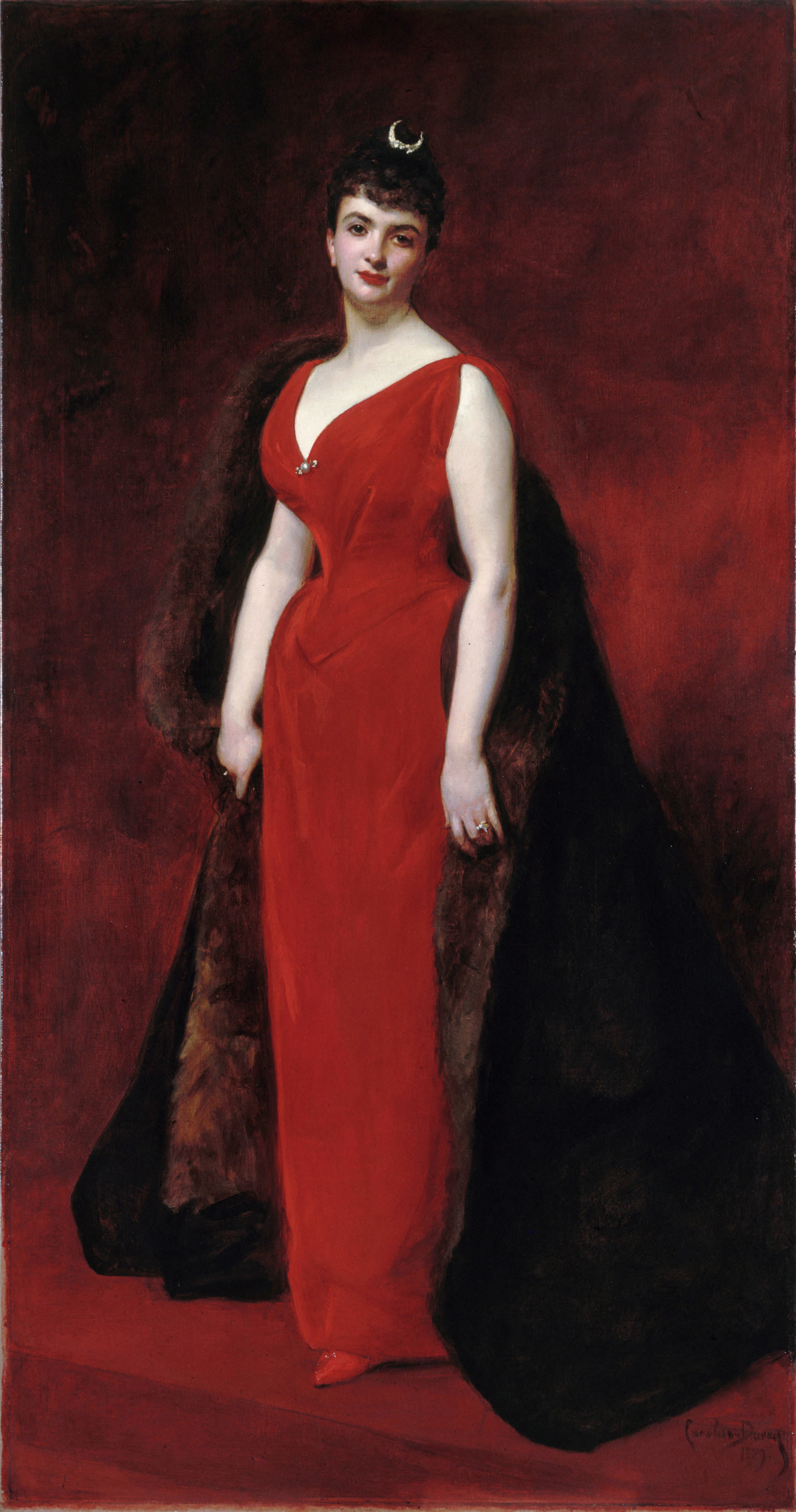
Marguerite Stern

Marguerite Stern (née Fould) (1866–1956) was a French Jewish art collector whose property was seized by Nazis during the occupation of Paris.

== Family life ==
Born in 1866 into the French Jewish bourgeoisie as the daughter of Henri Fould and Suzette Stern, Fould married into the Stern banking dynasty of which her husband Edgard Stern (1854–1937) was part.

== Art collecting and the Nazi era ==
During the occupation of France by Nazi Germany, the Stern and Fould families were persecuted unter antisemitic laws due to their Jewish origins. Their property, including artworks, was looted.

== Restitution ==
After the war, some of the artworks were restituted. However others were returned to France but instead of being returned to Fould-Stern, entered France's national MNR inventories. In 2020 France's Minister of Culture, Roselyne Bachelot-Narquin, restituted seven artworks that had belonged to Fould-Stern to her heirs.

== See also ==
- Reichsleiter Rosenberg Taskforce
