= 1891 Stowmarket by-election =

UK Parliamentary by-election

The 1891 Stowmarket by-election was held on 5 May 1891 after the death of the incumbent Conservative MP Edward Greene. It was gained by the Liberal candidate Sydney Stern.

Stowmarket by-election, 1891
Party	Candidate	Votes	%	±%
Liberal	Sydney James Stern	4,346	51.3	+5.0
Conservative	Edward Walter Greene	4,132	48.7	−5.0
Majority		214	2.6	N/A
Turnout		8,478	74.5	+5.8
Liberal gain from Conservative		Swing	+5.0	
