= Raphael Tuck & Sons =

Postcard and picture publisher

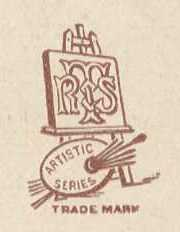
- Company type: Private
- Industry: Printing
- Founded: 1870
- Founder: Raphael Tuck
- Defunct: 1959; 66 years ago
- Fate: Merged to form the "British Printing Corporation"
- Headquarters: City of London, U.K.
- Products: Postcards

Raphael Tuck & Sons was a business started by Raphael Tuck and his wife in Bishopsgate in the City of London in October 1866, selling pictures and greeting cards, and eventually selling postcards, which was their most successful line. Their business was one of the best known in the "postcard boom" of the late 1890s and early 1900s. During the Blitz, the company headquarters, Raphael House, was destroyed, including the originals for most of their series. The company never fully recovered.

== History ==
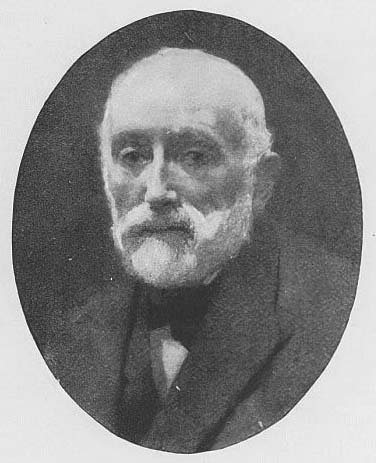
Raphael Tuck, founder

Raphael Tuck was born in Koschmin, East Prussia on 7 August 1821, worked as a carpenter, and married Ernestine Lissner in March 1848. The couple's family of four boys and three girls were all born in Prussia, before they moved to London in 1864 as refugees from the Second Schleswig War. As the family of seven children grew older, the children provided more help to the business. Raphael sent out his sons, Herman, Adolph and Gustave, to bring in more business. Herman and Adolph also went on selling trips, and at the end of the day they would check the results of the day's work. The one with the higher sales would have the bigger egg next morning for breakfast.

Three of the four sons participated in the firm established by their father. Their second son, Adolph, was chairman and managing director of Raphael Tuck and Sons Ltd. until his death on 3 July 1926, aged 72. He was created a baronet on 19 July 1910 (see Tuck baronets). The Tuck coat-of-arms features a shield with a flaming antique lamp above which are two hands in the attitude of prayer, with two crossed F's in a circle at the lower part of the shield. The crest shows a seated lion supporting an artist's palette whereupon is inscribed the work “Thorough". The Tuck motto inscribed on a ribbon below the shield is Cum Deo (i.e., "with God").

Raphael Tuck had received training in graphic arts in his home country; also, although he was not an artist himself, he had a flair for commercial art that prompted his interest in this new field. Upon coming to England, he caught the imagination of the public in such a way that he was able to create a new graphic arts business. He was so successful at it that, according to The Times he "opened up a new field of labour for artists, lithographers, engravers, printers, ink and paste board makers, and several other trade classes".

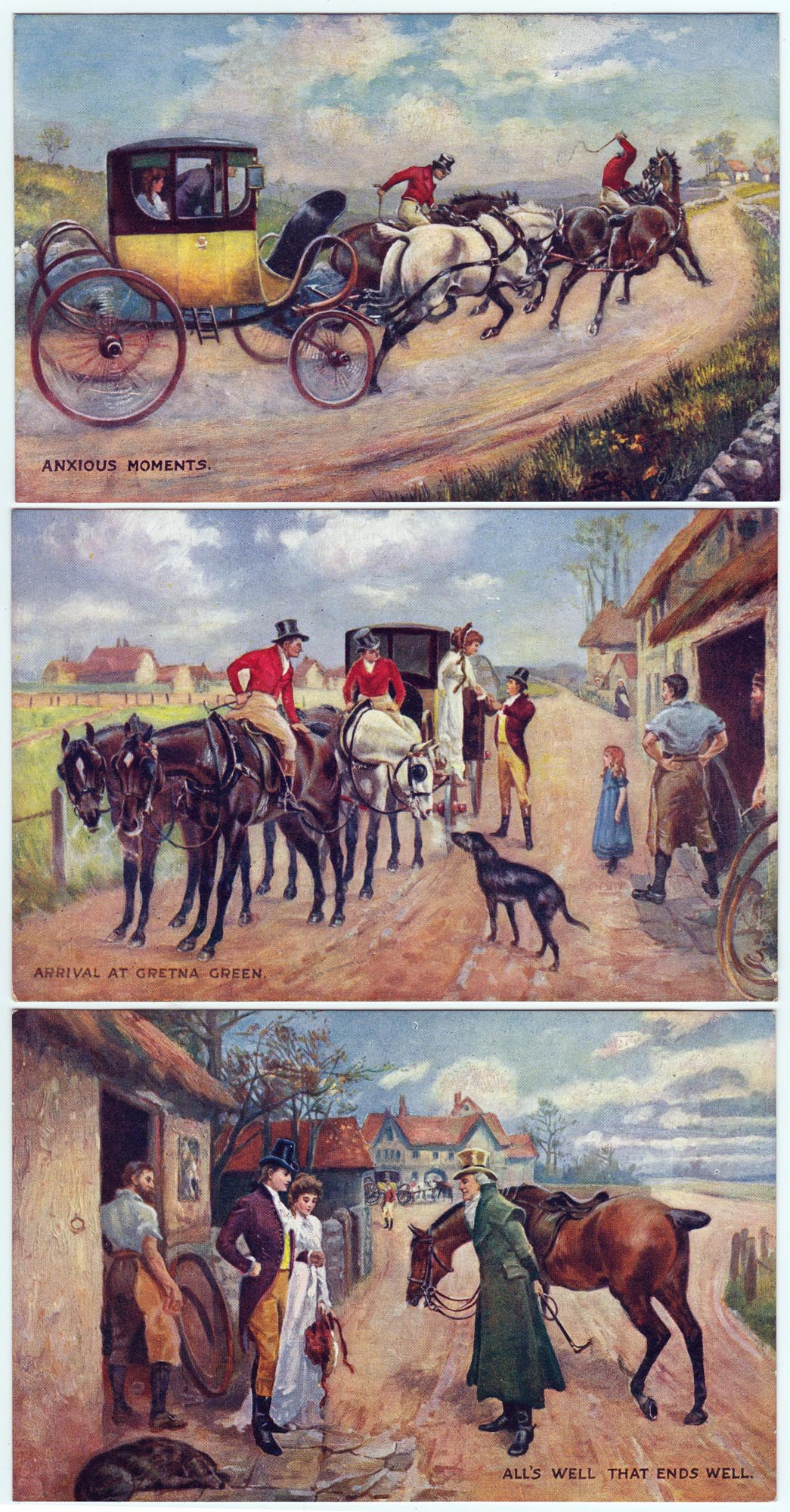
Scenes from "The Marriage at Gretna Green": three Oilette postcards by Raphael Tuck, beginning in 1903

Tuck's continued to run very successful postcard competitions through the early 1900s with the focus changing to collectors of Tuck postcards rather than of postcards by the artists whose work was depicted. The top part of the 1903 Tuck Exchange Register pictured above announces the second of Tuck's prize competitions which began in 1900. The prize competitions aroused much interest. The first contest winner turned in a collection of 20,364 cards over the 18-month duration of the contest. The second prize competition winner submitted 25,239 cards. In 1914 the fourth prize competition was announced. The competitions were a novel and effective marketing technique.

Although the Tuck firm did some black-and-white printing in their London offices, the majority of colour work was contracted for in Germany, Raphael's home country. This is evidenced by the wording "printed (or chromographed) in Bavaria" (or Germany or Saxony) inscribed on the majority of the early Tuck postcards.

The greatest period of expansion of the Tuck firm came under the direction of Adolph who had joined his father in 1870. Gustave and Herman soon followed their brother in 1871. Adolph became managing director, which included control of the art department. Gustave directed the book and calendar departments, while Herman handled the financial end of the business.

Raphael Tuck & Sons were pioneers in the creation of movable books, panoramas, and pop-ups during the late 19th and early 20th centuries. Known for their high-quality chromolithographed illustrations, the company produced a wide variety of interactive children's books that featured innovative paper engineering. Tuck’s movable books included intricate mechanisms such as pull-tabs and pop-ups, which brought stories to life for young readers. Their panorama books, often unfolding into long scenic displays, showcased the firm’s attention to detail and artistic craftsmanship. Raphael Tuck & Sons became renowned for their contributions to the genre, and their works remain highly collectible today."

Raphael House enabled the Tuck firm to consolidate their various offices and departments that had spread throughout various parts of the city. In addition to the administrative offices, the new building provided adequate space for eight functioning departments: Card Department (Toy-Books, Gift-Books, Booklets); Birthday Book Department; Educational Department; Wall Text and Scripture Motto Department; Engraving Department; Chromo, Oleograph, and Art Study Department; Relief and Art Novelty Department; and Show-Card Department. These Tuck departments attest to the fact that the Victorian age was the age of printed pictorials that took shape by means of the various printing and engraving processes. An annexe to Raphael House, located short distance from the main building, was reported in 1925 to have been completed.

== Timeline ==
=== 1866 ===
Raphael Tuck opened a shop on Union Street, Bishopsgate, now known as Brushfield Street, and begin selling pictures and frames.

=== 1870 ===
Raphael moved to 177 City Road. His three sons joined him as the picture-framing and picture side developed into importing and publishing.

=== 1871 ===
The company produced their first Christmas greeting card.

=== 1880 ===
New premises were taken at 72–73 Coleman Street. Son Adolph launched a nationwide contest offering 5,000 guineas in prizes for the best Christmas card designs. Over five thousand paintings were said to have been entered in the contest. Entries were displayed in the Dudley Galleries and vast crowds visited the exhibition. Over £2,500 was spent in buying entries and launching the Christmas card industry as an annual custom throughout the world. Both amateur and professional artists submitted entries for the close scrutiny of the judges. Literary merit was also considered: the then-popular writer Grant Allen served as judge of appropriate texts. Marcus Stone headed a committee of well-known artists in the selection of the designs. Also in this year, the famous trade mark was applied for, and was finally registered on 2 March 1881.

=== 1882 ===
Paris branch opened.

=== 1893 ===
Queen Victoria granted the firm the Royal Warrant of Appointment. Tuck cards thereafter bore the message "Art Publishers to Her Majesty the Queen". Future sovereigns continued the warrant of appointment. One tri-fold card printed in this era was faced with embossed gold gilded lettering and heavy relief embossing of both the flowers and the lettering: Cover of flowers and wording "For Auld Acquaintance" It had inscribed inside "All Good Wishes for a happy Christmas", and an H.M. Burnside Poem. It was designed in the "London Studio" but printed in Germany. Thus preceding WW1 and after "Publishers To Her Majesty The Queen" had been awarded. 1893 - 1912

=== 1895 ===
On 27 December 1895, the firm was incorporated as a limited company, with a registered office at 72 Coleman Street, London, E.C. In the same year, they opened a new branch in New York. Raphael's wife Ernestine died and Raphael's own health began to fail.

=== 1899 ===
Raphael House was opened on 6 July 1899, located between Tenter Street, and White Street. Its five floors held every department for the existing business. The first experimental Snowdon postcard was produced, entitled the "View" postcard, showing scenes of London, with an individual number given to each card.

=== 1900 ===
Early in the year, the first 45 sets of postcards were ready. They covered the outstanding attractions of London and the River Thames. All these cards had undivided backs, leaving the room to write a message on the front that was only partially covered by the image.

Raphael Tuck died on 16 March 1900, aged 78. Adolph and his brothers continued to expand the business after Raphael's death.

In July 1900 the first postcard competition was announced. Prizes of £1,000 were offered for the largest collection of Tuck cards sent through post. First prize was awarded to the owner of 20,364 cards, a huge total to collect through the eighteen-month duration of the contest. Events such as these helped foster the "postcard boom".

The sons of Adolph Tuck, Reginald and Desmond, continued the business their grandparents had started. With the advent of World War I, they volunteered for military service. In 1910 the Tuck baronetcy was created for Adolph Tuck. He died in 1926 and was succeeded as 2nd Baronet by Reginald, his eldest son. Soon after that Gustave retired and the business was left in the hands of Sir Reginald and Desmond.

=== 1903 ===
The famous "Oilette" series was introduced, as well as the "Proof" series. The Proof series were printed on superior board, every set was stamped with a consecutive number, and a register was kept of whom the set had been sold to. Richard F. Outcault, the American cartoonist of Buster Brown fame, also produced postcards for the company around this time.<>

=== 1906 ===
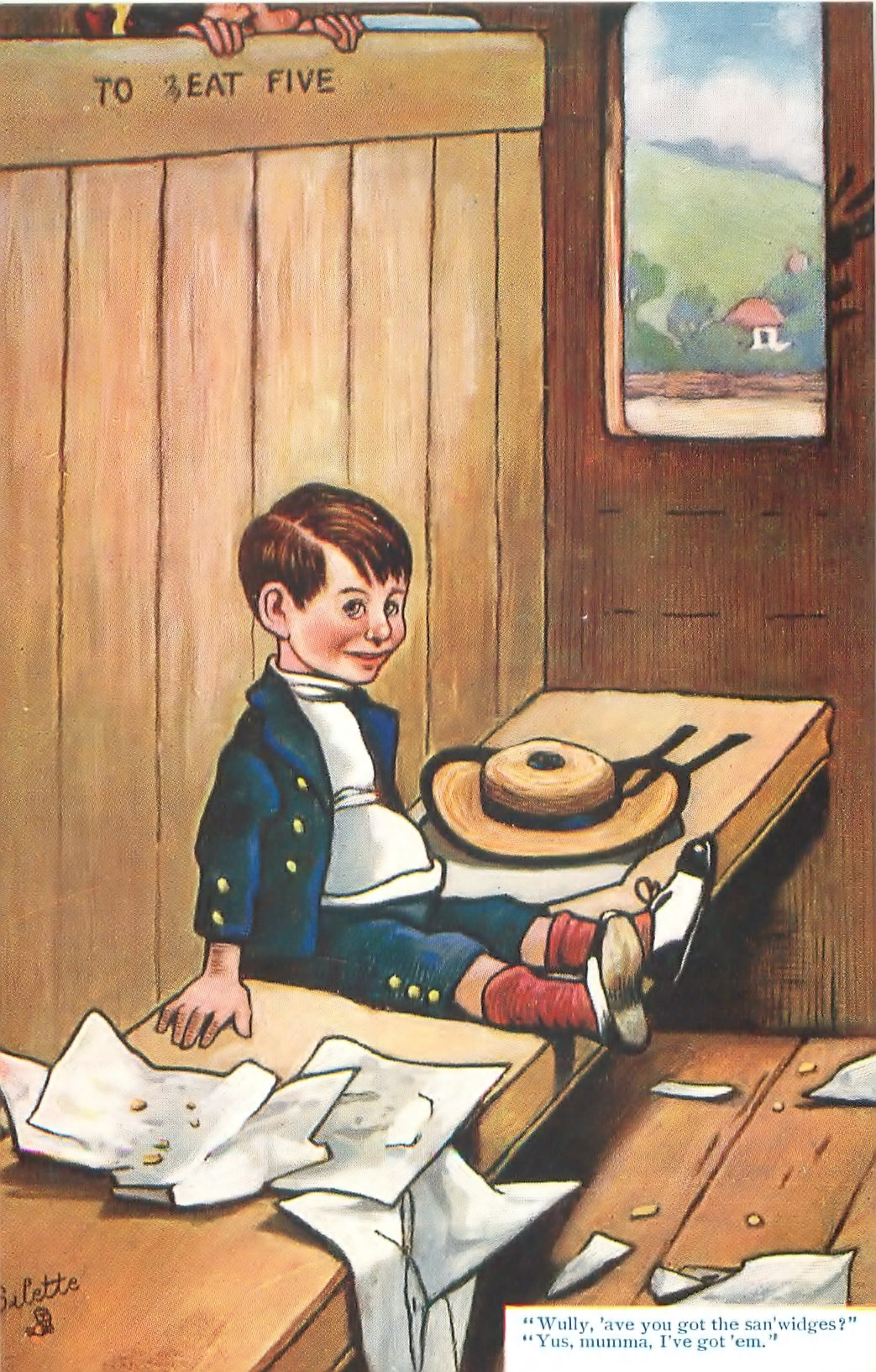
From the set "Humour of Life" (1907)

Notable artists illustrating sets this year included Lance Thackeray, producing sets such as "Amateur Gardening", Society Pets and John Hassall with "Humour of Life".

Another competition was announced in February, the aim of which was to establish the longest chain. Any public institution could be nominated, and the originator had to get as many as possible to buy a packet of Tuck cards, send one in to the institution, and the rest to his friends, telling them to do so as well. Prizes were £1,000 to the institution with the most cards, and £50 to anyone that sent a card to the winning institution.

=== 1914 ===
The fourth competition was said to have taken place in March (although there is evidence it was actually not the fourth competition, even though it was called that by Tucks themselves). Only cards passing through the post after 1 January were accepted, and the winner was once again decided by the largest collection.

A separate competition was held for children, called "Father Tuck's Painting Book Competition", with samples such as those by A. Barraud. The child then painted some of the cards in the book, which were perforated for easy removal.

=== First and Second World Wars ===
During the First World War and the Second World War, a greatly reduced but steady flow of sets of cards continued to be published, with the themes of many cards changing. Titles such as "The Call of the Flag" and "Prisoner of War" became more prominent.

=== 1940 ===
In the night of 29 December 1940, London was heavily bombed and Raphael House was destroyed. Records of seventy-four years and 40,000 or more original pictures and photographs by the best artists were in ashes. In spite of having to start over, the company was soon making progress.

=== 1950 ===
After the war, many employees came back, and the company enjoyed success. New headquarters were built in the West End of London. They also built a branch in Northampton.

=== 1954 ===
Sir Reginald Tuck died, and his son Bruce inherited the title of baronet, but soon left the company, leaving Desmond Tuck in charge.

=== 1959 ===
Desmond Tuck retired. The company combined with two others, to become the British Printing Corporation (renamed British Printing & Communications Corporation in 1982 and finally Maxwell Communications Corporation in 1987), which was originally located only a short distance from where the first shop of Ernestine and Raphael Tuck once stood.

== Examples ==
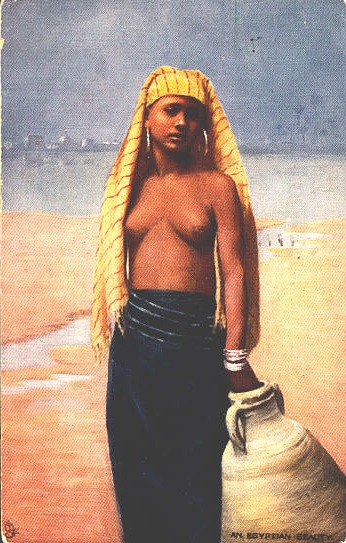

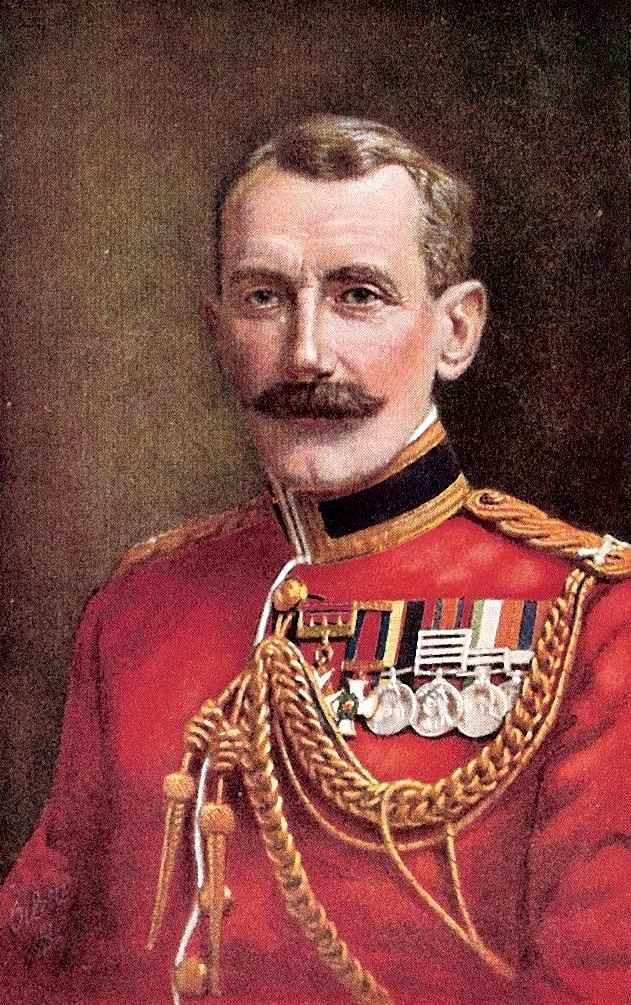

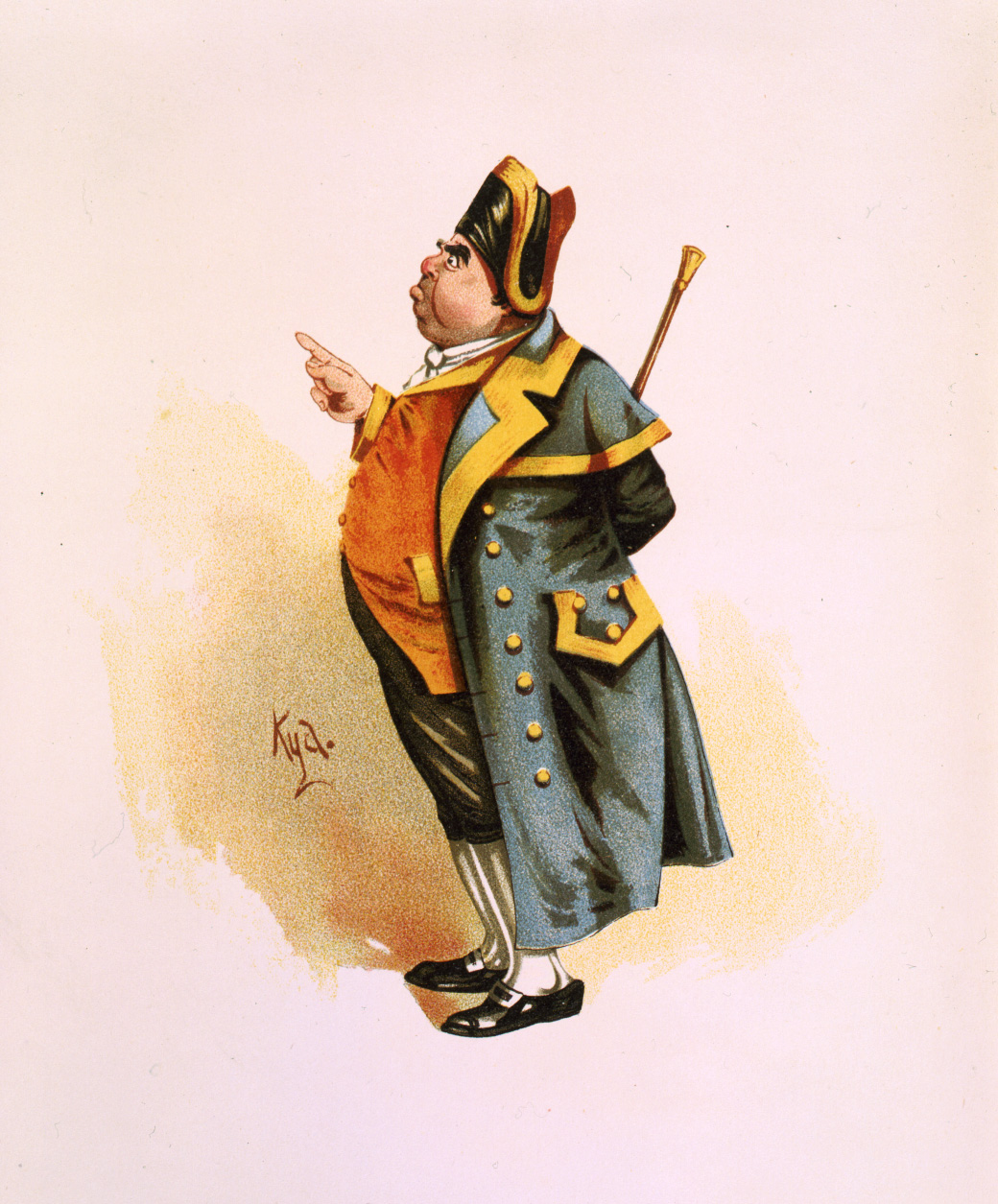

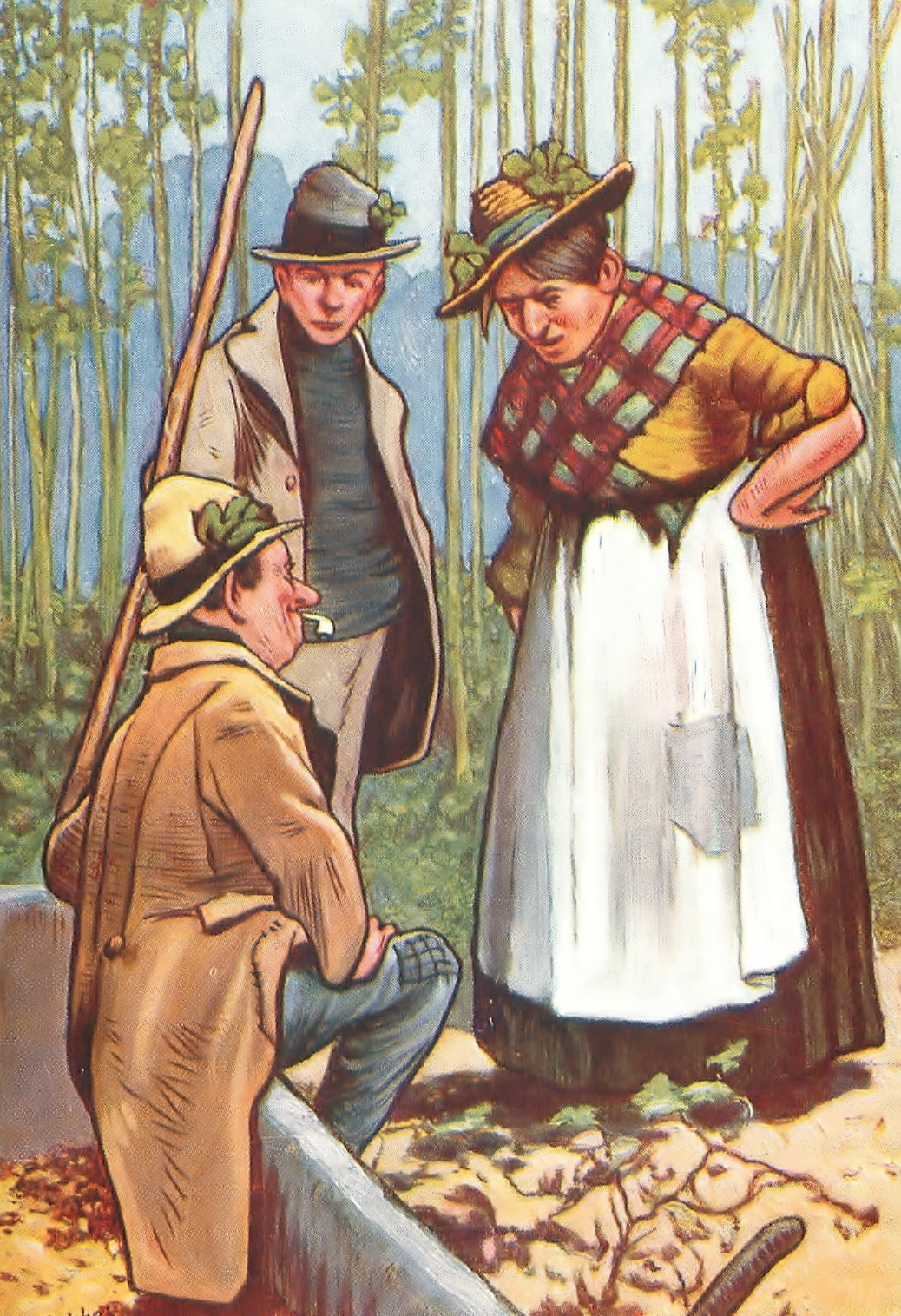

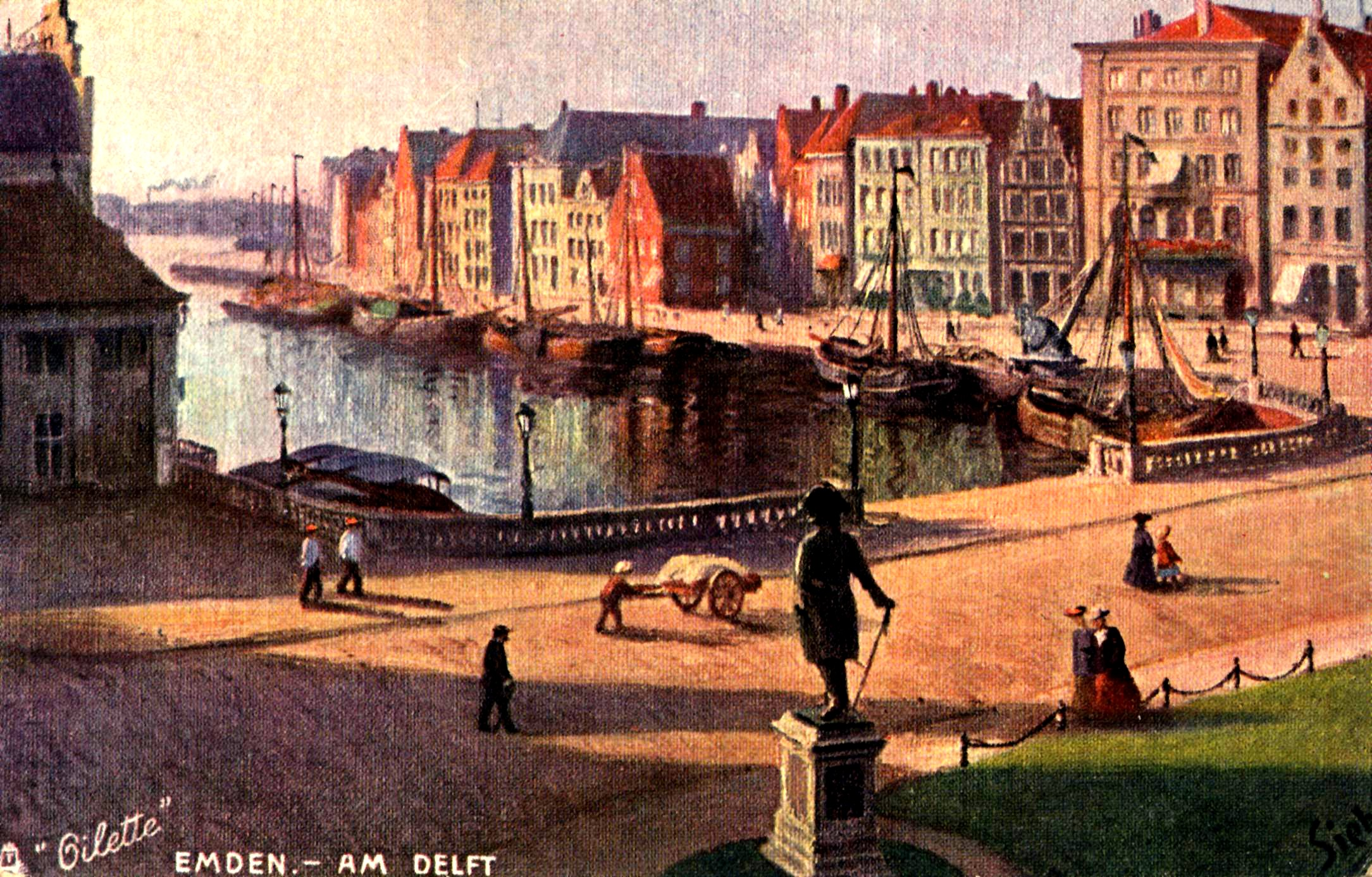

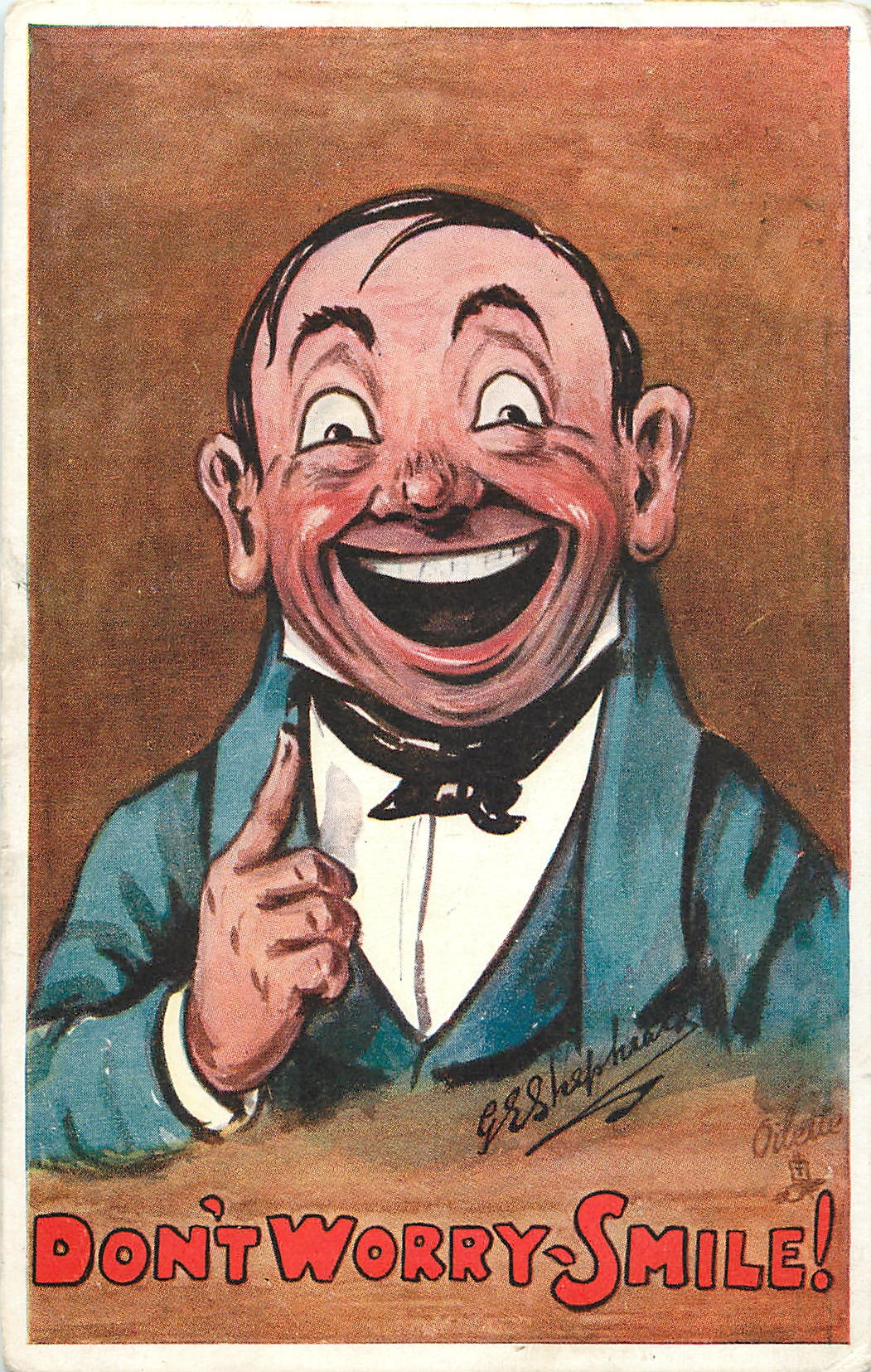

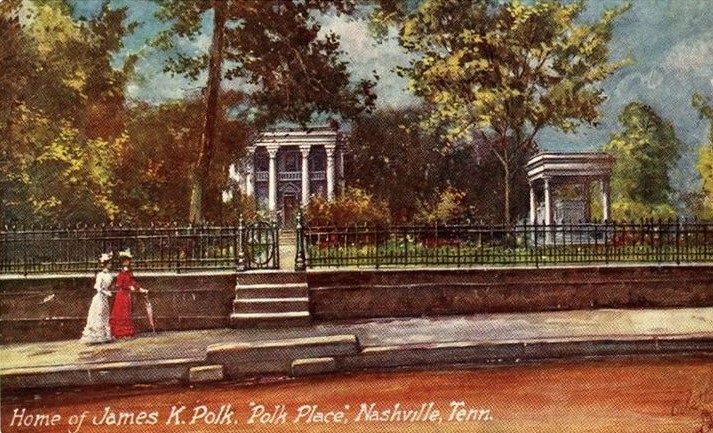
