= Adolph Tuck =

Prussian-British fine art publisher

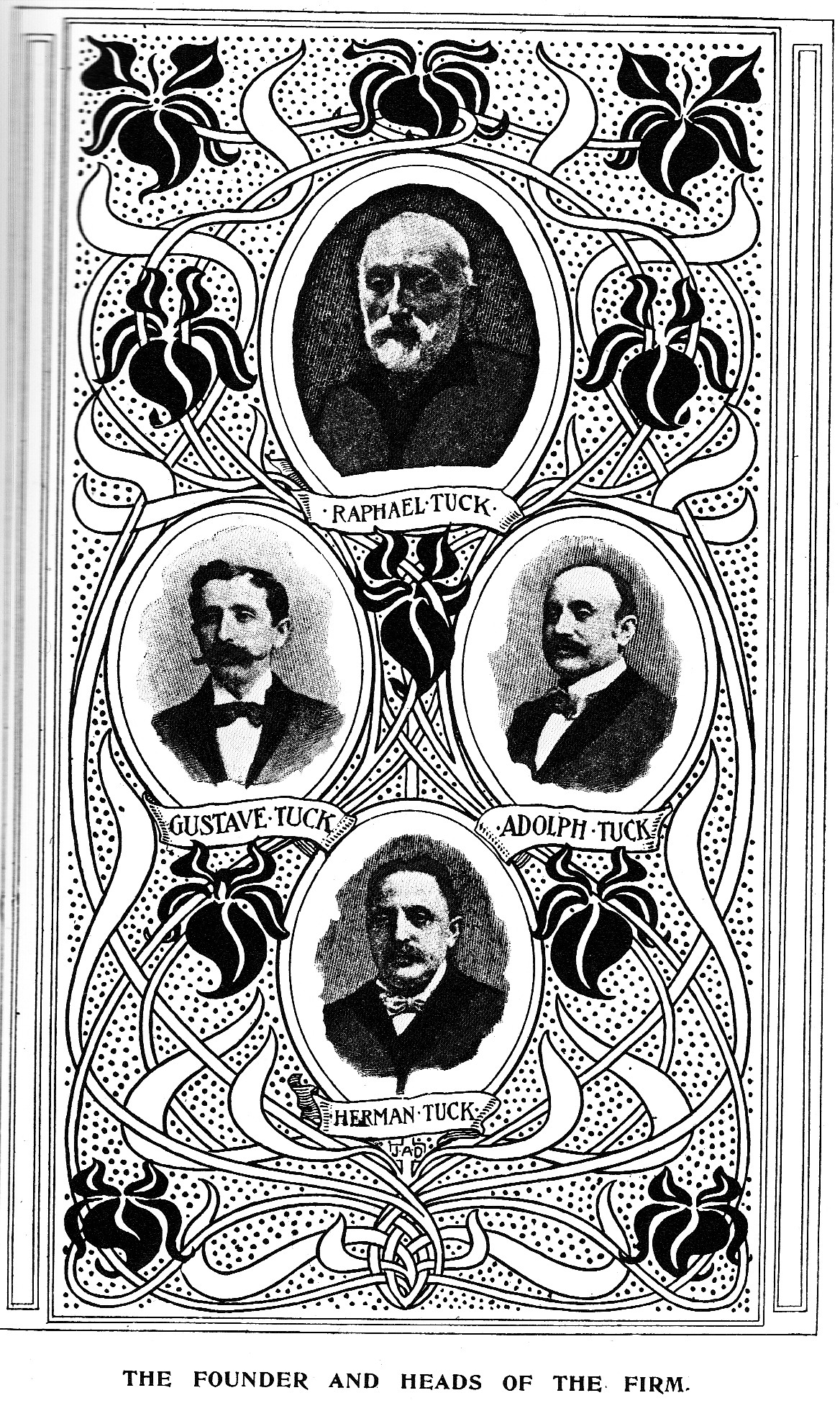
Adolph Tuck, his brothers and his father

Sir Adolph Tuck, 1st Baronet (30 January 1854–3 July 1926), was a Prussian-British fine art publisher and chairman of Raphael Tuck & Sons. He was created a baronet in 1910. It was due to the efforts of Adolph Tuck that the size of the postcard in England was increased to the size allowed by the Universal Postal Union.

== Early life ==
Tuck was born in Prussia on 30 January 1854, the second son of Raphael Tuck, and was educated at Elizabeth's Gymnasium in Breslau. The family moved to London in 1864, as refugees from the Second Schleswig War. They were Jewish.

== Raphael Tuck & Sons ==
At the age of fifteen, Tuck joined his father's business, Raphael Tuck & Sons art publishers. By 1879 Tuck had started a series of Christmas card design exhibitions at the Dudley Gallery, but the company was best known as the first to introduce the picture postcard to the British Empire. Tuck became a naturalized British subject in 1883 and was created a baronet in 1910.

== Family life ==
In 1882, Tuck married Jeanetta Flatau, with whom he had two sons and three daughters. In 1925, the couple's second daughter, Sybil Grace (1887–1979), married the banker and philanthropist Sir Edward Stern (1854–1933), of the Stern family. Their youngest daughter, Muriel, married Leonard Goldsmid-Montefiore in 1924.

Tuck died at his London home at 29 Park Crescent, Portland Place, on 3 July 1926, when his eldest son Major William Reginald Tuck inherited the baronetcy.

Baronetage of the United Kingdom
New creation	Baronet (of Park Crescent in St Marylebone); 1910–1926	Succeeded by Reginald Tuck
