= Banque Stern =

- Type: Public
- Industry: Financial services
- Founded: 1835; 191 years ago Paris, France
- Founder: Antoine Jacob Stern (CEO)
- Headquarters: Paris (incorporation) Paris, France (operational)
- Key people: Edouard Stern (CEO)
- Products: Financial services Investment banking Investment management
- Owner: Stern family

Banque Stern was a financial advisory firm that engages in investment banking, family office, and other financial services primarily with institutional clients. Its principal executive offices are in Paris.

== History ==
Antoine Jacob Stern and his brother Léopold Stern (1810-1846) create in June 1842 the investment bank A. J. Stern & Cie, at 33 rue Laffitte, Paris to form one of the ten main investment banks in Europe with their cousins who formed in 1844 the Stern Brothers in London.

In the 20th century the Stern family was a shareholder of the Banque de France and was one of the main banking families in Paris with Lazard and Rothschilds in France. In 1977-1978, the Banque Rothschild took over 48% of the shares of Bank Stern.

During the 1980s, Edouard Stern took control of the family bank and revamped the bank, expanding its activity in financial markets, as well as in mergers and acquisitions. In 1985, Stern sold the bank for 300 million francs ($60 million in 2005 dollars) to Lebanese investors and become Bank Pallas-Stern. Thanks to a clause attached to the contract, Stern got to keep the copyright over his last name Stern. Immediately after the sale went through, Stern started a new bank, with a similar name and business profile, drawing in many of his former clients. He sold this second institution for an estimated 1.75 billion francs in 1988 to the Swiss Bank Corporation (SBS, which will later merge with UBS to form UBS S.A.). As a result of these transactions, Stern shot up the ranks of the richest families in France, occupying the 38th spot, according to Forbes.

== See also ==
- List of banks in France
