= Lewis Durlacher =

British chiropodist who was appointed as surgeon-chiropodist to the royal household

- Born: 1792; Warwickshire, London, England
- Died: 3 March 1864 (aged 71–72)
- Resting place: Balls Pond Road Cemetery
- Occupation: Surgeon-chiropodist
- Known for: Service in the British royal household
- Spouse: Susannah Levi
- Children: Five sons (Alfred, Alexander, Montague, Henry and George) and a daughter (Elizabeth)
- Parents: Solomon Abraham Durlacher (father); Elizabeth ("Betsy") Harris (mother)

Lewis Durlacher (1792– 3 March 1864) was a chiropodist who was appointed as surgeon-chiropodist to the royal household in 1823 and served under George IV, William IV and Queen Victoria.

Durlacher was born in Warwickshire (some sources say Birmingham). His parents, who were Jewish, were Solomon Abraham Durlacher (1757–1845), a chiropodist and dentist who came from Durlach near Karlsruhe, Germany, and his wife Elizabeth ("Betsy") Harris who was from Warwickshire, perhaps Birmingham.

He and his wife Susannah (née Levi; c.1798–1874) are both buried at Balls Pond Road Cemetery in London.

They had five sons (Alfred, Alexander, Montague, Henry and George) and a daughter (Elizabeth). Their son Montague succeeded his father in the role of surgeon-chiropodist to the royal household. Henry and George became art dealers in London, founding Durlacher Brothers in 1843; two of Henry's sons opened a New York branch in the 1920s.

== Publications ==
A medical illustration of bunions from Durlacher's book A Treatise on Corns, Bunions

A Treatise on Corns, Bunions, the Diseases of Nails and the General Management of the Feet. London: Simpkin, Marshall and Co., 1845.
