= Elcan Durlacher =

German Hebraist and publisher

- Yiddish: אלחנן בן נתנאל דורלאכער
- Born: 1817; Karlsruhe, Grand Duchy of Baden, German Confederation
- Died: 21 December 1889 (aged 71–72)
- Writing career
- Language: French

Elcan Durlacher (Yiddish: אלחנן בן נתנאל דורלאכער; 1817 – 21 December 1889) was a German Hebraist and publisher, best known for his translations of Jewish liturgy into French.

Durlacher was born in Karlsruhe, Baden in 1817. He went to Paris in 1845 as a teacher of languages, and founded a Hebrew publishing-house, which was continued, after his death, by his son. He compiled a Hebrew reader and an almanac, and wrote a small book entitled Joseph and His Brothers. His two most notable works are a French translation of the German maḥzor, and another of the siddur, which he made with the assistance of L. Wogue, whose edition of the Pentateuch he published.

== Publications ==
- Erech hathephiloth, ou, Rituel de toutes les grandes fêtes à l'usage des Israélites du rite Allemand (in Hebrew and French). Paris: Elcan Durlacher. 1852.
- Erech hathephiloth, ou, Prier̀es et pioutim de tous les sabbats de l'année (in Hebrew and French). Paris: Elcan Durlacher. 1861.
- Séder hathephiloth, ou, Rituel des prières journalières à l'usage des Israélites du rite allemand (in Hebrew and French) (3rd ed.). Paris: Elcan Durlacher. 1870.
- Joseph et ses frères (in French). Paris: Elcan Durlacher. 1887.
