= Montague Durlacher =

English surgeon-chiropodist

- Born: 9 April 1824; Westminster, London, England
- Died: 16 November 1894
- Resting place: Balls Pond Road Cemetery
- Occupation: Surgeon-chiropodist
- Known for: Service in Queen Victoria's household
- Spouse(s): (1) Deborah Benjamin (1850–1879) (2) Anne Louis, née Phillips (1881–1894)
- Children: One daughter (Frances Susannah Durlacher)
- Parents: Lewis Durlacher (father); Susannah Durlacher, née Levi (mother)

Montague Durlacher (9 April 1824 – 16 November 1894) was an English surgeon-chiropodist. In 1879 he was appointed as surgeon-chiropodist to Queen Victoria's household, in succession to his father Lewis.

He was born in Westminster into a Jewish family, the third son of Lewis Durlacher (c.1792–1864) and his wife Susannah née Levi (c.1798–1874), who are both buried at Balls Pond Road Cemetery in London.

Durlacher's first marriage, in 1850, was to Deborah Benjamin (who died in 1879 and is buried at Balls Pond Road Cemetery). Their only child, Frances Susannah Durlacher, married dentist Edward Newton Jones, who took the surname Durlacher. Montague Durlacher's second wife, whom he married in June 1881, was Anne Louis, daughter of Israel Phillips. She died on 26 May 1916, aged 78, and is buried at Balls Pond Road Cemetery.

Montague Durlacher died on 16 November 1894, aged 71. He is buried at Balls Pond Road Cemetery.
