= Herbert Stern, 1st Baron Michelham =

British financier, philanthropist (1851–1919)

The Right Honourable The Lord Michelham KCVO
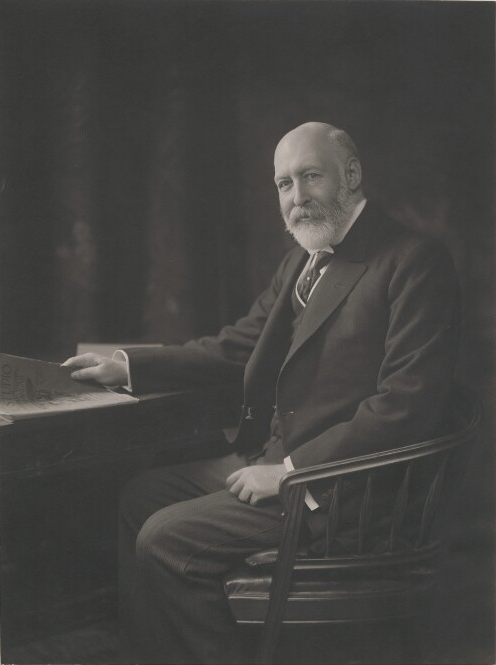
- Born: 28 September 1851
- Died: 7 January 1919 (aged 67)
- Occupations: Financier; philanthropist
- Parent: Hermann de Stern
- Relatives: David de Stern (paternal uncle); Sydney Stern, 1st Baron Wandsworth (cousin)

Herbert Stern, 1st Baron Michelham KCVO (28 September 1851 – 7 January 1919), known as Sir Herbert Stern, Bt, between July and December 1905, was a British financier, philanthropist and a member of the Stern banking family.

== Background ==
Stern was the son of Hermann de Stern (1815–1887), a German-born banker, head of the merchant bank Stern Brothers (London) and Portuguese baron (created 1864), and Julia Goldsmid. He was the first cousin of Lord Wandsworth and Sir Edward Stern.

== Career ==
On his father's death, in October 1887, Stern inherited the Portuguese barony and a fortune of £2 million, which he substantially increased during his lifetime. He was a prominent philanthropist, contributing to the National Gallery and funding Adrian Jones' quadriga atop Wellington Arch via an anonymous donation of approximately £20,000. During the First World War he acquired Hotel Astoria in Paris to be used as a hospital for British troops. He was also involved in thoroughbred horse racing and is known for having bred Plucky Liege, one of the most important broodmares of the 20th century.

Stern was created a Baronet, of Strawberry Hill in the Parish of Twickenham and County of Middlesex, in July 1905 and raised to the peerage as Baron Michelham, of Hellingly in the County of Sussex, in December of the same year. He was elected an Alderman of the London County Council on 12 March 1907.

Stern was elected a director of the Metropolitan District Railway Company on 6 October 1904, and held that position until resigning in February 1906. He was elected a director of the Cambrian Railway Company in August 1905.

Lord Michelham was appointed a Knight Commander of the Royal Victorian Order (KCVO) in 1912.

== Personal life ==
Stern married Aimee Geraldine Bradshaw on 28 July 1899. She had been born on 20 March 1882, and was thus aged 17 at the time of this marriage.

Lord Michelham died at his London home, Prince`s Gate, on 7 January 1919, aged 67, and was succeeded by his son, Herman Alfred (1900–1984).

== Sources ==
Orbell, John. "Stern family (per. c.1830–1964)". Oxford Dictionary of National Biography (online ed.). Oxford University Press. doi:10.1093/ref:odnb/53820. (Subscription, Wikipedia Library access or UK public library membership required.)

Baronetage of the United Kingdom
| New creation | Baronet (of Strawberry Hill); 1905–1919 | Succeeded by Herman Alfred Stern |
Peerage of the United Kingdom
| New creation | Baron Michelham; 1905–1919 | Succeeded by Herman Alfred Stern |
