= Lyne, Surrey =

Village and parish in Surrey, England

Coordinates: 51.385865°N 0.545275°W

Lyne
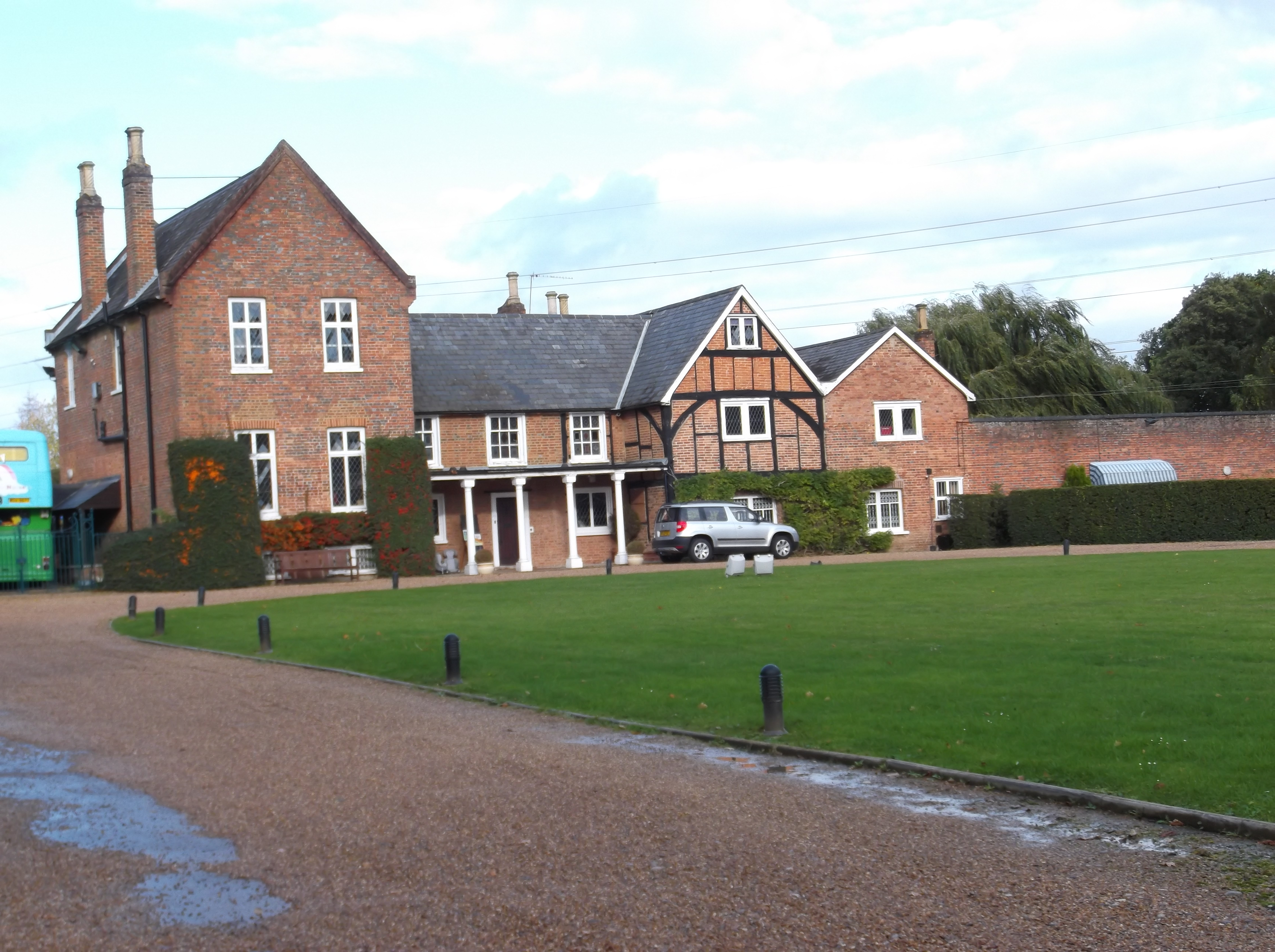
- Almners Priory

- Location within Surrey
- Area: 8.07 km^{2} (3.12 sq mi)
- Population: 1,576 2011 census
  - Density: 195/km^{2} (510/sq mi)
- OS grid reference: TQ0166
- District: Runnymede
- Shire county: Surrey
- Region: South East
- Country: England
- Sovereign state: United Kingdom
- Post town: CHERTSEY
- Postcode district: KT16
- Dialling code: 01932
- Police: Surrey
- Fire: Surrey
- Ambulance: South East Coast
- UK Parliament: Runnymede and Weybridge

Lyne is a village in the Borough of Runnymede in Surrey, England, approximately 32 km (20 mi) southwest of central London. In the early 13th century, the area was known as la Linde meaning the lime tree.

The nearest town is Chertsey, approximately 1.6 miles (2.6 km) to the east. The M25 motorway is accessible via junction 11 and runs immediately to the east of the village.

== History ==
The village was for the centuries (from at least the Norman Conquest) until the early 20th century in the parish of Chertsey. This meant it was a hamlet dominated by landholding of Chertsey Abbey throughout the Middle Ages; and before, as this was one of the earliest religious communities centred on a large building in the country, founded in the mid 7th century. Accordingly, before the Conquest the hundred (county subdivision) was named Godley. In the early centuries of this period Chertsey was divided into eight tythings: two of which were Lolewirth/Lulworth or Hardwitch/Hardwicke and Rokesbury or Ruxbury in Lyne. The 16th century replacement to great tything barn is here, close to the present Chertsey proper, that is in the east of Lyne.

In 1849 the church was built for the hamlet Lyne and Longcross in Lyne.

In 1911 its description was:

Botleys and Lyne, a hamlet of Chertsey, is 2 miles south by west. The school was built in 1895. Botleys Park, the residence of Mr. Henry Gosling, Almners Barns, now called Almners...Foxhills [more considered Ottershaw today], the seat of Sir Charles Rivers Wilson, and Fan Court [in Longcross], the seat of Sir Edward D. Stern, are in this district.

== Landmarks ==
A miniature railway is in the east of the area, close to Chertsey, the Great Cockcrow Hill miniature railway which has train rides for families.

In the 17th century Almners was built which gives its name to one of the two long built-up low-rise, low density residential roads containing most of the housing of the village. This is a large house which later became a priory in Roman Catholicism.

Hardwick Court Barn was built in the 17th century. Hardwick Court Farm has its own article as the largest example of timber-framed home in north Surrey. A minority was destroyed in World War II bomb damage to be rebuilt in brick but is otherwise a late Tudor period structure with the remainder almost wholly added in the 17th century.

== Amenities ==
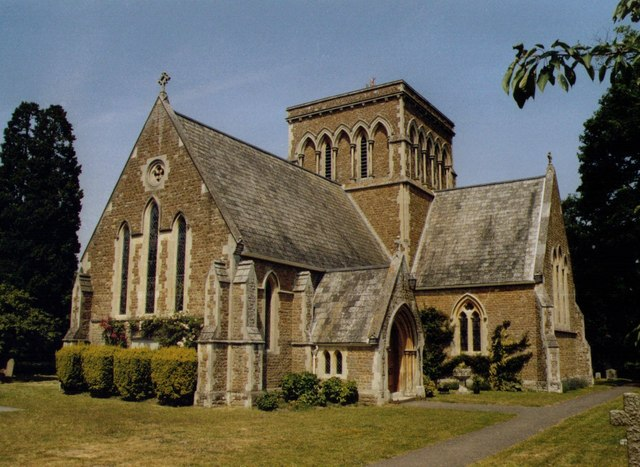
Holy Trinity Church

=== School ===
Lyne and Longcross C of E Infant School with Nursery is sponsored by the Church of England, on the Voluntary Aided legal footing.

=== Community hall ===
The village hall is modern and has substantial windows. It available for wedding hire, hosts regular sports and seasonal sports, fundraising and fun events, particularly the Lyne Summer Fete.

=== Public house ===
A public house is on Lyne Lane in the centre of the village, though in the mid-south of the suburban housing area.

=== Sport ===
The village sports three football sides from its club. These range from the Premier to the 4th division of the Guildford and Woking Alliance League which covers the west of Surrey.

=== Place of worship ===
The church community of Holy Trinity in the Church of England is centred here.

== Transport ==
Centred 1 mile (1.6 km) south-east is junction 11 of the M25 London Orbital Motorway. Circuitously the north of the village is connected, in scenic road skirting St Ann's Hill to Chertsey; the south is more directly connected to the Woking-Staines road.

Chertsey railway station is on the near side of the town, 1.5 miles (2.4 km) from the centre of Lyne.

== Demography and housing ==
2011 Census Homes
Output area	Detached	Semi-detached	Terraced	Flats and apartments	Caravans/temporary/mobile homes	shared between households
Runnymede 008A (Lyne and Longcross)	200	112	36	168	138	23

The average level of accommodation in the region composed of detached houses was 28%, the average that was apartments was 22.6%.

2011 Census Key Statistics
Output area	Population	Households	% Owned outright	% Owned with a loan	hectares
Runnymede 008A	1,576	2,323	37.7%	22.9%	807

The proportion of households in this area who owned their home outright compares to the regional average of 35.1%. The proportion who owned their home with a loan compares to the regional average of 32.5%. The remaining % is made up of rented dwellings (plus a negligible % of households living rent-free).
