= David de Stern =

British banker (1807–1877)

- Born: David Jacob Stern; 1807; Frankfurt am Main, Germany
- Died: 19 January 1877 (aged 69); Kensington, London, UK
- Resting place: Balls Pond Road Cemetery
- Occupation: Banker
- Spouse: Sophia Goldsmid
- Children: Sydney Stern, 1st Baron Wandsworth; Alice Theresa Lucas
- Relatives: Hermann de Stern (brother); Herbert Stern, 1st Baron Michelham (nephew)

David Jacob de Stern, Viscount de Stern (1807 – 19 January 1877) was a German-born British banker and senior partner of the firm of Stern Brothers.

== Life and career ==
Stern was born in Frankfurt am Main to the prominent Stern banking family. In 1833, he moved to London and in 1844 was joined by his brother Hermann.

Together, they co-founded Stern Brothers, a financial institution based in London. Stern was a member of the Commission of Lieutenancy of the City of London, and he was a director of the Imperial Bank.

In 1869, King Luís I of Portugal conferred the noble title of visconde (viscount) on him in recognition of the work of Stern's bank in floating Portuguese loans.

== Marriage and children ==
Stern married Sophia Goldsmid, daughter of Aaron Asher Goldsmid, brother of Sir Isaac Goldsmid. Their son was Sydney Stern, 1st Baron Wandsworth, and their daughter Alice Theresa Lucas was a prospective Conservative Party candidate, potentially their first woman MP.

Stern died in 1877 and his wife died in 1900. He was buried at Balls Pond Road Cemetery.
