= Stern family =

Jewish-French banking family

The Stern family is a Jewish banking family originally from Frankfurt. It traces back to Samuel Hayum Stern (1760–1819), who in the 1780s became a wine merchant in Frankfurt. In 1805, his son, Jacob Samuel Heyum Stern, converted the family business into a bank called Jacob S.H. Stern & Co., which became one of the most prominent banking institutions in Germany.

Jacob S.H. Stern sent his sons from Frankfurt to build banks in three of the most important European capitals, Paris, London and Berlin, where they prospered over the subsequent two centuries. The family built its own banks and were founders and major shareholders of leading banks that have persisted to this day, including BNP Paribas in France, Deutsche Bank in Germany, Garanti Bank in Turkey, or Banamex in Mexico.

The Stern family has a long history of commitment to society and of contribution to the arts, education and other causes.

In Germany, the family was involved in the creation of the University of Frankfurt and created the Theodor Stern Medizinisches Institut, which became the University of Frankfurt’s medical school. The family also created schools, care homes and hospitals for the bereaved and the underprivileged. The family also gave the Albrecht Dürer Bibliotek to the Frankfurt city library.

In France, the family established the Fondation Edgard Stern at the University of Paris to support underprivileged students. Edgard and Marguerite Stern also created the Fondation Fould Stern in support of Jewish children’s health and education. Members of the Stern family chaired Red Cross committees and other relief organisations during the time of the first World War.

In the United Kingdom, the family historically supported many causes, including social welfare in London’s East End, support for those affected by the First World War and other causes. Herbert Stern, Lord Michelham, bequeathed the quadriga on London’s Wellington Arch to the nation in 1912.

Designed by Adrian Jones, the sculpture depicting the angel of peace descending on the chariot of war is the largest bronze statue in Europe. The monumental sculpture took four years to complete and includes Herbert Stern’s 10-year old son, Herman, as the charioteer.

== Family tree ==
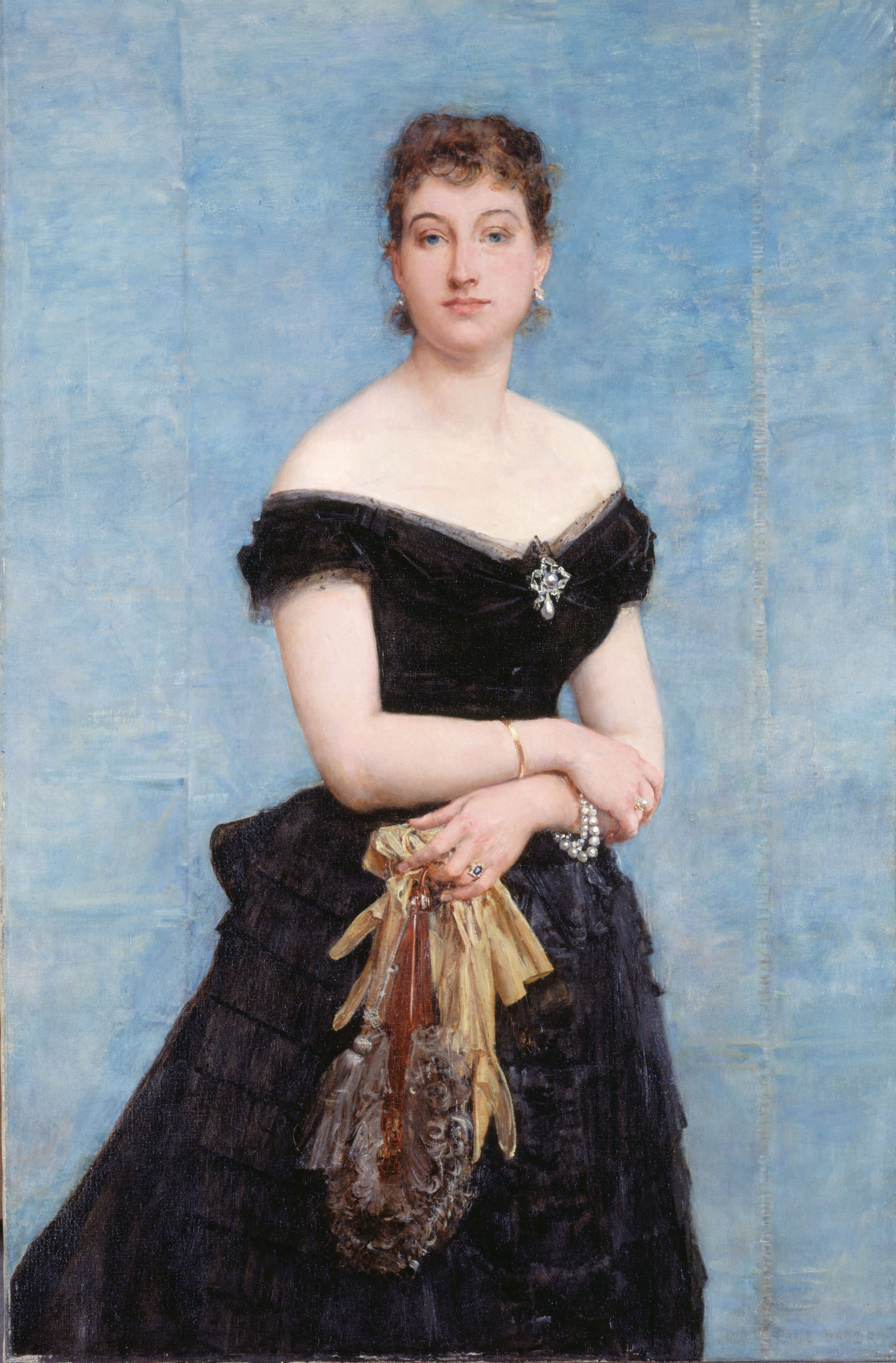
Madame Louis Singer, née Thérèse Stern (1859–1935), painted by Paul-Jacques-Aimé Baudry.

- Samuel Hayum Stern (1760–1819)
  - Jacob Samuel Heyum Stern (1780–1833)
    - Wolf Jacob Stern (1801–1854)
      - Saly Wilhelm Stern (1832–?)
        - Jacques Stern (1882–1949)
    - Antoine Jacob Stern (1805–1886), banker in Paris, founder of AJ Stern & Co. (which later became Bank Stern)
      - Henriette Stern (1836–1905), married to Georges Halphen (1832–1906)
        - Fernand Halphen (1872–1917), composer
      - Jacques Stern (1839–1902), banker in Paris, co-founder of Banque de Paris et des Pays-Bas, married to Sophie Croizette
      - Louis Stern (1840–1900), banker in Paris, married to Ernesta de Hierschel
        - Jean Stern (1874–1962), fencer, 1908 Olympic gold medalist, married to Claude Lambert (daughter of Léon Lambert and Zoé Lucie Betty de Rothschild)
    - Julius Jacob Stern (1807–1852), a banker in Berlin
      - Julius James Stern (1835–1901)
        - Albert Gerald Stern (1878–1966)
        - Frederick Claude Stern (1884–1967)
      - Theodor Stern (1837–1900)
      - Suzette Stern (1845–?), married to Henri Jules Fould (1837–1895)
        - Marguerite Fould (1866–1956), married to her second cousin Edgard Stern (1854–1936)
    - Leopold Stern (1810–1846), banker
    - David de Stern (–1877), banker in London, co-founder of Stern Brothers, ennobled by Luís I of Portugal in 1869
      - Sydney Stern (1845–1912)
      - Helen Stern (1847–1933), married to Charles Warde (1845–1937)
      - Edward David Stern (1854–1933), London banker and philanthropist, married to: 1. Constance Jessel (1858–1918), daughter of George Jessel; 2. Sybil Grace (1887–1979), daughter of Sir Adolf Tuck
      - Alice Stern (1854–1925), married to Francis Lucas
    - Hermann de Stern (1815–1887), banker in London, co-founder of Stern Brothers
      - Emily Theresa Stern (1846–1905), wife of Edward Dutton, 4th Baron Sherborne (1831–1919)
      - Herbert Stern (1851–1919)
        - Herman Alfred Stern (1900–1984), married to Beatrice Capel (sister of Boy Capel)
      - Laura Stern, married to David Lionel Goldsmid-Stern-Salomons
    - Salomon Stern (1818–1890), banker
      - Edgard Stern (1854–1937), Paris banker and art collector, married to his second cousin Marguerite Fould (1866–1956)
        - Suzanne Stern (1887–1954), married to Bertrand de Sauvan d'Aramon
        - Maurice Stern (1888–1962), banker in Paris
          - Antoine Stern (1925–1995), banker, married to Christiane Laroche (divorced from Jean-Jacques Servan-Schreiber)
            - Édouard Stern (1954–2005), banker, married to Béatrice David-Weill (daughter of Michel David-Weill)
              - Henri Stern
              - Louis Stern
              - Mathilde Stern
          - Gerard Stern (1927–), married to Brigitte Noetzlin (granddaughter of Edouard Noetzlin)
            - Jerome Stern (1969–), banker in London, founder of J. Stern & Co, married to Sarah von Goldschmidt-Rothschild (daughter of Gilbert de Goldschmidt)
      - Therese Stern (1859–1935), wife of Louis Singer (son of Flore Singer)
  - Caroline Stern (1782–1854), married Salomon Mayer von Rothschild (1774–1855)
