= Ernesta Stern =

Austrian Empire-born French author

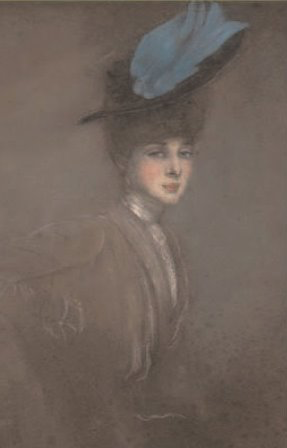
- Portrait by Antonio de La Gandara
- Born: Maria Ernesta Hierschel de Minerbi; December 8, 1854; Trieste, Austrian Empire
- Died: 1926 (aged 71–72)
- Occupation: Author
- Spouse: Louis Stern
- Parent(s): Leone de Hierschel; Clementina de Minerbi

Ernesta Stern, born Maria Ernesta Hierschel de Minerbi, also known as Maria Star, (December 8, 1854 – 1926) was an Austrian Empire-born French author. She wrote many Venetian tales and novels. She held a salon in Paris and she was awarded the knighthood of the Legion of Honour. Her Villa Torre Clementina in Roquebrune-Cap-Martin is an official historical monument.

== Early life ==
Ernesta Stern was born on December 8, 1854, in Trieste, Austrian Empire. Her father was Leone de Hierschel (son of Moisè Hierschel and Rachele Vivante) and her mother, Clementina de Minerbi (daughter of Caliman de Minerbi and Chiara di Angeli). She was Jewish.

== Career ==
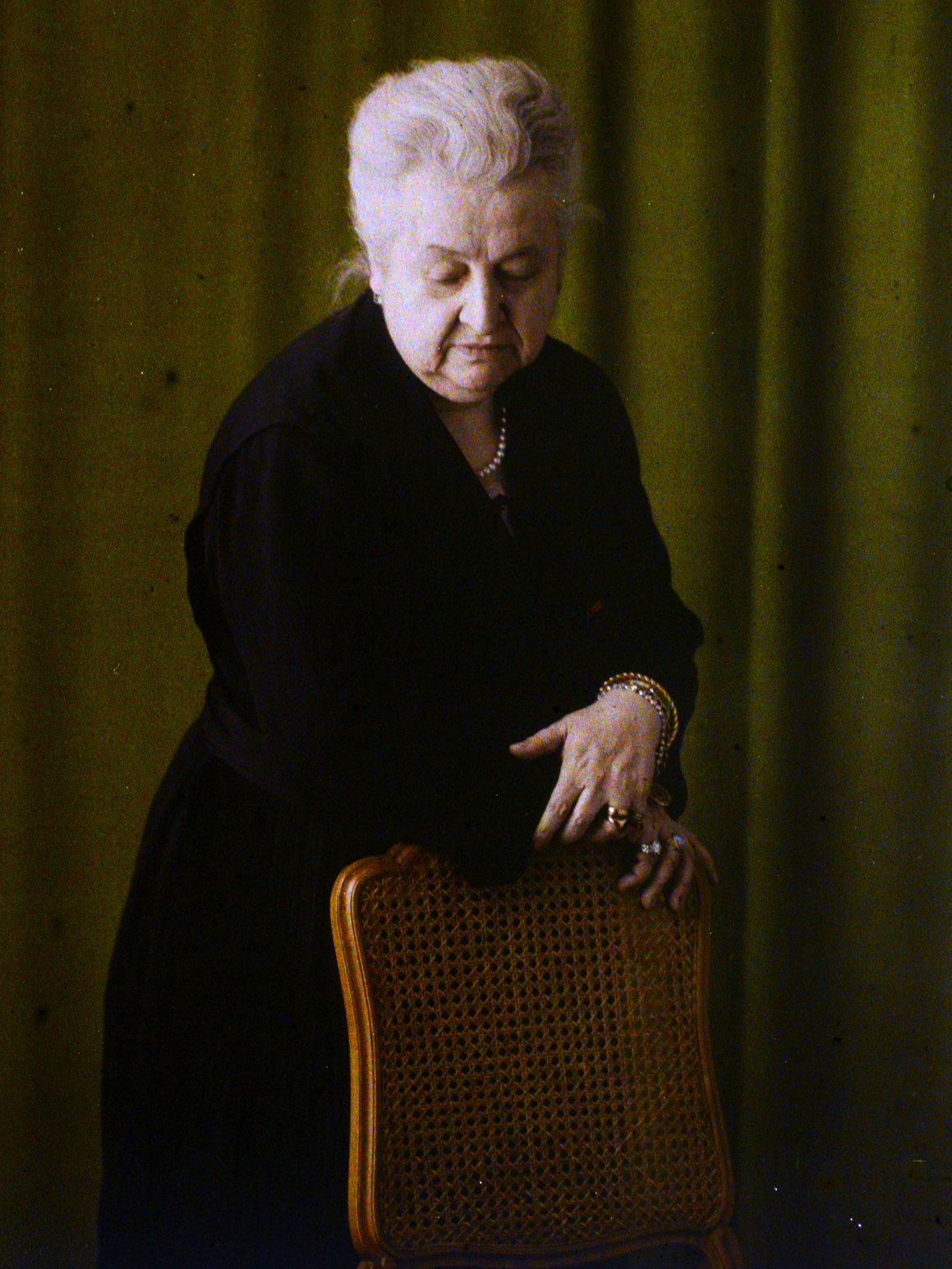
1921 Autochrome by Auguste Léon

Stern wrote Venetian tales as well as novels. For example, her 1916 novel Le Baptême du courage is about World War I.

Stern held a salon in Paris. One of her guests was Italian poet Filippo Tommaso Marinetti. She was friends with Marcel Proust.

Stern became a knight of the Legion of Honour in 1920.

== Personal life, death and legacy ==
Stern married Louis Stern, a banker and a member of the Stern family. They resided at 68 Rue du Faubourg Saint-Honoré in Paris. She was widowed in 1900, and she built the Villa Torre Clementina in Roquebrune-Cap-Martin in 1904.

Stern died in 1926. Her house in Roquebrune-Cap-Martin is listed as an official historical monument by the French Ministry of Culture.

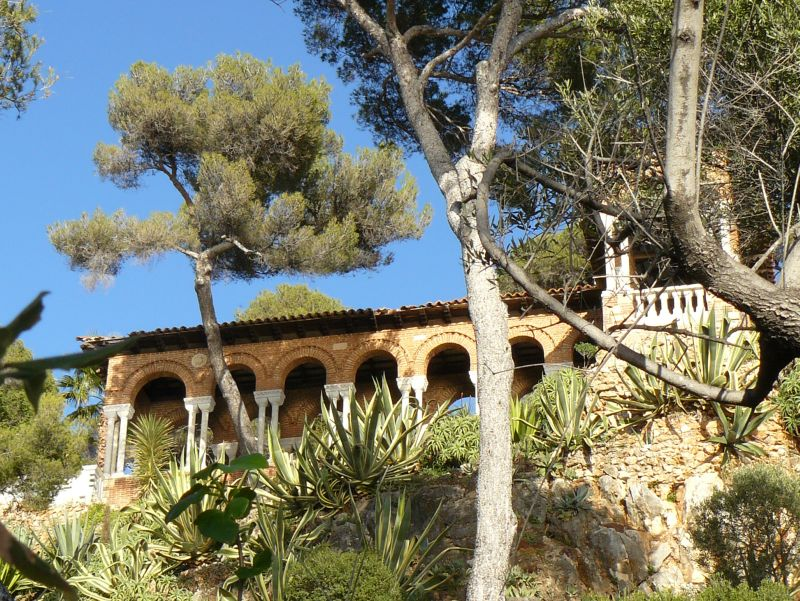
The Villa Torre Clementina in Roquebrune-Cap-Martin.

== Works ==
- Stern, Ernesta (1896). Au fil des pensées. Paris: Chaix. OCLC 459061767.
- Stern, Ernesta (1897). Autour du cœur. Paris: P. Ollendorff. OCLC 759765093.
- Stern, Ernesta (1898). Quinze jours à Londres. Paris: P. Ollendorff. OCLC 459061839.
- Stern, Ernesta (1900). Impressions d'Espagne. Paris: P. Ollendorff. OCLC 459061830.
- Star, Maria (1901). Âmes de chefs-d'œuvre. OCLC 79204042.
- Stern, Ernesta (1903). Chaînes de fleurs. Paris: Gazette des Beaux-Arts. OCLC 83397671.
- Stern, Ernesta (1903). Terre des symboles. Paris: Gazette des Beaux-Arts. OCLC 29114819.
- Stern, Ernesta (1907). Visions de beauté. Paris: Imprimerie de Frazier-Soye. OCLC 459061869.
- Stern, Ernesta (1907). Le Coeur effeuillé, comédies. Paris: F. Juven. OCLC 459061804.
- Star, Maria (1909). Les légendes de Venise. Paris: Émile-Paul. OCLC 6414503.
- Star, Maria (1909). Les deux gloires. Paris: La phalange. OCLC 978126885.
- Stern, Ernesta (1911). Faut-il pardonner?. Paris: A. Lemerre. OCLC 79634387.
- Stern, Ernesta (1912). Qui l'emporte ?. Paris: A. Lemerre. OCLC 459061833.
- Stern, Ernesta (1914). Suprême amour. Paris: A. Lemerre. OCLC 459061853.
- Stern, Ernesta (1916). Le Baptême du courage (manuscrit de la guerre). Paris: Éditions de la "Nouvelle revue. OCLC 459061790.
- Stern, Ernesta (1921). Une vie manquée. Paris: Éditions Gallus. OCLC 459061865.
- Stern, Ernesta (1921). Au soir de la vie : pensées. Paris: Gallus. OCLC 42797096.
- Star, Maria (1923). L'Épervier d'or. Paris: La Revue mondiale. OCLC 459061809.
- Stern, Ernesta (1924). Sémiramis. Paris: Éditions de la Revue mondiale. OCLC 775730991.
