= Sydney Stern, 1st Baron Wandsworth =

British banker, MP and philanthropist

The Right Honourable The Lord Wandsworth JP
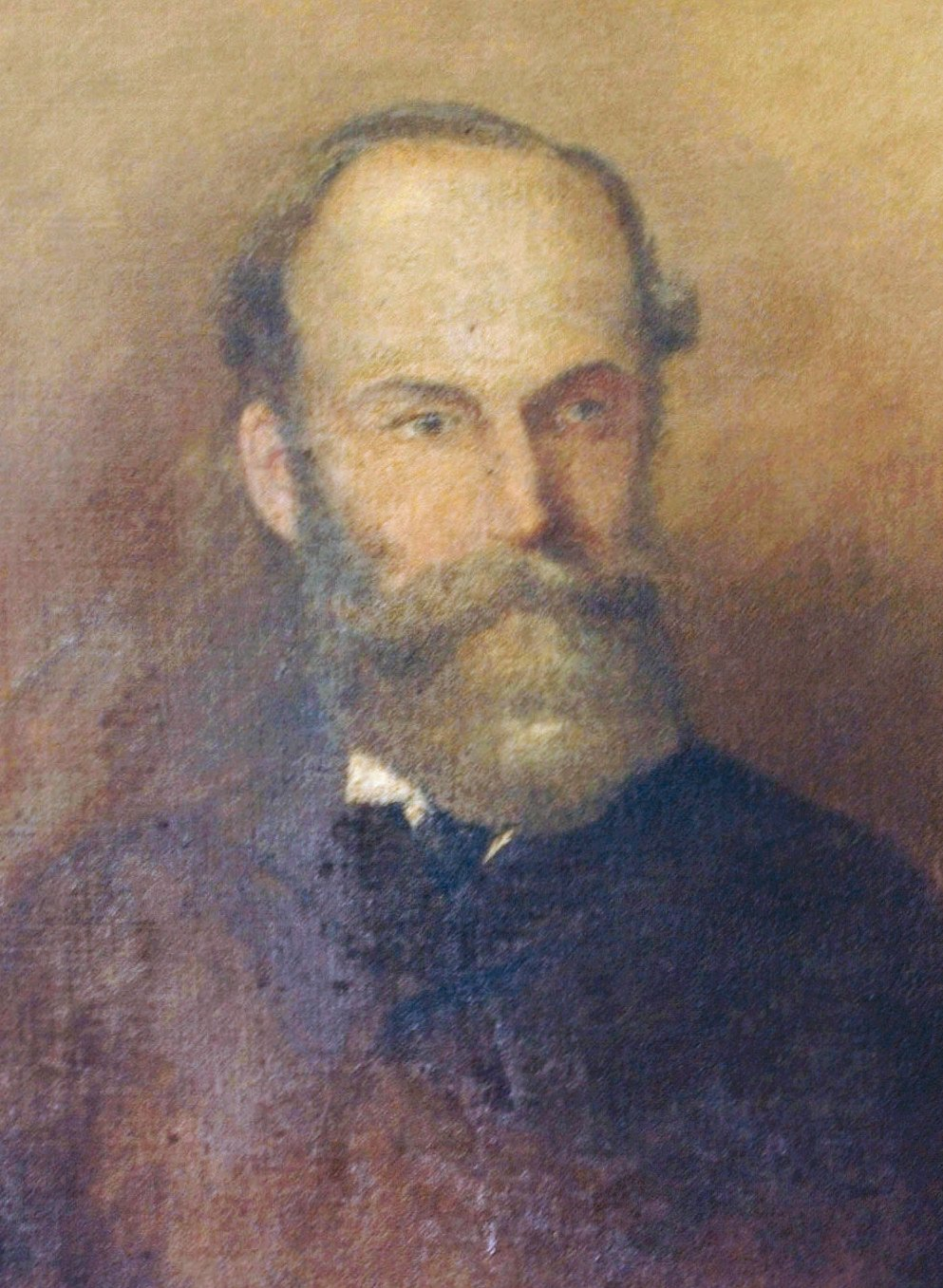

Member of Parliament for Stowmarket
- In office 1891–1895
- Preceded by: Edward Greene
- Succeeded by: Ian Malcolm

Personal details
- Born: Sydney James Stern; 1844 London, U.K.
- Died: 10 February 1912 (aged 67–68) London, U.K.
- Parent: David de Stern
- Relatives: Hermann de Stern (paternal uncle); Lord Michelham (cousin)
- Occupation: Banker, politician

Sydney James Stern, 1st Baron Wandsworth, JP (1844 – 10 February 1912) was a British banker, Liberal Member of Parliament, philanthropist and member of the Stern banking family.

== Background and education ==
Stern was born in London in 1844, the eldest son of Viscount David de Stern (1807-1877), the German-born senior partner of the merchant bank of Stern Brothers, and Sophia, daughter of Aaron Asher Goldsmid, brother of Sir Isaac Lyon Goldsmid. He was the elder brother of Sir Edward Stern and the first cousin of Lord Michelham. He was educated at Magdalene College, Cambridge, and admitted to the Inner Temple in 1874.

== Career ==
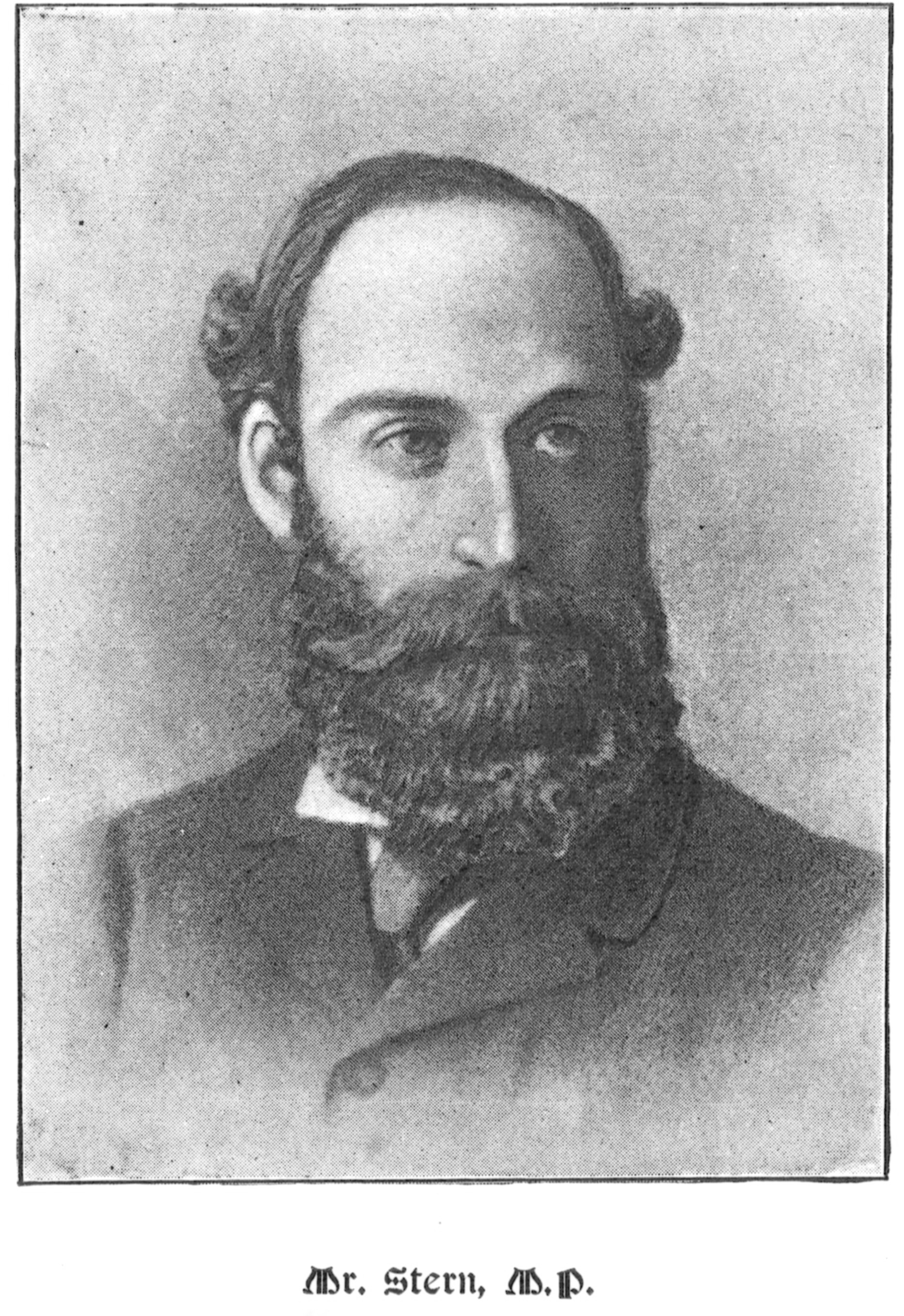
Pictured in Suffolk Celebrities, 1893

For some time Stern worked in his father's firm of Stern Brothers. He unsuccessfully contested the Middle Division of Surrey in 1880 and 1884, Tiverton in 1885 and Ipswich in 1886 but was finally elected as MP for Stowmarket in a by-election in 1891. On 19 July 1895 he was raised to the peerage as Baron Wandsworth, of Wandsworth in the County of London (he also held a Portuguese viscountcy by right of his father). His elevation to the peerage was a quid pro quo for donations he had made to Gladstone. The then Liberal Prime Minister Lord Rosebery was only willing to fulfill that promise (given his own commitment to Lords reform) after receiving a written request from Gladstone that he honour the deal. He was one of the relatively small number of Liberal peers to identify themselves as Liberal Imperialists.

He was a Justice of the Peace for Surrey and London, and served as vice-president of the London and Counties Radical Union. He was appointed the Honorary Colonel of the 4th Volunteer Battalion, East Surrey Regiment, on 16 February 1889 He provided the land for the battalion's new drill hall at 27 St John's Hill, Clapham Junction, opened in 1902.

== Personal life ==
Lord Wandsworth died at his London home, 10 Great Stanhope Street, Mayfair, on 10 February 1912, when the barony became extinct. He left an estate of nearly £1,555,985, most of which was bequeathed to charity, over a million being given to found the Lord Wandsworth Orphanage. In 1920 (after delays caused by World War I) the orphanage's trustees opened a preparatory school for boys and girls between 5 and 12 years old at Gosden House in Bramley, Surrey. Under the terms of Lord Wandsworth's will, preference was given to the children of agricultural labourers from his former constituency in the north-western or Stowmarket parliamentary division of Suffolk. Pupils would leave the school by the age of 13, the girls continuing their education in Guildford while the boys went on to the Lord Wandsworth Agricultural College in Long Sutton, Hampshire, which is now known as Lord Wandsworth College.

Parliament of the United Kingdom
Preceded by Edward Greene	Member of Parliament for Stowmarket; 1891–1895	Succeeded by Ian Malcolm
Peerage of the United Kingdom
New creation	Baron Wandsworth; 1895–1912	Extinct
