= Sir Edward Stern, 1st Baronet =

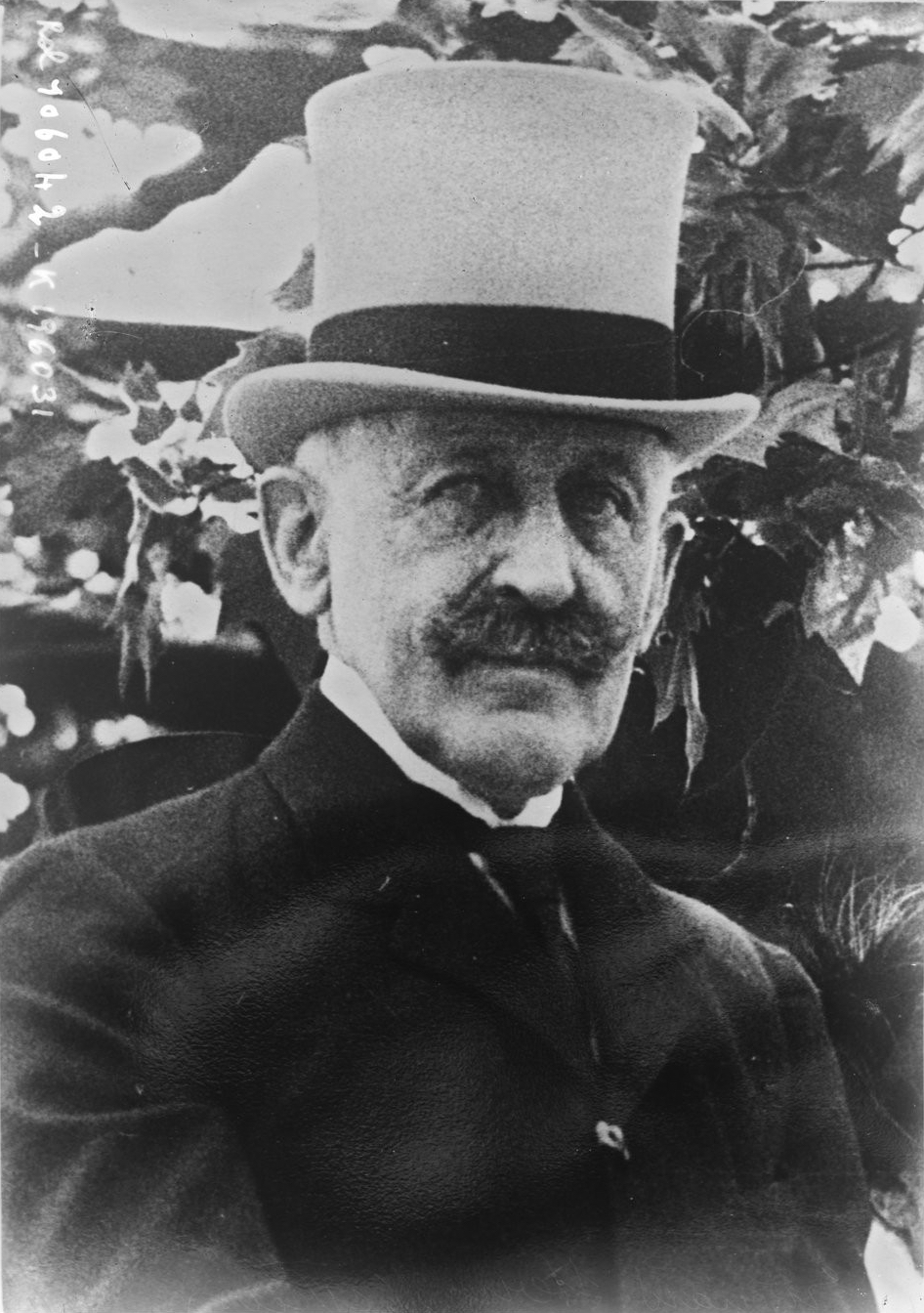
Sir Edward Stern, 1925 photograph

Sir Edward Stern, 1st Baronet (1854–1933) was a British banker, from 1910 senior partner of Stern Brothers.

== Early life and education ==
He was born in London a younger son of David de Stern and his wife Sophia, daughter of Aaron Asher Goldsmid and niece of Isaac Goldsmid; Sydney Stern, 1st Baron Wandsworth was his elder brother. The Sterns "were among the richest of the Anglo-Jewish banking families."

== Banker ==
Stern became a partner in the family Stern Brothers bank when still quite young: perhaps in his 20s. It had a London monopoly of finance for Bulgaria, which formed a government after the Russo-Turkish War of 1877–78. In 1908, Stern Brothers and Ernest Cassel's bank formed the British component of an international consortium making a loan to the Ottoman Empire.

Stern was a member of the board of the London Joint Stock Bank, from 1902. He also acted as director of the Midland Bank.

Sir Edward Stern took over as head of Stern Brothers in 1910, from his cousin Herbert Stern, 1st Baron Michelham. A traditionalist, he was reputedly the last prominent City of London figure to go to work in a horse-drawn carriage. Kynaston calls his leadership "inadequate". Stern Brothers declined after World War I, after which links to family with banks in Paris and Frankfurt were not sustained. Another factor was "very conservative business practices".

== Politics ==
In 1903 Stern supported Joseph Chamberlain's proposed tariff reforms. In 1909 he presided over a Liberal Unionist and Conservative meeting for Surrey.

== Fan Court ==
With a three-storey ornate façade, Fan Court, Chertsey, on the Longcross-Lyne border in north-west Surrey was the principal home of Edward Stern from at latest 1911. A farmer as well as businessman, Stern regularly entered the Chertsey Agricultural Show, until at least 1928.

== Family ==
Stern married, firstly in 1883, Constance Jessel, second daughter of George Jessel. After her death in 1918, he married, secondly in 1925, Sybil Grace Tuck, daughter of Adolph Tuck.

== Legacy ==
The Sir Edward Stern Scholarship at the University of London was founded to support students with an interest in commerce. It was awarded from 1921.

== Carriage driving ==
Stern listed "coaching" as one of his recreations in Who's Who, with hunting, and his New York Times obituary in 1933 stated that "Until recently he was daily seen driving his phaeton and pair to business." He was adept and competitive in four-in-hand driving, with a noted team of hackney horses that were blue roans, in 1924 taking part in the Hyde Park, London to Richmond Marathon. For the Coaching Club meet in summer 1900 in Hyde Park, he had brought to the social occasion a large party including Amy Coleridge and Viscountess Parker, mother of George Parker, 7th Earl of Macclesfield.

== Awards and honours ==
Stern was High Sheriff of Surrey in 1904.

=== Knighthood and baronetcy ===
Escutcheon of Sir Edward Stern

Stern was knighted in 1904, and created a baronet, of Chertsey, on 16 June 1922. He left no children, and the baronetcy became extinct on 17 April 1933 with his death.
