= List of British Jews =

List of British Jews is a list of prominent Jews from the United Kingdom and its predecessor states.

Although the first Jews may have arrived on the island of Great Britain with the Romans, it was not until the Norman Conquest of William the Conqueror in 1066 that organised Jewish communities first appeared in England. These existed until 1290 when the Jewish population of England was expelled by King Edward I of England.

There was never a corresponding expulsion from Scotland. The eminent scholar David Daiches states in his autobiographical Two Worlds: A Scottish born Jewish Childhood that there are grounds for saying that Scotland is the only Immigrant country with no history of state persecution of Jews.

Jews were re-admitted to England and Wales in 1656 by Oliver Cromwell. Slightly more than 200 years later, in 1858 they were emancipated, that is, accepted as full citizens. In the late 19th century, there was mass Jewish immigration to England from Russia due to Russian domestic policy. In the 1930s, the country accepted many refugees from Nazism. The Jewish population peaked at 450,000, but has since declined due to low birth-rate, intermarriage and emigration, mainly of the younger generation to Israel. According to the 2001 census, the current population is around 295,000, most of whom live in London. The number of people who identified as Jews in the United Kingdom rose by just under 4% between 2001 and 2021.

== Academic figures ==
=== Scientists ===
See List of British Jewish scientists, which includes economists.

=== Historians ===
- David Abulafia, professor of history, University of Cambridge
- Geoffrey Alderman, historian
- Richard David Barnett, museum curator and archaeologist
- Norman Cohn, historian
- Isaac Deutscher, historian
- Geoffrey Rudolph Elton, historian
- Samuel Finer
- Sir Moses I. Finley, historian and sociologist
- Sir Martin Gilbert, historian
- Martin Goodman
- Philip Guedalla, biographer
- Eric Hobsbawm, historian and Communist theoretician
- Jonathan Israel, historian
- Joseph Jacobs, editor of the Jewish Encyclopedia
- Lisa Jardine, historian
- Tony Judt, Director of the Erich Maria Remarque Institute at New York University
- Elie Kedourie, historian and political scientist
- Otto Kurz, historian
- Bernard Lewis, historian
- David Malcolm Lewis, professor of history, University of Oxford
- Hyam Maccoby, professor of history
- Sir Philip Magnus, 1st Baronet, educationalist and politician
- Sir Philip Magnus-Allcroft, 2nd Baronet, biographer
- Shula Marks, expert on African history
- Arnaldo Momigliano, professor of history, University College London
- Lewis Bernstein Namier, historian (converted to Anglicanism)
- Sir Francis Palgrave (born Cohen) (1768–1861), historian
- Ilan Pappé Israeli born New Historian, author of The Ethnic Cleansing of Palestine and professor at The University of Exeter
- Sir Michael Postan, historian
- Cecil Roth, historian and editor of the Encyclopaedia Judaica
- Simon Schama, historian
- Leonard Schapiro, historian
- Simon Sebag Montefiore, historian
- Charles Singer, historian of science
- Sir Aurel Stein, archeologist
- Barry Supple, economic historian
- Geza Vermes

=== Medical ===
- Sir George Alberti, President, Royal College of Physicians
- Asher Asher, first Scottish Jewish doctor
- Henry Cohen, 1st Baron Cohen of Birkenhead, President of the Royal Society of Medicine
- Professor Andrew Eder, dentist, clinical academic, strategic board adviser, and charity trustee
- Sir Ian Gainsford, dentist
- Sir Abraham Goldberg, Regius Professor of Medicine, University of Glasgow, 1923–2007
- Max Hamilton, psychiatrist
- Roderigo Lopez, New Christian doctor to Queen Elizabeth I
- John Henry Marks, former chairman of the British Medical Association
- Sir Jonathan Miller, physician and theatre director
- Leslie Turnberg, Baron Turnberg, professor, FMedSci
- Oliver Zangwill, professor of psychology

=== Philosophers ===
- Samuel Alexander, professor of philosophy at Manchester, born in Australia, the first Jewish fellow of an Oxbridge college
- Sir Alfred Ayer, philosopher, populariser of logical positivism (Jewish mother)
- Sir Isaiah Berlin, political philosopher
- Max Black, philosopher
- Gerald Cohen, Oxford professor of philosophy
- Laurence Jonathan Cohen, Oxford professor of philosophy
- Ernest Gellner, philosopher social scientist
- H. L. A. Hart, legal philosopher
- Brian Klug, Senior Research Fellow in Philosophy, St Benet's Hall, University of Oxford; concepts of race, antisemitism, Islamophobia, Jewish identity
- Stephan Korner, Bristol professor of philosophy
- Imre Lakatos, Hungarian-born philosopher
- Alexander Piatigorsky, philosopher, Buddhologist, writer
- Sir Karl Popper, philosopher of science (family became Lutheran)
- Jonathan Romain, minister of Maidenhead Jewish community and leader of the British reform movement
- Richard Rudolf Walzer
- Ludwig Wittgenstein, philosopher; Jewish grandparents on both sides of the family who had converted to Christianity in the 19th century; he was christened, raised and eventually buried as a Catholic
- Richard Wollheim

=== Social scientists ===
- Roy Clive Abraham, linguist
- Michael Balint, psychoanalyst (converted to Unitarianism)
- Zygmunt Bauman, sociologist
- Basil Bernstein, linguist
- Vernon Bogdanor, professor of politics
- Gerald Cohen, professor of social and political theory
- Arthur Lumley Davids, linguist and orientalist
- Norbert Elias, sociologist
- Herman Finer, political scientist
- Samuel Finer, political scientist
- Sir Moses I. Finley, historian and sociologist
- Meyer Fortes, anthropologist
- Eduard Fraenkel, philologist
- Anna Freud, child psychoanalyst
- Norman Geras, professor of government
- Morris Ginsberg, sociologist
- Max Gluckman, anthropologist
- Theodor Goldstücker, orientalist
- Jean Gottmann, professor of geography, Oxford University
- Julius Gould, sociologist
- David Hirsh, lecturer in sociology
- Paul Hirst, social theorist (Jewish mother)
- Marie Jahoda, psychology of discrimination
- Melanie Klein, child psychoanalyst
- Geoffrey Lewis Lewis, professor of Turkish
- Steven Lukes, political scientist
- Ashley Montagu, anthropologist and humanist
- Isaac Schapera, anthropologist
- Edward Ullendorff, linguist

=== Theologians and Hebraists ===
- Isaac Abendana, Hebraist
- Chimen Abramsky, professor of Hebrew
- Lionel Barnett, orientalist
- Abraham Benisch, Hebraist and editor of the Jewish Chronicle
- Immanuel Oscar Menahem Deutsch, Semitic scholar and orientalist
- Alfred Edersheim, Bible scholar
- Philip Ferdinand, professor of Hebrew
- Christian David Ginsburg, expert on the Masoretic Text
- Ridley Haim Herschell, missionary
- Marcus Kalisch, Hebraist and Biblical commentator
- David Levi, Jewish scholar
- David Samuel Margoliouth, orientalist (family converted to Anglicanism)
- Hugh Montefiore, bishop
- Adolf Neubauer, Hebraist
- Stefan Reif, Cambridge academic
- Judah Segal, professor of Semitic languages
- Joseph Wolff, missionary

=== Others ===
- Sidney Greenbaum, Quain Professor of English Language and Literature, University College London 1983–90

== Artists ==
=== Fine arts ===
- Frank Auerbach, painter
- Edith Birkin, painter
- David Bomberg, painter
- Sir Anthony Caro, sculptor
- Benno Elkan, sculptor
- Sir Jacob Epstein, sculptor (UK-based)
- Hannah Frank, artist and sculptor
- Barnett Freedman, artist
- Lucian Freud, painter
- Abram Games
- Mark Gertler, painter
- Zoltán Glass, photographer
- Gluck (Hannah Gluckstein), artist
- Walter Goodman, painter
- Dora Gordine, artist and sculptor
- Harrison Marks, photographer
- Solomon Alexander Hart, painter
- Lily Delissa Joseph, painter
- Anish Kapoor, sculptor (Jewish mother)
- R. B. Kitaj, US-born painter
- Leon Kossoff, 1926–2019 (The Guardian Leon Kossoff obituary)
- Jacob Kramer, painter
- Lennie Lee, Young British Artist; mixed media
- Horatio Joseph Lucas, painter
- Linda McCartney, photographer
- Ruth Rix, painter
- Sir William Rothenstein
- Antony Armstrong-Jones, 1st Earl of Snowdon
- Isaac Snowman, painter
- Solomon Joseph Solomon, painter
- Alfred Wolmark, painter
- Berthold Wolpe, printer

=== Designers and architects ===
- Nicole Farhi, fashion designer
- John Frieda, hair stylist; father of actor Jordan Frieda
- Ray Kelvin, fashion designer, founder of Ted Baker
- Denys Lasdun, architect
- Stella McCartney, fashion designer
- Erich Mendelsohn, architect
- Janet Reger, lingerie designer
- Vidal Sassoon, hair stylist
- Richard Seifert, architect

== Arts and literature ==
- Sir Israel Gollancz, Shakespeare expert
- Sir Ernst Gombrich, art historian
- Sir Sidney Lee, editor of the Dictionary of National Biography and Shakespeare expert
- Siegbert Salomon Prawer, professor of German
- Sir Nicholas Serota, director of the Tate Gallery, 1988–2017
- Ernest Simon, professor of Chinese
- Arthur Waley, poet, translator of Chinese and Japanese literature

=== Performing arts ===
See List of British Jewish entertainers (includes classical musicians and actors as "entertainers").

=== Writers ===
See List of British Jewish writers.

== Business and the professions ==
=== Civil service ===
- Abraham Manie Adelstein, government statistician
- Sir Hermann Bondi, Chief Scientific Adviser to the Ministry of Defence and the Department of Energy
- Sir Andrew Cohen, colonial administrator
- Eugene Grebenik, first head of the Civil Service College
- Hans Kronberger, nuclear physicist
- Sir Alan Marre, Second Permanent Secretary, Health; later Parliamentary Commissioner for Administration
- Sir Claus Moser, Lord Moser, government statistician

=== Finance ===
- Sir Ernest Cassel, banker
- Sir Ronald Cohen, Egypt-born businessman and Labour party supporter
- Moses da Costa, also called Anthony da Costa
- Abraham and Benjamin Goldsmid, brothers, leading financiers and philanthropists
- Sir Isaac Lyon Goldsmid, financier, a leading figure in Jewish emancipation and in the foundation of University College London
- Desmond Hirshfield, Baron Hirshfield, chartered accountant and financial adviser to Trade Unions
- Dudley Joel, financier
- Solomon Joel, financier
- Lord Levene of Portsoken, Peter Keith Levene, chairman of Lloyd's of London, Lord Mayor of London (1998–1999)
- Aaron of Lincoln, 12th-century financier
- Moses Haim Montefiore, financier and philanthropist
- Nathan Mayer Rothschild, financier and banker
- Joseph Salvador, first Jewish director of the British East India Company
- Barons Swaythling, bankers
- Samuel Montagu, 1st Baron Swaythling

=== Law ===
- Sir John Balcombe, Lord Justice of Appeal
- Judah P. Benjamin, American exile, lawyer
- Herbert Bentwich, lawyer and Zionist leader
- Norman Bentwich, lawyer and Attorney-General of Palestine; son of Herbert Benwitch
- His Honour Gerald Butler, Q.C., judge
- Alex Carlile, Baron Carlile of Berriew, QC (former Liberal Democrat MP and peer, now independent from 2017)
- Arthur Cohen, QC and politician
- Lionel Cohen, Baron Cohen, Lord of Appeal
- Myrella Cohen, judge, QC and agunah campaigner
- Lawrence Collins, Baron Collins of Mapesbury, Justice of the Supreme Court of the United Kingdom
- Hazel Cosgrove, Lady Cosgrove, Scottish Queen's Counsel and sheriff
- David Daube, professor of law
- The Hon Sir Bernard Eder, former High Court judge
- Dawn Freedman, former circuit judge
- Dame Hazel Genn
- Sir Francis Henry Goldsmid, MP for Reading, first Jewish barrister (Q.C. 1858)
- Sir David Lionel Goldsmid-Stern-Salomons, barrister
- Peter Goldsmith, Baron Goldsmith, Attorney General
- Arthur Lehman Goodhart, jurist
- William Goodhart, Baron Goodhart, human rights lawyer and politician (son of Arthur Goodhart)
- Arnold Goodman, Baron Goodman, solicitor
- Dame Rose Heilbron, Britain's first female Q.C., judge
- Rosalyn Higgins, President of the International Court of Justice
- Rufus Isaacs, 1st Marquess of Reading, lawyer and politician
- Sir George Jessel, Solicitor General for England and Wales, later Master of the Rolls
- Anthony Julius, prominent lawyer for Princess Diana, and against David Irving
- Neville Laski, judge
- Hersch Lauterpacht
- Brian Leveson, Lord Justice of Appeal
- Leone Levi, barrister and statistician
- George Henry Lewis,
- Gavin Lightman, judge; son of Harold Lightman
- Harold Lightman, barrister, father of Gavin Lightman and Stafford Lightman
- Sir Alan Mocatta, judge
- Victor Mishcon, Baron Mishcon, solicitor
- David Neuberger, Baron Neuberger of Abbotsbury, Justice of the Supreme Court of the United Kingdom; son of Albert Neuberger, brother of James Neuberger and Michael Neuberger, and brother-in-law of Julia Neuberger
- David Pannick, Baron Pannick, barrister and House of Lords crossbencher
- David Pearl, judge
- Nicholas Phillips, Baron Phillips of Worth Matravers, President of the Supreme Court of the United Kingdom
- Sir Bernard Rix, Lord Justice of Appeal (2000–2013)
- Leonard Sainer, solicitor and retailer
- Cyril Salmon, Judge
- Fiona Shackleton, solicitor who has acted for the royal family and Paul McCartney
- Lewis Silkin, 1st Baron Silkin, solicitor
- Victoria Starmer, English solicitor and spouse of the British prime minister
- Linda Joy Stern, Q.C., prosecutor and judge
- Julius Stone
- Eldred Tabachnik, Q.C., former president of the Board of Deputies of British Jews
- Peter Taylor, Baron Taylor of Gosforth, Q.C., former Lord Chief Justice
- Vivian Wineman, former president of the Board of Deputies of British Jews
- Harry Woolf, Baron Woolf, former Lord Chief Justice, Q.C., former Master of the Rolls

=== Manufacturing ===
- Sir Leon Bagrit, pioneer of automation
- Sir Monty Finniston, industrialist
- David Gestetner, inventor
- Joseph Kagan, Baron Kagan, clothes manufacturer and disgraced friend of Prime Minister Harold Wilson
- Sir Emmanuel Kaye, industrialist and philanthropist
- Lord Alan Sugar, founder and chairman of Amstrad (1968–2007)
- Sir Robert Waley-Cohen, industrialist
- Arnold Weinstock, Lord Weinstock, Chairman of GEC

=== Media ===
- Emma Barnett, radio presenter
- Rachel Beer, newspaper editor
- Rafael Behr, journalist
- Sidney Bernstein, cinema owner
- Benjamin Cohen, Channel 4 News reporter and presenter
- Richard Desmond, publisher, Chairman of the Daily Express Group
- André Deutsch, publisher
- Jonathan Freedland, journalist and author
- Hadley Freeman, journalist
- Tanya Gold, journalist
- Lew Grade, founder of ATV
- Michael Grade, Chairman of the BBC from 2004 to 2006 and executive chairman of ITV plc from 2007 to 2009.
- Michael Green, founder of Carlton Television
- Miles Jacobson OBE, owner and founder of Sports Interactive and inventor of Football Manager
- Sydney Jacobson, newspaper editor
- Jonathan Josephs, TV reporter
- Natasha Kaplinsky, newsreader, TV presenter
- Joseph Moses Levy, owner of the Daily Telegraph
- Edward Levy-Lawson, 1st Baron Burnham, newspaper proprietor
- Robert Maxwell, publisher
- Suzy Menkes, fashion journalist
- Victoria Coren Mitchell, writer, presenter and professional poker player
- David Patrikarakos, journalist
- Robert Peston, TV reporter
- Melanie Phillips, journalist
- Stephen Pollard, editor and journalist
- Gail Rebuck, publisher [www.independent.co.uk/life-style/interview-gail-warning-1154352.html]
- Paul Reuter, founder of Reuters
- Rachel Riley, television presenter and co-host of Countdown
- Jacob Rothschild, 4th Baron Rothschild, Non-Executive Deputy Chairman of the Board, British SKY Broadcasting Group PLC
- Joshua Rozenberg, journalist
- Maurice Saatchi, Baron Saatchi and Charles Saatchi, founders of Saatchi and Saatchi
- Richard Sharp (BBC chairman), BBC chairman
- Martin Sorrell, founder of the WPP Group
- George Weidenfeld, publisher

=== Military ===
- Sir Edward Brampton, godson of King Edward IV, a knight and commander during the War of the Roses
- Frank Alexander de Pass, World War I British Indian Army Victoria Cross recipient
- Albert Goldsmid, colonel
- Frederick John Goldsmid, general
- Thomas William Gould, World War II Royal Navy Victoria Cross recipient
- John Patrick Kenneally, World War II British Army Victoria Cross recipient (Jewish father)
- Issy Smith, World War I British Army Victoria Cross recipient
- Peter Stevens, World War II bomber pilot/POW and recipient of the Military Cross for numerous escape activities; a German-Jewish refugee living in London at the outbreak of hostilities; born Georg Franz HEIN in Hanover; committed identity theft in order to join the RAF; was naturalized a British citizen in 1946
- Wing Commander Roland Robert Stanford Tuck, DSO, DFC and Two Bars, AFC (1916–1987), RAF fighter pilot, Battle of Britain and Battle of France (27 air-to-air kills), English Electric Canberra test pilot
- Jack White, World War I British Army Victoria Cross recipient

=== Property ===
- Jack Cotton, property developer
- David Garrard, property developer
- Poju Zabludowicz, owner of Tamares Group

=== Retail ===
- David Alliance, Baron Alliance, businessman and Liberal Democrat politician
- Sir Victor Blank, chairman of GUS
- Sir Montague Burton, retailer
- Sir Charles Clore, owner of Selfridges
- Jack Cohen, founder of Tesco
- Ralph and David Gold, founders of Ann Summers and co-owners of Birmingham City football club
- Sir Philip Green, owner of Bhs, Arcadia Group
- Irene Howard, English costume designer; sister of actor Leslie Howard
- Stanley Kalms, now Baron Kalms of Edgware, life president of Dixons Group PLC
- Bernard Lewis, founder of River Island
- David Lewis, department store founder
- Michael Marks, co-founder of Marks & Spencer (born in the Russian Empire)
- Simon Marks, chairman of Marks & Spencer
- Gerald Ronson, business tycoon and philanthropist
- Marcus Samuel, founder of the "Shell" Transport and Trading Company
- Israel Sieff, chairman of Marks & Spencer
- Joseph Stillitz, founder and chairman of Gor-Ray
- Lord Alan Sugar, founder of Amstrad and star of The Apprentice (UK)
- Isaac Wolfson, founder of GUS plc; philanthropist

== Police ==
- Henry Solomon, Chief Constable of Brighton Borough 1838 to 1844

== Political figures ==
See List of British Jewish politicians.

== Religious and communal leaders ==
- Jacob Abendana, Haham of the Spanish and Portuguese Jews
- Barnett Abrahams, Dayan, principal of Jews' College
- Israel Abrahams, scholar and educator
- Yehezkel Abramsky, rabbi and dayan
- Hermann Adler, Chief Rabbi
- Nathan Marcus Adler, Chief Rabbi
- Benjamin Artom, Haham of the Spanish and Portuguese Jews
- Rabbi Dr. Tony Bayfield, head of the Movement for Reform Judaism
- Leo Baeck, German-born rabbi, scholar, theologian
- Jon Benjamin, Chief Executive, Board of Deputies of British Jews
- Moses Berlin, 19th-century British Reform rabbi
- Lionel Blue, Reform rabbi and broadcaster
- Shmuley Boteach, American-born Orthodox rabbi, author, and TV and radio host
- Sir Israel Brodie, Chief Rabbi
- Felix Carlebach, German-born rabbi
- Eli Cashdan, rabbi
- Albert Chait, rabbi and broadcaster, Leeds
- Isidore Epstein, rabbi, principal of Jews' College
- Harry Freedman, rabbi
- Moses Gaster, Haham of the Spanish and Portuguese Jews
- Sir Hermann Gollancz, rabbi and educator
- Aaron Hart, Chief Rabbi
- Joseph H. Hertz, Chief Rabbi
- Shmuel Yitzchak Hillman, rabbi and dayan
- Solomon Hirschell, Chief Rabbi
- Moses Hyamson, acting Chief Rabbi
- Louis Jacobs, rabbi and educator
- Laura Janner-Klausner, Senior Rabbi of the Movement for Reform Judaism
- Immanuel Jakobovits, Baron Jakobovits, Chief Rabbi
- Nathan S. Joseph
- Casriel Dovid Kaplin, rabbi and dayan
- James Kennard, rabbi and educationalist
- Gertrude Golda Lowy, suffragist and member of the Jewish League for Woman Suffrage
- Hart Lyon, Chief Rabbi
- Neil Stuart Martin, CBE, community leader and youth charity executive
- Frederick de Sola Mendes, rabbi
- Solomon Mestel, British rabbi
- Ewen Montagu, President of the United Synagogue
- Claude Montefiore, lay synagogue leader
- Julia Neuberger, Reform rabbi
- David Nieto, Haham of the Spanish and Portuguese Jews
- Isaac Nieto, Haham of the Spanish and Portuguese Jews
- Michael Plaskow, minister
- Jonathan Romain, rabbi
- Sir Anthony Rothschild, first president of the United Synagogue
- Lord Jonathan Sacks, Chief Rabbi
- Solomon Marcus Schiller-Szinessy, rabbi and first Jewish professor in Cambridge
- Elyakim Schlesinger, rabbi
- Joseph ben Yehuda Leib Shapotshnick, rabbi
- Simeon Singer, rabbi
- Simon Waley Waley, lay leader
- Chaim Weizmann, Zionist leader
- Jonathan Wittenberg, Masorti rabbi

== Philanthropists ==
- Bernhard Baron, cigarette maker and philanthropist
- Sir Clive Bourne, philanthropist
- Dame Vivien Duffield, philanthropist, daughter of Sir Charles Clore
- Joseph Duveen, 1st Baron Duveen of Millbank
- Anna Maria Goldsmid, philanthropist
- Sir Basil Henriques, philanthropist
- Maurice de Hirsch, banker and philanthropist
- Samuel Lewis, financier and philanthropist
- Sir Robert Mayer, philanthropist
- Frederic David Mocatta, philanthropist

== Miscellaneous ==
- Diana Barnato Walker, first British woman to break the sound barrier
- Barney Barnato, diamond miner
- Jack Beddington, advertising executive
- Neil Blair, literary agent
- William Buzaglo, self-proclaimed inventor
- Antonio Fernandez Carvajal, merchant, first Jew to be naturalised as a British citizen
- Jeremiah Duggan, possible murder victim
- Brian Epstein (1934–1967), music entrepreneur who discovered and managed the Beatles
- Michael Foster, talent agent
- Alexander Goldberg, human rights activist, chaplain and barrister
- Henry Edward Goldsmid, East India Company servant
- Kurt Hahn, educationalist
- Nathaniel Isaacs, explorer
- Aaron Kosminski, suspect in the Jack the Ripper case
- Gottlieb Wilhelm Leitner (1840–1899), educationist and orientalist
- Sir Solomon de Medina, army contractor, first English Jew to be knighted
- Nigella Lawson, celebrity chef
- Chava Mond, model
- Dorrit Moussaieff, Israeli-British businesswoman, entrepreneur, philanthropist and the First Lady of Iceland
- Yotam Ottolenghi, celebrity chef, food writer
- Don Pacifico, cause of the Pacifico incident
- Krystyna Skarbek, spy
- Sir Bernard Waley-Cohen, Lord Mayor of London
- Jerelle Jules, rights activist known for challenging discriminatory grooming policies at The Ritz Hotel.
- Ivor Goldsmid Samuel Montagu, Soviet spy, filmmaker, table tennis champion

== See also ==
- History of the Jews in England
- History of the Jews in Scotland
- History of the Jews in Ireland
- List of British Jewish entertainers
- List of British Jewish nobility and gentry
- List of British Jewish politicians
- List of British Jewish scientists
- List of British Jewish sportspeople
- List of British Jewish writers
- Lists of Jews
- List of Britons
