= Alice Lucas (poet) =

British writer (1851-1935)

- Born: Alice Julia Montefiore; 2 August 1851; Kensington, Middlesex, England
- Died: 25 March 1935 (aged 83); London, England
- Spouse: Henry Lucas (m. 1873; died 1910)
- Children: Nathaniel Sampson Lucas
- Relatives: Claude Montefiore (brother); Sir Moses Montefiore (paternal great-uncle)

Alice Julia Lucas (née Montefiore) (2 August 1851 – 25 March 1935) was a British Jewish poet, translator, and communal worker.

== Biography ==
Alice Julia Montefiore was born in 1851, the elder daughter of Nathaniel M. Montefiore and Emma Goldsmid. Alongside her brother Claude Montefiore, she studied Judaism under Solomon Schechter at the Hochschule in Berlin. On 24 April 1873 she married barrister Henry Lucas, who later served as treasurer and vice-president of the United Synagogue. In 1900 she helped establish the Jewish Study Society, modelled after the Council of Jewish Women, of which she served as the first president. Lucas also sat on the women's committee of the Westminster Jews' Free School and its preparatory nursery, the Jews' Infant School.

== Work ==
Alice Lucas's first book was Translations from the German Poets of the 18th and 19th Centuries (1876), containing English translations of compositions by Goethe, Heine, Schiller, among others. She later published The Children's Pentateuch (1878) and a translation of David Cassel's Leitfaden für den Untericht in der jüdischen Geschichte und Literatur (1883), textbooks for children on the Torah and Jewish history, respectively.

Lucas regularly published translations of poetry from medieval Hebrew and Talmudic sources in the pages of the Jewish Quarterly Review, the Jewish Chronicle, and other periodicals. Her Songs of Zion by Hebrew Singers of Mediæval Times (1894) includes both original poetry and translations of medieval Hebrew hyms, and provides a poem for every Shabbat of the year as well as feasts and fasts. Her translation work culminated in the publication of The Jewish Year: A Collection of Devotional Poems for Sabbaths and Holidays Throughout the Year (1898, revised 1926), a response to John Keble's popular The Christian Year. The volume contains original works, translations from medieval Hebrew poetry, poetic renderings of Talmudic legends, and re-workings of poems from the siddur, organized by reference to the weekly Torah portion.

== Selected bibliography ==
- Lucas, Alice (1908). Talmudic Legends, Hymns & Paraphrases. London: Chatto & Windus.
- Lucas, Alice; Abrahams, Israel (1903). Hebrew Lesson Book, Being an Introduction to Mr. David Yellin's Method of Teaching Hebrew. London: T. Fisher Unwin.
- Lucas, Alice (1901). "Hebrew Melodies". In Barclay, Joseph; S. L. MacGregor, Mathers; Lucas, Alice (eds.). Hebrew Literature; Comprising Talmudic Treatises, Hebrew Melodies and the Kabbalah Unveiled. London: The Colonial Press. pp. 365–400.
- Lucas, Alice (1898). The Jewish Year: A Collection of Devotional Poems for Sabbaths and Holidays Throughout the Year. London: MacMillan and Co.
- Lucas, Alice (1894). Songs of Zion by Hebrew Singers of Mediæval Times. London: J. M. Dent & Co.
- Cassel, David (1883). Manual of Jewish History and Literature. Translated by Lucas, Alice. London: Macmillan and Co.
- Lucas, Alice (1878). The Children's Pentateuch, with the Haphtorahs or Portions of the Prophets. London: Trübner & Co.
- Lucas, Alice (1876). Translations from the German Poets of the 18th and 19th Centuries. London: Henry S. King & Co.
