= Simeon Singer =

English rabbi

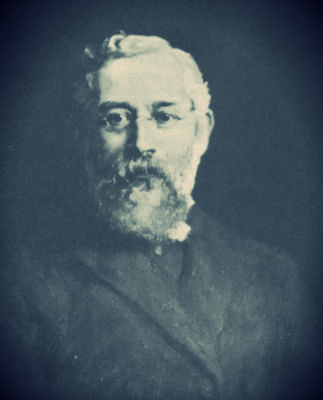
Simeon Singer, a portrait by Solomon Joseph Solomon

Simeon Singer (1846–1906) was an English Rabbi, preacher, lecturer and public worker. He is best known for his English translation of the siddur, the Authorised Daily Prayer Book, informally known as the "Singer's Siddur".

== Biography ==
=== Personal life and education ===
Singer was born in London in 1846 to a Hungarian father and English mother. At age 8 (1855) his mother took him to visit Raab, Hungary. She believed he would get a better education there, but shortly after their arrival she contracted cholera and died within 24 hours. Simeon remained there a few months with family members and then returned to London. He "possessed an exceptional mind", and at the age of 13 he was the recipient of the Barnett Myers Scholarship, allowing him to study.

He became a student at the Day School of Jews' College, which had only recently been founded in 1855. The curriculum of the school was wide and in addition to Biblical Hebrew, included English, French, German, as well as Mathematics and Science. Singer thus spoke German and French fluently, and some Italian, acquired a working knowledge of Latin and Greek, and was generally well-educated in the arts and sciences.

He later moved into the College itself, when he decided to enter the Ministry. His studies there were interrupted by the death of its principal, the Rev Barnett Abrahams. Singer was then fortunate to be taught by the new principal, Dr Michael Friedländer, who "took a kindly interest in young Singer". In 1867, whilst still a student, he became part-time minister, and combined this with teaching at the Day School, where he was for a time headmaster. He remained at Jews' College for 12 more years.

In 1890 he received his Semicha (the Rabbinical Diploma) from Rabbi Isaac Hirsch Weiss of Vienna, author of Dor Dor v'Dor'shav. He underwent a series of written and oral examinations, spending two months there "being rigorously examined". Singer had begun rabbinical studies with Dayan Jacob Reinowitz of the London Beth Din in 1879, eventually following a "demanding three-year course of study" with Weiss; he visited the Continent often and spent much time either with Weiss, or studying by himself under Weiss' guidance.

On returning to England, Singer did not demand that his title be changed to "Rabbi", and he continued to be called "Reverend". Relatedly, "he evidenced his self-denial" by declining to stand for the post of associate Chief Rabbi following the death of Chief Rabbi Adler.

He married Charlotte Pyke in 1867. They had six children: Jules, Samuel, David, Richard, Charles and Freda. His son was the historian Charles Singer; Israel Abrahams was his son-in-law.

=== Career ===
In 1867, at age 21, he became minister of the Borough Synagogue in Walworth, London (now closed; amalgamated with Brixton Synagogue, 1961). As above, during this time he taught at Jews' College School full-time, and was, for a time, its headmaster. He moved to the New West End Synagogue in 1878 and remained the minister there until his death. As a preacher "Singer showed rare gifts". His pulpit addresses in general won wide appreciation, and his services were often called for at public functions. He was the first to introduce regular sermons to children. "Despite his devotion to public work", Singer published some important works; see below

He was "a power in the community in the direction of moderate progress"; he was "a lover of tradition, yet at the same time he recognized the necessity of well-considered changes". In 1892 at his instigation the first English Conference of Jewish Preachers was held, and some reforms were then and at other times introduced, such as the introduction of Bible Readings in English, the admission of women as choristers and the inclusion of the express consent of the bride as well as the bridegroom at the marriage ceremony. He did much to reunite Conservatives and Liberals in the community, and he himself preached at the Reform Synagogue in Manchester.

He had no love for the minute critical analysis of the Bible, but he was attracted to the theory of progressive revelation, and thus was favourably disposed to the modern treatment of the Old Testament. His "cheery optimism was at the basis of this attitude", and strongly coloured his belief in the Messianic ideals. He "held aloof... from all Zionist schemes", believing in the restoration of Israel to the Promised Land but nonetheless having doubts about political Zionism. His interest in the fortunes of foreign Jews led him to make several continental journeys on their behalf; he was one of the leading spirits of the Russo-Jewish Committee, of the Jewish Association for the Protection of Girls and Women and of other philanthropic organisations.

== Works ==
Singer's most famous work was his new edition and English translation of the Authorized Daily Prayer Book (published in 1890), a work which has gone through many large editions, and which has probably been the most popular (both with Jews and Christians) of any book published by an English Jew. The Hebrew text was that of Seligman Baer's classic Avodat Yisrael, to which Singer provided an "authorised" version of the liturgy capable of standardising and stabilising the synagogue service and helping to create an "established" Judaism in Britain and the Commonwealth (the so-called "Minhag Anglia".)

The Siddur was expanded in 1917 under Chief Rabbi Joseph Hertz; 1934 saw a "continuous" version, minimising the need for cross-reference, and which also incorporated additional material. The 1962 Second Edition, under Chief Rabbi Israel Brodie, was completely re-typeset; also, the translation was amended where it had become unclear or archaic, and further additional material had been introduced. The Centenary Edition of 1990 saw an extensively revised translation by Rabbi Eli Cashdan and also included a series of explanatory notes by Chief Rabbi Lord Jakobovits. In 2006, Chief Rabbi Jonathan Sacks penned a new translation, with commentary, instructions, laws & rubrics; this Fourth Edition formed the basis for the Koren Sacks Siddur published 2009.

This Siddur – in its various editions – has remained the standard prayer book for most orthodox Jews in Great Britain, and for many in the Commonwealth and is still informally known as the "Singer's Siddur." In 1915 the Bloch Publishing Company published an American version, The Standard Prayer Book, which was widely used until the introduction of Philip Birnbaum's Ha-Siddur Ha-Shalem in 1949.

In 1896 the Cambridge University Press published Talmudical Fragments in the Bodleian Library of which Singer was joint author with Solomon Schechter.

Israel Abrahams had access to all of his manuscripts and, after Singer's death, produced three volumes of his literary remains (1908). In 1914, Abrahams also published an annotated edition of Singer's Siddur, with "Historical and Explanatory Notes".

== See also ==
- List of British Jews
- Siddur § Popular siddurim
- Joseph Diggle: in 1897 Singer strongly opposed Diggle's policy at the London School Board, but refused nomination as a member.
- Philip Birnbaum

== External links and references ==
References

- Rabbi Geoffrey L. Shisler, The Life of the Rev Simeon Singer, lecture, March 2004.
- Rabbi Dr. Raymond Apple, Rev Simeon Singer.
- Rabbi Dr. Raymond Apple, Sacks & the Singer Siddur (book review)

Fulltext resources

- The Authorised Daily Prayer Book (translated by Rabbi Simeon Singer, 1890), The Open Siddur Project
- The standard prayer book; authorized English translation by the Rev. S. Singer (1915), archive.org
- Annotated Edition of the Authorised Daily Prayer Book with Historical and Explanatory Notes, and Additional Matter, wikisource.org
- The Literary Remains of the Rev. Simeon Singer, with Memoir, archive.org
- Talmudical Fragments in the Bodleian Library, hebrewbooks.org
