= Moses Berlin =

- Title: Rabbi

Personal life
- Born: 1852
- Died: 1927 (aged 74–75)

Religious life
- Religion: Judaism
- Denomination: Reform Judaism

Rabbi Moses Berlin (1852 – 1927) was a prominent British Reform Jewish rabbi.

== Biography ==
He was born and lived his whole life in Manchester. In 1874, he became Assistant Rabbi at the Manchester Synagogue of British Jews. He became Rabbi in 1885, following the retirement of L. M. Simmons. Moses retired in 1912.

He was a friend of Simeon Singer. In the preface to his prayer book, Singer wrote "My thanks are due to the Chief Rabbi, to Dr. Friedlander, Mr. I. Abrahams, and the Rev. Dr. Berlin for the valuable assistance they have rendered me while the book was passing through the press." His name was removed from the second edition. The reason is unknown, but the name of Claude Montefiore was also removed, to avoid associating the prayer book with the name of someone who had departed from orthodox Judaism,

He assisted Herbert Adler, who said "The Editor's thanks are due to the Rev. B. Berliner and to Dr. M. Berlin for their aid in the correction of the Hebrew proofs." Israel Abrahams also acknowledged his help: "I have had the great advantage of the help of Dr. M. Berlin of Manchester in the correction of the proofs."
