= Taylor-Schechter 16.320 =

Taylor-Schechter 16.320 (T-S 16.320; TM 62154; LDAB 3314; vh236; Rahlfs 2006) is a Greek biblical manuscript written on parchment in codex form. This is a palimpsest that contains the Palestinian Talmud and the Septuagint Psalms. The manuscript is dated 550 – 649 CE.

== Description ==
The upper text of this palimpsest is the Hebrew Palestinian Talmud, Moʿed Qaṭan 82a-b; 83b. The under text is the Septuagint of Psalms 143:1-144:6. Psalmi 143-144 are written in a regular round Biblical majuscule.

The manuscripts is written in one columns per page and contains the Hebrew Tetragram.

The manuscript comes from the Genizah in Egypt and was donated by Solomon Schechter and his patron Charles Taylor in 1898 as part of the Taylor-Schechter Genizah Collection.

== Current location ==
Currently, the manuscript is stored at Cambridge University Library, as Taylor-Schechter 16.320.
