= Zemplínska =

Zemplínska may refer to:

- Zemplínska Široká, village and municipality in Michalovce District in the Kosice Region of eastern Slovakia
- Zemplínska šírava, dam and lake in eastern Slovakia, near the town of Michalovce
- Zemplínska Nová Ves, village and municipality in the Trebišov District in the Košice Region of south-eastern Slovakia
- Zemplínska Teplica, village and municipality in the Trebišov District in the Košice Region of eastern Slovakia
