= Alice Lucas =

Alice Lucas may refer to:

- Alice Lucas (poet) (1851–1935), poet and translator
- Alice Lucas (politician) (1853–1924), parliamentary candidate
