= List of British Jewish politicians =

This is a list of Jews who served as politicians in the United Kingdom and its predecessor states or who were born in the United Kingdom and had notable political careers abroad.

== Jewish party leaders ==
- Benjamin Disraeli (1868–1881) – Leader of the Conservative Party and Prime Minister of the United Kingdom – Converted to Anglicanism at 11
- Herbert Samuel, 1st Viscount Samuel (1931–1935) – Leader of the Liberal Party
- Michael Howard (2003–2005) – Leader of the Conservative Party
- Ed Miliband (2010–2015) – Leader of the Labour Party
- Zack Polanski (2025–present) Leader of the Green Party of England and Wales

== Jewish MPs ==
A law in place until the 1850s stated that no member of the Jewish religion could be elected to Parliament. Some Christian denominations were similarly prohibited. If elected, a member would be excluded if he refused to swear an oath of abjuration with a strong Christian wording.

British Members of Parliament listed chronologically by first election date (in brackets)

=== Pre–1900 ===
- Sampson Eardley (1770–1802) – Father was Jewish. Eardley was baptised. Tory MP.
- Lord George Gordon (1774–1780) – Converted to Judaism
- Manasseh Masseh Lopes (1802–1806, 1807–1808, 1812–1819, 1820–1829) – Lopes converted to Christianity in 1802, and later the same year he entered Parliament as a Tory MP
- Ralph Lopes (1814–1819, 1831–1837, 1841–1847, 1849–1854) – Conservative MP.
- David Ricardo (1819–1823) – Ricardo converted to Christianity in 1793. Whig MP
- David Ricardo (the younger) (1832–1833) – His father had been Jewish, but Ricardo was baptised. Liberal MP
- Benjamin Disraeli (1837–1876)– Conservative MP and Prime Minister of the United Kingdom. Born Jewish but baptised at an early age.
- John Lewis Ricardo (1841–1862) – Liberal MP
- Ralph Bernal Osborne (1841–1874) – His grandfather was Jewish, but Bernal Osborne was baptised. Liberal MP
- Lionel de Rothschild (1847–1868, 1869–1874) – Liberal MP.
- Osman Ricardo (1847–1865) – His father had been Jewish, but Ricardo was baptised. Whig MP.
- David Salomons (1851–1852, 1859–1873) – Liberal MP.
- Massey Lopes (1857–1885) – Conservative MP
- Mayer Amschel de Rothschild (1859–1874) – Liberal MP
- Bernhard Samuelson (1859–1895) – Liberal MP
- Francis Henry Goldsmid (1860–1878) – Liberal MP
- Albert Grant (1865–1868, 1874) – Conservative MP
- Frederick Goldsmid (1865–1866) – Liberal MP
- Nathan Rothschild (1865–1885) – Liberal MP
- Joseph d'Aguilar Samuda (1865–1880) – Liberal MP
- Julian Goldsmid (1866–1896) – Liberal and later Liberal Unionist MP
- Henry Samuelson (1868–1885) – Liberal MP
- George Jessel (1868–1873) – Liberal MP
- Henry Lopes (1868–1876) – Conservative MP
- John Simon (1868–1888) – Liberal MP
- Farrer Herschell (1874–1885) – Liberal MP
- Saul Isaac (1874–1880) – Conservative MP
- Henry Drummond Wolff (1874–1885) – Conservative MP
- Arthur Cohen (1880–1888) – Liberal MP
- Henry de Worms (1880–1895) – Conservative MP
- Harry Levy-Lawson (1885–1892, 1893–1895, 1905–1906, 1910–1916) – Liberal and later Liberal Unionist MP
- Lionel Louis Cohen (1885–1887) – Conservative MP
- Lewis Henry Isaacs (1885–1892) – Conservative MP
- James Alfred Jacoby (1885–1909) – Liberal MP
- Samuel Montagu (1885–1900) – Liberal MP
- Ferdinand de Rothschild (1885–1898) – Liberal and later Liberal Unionist Party MP
- Herbert Jessel (1896–1906, 1910–1918) – Liberal Unionist and later Conservative MP
- Sydney Stern (1891–1895) – Liberal MP
- Herbert Leon (1891–1895) – Liberal MP
- Benjamin Cohen (1892–1906) – Conservative MP
- Coningsby Disraeli (1892–1906) – Conservative MP
- Henry Lopes (1892–1900) – Conservative MP
- Gustav Wilhelm Wolff (1892–1910) – Conservative MP
- Harry Marks (1895–1900, 1904–1910) – Conservative MP
- Harry Samuel (1895–1906, 1910–1922) – Conservative MP
- Arthur Strauss (1895–1900, 1910–1918) – Liberal Unionist Party and later Conservative MP
- Sigismund Mendl (1898–1900) – Liberal MP
- Walter Rothschild (1899–1910) – Liberal Unionist and later Conservative MP
- Edward Sassoon (1899–1912) – Liberal Unionist MP

=== 1900–1939 ===
- Eric Hambro (1900–1907) Conservative MP
- Francis Lucas (1900–1906) Conservative MP
- Stuart Samuel (1900–1916) Liberal MP
- Herbert Samuel (1902–1918 & 1929–1935) Liberal MP and Leader of the Liberal Party
- Rufus Isaacs (1904–1913) Liberal MP
- Charles Henry (1906–1919) Liberal MP
- Arthur Lever (1906–1910 & 1922–1923) Liberal MP
- Maurice Levy (1906–1918) Liberal MP
- Philip Magnus (1906–1922) Conservative MP
- Alfred Mond (1906–1928) Liberal and then Conservative MP
- Edwin Samuel Montagu (1906–1922) Liberal MP
- Horatio Myer (1906–1910) Liberal MP
- Harry Primrose (1906–1910) Liberal MP
- Herbert Raphael (1906–1918) Liberal MP
- Bertram Straus (1906–1910) Liberal MP
- Edward Strauss (1906–1910, 1910–1923, 1927–1929 & 1931–1939) Liberal and then Liberal National MP
- Felix Cassel (1910–1916) Conservative MP
- Sydney Goldman (1910–1918) Conservative MP
- Frank Goldsmith (1910–1918) Conservative MP
- Trebitsch Lincoln (1910) Liberal MP
- Neil Primrose (1910–1917) Liberal MP
- Lionel Nathan de Rothschild (1910–1923) Conservative MP
- Maurice de Forest (1911–1918) – Liberal MP
- Leo Amery (1911–1945) Conservative MP
- Samuel Samuel (1913–1934) Conservative MP
- Sir Percy Harris, 1st Baronet (1916–1918 & 1922–1945) Liberal MP
- Brunel Cohen (1918-1931), Conservative MP
- Gerald Hurst (1918–1923 & 1924–1935) Conservative MP
- Edward Manville (1918–1923) Conservative MP
- Arthur Samuel (1918–1937) Conservative MP
- Walter de Frece (1920–1931) Conservative MP
- Robert Gee (1921–1922 & 1924–1927) – Conservative MP
- Maurice Alexander (1922–1923) Liberal MP
- Alfred Butt (1922–1936), Conservative MP
- Manny Shinwell (1922–1924, 1928–1931 & 1935–1970) Labour MP
- Leonard Benjamin Franklin (1923–1924) Liberal MP
- Ernest Spero (1923–1924 & 1929–1930) Liberal and then Labour MP
- Leslie Haden-Guest (1923–1927 & 1937–1950) Labour MP
- Leslie Hore-Belisha (1923–1945), Liberal and then Liberal National MP
- Henry Mond (1923–1924 & 1929–1931) Liberal and then Conservative MP
- Joseph Sunlight (1923–1924) Liberal MP
- Moss Turner-Samuels (1923–1924 & 1945–1957) Labour MP
- Harry Day (1924–1931 & 1935–1939) Labour MP
- Samuel Finburgh (1924-1929) Conservative MP
- Frank Meyer (1924–1929) Conservative MP
- Isidore Salmon (1924–1941) Conservative MP
- Henry Slesser (1924–1929) Labour MP
- Michael Marcus (1929–1931) Labour MP
- Harry Louis Nathan (1929–1935 & 1937–1940), Liberal and then Labour MP
- Marion Phillips (1929–1931) Labour MP
- James de Rothschild (1929–1945) Liberal MP
- George Strauss (1929–1931 & 1934–1979) Labour MP
- Alfred Beit (1931–1945) Conservative MP
- Alfred Chotzner (1931–1934) Conservative MP
- Louis Gluckstein (1931–1945) Conservative MP
- Barnett Janner (1931–1935 & 1945–1970) Liberal and then Labour MP
- Dudley Joel (1931–1941) Conservative MP
- Thomas Levy (1931–1945) Conservative MP
- Abraham Lyons (1931–1945) Conservative MP
- Marcus Samuel (1934–1942) Conservative MP
- Henry Strauss (1935–1945 & 1946–1955) Conservative MP
- Sydney Silverman (1935–1968) Labour MP
- Daniel Frankel (1935–1945) Labour MP
- Lewis Silkin (1936–1950) Labour MP
- Daniel Lipson (1937–1950) Independent Conservative MP

=== 1940–1973 ===
- John Mack (1942–1951) Labour MP
- Herschel Lewis Austin (1945–1950) Labour MP
- Louis Comyns (1945–1950) Labour MP
- John Diamond (1945–1951 & 1957–1970) Labour MP
- Maurice Edelman (1945–1976) Labour MP
- Mont Follick, (1945–1955) Labour MP
- Harold Lever (1945–1979) Labour MP
- George Jeger (1945–1971) Labour MP
- Santo Jeger (1945–1953) Labour MP
- Benn Levy (1945–1950) Labour MP
- Marcus Lipton (1945–1978) Labour MP
- Ian Mikardo (1945–1959 & 1964–1987) Labour MP
- Maurice Orbach (1945–1959 & 1964–1979) Labour MP
- Phil Piratin (1945–1950) Communist Party of Great Britain MP
- Samuel Segal (1945–1950) Labour MP
- Julius Silverman (1945–1983) Labour MP
- Barnett Stross (1945–1966) Labour MP
- David Weitzman (1945–1979) Labour MP
- Austen Albu, (1948–1974) Labour MP
- Julian Amery (1950–1992) Conservative MP
- Leslie Lever (1950–1970) Labour MP
- Gerald Nabarro (1950–1973) Conservative MP
- Frank Allaun (1955–1983) Labour MP
- Henry d'Avigdor-Goldsmid (1955–1974) Conservative MP
- Keith Joseph (1956–1987) Conservative MP
- Philip Goodhart (1957–1992) Conservative MP
- Leo Abse (1958–1987) Labour MP
- Michael Cliffe (1958–1964) Labour MP
- Myer Galpern (1959–1979) Labour MP
- David Ginsburg (1959–1983) Labour and later Social Democratic Party MP
- John Mendelson (1959–1978) Labour MP
- John Silkin (1963–1987) Labour MP
- Joel Barnett (1964–1983), Labour MP
- Edmund Dell (1964–1979) Labour MP
- Jack Dunnett (1964–1983), Labour MP
- Reginald Freeson (1964–1987), Labour MP
- David Kerr (1964–1970) Labour MP
- Robert Maxwell (1964–1970) Labour MP
- Henry Solomons (1964–1965) Labour MP
- Maurice Miller (1964–1987) Labour MP
- Paul Rose (1964–79) Labour MP
- Samuel Silkin (1964–1983) Labour MP
- Robert Sheldon (1964–2001), Labour MP
- Renée Short (1964–1987) Labour MP
- Raphael Tuck (1964–1979) Labour MP
- Stanley Henig (1966-1970) Labour MP
- Edward Lyons (1966–1983) Labour and later Social Democratic Party MP
- Eric Moonman (1966–1970 & 1974–1979) Labour MP
- Robert Adley (1970–1993) Conservative MP
- Jack d'Avigdor-Goldsmid (1970–1974) Conservative MP
- Sally Oppenheim-Barnes (1970–1987) Conservative MP
- Stanley Clinton-Davis (1970–1983) Labour MP
- Michael Fidler (1970–1974) Conservative MP
- Geoffrey Finsberg (1970–1992) Conservative MP
- Greville Janner (1970–1997) Labour MP
- Toby Jessel (1970–1997) Conservative MP
- Gerald Kaufman (1970–2017), Labour MP
- Anthony Meyer (1970–1997), Conservative MP
- Harold Soref (1970–1974) Conservative MP
- Christopher Tugendhat (1970–1977) Conservative MP
- Neville Sandelson (1971–1983) Labour and later Social Democratic Party MP
- Clement Freud (1973–1987) Liberal MP
- Tim Sainsbury (1973–1997) Conservative MP

=== 1974–2000 ===
- Leon Brittan (1974–1988), Conservative MP
- Ivan Lawrence (1974–1997), Conservative MP
- Nigel Lawson (1974–1992), Conservative MP
- Millie Miller (1974–1977), Labour MP
- Malcolm Rifkind (1974–1997 & 2005–2015), Conservative MP
- Anthony Steen (1974–2010), Conservative MP
- Alf Dubs (1979–1987), Labour MP
- Sheila Faith (1979–1983), Conservative MP
- David Winnick (1979–2017), Labour MP
- Mark Wolfson (1979–1997), Conservative MP
- Martin Brandon-Bravo (1983–1992), Conservative MP
- Alex Carlile (1983–1997), Liberal and later Liberal Democrat MP
- Harry Cohen (1983–2010), Labour MP
- Edwina Currie (1983–1997), Conservative MP
- Michael Howard (1983–2010), Conservative MP and Leader of the Conservative Party
- Phillip Oppenheim (1983–1997), Conservative MP
- David Sumberg (1983–1997), Conservative MP
- Mildred Gordon (1987-1997) Labour MP
- Irvine Patnick (1987–1997), Conservative MP
- Gerry Steinberg (1987–2005), Labour MP
- Michael Fabricant (1992–2024), Conservative MP
- Peter Mandelson (1992–2004), Labour MP
- Barbara Roche (1992–2005), Labour MP
- Margaret Hodge (1994–2024), Labour MP
- John Bercow (1997–2019), Conservative MP and Speaker of the House of Commons
- Peter Bradley (1997–2005), Labour MP
- Ivor Caplin (1997–2005), Labour MP
- Louise Ellman (1997–2019), Labour and later Independent MP
- Fabian Hamilton (1997–present), Labour MP
- Evan Harris (1997–2010), Liberal Democrat MP
- Oona King (1997–2005), Labour MP
- Oliver Letwin (1997–2019), Conservative MP
- Julian Lewis (1997–present), Conservative MP
- Ivan Lewis (1997–2019), Labour MP and later independent MP
- Gillian Merron (1997–2010), Labour MP

=== 2000–present ===
- Jonathan Djanogly (2001–2024), Conservative MP
- Hamish Falconer, Labour
- Paul Goodman (2001–2010) Conservative MP
- George Osborne (2001–2017), Conservative MP
- David Miliband (2001–2013), Labour MP
- Ed Miliband (2005–present), Labour MP and former Leader of the Labour Party
- Susan Kramer (2005–2010), Liberal Democrat MP
- Lynne Featherstone (2005–2015), Liberal Democrat MP
- Brooks Newmark (2005–2015), Conservative MP
- Grant Shapps (2005–2024), Conservative MP
- Lee Scott (2005–2015), Conservative MP
- Ed Vaizey (2005–2019), Conservative MP
- Luciana Berger (2010–2019), Labour Co-operative MP and later Liberal Democrat MP
- Michael Ellis (2010–2024), Conservative MP
- Zac Goldsmith (2010–2016 & 2017–2019), Conservative MP
- Robert Halfon (2010–2024), Conservative MP
- Richard Harrington (2010–2019), Conservative MP
- Julian Huppert (2010–2015), Liberal Democrat MP
- Andrew Percy (2010–2024), Conservative MP
- Lucy Frazer (2015–2024), Conservative MP
- Ruth Smeeth (2015–2019), Labour MP
- Tom Tugendhat (2015–present), Conservative MP
- Alex Sobel (2017–present), Labour MP
- Ian Levy (2019–2024), Conservative MP
- Charlotte Nichols (2019–present), Labour MP
- Damien Egan (2024–present), Labour MP
- Ben Coleman (2024–present), Labour MP
- David Pinto-Duschinsky (2024–present), Labour MP
- Georgia Gould (2024–present), Labour MP
- Katie Lam (2024–present), Conservative MP
- Matthew Patrick (2024–present), Labour MP
- Peter Prinsley (2024–present), Labour MP
- Sarah Sackman (2024–present), Labour MP
- Josh Simons (2024–2026), Labour MP

== Jewish peers ==
There have also been many Jewish members of the House of Lords, some of whom are listed below.

- David Alliance, Baron Alliance Liberal Democrats
- Irwin Bellow, Baron Bellwin Conservative
- Jeremy Beecham, Baron Beecham Labour
- Max Beloff, Baron Beloff Conservative
- Alexander Bernstein, Baron Bernstein of Craigweil Labour
- Sidney Bernstein, Baron Bernstein Labour
- Alma Birk, Baroness Birk, Labour
- John Browne, Baron Browne of Madingley Crossbench
- Ruth Deech, Baroness Deech Crossbench
- Bernard Delfont, Baron Delfont Labour
- Joseph Duveen, 1st Baron Duveen Crossbench
- Charlie Falconer, Baron Falconer of Thoroton, Labour
- Andrew Feldman, Baron Feldman of Elstree, Conservative
- Basil Feldman, Baron Feldman Conservative,
- Lynne Featherstone, Baroness Featherstone Liberal Democrats
- Daniel Finkelstein, Baron Finkelstein Conservative
- Samuel Fisher, Baron Fisher of Camden Labour
- David Freud, Baron Freud, Conservative
- Henry Cohen, 1st Baron Cohen of Birkenhead Crossbench
- Dora Gaitskell, Baroness Gaitskell Labour
- Anna Gaitskell, Baroness Gaitskell, Labour
- Robert Gavron, Baron Gavron, Labour
- Maurice Glasman, Baron Glasman Labour
- David Gold, Baron Gold Conservative
- Peter Goldsmith, Baron Goldsmith, Labour
- Arnold Goodman, Baron Goodman, Labour
- Anthony Grabiner, Baron Grabiner Labour
- Desmond Hirshfield, Baron Hirshfield Labour
- Gerald Isaacs, 2nd Marquess of Reading Conservative
- Sydney Jacobson, Baron Jacobson, Crossbench
- Immanuel Jakobovits, Baron Jakobovits Crossbench
- Peter Levene, Baron Levene of Portsoken Crossbench
- Michael Levy, Baron Levy Labour
- Edward Levy-Lawson, 1st Baron Burnham, Crossbench
- Richard Kahn, Baron Kahn, Crossbench
- Jonathan Kestenbaum, Baron Kestenbaum, Labour
- Stormont Mancroft, 2nd Baron Mancroft, Conservative
- Benjamin Mancroft, 3rd Baron Mancroft, Conservative
- Peter Mandelson, Baron Mandelson, Labour
- Peter Mond, 4th Baron Melchett, Labour
- Victor Mishcon, Baron Mishcon, Labour
- Roger Nathan, 2nd Baron Nathan, Crossbench
- Julia Neuberger, Baroness Neuberger, Crossbench
- David Neuberger, Baron Neuberger of Abbotsbury, Crossbench
- David Pannick, Baron Pannick Crossbench
- Maurice Peston, Baron Peston of Mile End, Labour
- Beatrice Plummer, Baroness Plummer, Labour
- Stuart Polak, Baron Polak Conservative
- Gail Rebuck, Baroness Rebuck Labour
- Victor Rothschild, 3rd Baron Rothschild Labour
- Jonathan Sacks, Baron Sacks, Crossbench
- Alan Sainsbury, Baron Sainsbury, SDP
- David Sainsbury, Baron Sainsbury of Turville Labour
- John Sainsbury, Baron Sainsbury of Preston Candover Conservative
- Marcus Samuel, 1st Viscount Bearsted Conservative
- Walter Samuel, 2nd Viscount Bearsted Conservative
- Beatrice Serota, Baroness Serota, Labour
- Herbert Stern, 1st Baron Michelham Conservative
- Leonard Steinberg, Baron Steinberg Conservative
- Alan Sugar, Baron Sugar, Crossbench
- David Triesman, Baron Triesman Labour
- Leslie Turnberg, Baron Turnberg, Labour
- George Weidenfeld, Baron Weidenfeld SDP
- Leonard Wolfson, Baron Wolfson Conservative
- Harry Woolf, Baron Woolf, Crossbench
- David Young, Baron Young of Graffham, Conservative

== Jewish founders of political parties and organisations ==
- Luciana Berger – co-founder of Change UK
- Tony Cliff – founder of Socialist Workers Party
- James Goldsmith – founder of Referendum Party (Jewish father)
- Ted Grant – founder of Militant tendency
- Jon Lansman – founder of Momentum

== Jewish politicians with careers abroad ==
- Abraham Beame, a mayor of New York City, was born in London
- Chaim Herzog, an Israeli President, was born in Belfast
- Jerry Springer, a mayor of Cincinnati, was born in London
- Julius Vogel, the first Jewish Prime Minister of New Zealand, was born in London.

== See also ==
- History of the Jews in England
- History of the Jews in Ireland
- History of the Jews in Scotland
- History of the Jews in Wales
- List of British Jews
- List of Britons
- List of Jewish Fellows of the Royal Society
- List of Scottish Jews – political figures
- Lists of Jews

== Bibliography ==
- JYB = Jewish Year Book (annual)
