= Gerald Stillit =

British-born inventor, publisher and polyglot

- Born: Gerald Stillitz; 1938 (age 87–88); London, England
- Education: London School of Economics
- Occupation: Publisher
- Years active: 1963-2003
- Known for: Stillitron

Gerald Barry Stillit FCA (born 1938) is a British-born inventor, publisher and polyglot, who founded and was chairman of Stillit Books Ltd of Bond Street, his former educational publishing company. In 1963, Stillit invented an electronic corrector (Stillitron Teaching Aid) which was first applied as a teaching tool in conjunction with mathematics, science and language textbooks, used extensively throughout the British schooling system in the 1960s. This device was the first of its kind to combine circuit-board electronics with the ability to provide students with immediate positive feedback in monitoring answers to multiple choice questions. Subsequently, the electronic corrector was developed alongside a series of language courses which sold millions of copies worldwide throughout the 1970s and 1980s.

== Early life and education ==
Stillit was born in London, the youngest of four children to Joseph Stillitz, subsequently anglicising his name by deed poll. Stillit was educated at Highgate School in North London, leaving at 16 after having obtained O-Levels to train as a Chartered Accountant. He thereupon attended the London School of Economics, reading towards a Bachelor's in Economics under logicians Karl Popper and Imre Lakatos – however left aged 25 before completion of his degree as the success of his inventions overtook him. Concurrently, he also worked in his father's company Gor-Ray, at the time Britain's foremost skirt manufacturer, and while there introduced innovative retailing concepts such as Britain's first boutique concession store, operating within House of Fraser. Travelling throughout Western Europe as a young man retailing and distributing for Gor-Ray, Stillit quickly achieved multilingualism; this asset eventually evolved into the development of his own Stillitron language courses. Stillit later married the Company Secretary of Stillitron in 1986, with whom he has one son.

== Career ==
=== Electronic Corrector ===
Stillit's response-analyser was a world-patented two-part device consisting of a nickel-plated printed logic-circuit powered by an AA battery, and a special responding book. This 'electric textbook' was placed above the teaching aid and the responder marked the answers by penetrating the page with a stylus (signalling probe) which contacted the backing member to complete an electrical circuit indicating the correctness of the answer selected; a light immediately showed the result – green for right, and red for the wrong answer. The backing member underlying the textbook page had an electronically conductive pattern which permitted wide latitude in the format of the page or sheet containing the questions without allowing the student to guess which answers were correct by virtue of their position on the page. It was the first corrector of its kind to combine questions on the overlaying paper with immediate responses and feedback, obviating the requirement for referral to corresponding separate reference sheets, and the construction of the circuit board was such that it permitted the format of the multiple question sheet to be randomised within large limits so as to avoid visual the repetition and monotony associated with previous correctors, not only from page to page or sheet to sheet, but within any individual sheet itself, thus allowing for a plurality of possible answers. Its simplicity permitted even young children to use the Stillitron Teaching Aid to teach themselves through independent self-learning; at the time, it was one of the simplest yet among the cheapest devices devised in Britain.

=== Stillit Books Ltd ===
In this fashion, multiple choice question sheets could be made visually enticing as added inducement for retention of the student's interest. The corrector also made it a simple matter to provide self-educational books which for the first time could actually have the appearance of books, and not impart the appearance of a rigidised and limited question and answer format; simultaneously, this possibility also led to the presentation of subject matter in a visual form which could be tailored to the educational level of any student. At the time, the field of education was burgeoning due in large part to research efforts to determine factors most effective at evoking responses from students; one of the most vital elements was determined as retaining interest and attention. The Teaching Aid was the first device practically devised to promote the capture and retention of student's interest and enthusiasm through continued and varied participation which stimulated interest and importantly retained it over protracted periods of times, extracting a maximal amount of knowledge per unit of time.

Printed on durable, lightweight, rigid plastic requiring no maintenance and with the initial cost of equipping a classroom very low, the innovative corrector was particularly suited to the classroom environment, and with no writing – just applying the stylus to the corrector and receiving immediate visual indication of success or failure – the Stillitron System was immediately attractive to children. Throughout the 1960s Stillit published his multiple choice programmed learning books covering a wide range of subjects in biology, chemistry, mathematics, physics and elementary language exercises from school to university level, which were taken up throughout the British schooling system.

As a linguist, in order to fully realise employment of the corrector, Stillit applied the Stillitron System to foreign languages and published multi-volume language learning courses containing thousands of humorous, attention capturing illustrations throughout the 1970s and 1980s in Arabic, English (as a foreign language), French, German, Italian and Spanish which sold millions of copies worldwide, distributing initially through encyclopædia publishers Grolier International before marketing and distributing through his own successful publishing house Stillit Books Ltd, operating from within Gor-Ray's Bond Street head offices. Each course additionally comprised multi-volume audio-learning cassettes (eventually updated to Secure Digital) and dictionaries and lexica to aid learning and pronunciation; in addition, Stillit developed an English Synopticon, a novel methodology of consolidating grammatical analysis.

Furthermore, Stillit invented the 'vocalizer', a playback device which allowed the user to record their voice onto cassette tape (for subsequent playback), while for the first time simultaneously permitting the user to aurally receive their speech relayed through headphones as if heard by another converser, whilst the same cassette tape played repetitions of phrases, thus permitting active comparisons of oral pronunciation to the original sounds, technology later adopted in language laboratory headsets. Concurrently, Stillit also produced and installed Stillitron Language Laboratories classrooms in collaboration with the British Council in schools, educational institutions and leading multi-national corporations' training centres right throughout the world.

== See also ==
- Educational Technology
- Educational Psychology
