= Jacob Reinowitz =

British rabbi

Personal life
- Born: 1818 Wilkowisk, Congress Poland
- Died: 17 May 1893 (aged 74–75) London, England
- Buried: West Ham Jewish Cemetery
- Spouse: Esther Liba Binion

Religious life
- Religion: Judaism
- Position: Dayan
- Organisation: London Beth Din

Jacob Reinowitz (1818 – 17 May 1893), also known as Reb Yankele, was a British rabbi and dayan.

== Biography ==
Jacob Reinowitz was born in 1818 in Wilkowisk, Poland (now Vilkaviškis, Lithuania), descended from a long line of rabbis and scholars.

He assumed the role of rabbi in his hometown at the age of twenty-eight and served in this capacity for thirty years. In 1876, he relocated to London, where he accepted the position of preacher at the Talmud Torah in Whitechapel. His erudition and dedication in the East End of London attracted the attention of Chief Rabbi Nathan Marcus Adler, leading to his appointment as a member of the London Beth Din.

Among Reinowitz's students were Simeon Singer, Hermann Adler, and Moses Hyamson.

== In popular culture ==
Reinowitz is believed to have been the inspiration for the character "Reb Shemuel" in Israel Zangwill's work, Children of the Ghetto.
