= Joseph Hertz =

Chief Rabbi of the UK (1913–1946)

Rabbi Joseph Hertz CH
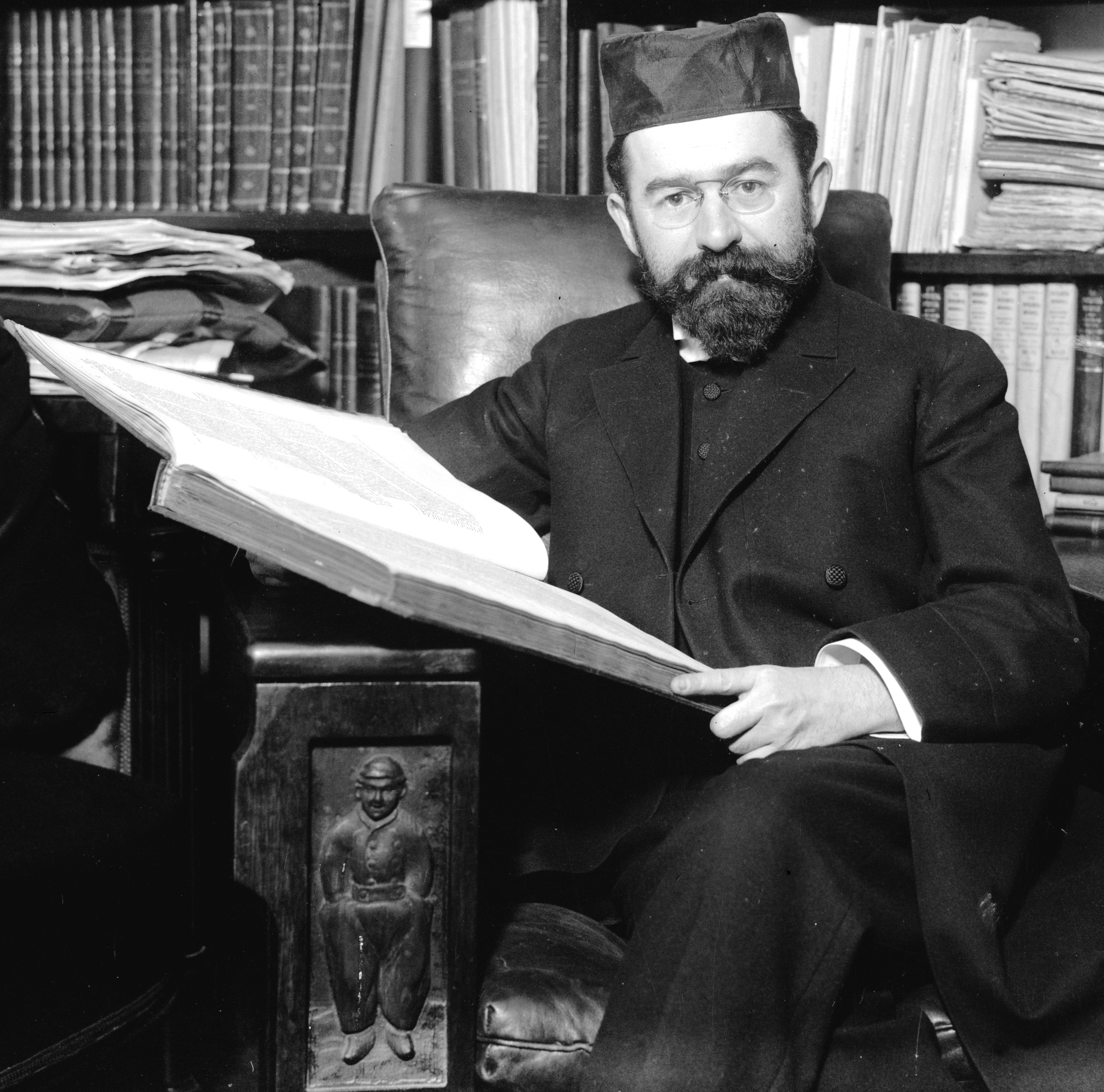
- Joseph Hertz in 1913

Chief Rabbi of Great Britain and the Commonwealth
- In office 1913–1946
- Preceded by: Hermann Adler
- Succeeded by: Israel Brodie

Personal details
- Born: 25 September 1872 Rebrín/Rebrény, Kingdom of Hungary (now Zemplínska Široká, Slovakia)
- Died: 14 January 1946 (aged 73)
- Resting place: Willesden Jewish Cemetery

Joseph Herman Hertz CH (25 September 1872 – 14 January 1946) was a British Rabbi and biblical scholar. He held the position of Chief Rabbi of the United Kingdom from 1913 until his death in 1946, in a period encompassing both world wars and the Holocaust.

== Early life ==
Hertz was born in Rebrín/Rebrény, Kingdom of Hungary (presently part of the village of Zemplínska Široká, Slovak Republic), in 1872 and immigrated to New York City in 1884. He was educated at New York City College (BA), Columbia University (PhD) and the Jewish Theological Seminary of America (Rabbi, 1894, the Seminary's first graduate). His first ministerial post was in Syracuse, New York at what is now Temple Adath Yeshurun.

== South Africa ==
In 1898, he moved to Transvaal, South Africa, to the Witwatersrand Old Hebrew Congregation in Johannesburg. He stayed there until 1911, despite attempts by President Paul Kruger in 1899 to expel him for his pro-British sympathies and for advocating the removal of religious disabilities of Jews and Catholics in South Africa. He was Professor of Philosophy at Transvaal University College (later known as the University of the Witwatersrand), 1906–8.

In 1911, he returned to New York to the Orach Chayim Congregation.

== Chief Rabbi ==
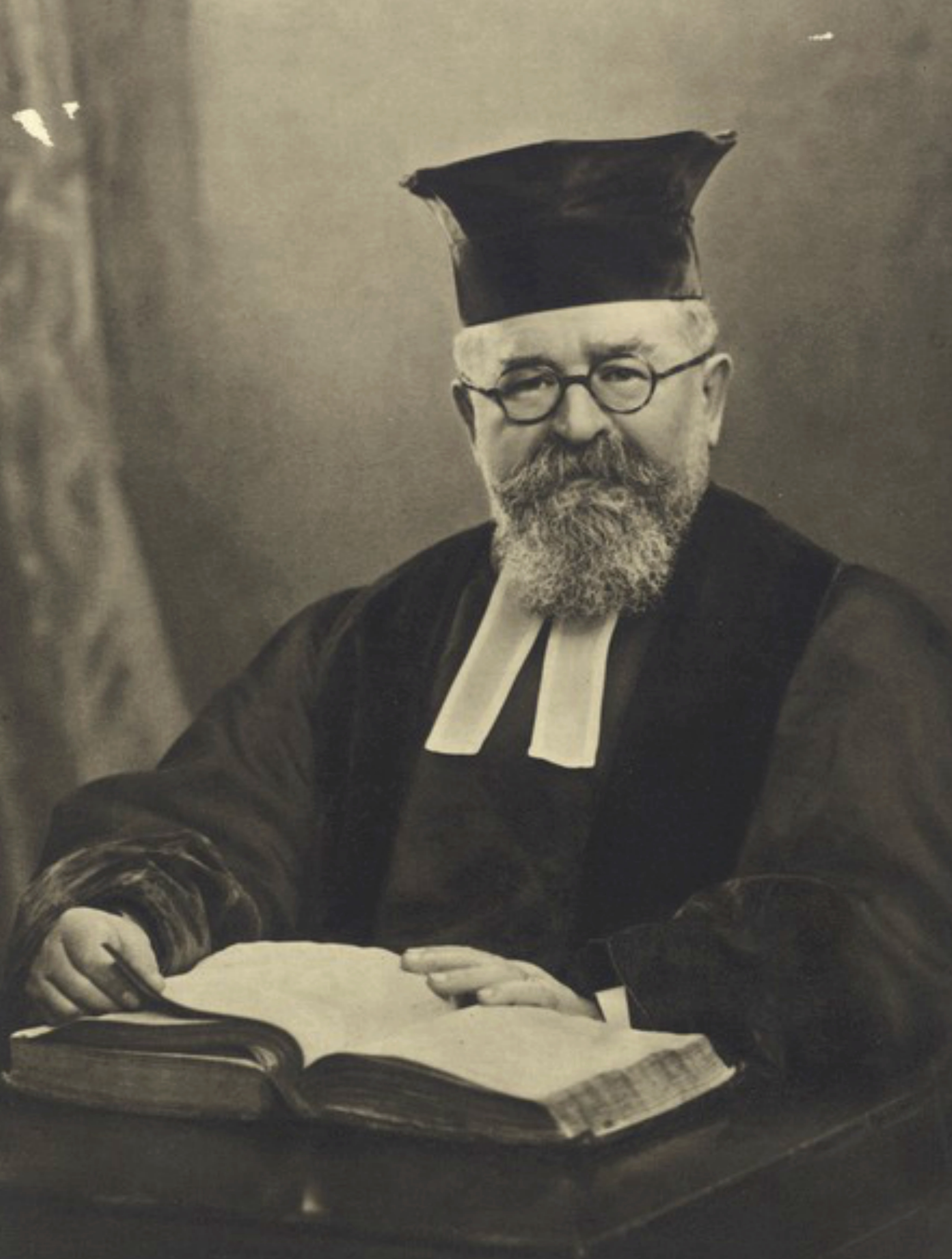
Rabbi Hertz in the late 1920s

In 1913, Hertz was elected Chief Rabbi of the United Hebrew Congregations of the British Empire; he received 298 votes against 39 for Dayan Moses Hyamson. His rival candidates had also included Bernard Drachman.

Hertz held the post until his death. His tenure was affected by arguments with a wide variety of people, mainly within the Jewish community; the Dictionary of National Biography describes him as a "combative Conservative". It was said that he was in favour of resolving disagreements by calm discussion – when all other methods had failed.

Despite his title, he was not universally recognised as the final rabbinical authority, even in Britain. While he was Chief Rabbi of the group of synagogues known as the United Hebrew Congregations of the British Empire, led by the United Synagogue, a minority of new immigrants who had arrived since the 1880s regarded it as insufficiently orthodox. Hertz tried both persuasion and such force as he could muster to influence them; he added to his credibility among these immigrants by persuading Rabbi Yehezkel Abramsky to become head of the London Beth Din.

Hertz antagonised others by his strong support for Zionism in the 1920s and 1930s, when many Jews were against it, fearing that it would lead to accusations against the Jewish community of divided loyalty. Hertz was strongly opposed to Reform and Liberal Judaism, though he did not allow this to create personal animosities, and had no objection in principle to attending the funerals of Reform Jews.

However, despite all this, his eloquent oratory, lucid writing, erudition and sincerity earned him the respect of the majority of British Jews and many outside the Jewish community. His commentary on the Torah is still to be found in most Orthodox synagogues and Jewish homes in Great Britain. Despite there being some Ultra-Orthodox Jews who do not look up to Hertz, prominent Ultra-Orthodox Rabbi Nosson Scherman maintained that Hertz "was a great man," a courageous Rabbi, and that although he was affiliated with the Jewish Theological Seminary Hertz "was Orthodox, without any question."

Although Hertz vigorously denounced the horror of the Holocaust (at one point relating an eyewitness claim that "German soldiers in football attire entered [a] stadium [near Kiev]. They snatched the infants from their mothers' arms and used them as footballs, bouncing and kicking them around the arena."), Hertz was opposed to the Kindertransport if it meant Jewish refugee children would be raised in the homes of gentiles. Hertz saw the British war effort in the noblest of terms, wishing Prime Minister Winston Churchill a happy 70th birthday in late 1944 with the message, "But for your wisdom and courage there would have been a Vichy England lying prostrate before an all-powerful Satanism that spelled slavery to the western peoples, death to Israel, and night to the sacred heritage of man."

He was ex officio President of Jews' College, and Acting Principal, 1939–45. He was President of the Jewish Historical Society of England, 1922–3 and after his tenure was over, he continued to preside over lectures at the society including a lecture by then Chief Rabbi of Cologne, Germany, Rabbi Dr. Adolf Kober in 1937. He was also President of the Conference of Anglo-Jewish Preachers. He was on the Board of Governors of the Hebrew University of Jerusalem and Chairman of the Governing Body of its Institute of Jewish Studies. He was Vice-President of a wide variety of Jewish and non-Jewish bodies, including the Anglo-Jewish Association, the London Hospital, the League of Nations Union, the National Council of Public Morals and King George's Fund for Sailors. In 1942, with the Archbishop of Canterbury, William Temple, Hertz founded the Council of Christians and Jews to combat anti-Jewish bigotry.

His daughter Judith married Rabbi Solomon Schonfeld. His great granddaughter is the economist Noreena Hertz.

=== Imperial tour ===
From 1920 to 1921, Hertz became the first chief rabbi to undertake a pastoral tour of the British Empire. He arrived at the idea of such a tour after reading reports of the Prince of Wales' successful tour of Canada following the First World War and decided to do something similar to visit small Jewish communities in the British Dominions (later known as the British Commonwealth). Hertz "Imperial tour" took him 40,000 miles and to 42 Jewish communities over 11 months in South Africa, Rhodesia, Australia, New Zealand, Fiji and Canada. He lectured extensively on the Bible to Jews and non-Jews and sought to raise £1 million for Jewish education.

He began his tour in South Africa, which had a Jewish population of 66,000, on 27 October 1920 and travelled throughout the country over a period of three months, covering 5,000 miles by railway, including stops in several smaller communities as well as the Cape Town, Johannesburg and Pretoria, where he was greeted by Prime Minister Jan Smuts, followed by a trip to Bulawayo in neighbouring Rhodesia. He then proceeded to Australia, with 20,000 Jews, where he delivered lectures in 20 communities. His travels then took him to New Zealand, with 2,500 Jews, stopped in Fiji where a few Jewish families were living, before arriving in Canada, with 125,000 Jews, on July 4, 1921 for a six-week tour that took him across Western Canada with stops in Vancouver, Calgary, Edmonton, Saskatoon, Regina and Winnipeg delivering eleven sermons and speaking at thirteen meetings as well as receptions with four Lieutenant-Governors, received by seven Mayors and visiting three provincial Premiers. He carried out many engagements in the large Jewish centres of Toronto and in what was then Canada's largest Jewish community of 40,000 in Montreal, highlighted by an address to 2,000 children in a park. He continued to Halifax, Nova Scotia before concluding with a Bible lecture in St. John, New Brunswick, departing Canada on August 16, 1921.

After returning to England, he wrote “I had preached love and loyalty to the Empire wherever I went, and sown the seeds of Jewish idealism and spirituality in all the far-off places I had visited.” He was granted a private audience with King George V at Buckingham Palace in November to discuss his visit.

== Calendar reform ==
In the 1920s, Hertz successfully organised international opposition to a proposed calendar reform. The League of Nations was considering a calendar amendment, The World Calendar, such that a given date would fall on the same day of the week every year. This requires that one day every year (two in leap years) is not any day of the week but a "world day". Thus, once or twice a year there would be eight days rather than seven between consecutive Saturdays. Thus the Jewish Sabbath, which must occur every seventh day, would be on a different weekday each year. The same applies to the Christian Sabbath. Hertz realised that this would cause problems for Jews and Christians alike in observing their Sabbaths, and mobilised worldwide religious opposition to defeat the proposal.

== Honours ==
He was made a Member of the Order of the Companions of Honour in 1943. He was also Commander of the Order of Léopold II of Belgium, and held a Columbia University medal.

A memorial plaque on his former London home at 103 Hamilton Terrace in Maida Vale was unveiled on 12 March 1996.

== Publications ==
- Affirmations of Judaism, a collection of his sermons, was well regarded. He published a further three volumes of Sermons, Addresses, and Studies.
- A Book of Jewish Thoughts (1917), a selection of Jewish wisdom through the millennia, was immensely popular and ran to 25 editions.
- The Battle for the Sabbath at Geneva, an account of his work opposing calendar reform.

Hertz edited a Hebrew-English edition of the Jewish Prayer Book or Siddur (1946), and contributed to the Jewish Encyclopedia and the Encyclopædia Britannica.

=== Hertz Chumash ===
Hertz edited a significant commentary on the Torah (1929–36, one volume edition 1937). Published as The Pentateuch and Haftorahs and popularly known as the Hertz Chumash, this classic Hebrew-English edition of the Five Books of Moses, with corresponding Haftorahs, is used in many synagogues and classrooms throughout the English-speaking world. The work – through its commentary and essays – is noted for its stance against Higher Criticism.

It is also referred to as the Hertz Pentateuch, and it includes the following features:

- "extensive essays on ... perceived conflict between science and religion"
- comparisons of "Torah’s laws and those in the Code of Hammurabi"
- comments from and source references to Christian sources, including the Authorized Version (King James Version) and Revised Version

It also includes views of the most important medieval Jewish commentators, such as Abraham ibn Ezra, Rashi, Ramban, Radak, Sforno and Ralbag (Gersonides).

The actual writing, which produced five volumes, was done by four other people, but "Hertz recast their material into his own style."

When the five volumes were combined into a single volume (and published by Soncino Press), the Revised Version translation, but not the non-Jewish commentaries, were replaced with the 1917 Jewish Publication Society translation. Both translations were lightly edited by Hertz (e.g., at Lev. 27:29 RV and Num. 10:33 JPS).

== Notes and references ==
Jewish titles
Preceded by Hermann Adler	Chief Rabbi of Great Britain and the Commonwealth; 1913–1946	Succeeded by Israel Brodie
