= Leonard G. Montefiore =

Jewish philanthropist

- Born: Leonard Nathaniel Goldsmid-Montefiore; 2 June 1889; 12 Portman Square
- Died: 23 December 1961 (aged 72); The London Clinic
- Occupations: Jewish community leader and philanthropist

Leonard Nathaniel Goldsmid-Montefiore (2 June 1889 – 23 December 1961) was a wealthy member of the Montefiore family, the only son of Claude Montefiore, and he succeeded his father as a leader of Jewish philanthropic organisations in the UK including the Anglo-Jewish Association, the Central British Fund for German Jewry, and the Jewish Board of Guardians. He was a founder and president of the Wiener Library for the Study of the Holocaust and Genocide.

== Early life ==
He was the only son of Claude Montefiore—a prominent Jewish scholar and philanthropist—and was named after his uncle Leonard A. Montefiore. He was born at the family home of number 12, Portman Square on 2 June 1889. His mother, Therese Alice, died 8 days later, and so he was brought up by his grandmother, Emma Montefiore, who was from the wealthy Goldsmid family.

He was educated at Clifton College and Balliol College, Oxford, where he read history. While a student, he spent time in Berlin and Hanover, where he became fluent in German. After graduation, he worked and lived at Toynbee Hall—a settlement house in which rich people lived alongside the poor to do social work and alleviate poverty.

In 1913, he received a commission in the territorial 9th (Cyclist) Battalion of the Hampshire Regiment. During the First World War, he served in India and Siberia, rising to the rank of captain. In 1918, he was admitted to the Order of the British Empire, and in 1921 he joined the Athenaeum Club, being introduced by Viscount Milner.

In 1924, he married the sister of a close friend from college, Muriel Jeanetta Tuck (1892–1988), the youngest daughter of Adolph Tuck (whose wealthy family ran Raphael Tuck & Sons). They had two sons, David and Alan, who became a physician and Oxford don respectively. In 1924, he also campaigned in Soho for the election of Winston Churchill as an Independent, in the Westminster Abbey by-election.

== Charitable service ==
Leonard Montefiore was active in numerous charitable, cultural, and philanthropic organisations. Chaim Bermant wrote, "He attended them all, gave money to them all, offered guidance to them all".

These organisation included:

- Anglo-Jewish Association – president, vice-president, chairman of the industrial committee
- Bernhard Baron Settlement
- Central British Fund for German Jewry
- Clifton College – governor
- Froebel Educational Institute – chairman 1939–1961
- Jewish Association for the Protection of Girls and Women
- Jewish Board of Guardians – chairman of the industrial committee
- Jewish Colonization Association
- Jewish Refugees Committee – chairman
- Jews’ Free School
- Jews’ Temporary Shelter
- League of British Jews
- Leo Baeck College – chairman
- Reform Synagogues Association – president
- West London Synagogue – reader, senior treasurer, vice-president and warden
- Wiener Library – founder and president

== Germany and the Second World War ==
When Adolf Hitler became Chancellor of Germany in 1933 and his National Socialist party seized power, it threatened the Jewish community in Germany. Montefiore was at that time co-chairman of the Joint Foreign Committee of the Anglo-Jewish Association and the Board of Deputies of British Jews; the other co-chairman was Neville Laski. This committee had a tradition of protecting and supporting overseas Jews and it then established the Central British Fund for German Jewry. Another founder member was Otto Schiff, who organised the Jewish Refugees Committee, which Montefiore chaired. The wealth supporting this fund enabled a promise to be made to the British government that Jewish refugees from Germany would not be a burden on public finances. They also lobbied British society to protest against German discrimination against Jews but were not successful initially. Others wanted to organise a boycott of German goods but the Board of Deputies saw this as too extreme. There was also concern about Zionist influence, which the Board opposed as subverting their status as British. Montefiore was himself opposed to Zionism until he visited Israel in 1955.

Montefiore's fluency in the German language enabled him to study the details of the oppression of the Jews in Germany. He publicised these, writing articles, letters and pamphlets including The Jews in Germany: Facts and Figures (1934) and Exiles from Germany (1937).

In 1944, he toured the Mediterranean theatre to meet Jewish servicemen for the Welfare Branch of the War Office.

== The Windermere children ==
Montefiore organised aid for hundreds of Jewish orphans after the Second World War, acting as their guardian and arranging for them to be flown to England in heavy bombers by the RAF. They had been liberated from Nazi concentration camps and so required care and rehabilitation for which he arranged a special camp on the Calgarth Estate in Troutbeck Bridge, near Windermere. Montefiore made regular visits and took a personal interest in their development. Nurse Eva Kahn-Minden recalled his manner,

Monty has been to pay one of his flying visits. Taxi arrives; coat thrown into some corner, he greets me, asks how things are; the boys meet him, shake hands, talk, jest; up the stairs two at a time into Nathan's to deliver "a few highbrow magazines" and to discuss the latest on science, politics and art; down to inspect garden, cowshed;
...
When he has left, everyone has the feeling that he has come just for him or her – a remarkable man! Intelligence, compassion and financial freedom—which is the strongest? Love, concern and a certain shyness coupled with some extrovert abilities—perhaps that would describe him even better.

This refugee rescue was dramatised as The Windermere Children and broadcast by the BBC in 2020 for the 75th anniversary of the liberation of Auschwitz. In this production, the part of Leonard Montefiore was played by Tim McInnerny.
