= Daniel Langton =

American historian

Daniel R. Langton
- Title: Professor of Jewish history

Academic background
- Education: University of Southampton

Academic work
- Discipline: Historian
- Sub-discipline: Jewish-Christian relations
- Institutions: University of Manchester
- Notable works: The Apostle Paul in the Jewish Imagination: A Study in Modern Jewish Christian Relations
- Website: research.manchester.ac.uk/en/persons/daniel.langton

Daniel R. Langton is British professor of Jewish history in the department of religions and theology at the University of Manchester, England.

== Education ==
Langton was home-schooled before studying history for his BA (hons) 1991-94 and PhD 1994-98 at the Parkes Centre for the Study of Jewish/Non-Jewish Relations at the University of Southampton.

== Career ==
Langton has taught at the University of Manchester, in the department of religions and theology, since 2001. He is codirector of the Centre for Jewish Studies and coeditor of the journal Melilah. He was an AHRC leadership fellow for 2016-17 with a project entitled the Doubting Jew and Leverhulme Major Research Fellow 2013-15 with a project entitled Darwin's Jews. He was a recipient of the University of Manchester Teaching Excellence Prize in 2006. He was president 2014-15 and secretary 2002-10 of the British Association for Jewish Studies, and secretary 2010-14 of the European Association for Jewish Studies.

== Selected works ==
=== Books ===
Darwin in the Jewish Imagination: Jews’ Engagement with Evolutionary Theory (Oxford University Press, 2025), a comprehensive overview of Jewish responses to Darwinian evolution.

Reform Judaism and Darwin: How Engaging with Evolutionary Theory Shaped American Jewish Religion (De Gruyter, 2019), a survey of leading nineteenth- and early twentieth-century American progressive Jewish thinkers.

The Apostle Paul in the Jewish Imagination: A Study in Modern Jewish Christian Relations (Cambridge University Press, 2010), a survey of Jewish views of Paul.

Claude Montefiore: His Life and Thought (2002), an intellectual biography of Claude Montefiore developed from his Ph.D. thesis.

=== Edited books ===
Atheism, Scepticism and Challenges to Monotheism (2015), which presents a variety of scholarship on atheism and scepticism in Jewish contexts.

Normative Judaism? Jews, Judaism and Jewish Identity (2012), co-edited with Philip Alexander, which reflects modern scholarly debate about the nature of Judaism.

Writing the Holocaust (2011), co-edited with Jean-Marc Dreyfus, which treats a range of topics including Holocaust Theology.

=== Educational works ===
Jews and Christians Perspectives on Mission (2011), with Reuven Silverman and Patrick Morrow, which is a contribution to Interfaith dialogue.

Children of Zion: Jewish and Christian Perspectives on the Holy Land (2008), which is a contribution to Interfaith dialogue.
