= Herman Finer =

Herman Finer (February 24, 1898 – March 4, 1969) was a Jewish Romanian-born British political scientist and Fabian socialist.

Finer was born in Hertsa, Romania, to Max Finer and Fanny Weiner. He taught for many years at the University of Chicago. He was the eldest brother of Samuel Finer and the uncle of Pogues instrumentalist and composer Jem Finer.

He died from a heart attack in Chicago.

== Literary works ==
- Foreign governments at work, 1921
- The case against proportional representation, 1924
- Theory and practice of modern government, 2 Vols., 1932
- Representative government and a parliament, 1933
- English local government, 1933 (2nd ed. 1945, 3rd 1946)
- Mussolini's Italy, 1935
- British civil service, 1937
- The Delimination of the Part played by and an Analysis of the Effects of the Sense of Responsibility in Social Life and in particular in the Economic Order. in: Le sens de la responsabilite dans la vie sociale. Other authors Hanna Meuter, Cologne & John Atkinson Hobson. Institut de sociologie Solvay, Parc Léopold. - Brussels (1938 or 1939), Series: Enquêtes Sociologiques, Vol. 2. Université libre de Bruxelles. -Finer: p. 151 - 250 (engl.), ib. in French p. 251 - 338
- Municipal trading, 1941
- International T.V.A., 1944
- Road to reaction. Boston: Little, Brown and Company. 1945 – via Internet Archive.
- Future of government, 1946
- America's destiny, 1947
- The Theory and Practice of Modern Government, 1961 (4th ed. of the abridged one-volume 1950 edition of the two-volume work of 1932 'thoroughly rewritten as to be a new work', Preface [vi]), Methuen & Co. Ltd. London.
- "Dulles over SUEZ", 1964, Quadrangle Books, Chicago
