= Linda Joy Stern =

English judge and prosecutor

- Born: Linda Joy Hart; 21 December 1941; London
- Died: 10 September 2006 (aged 64); London
- Occupations: Judge, prosecutor

Linda Joy Stern, née Hart (21 December 1941 – 10 September 2006) was an English judge and prosecutor, known for prosecuting rape and child abuse cases.

== Early life and education ==
Linda Joy Hart was born in London in 1941, the daughter of Lionel Hart and Lily Rachel Gold. Her family was Jewish. Her father worked as a scientist during World War II and died in a laboratory incident shortly before she was born. Her stepfather was Ally Saville. She was educated at St Paul's Girls' School in London.

== Career ==
Hart was called to the Bar at Gray's Inn in 1971. In 1972, she became the first woman member of the Red Lion Chambers. In 1987 Stern won permission to use a new genetic paternity test in court to prove a sexual assault case, a first in an English criminal court.

Stern was appointed a QC in 1991. Stern was known for prosecuting murder, rape, and child abuse cases; most notably, she was prosecutor in the Victoria Climbié murder trial. She was a recorder of the Crown Court from 1990 to 2001, and was a circuit judge from 2001 to 2006.

Stern was elected a Fellow of the Royal Society of Arts in 1993.

== Personal life ==
Linda Joy Hart married twice. She married her first husband, Michael Brian Rose, in 1961. They had two sons, Ian and Jeremy, before Rose died in 1976. She married her second husband, commodities broker Nigel Maurice Stern, in 1978. She died from cancer in 2006, aged 64 years, in London.
