= Joseph Stillitz =

Polish-born British businessman (1903–1966)

- Born: Joseph Sztyglic; 18 February 1903; Warsaw, Poland
- Died: 19 April 1966 (aged 63)
- Citizenship: British
- Occupation: Tailor
- Known for: Gor-Ray
- Relatives: Gerald Stillit (son)

Chaim Joseph Stillitz (born Sztyglic; 18 February 1903 – 19 April 1966) was a Polish-born British businessman, who founded and was chairman of the Gor-Ray skirts company.

A 1951 Gor-Ray advertisement

== Biography ==
Stillitz was born into a Polish-Jewish Sztyglic family (also known as Stiglitz and Shtiglitz), in Warsaw in 1903, who emigrated to East London in around 1908 to escape the Jewish pogroms during the Polish revolution. He pursued the family business of tailoring, anglicising his name in the 1920s to trade as C. Stillitz along with his brother Abraham Louis Stillitz in Hackney. In 1928 he married the sister of Sidney Rustin, founder of the Rustins paint brand, with whom he had four children, two boys and two girls. His youngest son is inventor and publisher Gerald Stillit and his youngest daughter is artist and sculptor Barbara Kulick, who was commissioned by Prince Charles to sculpt his portrait. Following the War he was naturalised as a British citizen, legally taking the name Stillitz and moving to Finchley, and later St John's Wood and then Mayfair. His elegant ladieswear business grew to be highly successful; Stillitz was a keen motorist and an avid golfer, and after the War purchased Hartsbourne Manor in Hertfordshire, transforming it into a country golf club and instigating the Gor-Ray Cup, later to be won by, among others, Malcolm Gregson and Maurice Bembridge.

== Gor-Ray ==
The Gor-Ray Company was established in the 1920s as a manufacturer of top-quality skirts and trousers, specialising in pleated, classically tailored skirts. Originally C. Stillitz & Co., the name was changed to Gor-Ray Ltd in the early 1930s following the success of its leading product, a gored, sunray-pleated skirt. Stillitz innovatively realised the ability to tailor skirts far more efficiently than his competitors to still provide the same hem circumference and fullness while eliminating excess material at the waist in producing the gored pattern, thus permitting the use of more expensive fabrics. Historically, pleats had been styled by folding and pressing the material, meaning that pleats inevitably lost their form and had to be periodically re-pressed in order to hold their shape; Stillitz introduced and patented new methods of permanently pleating material (permanising) whereby pleats would last as long as the garments themselves, technologies still relied upon in skirt manufacturing today. Moreover, the pleats were joined such that the skirts followed the natural contour of the hips without hanging loosely from the body, and were cut desirably wider towards the lower end to give a fashionably flared or rayed effect. Stillitz's innovations, such as reversible woollen skirts, adjustable hemlines and the ability to tailor skirts utilising far less material, permitted women to wear full-skirted fashions that would have otherwise been unavailable due to scarcity and rationing of material during the War; the popularity of this style was not able to be replicated until Dior's New Look in the 1950s, the difference being that Dior's designs required vastly more quantities of material. Gor-Ray's popular-selling lines such as Koneray and Furrl (so named for its ability to permit the wearer to swish and twirl the pleats effectively), which elegantly emphasised, slenderised and flattered the feminine figure, both led and revolutionised the British fashion industry between the 1940s and 1970s, making high-quality skirts affordable.

Stillitz expanded the company from his original premises in Hackney, purchasing an entire office block in New Bond Street to house new headquarters, with the company's factory located in Enfield. Gor-Ray swiftly emerged as Britain's leading skirt manufacturer, selling throughout Britain and worldwide within Western Europe and America, out-competing other contemporary skirt manufacturers. Gor-Ray retailed to upmarket department stores such as Fenwick, John Lewis, Lewis's, Selfridges and Tesco, and created the world's first boutique concession store selling within House of Fraser, a model quickly adopted by other retailers. Stillitz was entrepreneurially creative, registering patents for numerous improvements to garment hangars, display stands, pleating machines and, in 1951, inventing and popularising the spring-loaded, extendable, telescopic skirt hangar in use today.

A 1954 Gor-Ray advertisement advertising multiple product lines

=== Popular culture ===
With its tagline Skirts one better!, Gor-Ray skirts were influential throughout British culture in some circles were considered as household name known for innovative and stylish design. Gor-Ray label is still used as an evocation of the era and to indicate conferred status and fashionable sophistication upon the wearer.

== See also ==
- Stieglitz (surname)
- Montague Burton
- Michael Marks
