= Michael Plaskow =

English rabbi (1936–2023)

Michael Lionel Plaskow MBE
- Born: 8 July 1936; Mandatory Palestine
- Died: 2 April 2023 (aged 86); Netanya, Israel
- Occupations: Rabbi; mohel
- Known for: Minister of Woodside Park Synagogue (1956–2000); Assistant Grand Chaplain of the United Grand Lodge of England
- Awards: Norman B. Spencer Award (1992); Freeman of the City of London (1994); MBE (1998)

Rabbi Michael Lionel Plaskow MBE (8 July 1936 – 2 April 2023) was an English rabbi. Plaskow was Minister at Woodside Park Synagogue, 1956–2000 and served for over 40 years in the same synagogue in the United Synagogue. He was Chaplain to the Mayor of Barnet, 1999–2000. He was a Freemason, and an Assistant Grand Chaplain of the United Grand Lodge of England; he received the 1992 Norman B. Spencer award for research into Freemasonry. He became a Freeman of the City of London in 1994 and received an MBE in 1998.

He was also a mohel. He estimated that he performed nearly 2000 circumcisions, including several on sons of babies he had circumcised early in his career.

Being born in Palestine, he had always regarded himself as a Palestinian Jew. He had retired to Netanya.

During the COVID-19 pandemic, he became a rabbi. Plaskow died on 2 April 2023, at the age of 86.
