= Moses Hyamson =

Orthodox Jewish rabbi (1862–1949)

Rabbi Moses Hyamson
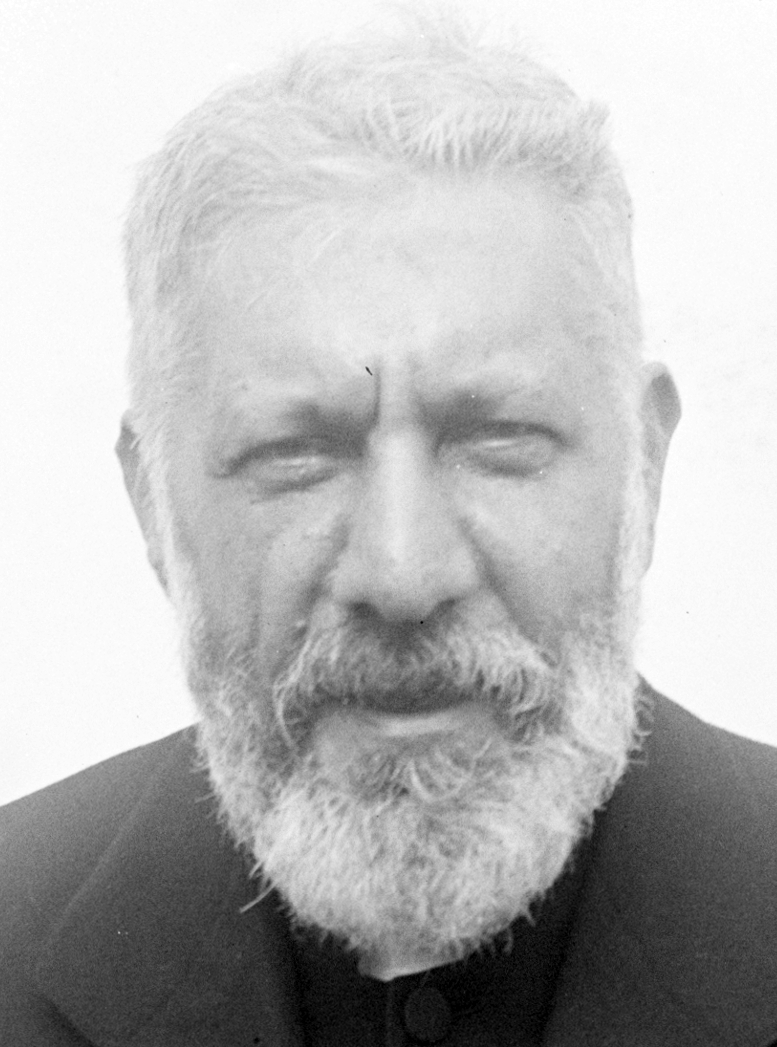
- Rabbi Moses Hyamson

Dayan of the London Beth Din

Rabbi of Congregation Orach Chaim, New York City
- In office 1913–1949

Personal life
- Born: September 3, 1862 Suvalk, Russia (now Poland)
- Died: June 9, 1949 (aged 86)
- Notable work(s): Translation of Duties of the Heart, Books I and II of Maimonides' Mishneh Torah
- Education: University College London
- Occupation: Rabbi, Talmudic scholar

Religious life
- Religion: Judaism
- Denomination: Orthodox

Rabbi Moses Hyamson (September 3, 1862 – June 9, 1949) was an Orthodox rabbi, former head Dayan of the London Beth Din and between 1911 and 1913, acting Chief Rabbi of the British Empire. He was renowned as a highly learned Hebrew scholar, author, translator, leader and erudite speaker.

== Biography ==
Rabbi Hyamson was born in Suvalk, Russia (now Poland); he emigrated to England in 1864. He was educated in Talmud by his father, Rabbi Nathan Haimsohn, and by Dayan Jacob Reinowitz of the London Beth Din. He married Sara Gordon at the Great Synagogue in London in 1892.

Rabbi Hyamson was ordained as Rabbi by Rabbi Hermann Adler through Jews' College, London. He also received several degrees from University College London. He received a Bachelor of Arts in 1882, a Bachelor of Laws in 1900, and a Doctor of Laws in 1912.

Rabbi Hyamson served as a Rabbi in Swansea, Bristol and Dalston, becoming a dayan of the London Beth Din. He was one of the eulogizers at the funeral of Rabbi Eliezer Gordon in 1910. He was the rival candidate of Rabbi Joseph H. Hertz for the permanent post of Chief Rabbi of the British Empire, to which the latter was appointed.

In 1913, Rabbi Hyamson was elected Rabbi of Congregation Orach Chaim in New York. He received a life contract and served his community until his death in 1949. His distinguished leadership contributed significantly to Jewish life in America and overseas. (Serendipitously, at Orach Chaim, Hyamson replaced Hertz, to whom he had lost the British appointment.)

Rabbi Hyamson founded the Board of Milah in New York in 1914, which grew to encompass Mohel certification, conferences on circumcision, and published studies. He was also an early leader of the Union of Orthodox Jewish Congregations of America. He helped in the founding of a local Hebrew school and the formation of the Central Relief Committee of the Agudas HaRabbanim, which provided European yeshivas with much needed assistance. The committee was the first of three organisations which developed into the Joint Distribution Committee.

Rabbi Hyamson led the battle to preserve shechita in America. He was president and a leading founder of "The League for Safeguarding the Fixity of the Sabbath". He helped prevent the legislation of Calendar Reform, which on an international level would have created a "wandering" Sabbath, changing to a different day of the week each year. Rabbi Hyamson met with President Herbert Hoover, and addressed Congress and the League of Nations.

Notwithstanding his formidably Orthodox credentials, Rabbi Hyamson was appointed Professor Emeritus of Codes at the Jewish Theological Seminary of America in 1915, serving until 1940. The divide at that time between Orthodox Judaism and the traditional wings of Conservative Judaism was not vast.

Rabbi Hyamson translated Duties of the Heart, Books I (and II posthumously) of Maimonides's Mishneh Torah, and "Collatio Mosaicarum et Romanarum Legum". He authored "The Oral Law" and numerous other writings on Jewish issues of the day.
