= The Jewish Quarterly Review =

Quarterly peer-reviewed academic journal covering Jewish studies

- Discipline: Jewish studies
- Language: English
- Edited by: David N. Myers, Natalie Dohrmann

Publication details
- History: 1889-present
- Publisher: The University of Pennsylvania Press (United States)
- Frequency: Quarterly

Standard abbreviations
- ISO 4: Jew. Q. Rev.

Indexing
- ISSN: 0021-6682 (print); 1553-0604 (web)
- LCCN: 12014315
- JSTOR: 00216682
- OCLC no.: 470181616

Links
- Journal homepage; Online access at Project MUSE

The Jewish Quarterly Review is a quarterly peer-reviewed academic journal covering Jewish studies. It is published by the University of Pennsylvania Press on behalf of the Herbert D. Katz Center for Advanced Judaic Studies (University of Pennsylvania). The editors-in-chief are David N. Myers (UCLA) and Natalie Dohrmann (University of Pennsylvania).

The journal was established in London in 1889 by Israel Abrahams and Claude G. Montefiore as an English-language concurrent of the French Revue des études juives, itself an outgrowth of the Wissenschaft des Judentums movement. In 1910, it was brought to Pennsylvania's Dropsie College, the predecessor of the Katz Center.

Jewish Quarterly Review is the oldest English-language journal of Judaic scholarship. It is available online through Project MUSE and JSTOR. As of 2026, the journal is open access.
