= Samuel Finer =

British political scientist and historian (1915–93)

Samuel Edward Finer FBA (22 September 1915 – 9 June 1993) was a British political scientist and historian specializing in comparative politics, who was instrumental in advancing political studies as an academic subject in the United Kingdom, pioneering the study of UK political institutions. His most notable work is The History of Government from the Earliest Times – a three-volume comparative analysis of all significant government systems. He was also a major contributor to the study of civil–military relations with the publication of his book, The Man on Horseback.

== Life ==
Samuel Finer, the youngest of six children, was born 22 September 1915 to Romanian-Jewish immigrant parents who had emigrated to the United Kingdom, and who ran a greengrocer's stall at Chapel Street market, Islington. His parents were killed in London in January 1945 by V-2 rockets. One of his brothers, Herman Finer, was also a distinguished political scientist and writer. Although Herman emigrated to the United States, his achievement was, according to Finer, an early source of inspiration.

Finer went to Holloway School, where he won a scholarship to Trinity College, Oxford. He obtained a double first in modern history and 'modern Greats' (PPE). After this, he began researching Sir Edwin Chadwick, a Benthamite civil servant. During World War II he served in the Royal Signals, where he attained the rank of captain. From 1946 to 1950, he taught politics at Balliol College, Oxford, acquiring an impressive reputation as a teacher and lecturer. From 1950 to 1966 he served as Professor of Political Institutions at the new University College of North Staffordshire (now Keele University). In 1966, he became head of the Department of Government at the University of Manchester, teaching Government and generally successfully contributing to the revival of the department's reputation. In 1974, he was made Gladstone Professor of Government at All Souls College. He retired from this post in 1982, but continued writing – see History of Government below.

He has been described as a charismatic lecturer and a very effective administrator. He believed that the academic study of politics required a firm grounding in history, and was sceptical of attempts to convert the subject into a science based on such deterministic frameworks as Marxism and behavioralism.

He was chairman of the Political Studies Association of the UK from 1965 to 1969 and was a vice-president of the International Political Science Association.

Samuel Finer was a passionate liberal democrat and supporter of the causes of electoral reform and Zionism. He was twice married and had two sons (one of whom is the musician Jem Finer) and one daughter. He died on 9 June 1993, aged 77, leaving a widow, Catherine.

(Most of the information in this section is derived from the collection-level description of the Samuel Finer Papers on the Archives Hub of the University of Manchester Special Collection.)

== The History of Government ==
Finer's magnum opus, The History of Government from the Earliest Times, is a comparative analysis of government systems, past and present. Polities covered include the Sumerian city states, the kingdom of Ancient Egypt, the Assyrian Empire, the kingdoms of Israel and Judah, the Persian Empire, the Classical Greek city republics, the republic and empire of Rome, the Chinese Empire under the Han, the Tang, the Ming and the Qing, the Byzantine Empire, the Arab Caliphate, Mamluk Egypt, the European feudal kingdoms (including the emergence of representative assemblies), the Italian Mediaeval/Renaissance city republics (e.g. Florence and Venice), Tokugawa Japan, the Ottoman Empire, the Mughal Empire, and the modern state as it emerged in Europe, including themes of absolute versus parliamentary monarchy, the transplantation of European state models overseas, the Age of Enlightenment, the American and French revolutions, the constitutionalisation of the European monarchies, and industrialisation.

The conceptual prologue includes a classification of government systems in terms of combinations of four elements: Palace (monarchy), Forum (democracy), Church (organised religion) and Nobility. Government is not analysed in isolation but explained in the context of economics, technology, agriculture, geography, religion, law, warfare, etc. – giving a picture of how a state works as a mechanism, explained in language designed for the general reader. Finer had hoped that it would be a single volume, but three volumes were published, about 1,700 pages in all.

History of Government occupied Finer's retirement years, 1982 to 1993. After a heart attack in 1987, he was able to complete 34 out of the projected 36 chapters; the missing two chapters would have been on the exportation of the modern state model outside the West, and on the variations on the theme of modern totalitarianism.

== Works ==
- A Primer of Public Administration, 1950 (ISBN 0-8371-9492-X, 1977)
- The Life and Times of Sir Edwin Chadwick, 1952 (ISBN 0-416-17350-0, 1970) – the outcome of Finer's postgraduate research
- Local Government in England and Wales (joint author), 1953 (ISBN 0-19-889159-8)
- Anonymous Empire: A Study of the Lobby in Great Britain, 1958 – a ground-breaking study of political lobbying in the UK
- Private Industry and Political Power, 1958
- Backbench Opinion in the House of Commons, 1955–59, 1961
- The Man on Horseback: The Role of the Military in Politics, 1962 (ISBN 0-86187-967-8, 1988) – short but very original
- Vilfredo Pareto: Sociological Writings (selector), 1966 – the writings of an Italian sociologist
- Comparative Government: An Introduction to the Study of Politics, 1970 (ISBN 0-14-021170-5, 1974) – a successful textbook
- Adversary Politics and Electoral Reform (editor), 1975 (ISBN 0-9504469-0-4)
- Five Constitutions: Contrasts and Comparisons (editor), 1979 (ISBN 0-14-022203-0)
- The Changing British Party System, 1945–1979, 1980 (ISBN 0-8447-3368-7)
- Parties and Interest Groups (audio cassette, joint author), 1982 (ISBN 1-86013-297-9)
- Electoral System (audio cassette, joint author), 1982 (ISBN 1-86013-296-0)
- Comparing Constitutions (editor), 1995 (ISBN 0-19-876344-1)
- The History of Government from the Earliest Times, 1997 (ISBN 0-19-822904-6 three-volume set, hardback) – Finer's retirement project and magnum opus, unfinished and published posthumously

== Personal life ==
He is the father of Pogues instrumentalist and composer Jem Finer. Jem adapted Samuel's translation of Guillaume Apollinaire's poem "Pont Mirabeau" to music for the Pogues' final album Pogue Mahone.

== See also ==
- List of political scientists
- List of historians
