= Israel Abrahams =

British Jewish scholar at Cambridge

Israel Abrahams (Hebrew: יִשְׂרָאֵל אַבְּרָהָםס, romanized: Yisraʾel ʾAvrahams; 26 November 1858 – 6 October 1925) was a British Jewish scholar of Jewish studies, including homiletics, Talmudics, Rabbinic literature, and Jewish history at Jews' College and the University of Cambridge. He wrote a number of classics on Judaism—most notably, Jewish Life in the Middle Ages (1896), a history of European Jews in the Middle Ages.

== Life and writings ==
He was educated at Jews' College, where his father Barnett Abrahams served as principal, and at University College, London. In 1881, he received the degree of MA from the University of London. Abrahams taught secular subjects as well as homiletics at Jews' College, and was appointed senior tutor of that institution in 1900. He was a forceful lecturer and an earnest lay preacher. As honorary secretary of the Jewish Historical Society of England and as a member of the Committee for Training Jewish Teachers, he was very active. He was also a member of the Committee of the Anglo-Jewish Association, and of several other institutions of the community. He co-founded the newspaper The Jewish Guardian.

Abrahams collaborated with Claude Montefiore to write the book Aspects of Judaism, which was published in 1895. His chief works were Jewish Life in the Middle Ages (1896) and Chapters on Jewish Literature (1898). In 1889, he became joint editor of the Jewish Quarterly Review and helped materially to raise the prestige of the publication. He was a prolific contributor to periodical literature, and was especially well known for his articles on literary subjects, which appeared weekly in the Jewish Chronicle under the title of "Books and Bookmen." He also contributed to the Encyclopaedia Biblica (1903).

In 1902, after teaching for several years at Jews' College, Abrahams succeeded Solomon Schechter, who was moving to New York to head the Jewish Theological Seminary of America, as reader in Talmudic and Rabbinic literature at the University of Cambridge. He received the honorary degree Master of Arts (MA) from the university in late May 1902.

In 1914, he published A Companion to the Authorised Prayer Book, a helpful commentary on and supplement to the prayer book edited by Simeon Singer. Singer himself had intended to write such a work, but died before he had progressed very far. Revised editions appeared in 1922 and 1932.

In 1922 he was invited to deliver the Schweich Lecture of the British Academy. The lectures were published under the title Campaigns in Palestine from Alexander the Great.

Abrahams died on 6 October 1925, at the age of 66. He was cremated on 8 October, and memorial services were held on 11 October (at the Liberal Jewish Synagogue in the City of Westminster) and 21 October (at the Senate House in the University of Cambridge). The library of the Liberal Jewish Synagogue would later be named after him.
