= Barnett Abrahams =

Barnett Abrahams (1831 – 15 November 1863) was the Principal of Jews' College, and a Dayan (rabbinic judge) in London.

Abrahams was born in Warsaw in 1831. His father emigrated to England in 1839, while he and his mother did so only in 1841; two more sons were born in 1843 and 1844.

Abrahams was educated by his father, and later by Chief Rabbi Nathan Marcus Adler. In 1849 he joined the yeshiva at Bevis Marks Synagogue (Spanish and Portuguese congregation). The elders there paid for him to attend the City of London School and University College London, from which he graduated BA. In 1851 he began to preach at Bevis Marks synagogue, acting as Hakham. He became assistant Dayan in 1854, and in 1856 was made head of its Beth Din. He was the youngest man to act as dayan in the London Jewish community and the first English Jewish minister to hold a British university degree.

Abrahams married in 1854. He had 6 children; Joseph and Moses became Jewish ministers, and Israel became an author and teacher. In 1858, on the resignation of Louis Loewe as headmaster of Jews' College, Abrahams succeeded him while continuing to carry out his religious duties.

Abrahams was most concerned about educating the young, and in 1860 he founded the Association for the Diffusion of Religious Knowledge, the precursor of the Jewish Religious Education Board.
