= Anglo-Jewish Association =

British Jewish organisation formed in 1871

- Abbreviation: AJA
- Formation: 2 July 1871; 154 years ago
- Type: Nonprofit organization
- Purpose: Promote social, moral, and intellectual progress among Jews; protection for Jews
- Location: United Kingdom
- Official language: English
- Website: anglojewish.org.uk

The Anglo-Jewish Association (AJA) is a British organisation. It was formed in 1871 for the 'promotion of social, moral, and intellectual progress among the Jews; and the obtaining of protection for those who may suffer in consequence of being Jews'. Many Anglo-Jewish businessmen, such as Jacob Behrens, were members.

== Former Presidents ==
- Jacob Waley (1871–1873)
- Baron Henry de Worms (1873–1886)
- Sir Julian Goldsmid (1886–1895)
- Claude Montefiore (1895–1922)
- O.E. d'Avigdor Goldsmid (Sir Osmond E. d'Avigdor Goldsmid) (1922–1926)
- Leonard G. Montefiore (1926–1939)
- Leonard Jacques Stein (1939–1949)
- Ewen E.S. Montagu (1949–)
- Victor Lucas
- Basil Bard (−1983)
- Clemens N. Nathan (1983–1989)
- Frederick Tuckman (1989–1995)

== Other former officers ==
- David Lindo Alexander
- Lucien Wolf

== See also ==
- American Jewish Committee
- Alliance Israélite Universelle
- World ORT
