= Solomon Schechter =

Moldavian-born rabbi and scholar (1847–1915)

Rabbi Solomon Schechter
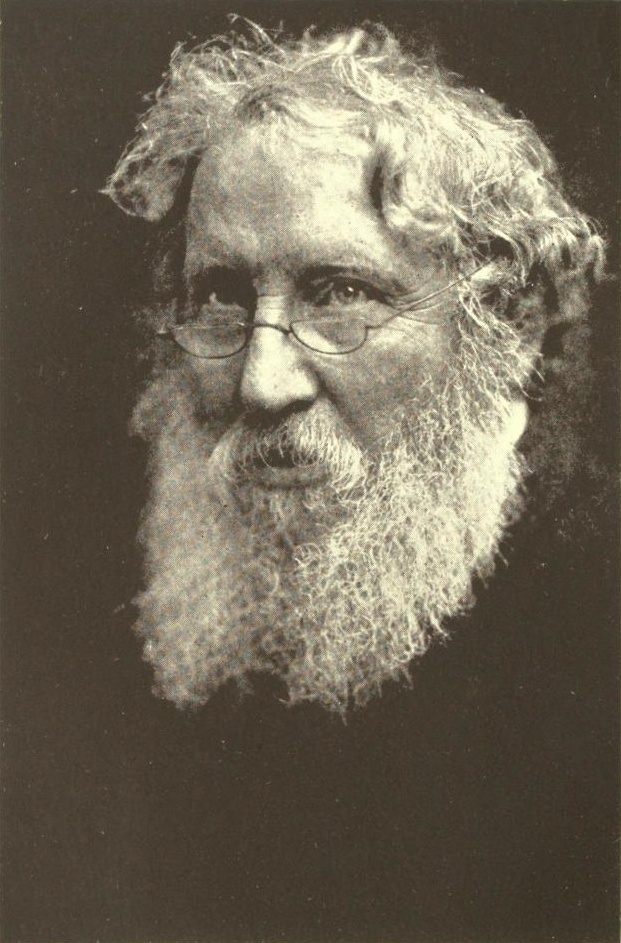

Personal life
- Born: 7 December 1847 Focșani, Principality of Moldavia
- Died: 19 November 1915 (aged 67) New York City, US
- Education: University of Cambridge; University of Vienna, Humboldt University of Berlin

Religious life
- Religion: Judaism

Solomon Schechter (Hebrew: שניאור זלמן הכהן שכטר; 7 December 1847 – 19 November 1915) was a Moldavian-born British-American rabbi, academic scholar and educator, most famous for his roles as founder and president of the United Synagogue of America, president of the Jewish Theological Seminary of America, and architect of American Conservative Judaism. He is an important figure in Jewish studies and Jewish history, particularly his study of the Cairo Geniza.

== Early life ==
He was born in Focșani, Moldavia (now Romania), to Rabbi Yitzchok Hakohen, a shochet ("ritual slaughterer") and member of Chabad hasidim. He was named after its founder, Shneur Zalman of Liadi. Schechter received his early education from his father. Reportedly, he learned to read Hebrew by age 3, and by 5 mastered Chumash. He went to a yeshiva in Piatra Neamț at age 10 and at age thirteen studied with one of the major Talmudic scholars, Rabbi Joseph Saul Nathanson of Lemberg. In his 20s, he went to the Rabbinical College in Vienna, where he studied under the more modern Talmudic scholar Meir Friedmann, before moving on in 1879 to undertake further studies at the Berlin Hochschule für die Wissenschaft des Judentums and at the University of Berlin. In 1882, he was invited to Britain, to be tutor of rabbinics under Claude Montefiore in London.

== Academic career ==
In 1890, after the death of Solomon Marcus Schiller-Szinessy, he was appointed to the faculty at Cambridge University, serving as a lecturer in Talmudics and reader in Rabbinics. The students of the Cambridge University Jewish Society hold an annual Solomon Schechter Memorial Lecture.

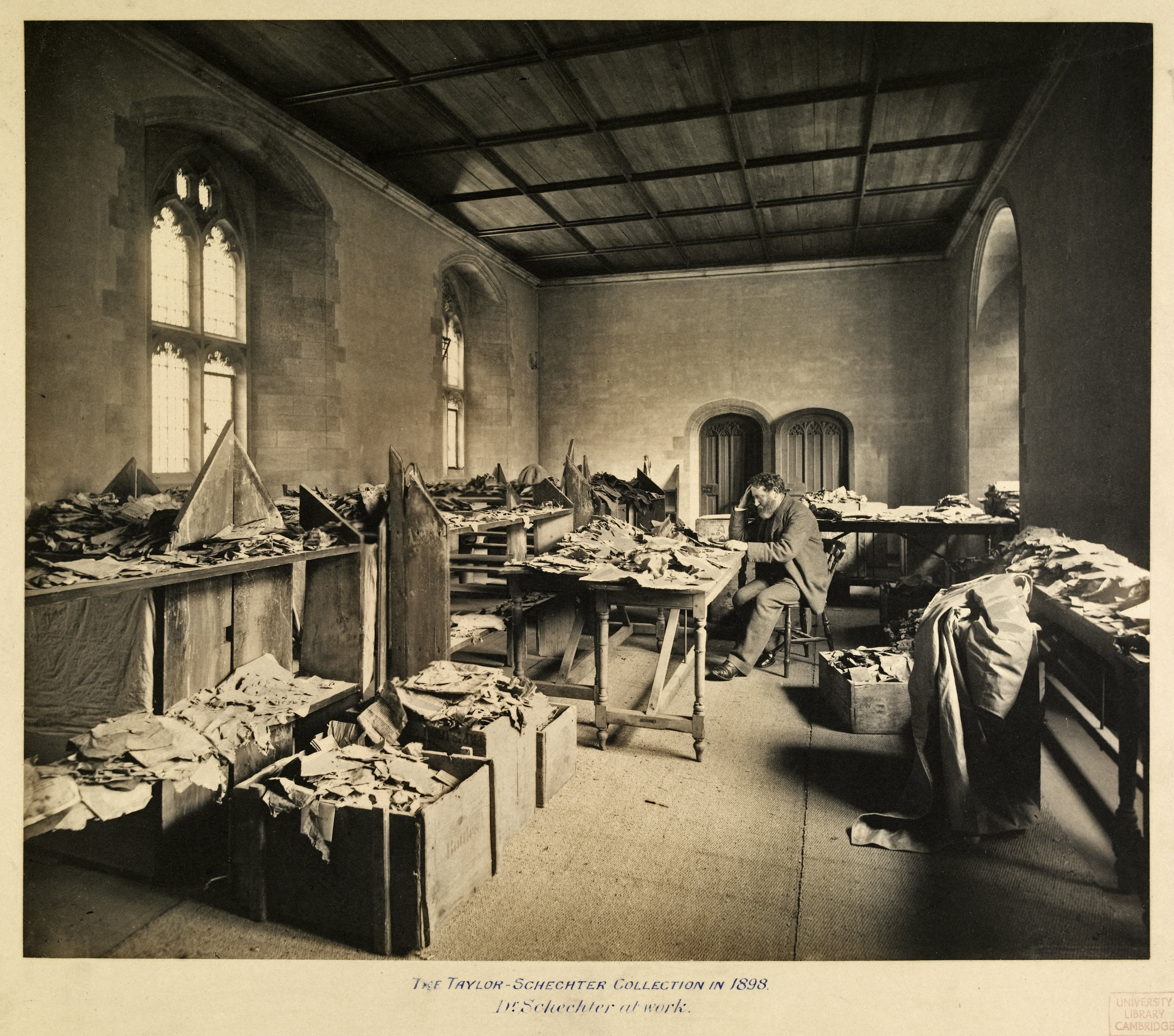
Solomon Schechter at work in Cambridge University Library, studying the fragments of the Cairo Geniza, c. 1898

His greatest academic fame came from his excavation in 1896 of the papers of the Cairo Geniza, an extraordinary collection of over 100,000 pages (around 300,000 documents) of rare Hebrew religious manuscripts and medieval Jewish texts that were preserved at an Egyptian synagogue. The find revolutionized the study of Medieval Judaism.

Jacob Saphir was the first Jewish researcher to recognize the significance of the Cairo Geniza, as well as the first to publicize the existence of the Midrash ha-Gadol. Schechter was alerted to the existence of the Geniza's papers in May 1896 by two Scottish sisters, Agnes and Margaret Smith (also known as Mrs. Lewis and Mrs. Gibson), who showed him some leaves from the Geniza that contained the Hebrew text of Sirach, which had for centuries only been known in Greek and Latin translation. Letters, written at Schechter's prompting, by Agnes Smith to The Athenaeum and The Academy quickly revealed the existence of another nine leaves of the same manuscript in the possession of Archibald Sayce at University of Oxford. Schechter quickly found support for another expedition to the Cairo Geniza, and arrived there in December 1896 with an introduction from the Chief Rabbi, Hermann Adler, to the Chief Rabbi of Cairo, Aaron Raphael Ben Shim'on. He carefully selected for the Cambridge University Library a trove three times the size of any other collection: this is now part of the Taylor-Schechter Collection. The find was instrumental in Schechter resolving a dispute with David Margoliouth as to the likely Hebrew language origins of Sirach.

Charles Taylor took a great interest in Solomon Schechter's work in Cairo, and the genizah fragments presented to the University of Cambridge are known as the Taylor-Schechter Collection. He was joint editor with Schechter of The Wisdom of Ben Sira, 1899. He published separately Cairo Genizah Palimpsests, 1900.

He became a Professor of Hebrew at University College London in 1899 and remained until 1902 when he moved to the United States and was replaced by Israel Abrahams.

== American Jewish community ==
In 1902, traditional Jews reacting against the progress of the American Reform Judaism movement, which was trying to establish an authoritative "synod" of American rabbis, recruited Schechter to become President of the Jewish Theological Seminary of America (JTSA).

Schechter served as the second President of the JTSA, from 1902 to 1915, during which time he founded the United Synagogue of America, later renamed as the United Synagogue of Conservative Judaism.

== Death ==
He died in 1915, and was buried at Mount Hebron Cemetery in Flushing, Queens.

== Religious and cultural beliefs ==
Schechter emphasized the centrality of Jewish law (Halakha) in Jewish life in his inaugural address as president of JTS in 1902:

Judaism is not a religion which does not oppose itself to anything in particular. Judaism is opposed to any number of things and says distinctly "thou shalt not." It permeates the whole of your life. It demands control over all of your actions, and interferes even with your menu. It sanctifies the seasons, and regulates your history, both in the past and in the future. Above all, it teaches that disobedience is the strength of sin. It insists upon the observance of both the spirit and of the letter; spirit without letter belongs to the species known to the mystics as "nude souls" (nishmatim artilain), wandering about in the universe without balance and without consistency...In a word, Judaism is absolutely incompatible with the abandonment of the Torah.

Schechter, on the other hand, believed in what he termed "Catholic Israel," meaning that Halakha is formed and evolves based on the behavior of the Jewish people. The concept of modifying the law based on national consensus is an untraditional viewpoint.

Schechter was an early advocate of Zionism. He was the chairman of the committee that edited the Jewish Publication Society of America Version of the Hebrew Bible.

== Legacy ==
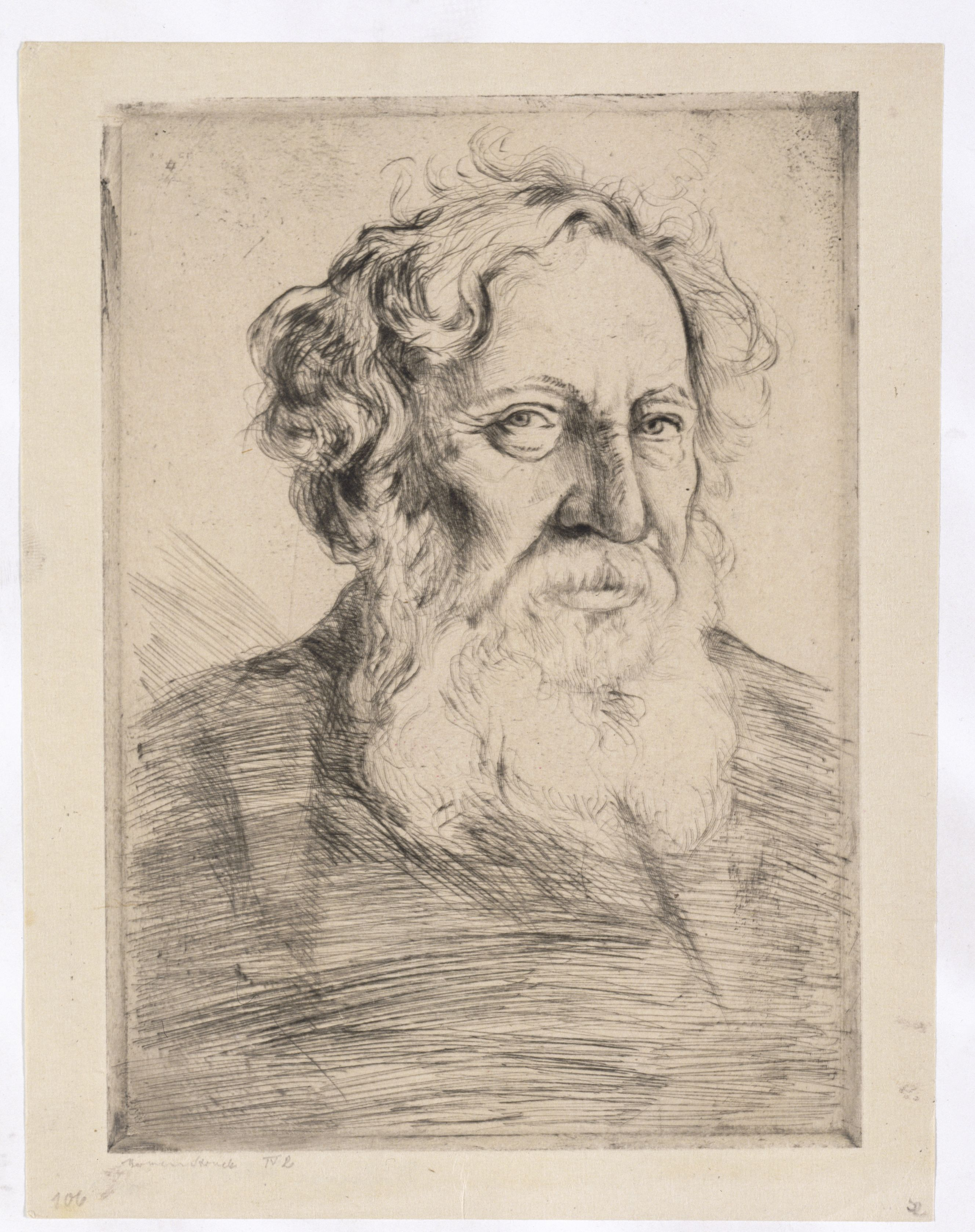
The late Solomon Schechter (1912/1913), etching by Hermann Struck

Schechter's name is synonymous with the findings of the Cairo Geniza. He placed the JTSA on an institutional footing strong enough to endure for over a century. He became identified as the foremost personality of Conservative Judaism and is regarded as its founder. A network of Conservative Jewish day schools is named in his honor, as well as a summer camp in Olympia, Washington. There are several dozen Solomon Schechter Day Schools across the United States and Canada.

His daughter Ruth wed South African Jewish politician Morris Alexander on June 10, 1907. They were married until 1935, when her radicalism and infidelity resulted in the couple's separation.

== Bibliography ==
- Schechter, Solomon (1896) Studies in Judaism. 3 vols. London: A. & C. Black, 1896-1924 (Ser. III published by The Jewish Publication Society of America, Philadelphia PA)
- Schechter, Solomon (1909) Some Aspects of Rabbinic Theology London: A. and C. Black (Reissued by Schocken Books, New York, 1961; again by Jewish Lights, Woodstock, Vt., 1993: including the original preface of 1909 & the introduction by Louis Finkelstein; new introduction by Neil Gilman [i.e. Gillman])
