= Desmond Hirshfield, Baron Hirshfield =

British accountant and trade union adviser

Desmond Barel Hirshfield, Baron Hirshfield (17 May 1913 – 6 December 1993) was a British accountant and trade union adviser.

Born in Birmingham, to a Jewish dentist and a music hall performer, Hirshfield was educated at eight schools, including the City of London School. He became a chartered accountant, senior partner of a firm (Hesketh, Hardy & Hirshfield), and was investment adviser to the Trade Union Congress advising unionists like Frank Cousins and Vic Feather. In 1951 he married Bronia Eisen. From the 1950s he became the consultant of leading Labour Party figures such as Herbert Morrison, Nye Bevan and Harold Wilson. He was the founder and Chairman of the Trades Union Unit Trust Managers Ltd. from 1961 to 1983. He was President of the accounting firm Horwath & Horwath International between 1977 and 1984, and its International President from 1984 to 1986. He also served as Deputy Chairman of the Northampton New Town Corporation, on the Salary Review Body and the Committee on Consumer Credit.

Hirshfield believed that capital and labour had a common interest and should act as one, and worked hard to prevent the adverse effects of new technological developments on general employment. On August 30, 1967, Hirshfield was created a life peer, as Baron Hirshfield, of Holborn in Greater London. Latterly he became President of Norwood, a Jewish orphanage charity originally based in the east end, and served on the Chevening Trust which oversaw the restoration of the house for the nation. In his time away from work he was a keen artist.

He died on 6 December 1993 aged 80.

== Coat of arms ==
Coat of arms of Desmond Hirshfield, Baron Hirshfield

Crest
On a mount Vert a demi-lion guardant and a demi-hart at gaze Proper supporting between them a balance Argent.
Escutcheon
Azure a menorah between two flaunches Or on each an oak leaf Vert charged with a bezant on a chief Or a dexter hand apaume couped at the wrist articulated of steel Proper representing the hand of an automatom between two cog-wheels Gules each charged with a human heart Argent.
Supporters
Dexter a lion rampant guardant Proper crowned with an eastern crown Or, sinister a hart at gaze Proper gorged with an eastern crown Or, the whole on a grassy mount with two madonna lilies slipped and leaved Proper.
Motto
Come Let Us Reason Together
