= Zemplínska Široká =

Village and municipality in Slovakia

Zemplínska Široká Kráskarebrény
- Municipality
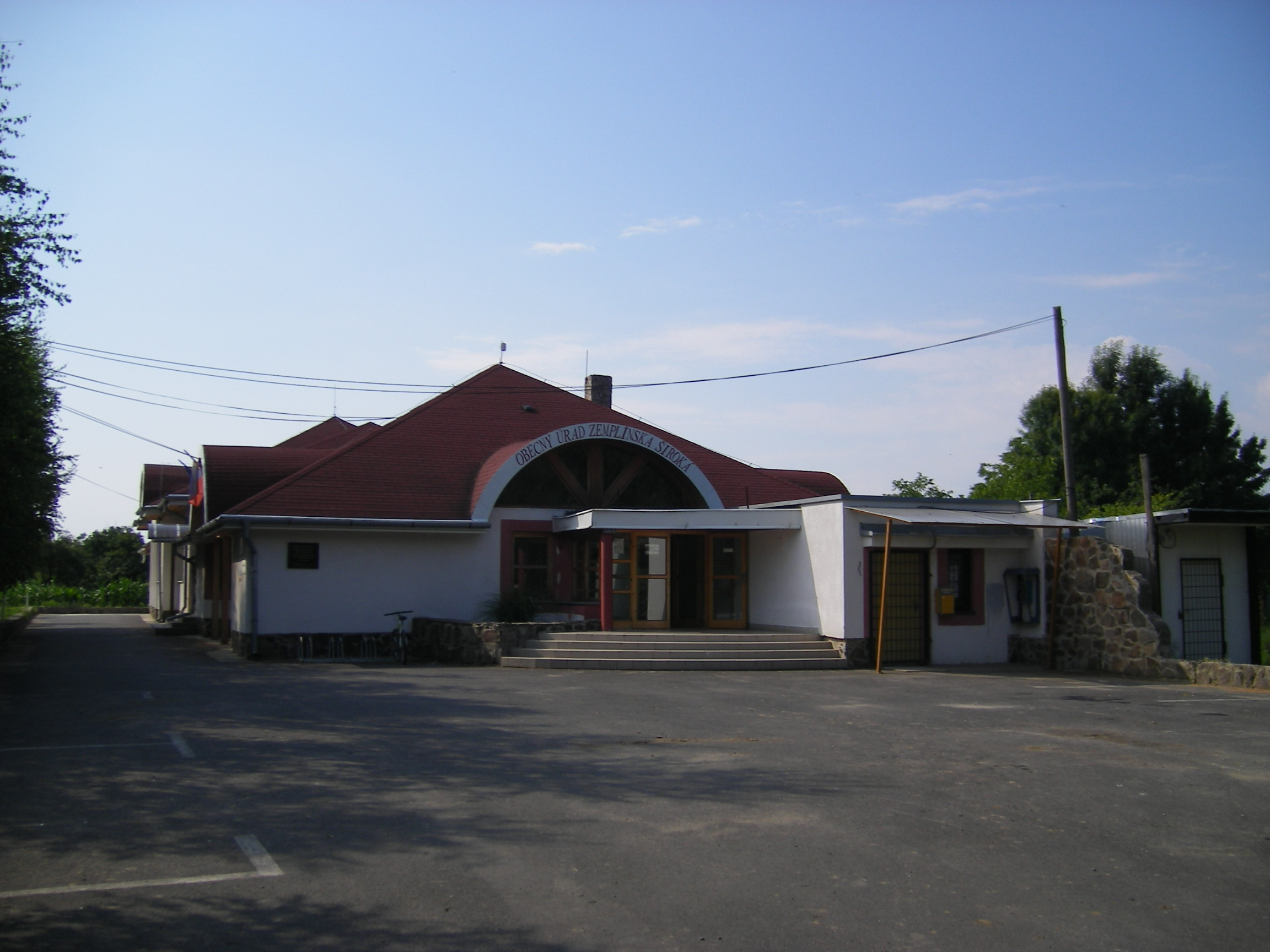

- Flag

- Location of Zemplínska Široká in the Košice Region Location of Zemplínska Široká in Slovakia
- Coordinates: 48.69°N 21.98°E
- Country: Slovakia
- Region: Košice Region
- District: Michalovce District
- First mentioned: 1266

Area
  - Total: 16.25 km^{2} (6.27 sq mi)
- Elevation: 103 m (338 ft)

Population (2025)
  - Total: 1,043
- Time zone: UTC+1 (CET)
  - Summer (DST): UTC+2 (CEST)
- Postal code: 721 2
- Area code: +421 56
- Vehicle registration plate (until 2022): MI
- Website: www.zemplinskasiroka.sk

Zemplínska Široká (Slovak: [ˈzempliːnska ˈʂirɔkaː]; Hungarian: Kráskarebrény) is a village and municipality in Michalovce District in the Kosice Region of eastern Slovakia. The village was previously named Rebrin from 1920 to 1960.

== History ==
In historical records the village was first mentioned in 1266.

== Geography ==
The municipality lies at an altitude of 103 metres (338 ft) and covers an area of 16.25 km^{2} (6.27 sq mi) (2025).

== Population ==
Population statistic (10 years)
Year	1995	2005	2015	2025
Count	806	874	955	1043
Difference		+8.43%	+9.26%	+9.21%

Population statistic
Year	2024	2025
Count	1025	1043
Difference		+1.75%

It has a population of 1043 people (31 December 2025).

=== Ethnicity ===
Census 2021 (1+ %)
Ethnicity	Number	Fraction
Slovak	917	93.38%
Not found out	52	5.29%
Rusyn	19	1.93%
Total	982	

In year 2021 was 982 people by ethnicity 917 as Slovak, 52 as Not found out, 19 as Rusyn, 9 as Romani, 4 as Ukrainian, 3 as Czech, 3 as Other, 2 as Polish, 2 as Hungarian and 1 as Vietnamese.

Note on population: The difference values of population numbers in the table "Population statistic" and in the sections "Ethnicity" & "Religion" is caused by the use of various statistical methods.

=== Religion ===
Census 2021 (1+ %)
Religion	Number	Fraction
Greek Catholic Church	299	30.45%
Roman Catholic Church	288	29.33%
Eastern Orthodox Church	123	12.53%
None	111	11.3%
Not found out	98	9.98%
Calvinist Church	34	3.46%
Evangelical Church	13	1.32%
Total	982	

In year 2021 was 982 people by religion 299 from Greek Catholic Church, 288 from Roman Catholic Church, 123 from Eastern Orthodox Church, 111 from None, 98 from Not found out, 34 from Calvinist Church, 13 from Evangelical Church, 7 from Jehovah's Witnesses, 1 from Old Catholic Church, 1 from Other and not ascertained christian church, 1 from Christian Congregations in Slovakia, 1 from Other, 1 from United Methodist Church, 1 from Church of the Brethren, 1 from Seventh-day Adventist Church, 1 from Buddhism and 1 from Baptists Church.

== Government ==
The village has its own birth registry office.

== Culture ==
The village has a small public library, and a football pitch.

== Economy ==
The nearest railway station is at Michalovce 6 kilometres away.

== See also ==
- List of municipalities and towns in Michalovce District
- List of municipalities and towns in Slovakia
