= Claude Montefiore =

British Jewish leader and scholar (1858–1938)

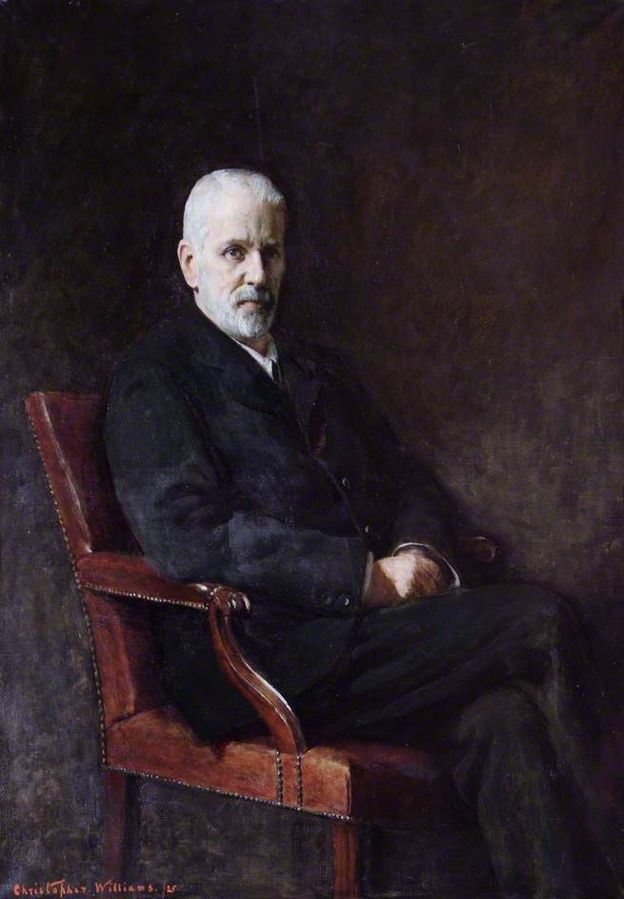
- 1925 painting
- Born: 6 June 1858; London, England
- Died: 9 July 1938 (aged 80); Marylebone, London, England
- Education: Balliol College, Oxford
- Occupation: Scholar
- Spouse(s): Therese Alice Schorstein; Florence Fyfe Brereton Ward (m. 1902)
- Children: Leonard G. Montefiore
- Relatives: Sir Moses Montefiore (paternal great-uncle); Annie Henrietta Yorke (cousin)

Claude Joseph Goldsmid Montefiore, also Goldsmid–Montefiore or just Goldsmid Montefiore (1858–1938), was the founding president of the World Union for Progressive Judaism, an early anti-Zionist leader, and is credited as the intellectual founder of Liberal Judaism in the United Kingdom. A scholar of the Hebrew Bible, rabbinic literature and the New Testament, his work significantly influenced many aspects of modern Jewish religious thought, Jewish-Christian relations, and Anglo-Jewish socio-politics. Montefiore was President of the Anglo-Jewish Association and co-founded the anti-Zionist League of British Jews in 1917.

== Family ==
Claude Montefiore was born in London on 6 June 1858, the youngest son of Nathaniel Montefiore and Emma Goldsmid. He had three siblings: Alice Julia, Charlotte Rosalind, and Leonard. He was the great-nephew of Sir Moses Montefiore.

Montefiore's first wife was Therese Alice Schorstein, with whom he had one child, Leonard G. Montefiore. Therese's premature death in 1889 would inspire Montefiore to establish an endowment in her memory; the Therese Montefiore Memorial Prize. The prize is awarded each year to eligible students at Girton College, Cambridge, the school she had attended.

In July 1902, Montefiore married his second wife, Florence Fyfe Bereton Ward, in a ceremony that took place at the West London Synagogue. Florence held a position of Vice-Mistress at Girton College, after initially working in the college as a librarian.

Claude Montefiore died at his home in Marylebone on 9 July 1938.

== Education ==
Montefiore obtained a first-class honours degree from Balliol College, Oxford, graduating in 1881. During this period of study, he came under the influence of Benjamin Jowett and T. H. Green.

In 1882, Montefiore was briefly enrolled in a Reform seminary school in Berlin. However, influenced by his studies in Anglican religious thinking and critical biblical studies at Oxford, he left the seminary school after six months, returning to London and dedicating himself to scholarly and philanthropic pursuits.

== Teachings and positions ==
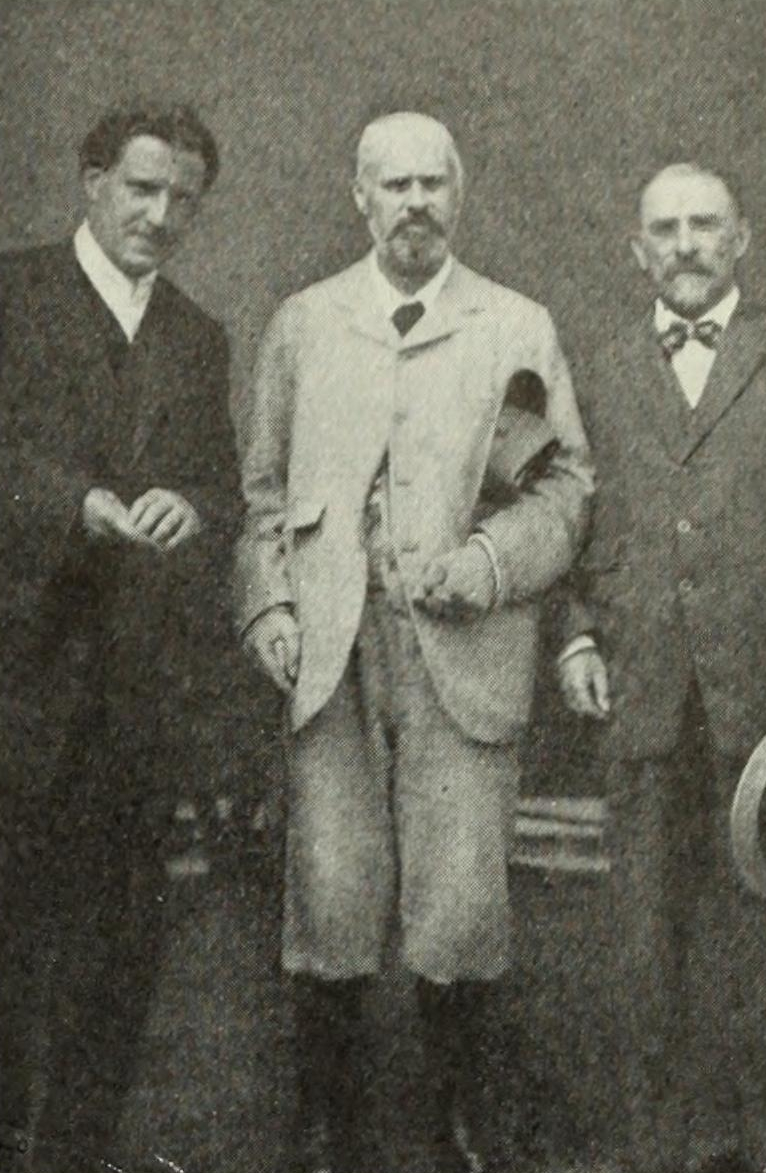
Montefiore (center) with Stephen Wise (left) and Henry Morgenthau c. 1913

Despite leaving the seminary, Montefiore continued to provide spiritual lessons and occasionally provide sermons in a lay capacity.

In 1886, he was asked by the board of the Hibbert Trust to prepare a course of lectures to be delivered in 1892, the results of which would be collectively titled "The Origin of Religion as Illustrated by the Ancient Hebrews." This lecture series was followed by the publication of a sermon series co-authored with Israel Abrahams in 1894. Montefiore and Abrahams would go on to co-found The Jewish Quarterly Review, an academic journal dedicated to scholarship on Jewish studies which is still published four times a year by the University of Pennsylvania Press.

Among Jewish religious leaders, Montefiore was unusual for the time and energy he devoted to the study of Christianity. He provoked considerable controversy for, what many perceived to be, an overly sympathetic attitude towards Jesus and Paul of Tarsus. Among other things, he wrote a two-volume commentary on the Synoptic Gospels in the early part of the twentieth century, What A Jew Thinks about Jesus, published in 1935, and Judaism and St. Paul (1914).

Montefiore was one of the leading authorities on questions of education. Montefiore was mainly instrumental in enabling Jewish pupil teachers at elementary schools to enjoy the advantages of training in classes held for the purpose at the universities.

Montefiore showed great sympathy with all liberal tendencies in Jewish religious movements in London and was president of the Jewish Religious Union. He was also president of the World Union for Progressive Judaism from 1926 until his death.

He ranked as one of the leading philanthropists in the Anglo-Jewish community and held office in various important bodies.

Montefiore's scholarly legacy has long been considered controversial by religious scholars and theologians, particularly in light of his dedicated interest in what would become known as Christian–Jewish reconciliation.

== Collections ==
The Montefiore Family Papers were initially deposited in the Montefiore Museum in Judith Lady Montefiore College, Ramsgate, Kent. In 1961 the Montefiore Endowment deposited the papers of Montefiore Family at the Mocatta Library of University College London. The archive spans 24 volumes and 515 items. The papers comprise correspondence, account books, and a private appointment diary. Also included are many testimonials and centenary tributes to Montefiore thanking him for his generosity; these have been digitised.

== Functions ==
- Member of the School Board for London
- President of the Froebel Society and the Jews' Infant School, London (1904), and a member of numerous other educational bodies
- Member of the council of Jews' College
- Member of the Jewish Religious Education Board
- Acting President of University College Southampton (1910-1913) and the President from 1913 to 1934
- President of the Anglo-Jewish Association (1892-1921)
- Member of the Council of the Jewish Colonization Association

== Works ==
- The Hibbert Lectures; On the Origin and Growth of Religion as Illustrated by the Religion of the Ancient Hebrews (London: Williams & Norgate, 1893).
- The Bible for Home Reading (London: Macmillan, 1899).
- Some Elements in the Religious Teaching of Jesus (London: Macmillan, 1910).
- Outlines of Liberal Judaism (London: Macmillan, 1912).
- Judaism and St. Paul; Two Essays (London: Max Goschen Ltd, 1914).
- Liberal Judaism and Hellenism and Other Essays (London: Macmillan, 1918).
- Race, nation, religion and the Jews (Keiley: Rydal Press, 1918).
- The Old Testament and After (London: Macmillan, 1923).
- The Synoptic Gospels, 2nd edn, 2 vols (London: Macmillan, 1927).
- Studies in Memory of Israel Abrahams (New York: Jewish Institute of Religion, 1927).
- Rabbinic Literature and Gospel Teachings (London: Macmillan, 1930).
- The Synoptic Gospels (New York: K.T.A.V. Publishing House, 1968), with ‘Prolegomenon’ by Lou H Silberman.
- A Rabbinic Anthology (ed., w. Herbert Loewe, London: Macmillan, 1938).

== Sources ==
- Daniel Langton, Claude Montefiore: His Life and Thought (ISBN 0-85303-369-2) (London: Vallentine Mitchell Press, 2002).
- Dunia Garcia-Ontiveros,, History Today
- Edward Kessler,, European Judaism, Vol. 34, No. 1
- Steven Bayme, "Claude Montefiore, Lily Montagu and the Origins of the Jewish Religious Union", Jewish Historical Society of England, Vol. 27, (1978–1980), pp. 61–71 JSTOR 29778897
