= List of people buried at Willesden Jewish Cemetery =

Coordinates: 51.5447°N 0.2399°W

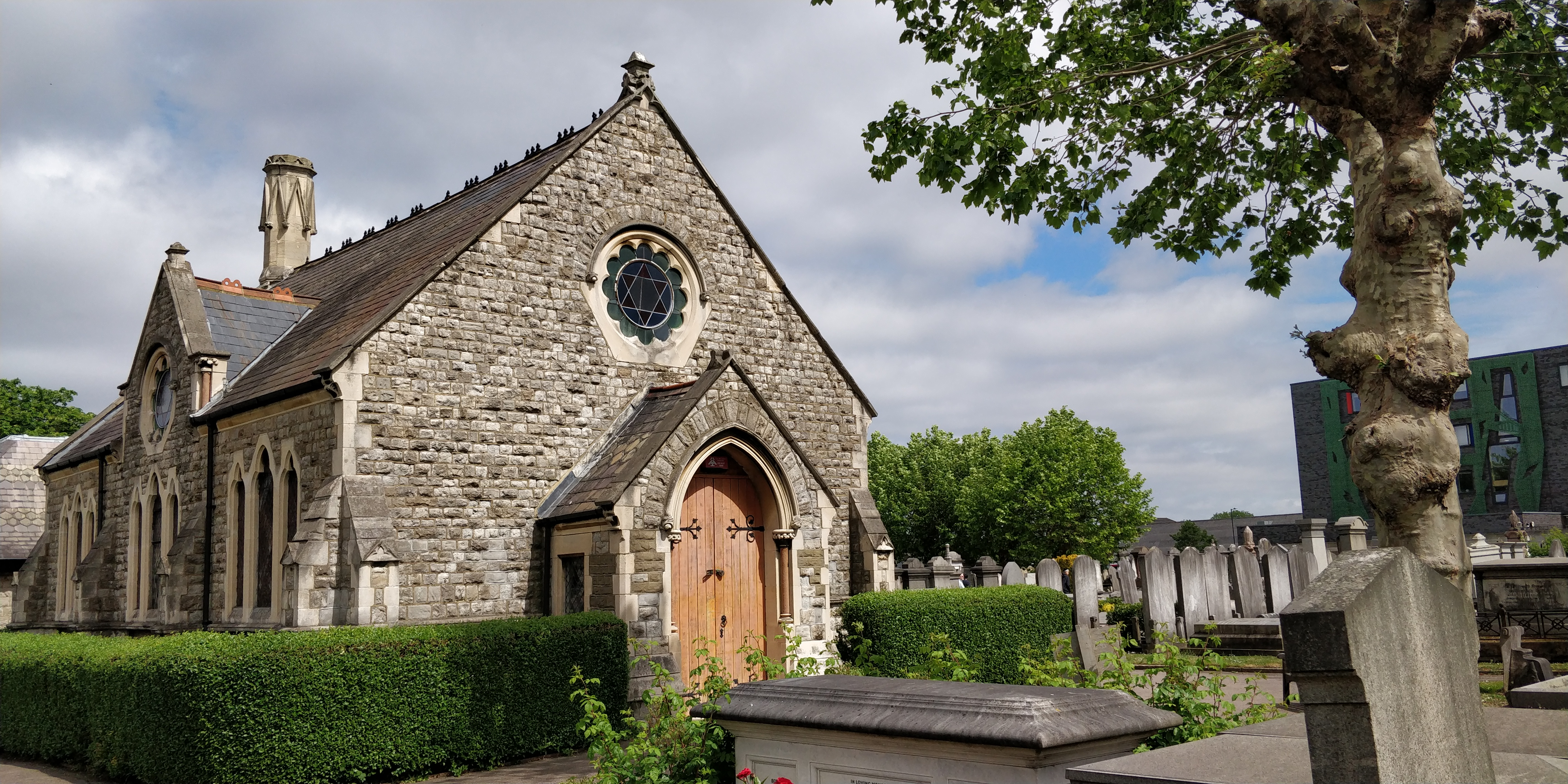
The cemetery's prayer hall, designed by Nathan Solomon Joseph

This is a list of people buried at Willesden Jewish Cemetery at Beaconsfield Road, Willesden, in the London Borough of Brent, England. Willesden Jewish Cemetery, which opened in 1873, has 29,800 graves; three of the tombs, including that of Rosalind Franklin, are listed at Grade II by Historic England.

The cemetery has 33 Commonwealth service war graves from World War I, (Note: Eight of the Commonwealth service war graves from World War I are soldiers who were from, or had a connection to, Australia. Page, Beth. "Willesden – Brent: Willesden Jewish Cemetery". WW1 Australian soldiers & nurses who rest in the United Kingdom.) six of which form a small group by the assembly hall, and 77 from World War II, 22 of them grouped in a war graves plot. These include the grave of Dudley Joel (1904–1941), businessman and Conservative Party politician, who joined the Royal Naval Volunteer Reserve and was killed in action in World War II.

== Grade II listed burial tombs ==
Grade II listed monument	Dates	Description and notes	Ref	Grave	Images	
The tomb of Maximilian (Max) Eberstadt	1844–1891	Designed by Edward Burne-Jones, the monument includes a cut branch motif, indicating a life cut short. Eberstadt, who was born in Germany, and whose father, Ferdinand Eberstadt (1808–1888), a textile merchant, was mayor of Worms, was secretary to the British merchant banker Ernest Cassel. His twin sister, Elizabeth, was a close friend of Burne-Jones; she married Sir George Lewis, 1st Baronet (see under Other notable burials: Lawyers, below) and she and her husband are both buried beside Max Eberstadt's tomb.				
The tomb of Rosalind Franklin	1920–1958	Franklin, a chemist and X-ray crystallographer, was a co-discoverer of the structure of DNA. She died of ovarian cancer in 1958, aged 37.				
The tombs and burial enclosures of Baron Mayer Amschel de Rothschild; Juliana, Baroness Mayer de Rothschild; and Hannah Primrose, Countess of Rosebery	Mayer Amschel 1818–1874; Juliana 1831–1877; Hannah Primrose 1851–1890	Baron de Rothschild was a businessman and Liberal Party MP. He is buried alongside his wife Juliana and their daughter Hannah Primrose, who became Countess of Rosebery and a political hostess and philanthropist. Their tombs were housed in a mausoleum constructed in the 1890s, but this was destroyed by a World War II bomb in 1941.		Grave of Hannah Primrose, Countess of Rosebery	Cartoon of Baron Mayer Amschel de Rothschild	Hannah, Countess of Rosebery, painted by Frederic, Lord Leighton

== Other notable burials ==
Some of the other notable persons interred at the cemetery include:

=== Architects ===
Name	Dates	Description	Notes	Ref	Image
Nathan S. Joseph	1834–1909	Philanthropist, social reformer, architect and Jewish communal leader	Nathan Joseph designed this cemetery and was the lead architect for Sandys Row Synagogue in the East End of London. He collaborated on the design of a number of other important synagogues, including the Garnethill Synagogue in Glasgow, New West End Synagogue in Bayswater, London, and Hampstead Synagogue. He was also noted for his work in designing improved housing for the poor.		

=== Artists and art dealers ===
Name	Dates	Description	Notes	Ref	Grave	Image
Joseph Joel Duveen	1843–1908	Art dealer and benefactor of art galleries	Duveen was born in Meppel in the Netherlands. He and his brother Henry were art dealers, securing the chief American trade in Oriental porcelain. They helped in the formation of many significant art collections in the United States and took an important share in the fine art trade in London, extending their interests in old tapestry, of which they became the largest purchasers. Joseph Duveen became wealthy, and was generous in benefaction of art galleries. In 1908 he undertook the cost of an extension to the Tate Gallery (now Tate Britain) that allowed its paintings by J. M. W. Turner to be displayed, and was called the Turner Wing.			
Joseph Duveen, 1st Baron Duveen	1869–1939	Art dealer	Joseph Duveen, the eldest son of Joseph Joel Duveen, greatly increased the trade in bringing great works of art from Europe to America, playing a large part in forming many of the collections that are now in American museums.			
Mark Gertler	1891–1939	Painter of figure subjects, portraits and still-life	Gertler's early life and his relationship with Dora Carrington were the inspiration for Gilbert Cannan's 1916 novel Mendel: a story of youth. The characters of Loerke in D. H. Lawrence's 1920 novel Women in Love and Gombauld in Aldous Huxley's 1921 novel Crome Yellow were based on him.			
Lily Delissa Joseph, née Solomon	1863–1940	Artist and social campaigner active in the English suffrage movement	Joseph was born in Bermondsey, London into a wealthy, cultured Jewish family. Her elder brother was the artist Solomon Joseph Solomon. Educated at the Ridley School of Art and the Royal College of Art, she painted portraits, interiors and urban landscapes in a style influenced by Impressionism. She was also an activist in both the women's suffrage movement and in support of Jewish charities. She was among the founders of the Ladies' Guild at the Hammersmith Synagogue in west London and also ran reading rooms in the Whitechapel area.			
Isaac Snowman	1873–1947	Artist	Snowman was commissioned to paint portraits of King George V and Queen Mary. He also painted on Jewish cultural themes.			
Simeon Solomon	1840–1905	Painter associated with the Pre-Raphaelites	Simeon Solomon, noted for his depictions of Jewish life and same-sex desire, is regarded a significant figure in the nineteenth-century's Pre-Raphaelite, Aesthetic and Symbolist movements. His grave at the cemetery was restored in 2014, with a design that "pays tribute to his 1870 watercolour, The Sleepers and One Who Watcheth".			
Solomon Joseph Solomon	1860–1927	Painter, a founding member of the New English Art Club and a member of the Royal Academy	Solomon made an important contribution to the development of camouflage in the First World War, working in particular on tree observation posts and arguing tirelessly for camouflage netting.			

=== Lawyers ===
Name	Dates	Description	Notes	Ref	Images	
David Lindo Alexander	1842–1922	Barrister and Jewish communal leader	Alexander, who was President of the Board of Deputies of British Jews, later co-founded the anti-Zionist League of British Jews. He is buried next to his wife Hester.			
Sir George Jessel	1824–1883	Judge	Jessel was one of the most influential commercial law and equity judges of his time, and served as the Master of the Rolls. He was the first Jew to be a regular member of the Privy Council and to hold high judicial office.			
Sir George Lewis, 1st Baronet and his wife Elizabeth, Lady Lewis, (née Eberstadt)	1833–1911 1844–1931	Solicitor Socialite	Lewis had by far the largest practice in financial cases of any lawyer in London, and was especially expert in libel cases, being retained by some of the chief newspapers. He was conspicuous in the prosecution of Madame Rachel and was selected by the Parnell Commission to conduct the case for Charles Stewart Parnell and the Irish Party against The Times. One of the last cases he was involved in personally was the Archer-Shee case in 1908, the 14-year-old naval cadet accused of stealing a five-shilling postal order, the basis of Terence Rattigan's play The Winslow Boy. In their London home, Sir George and Lady Lewis met "tout le monde". Their biographer, John Juxon described it: "Over the next thirty years this house was to be thronged with painters, sculptors, musicians, actors, writers, lawyers, politicians, indeed...to be invited to 'Lady Lewis's' was to enter a social milieu at once fluid and eclectic...Here the establishment and Bohemia had to embrace – because Elizabeth wanted them to."		Portrait of Sir George Lewis, John Singer Sargent, 1896	Elizabeth Lewis (née Eberstadt), John Singer Sargent, 1892

=== Medical doctors ===
Name	Dates	Description	Notes	Ref	Image
Asher Asher	1837–1889	Medical doctor	Asher was the first Scottish Jew to enter the medical profession. In London, he was secretary of its Great Synagogue, and then the first secretary of the United Synagogue.		
William Moses Feldman	1880–1939	Medical doctor and astronomer	Born in Pinsk (now in Belarus), Feldman became an expert on child health in Britain. A keen astronomer, he was elected a Fellow of the Royal Astronomical Society.		

=== Musicians ===
Name	Dates	Description	Notes	Ref	Image
Gerald Bright	1904–1974	Bandleader	Known professionally as "Geraldo", Bright became one of the most popular British dance band leaders of the 1930s with his "sweet music" and his "Gaucho Tango Orchestra". He modernised his style in the 1940s and continued to enjoy great success. In the 1950s he composed Scotlandia, Scottish Television's start-up music, heard daily at the beginning of programmes until the 1980s. He is buried alongside his wife, Manya Leigh.		
Jane Joseph	1894–1929	Composer, arranger and music teacher	Jane Joseph was a pupil and later associate of the composer Gustav Holst, and was instrumental in the organisation and management of various of the music festivals which Holst sponsored. Many of her works were composed for performance at these festivals and similar occasions. Her early death at the age of 35, which prevented the full realisation of her talents, was considered by her contemporaries as a considerable loss to English music.		
Sam Mayo	1877–1938	Music hall entertainer, pianist and songwriter	Born Samuel Cowan, Mayo developed a unique comic style as a music hall singer. Dressed in a long overcoat or dressing gown, he sang deadpan at the piano with quirky, lugubrious humour. He became billed as "The Immobile One". Mayo mostly wrote his own songs, and provided other entertainers with material. He held the record for appearing at the greatest number of music halls in a single evening: nine performances at nine London venues on the evening of 21 January 1905.		
Edward Solomon	1855–1895	Composer, conductor, orchestrator and pianist	Edward Solomon died aged only 39, by which time he had written dozens of works for the stage, many of them for the D'Oyly Carte Opera Company, including The Nautch Girl (1891). Early in his career, he collaborated frequently with Henry Pottinger Stephens. He had a bigamous marriage with the American actress and singer Lillian Russell in the 1880s.		
Giulia Warwick (born Julia Ehrenberg)	1857–1904	Opera and concert singer and professor of music at the Guildhall School of Music	In her four years at the Carl Rosa Opera Company Giulia Warwick made 224 appearances in 17 operas.		

=== Politicians ===
Name	Dates	Description	Notes	Ref	Images
Henrietta "Nettie" Adler	1868–1950	Liberal local government politician	Nettie Adler was one of the first women to be elected to and to be able to take her seat on the London County Council. Her father, Rabbi Hermann Adler and her grandfather, Nathan Marcus Adler, are also buried at this cemetery.		
Sir Charles Solomon Henry, 1st Baronet	1860–1919	Australian expatriate businessman and Liberal Member of the British Parliament	After cremation at Golders Green Crematorium, Henry's ashes were buried in this cemetery.		
Barnett Janner, Baron Janner	1892–1982	Liberal (later Labour) MP and peer	Born in what is now Lithuania, Barnett Janner was brought up in Wales and practised as a solicitor before standing for Parliament. He was President of the Board of Deputies of British Jews from 1955 to 1964.		
Greville Janner, Baron Janner of Braunstone	1928–2015	Labour MP and peer	Greville Janner, son of Barnett Janner, co-founded the Holocaust Educational Trust and chaired the Board of Deputies of British Jews from 1978 to 1984.		
Dudley Joel	1904–1941	Businessman, Conservative MP and World War II naval officer	With the outbreak of World War II, Joel joined the Royal Naval Volunteer Reserve and was killed in action on 28 May 1941 when the steam merchant HMS Registan was bombed by German aircraft off Cape Cornwall.		
James Armand de Rothschild	1878–1957	Liberal Party MP and philanthropist	Rothschild donated IL6 million towards the construction of the Knesset building in Jerusalem, which was completed in 1966. When he died in 1957, he bequeathed Waddesdon Manor (which he had inherited in 1922) to the National Trust.		
Lionel de Rothschild and Charlotte von Rothschild	1808–1879 1819–1884	Banker, Liberal MP and philanthropist Socialite	Lionel de Rothschild was the first practising Jew to sit as a member of parliament in the United Kingdom. Charlotte, his German-born first cousin, was a member of the Rothschild banking family of Naples. They married two days after her seventeenth birthday. Charlotte Freifrau de Rothschild became one of England's most prominent socialites; her dinner invitations, according to biographer Stanley Weintraub, were favoured over those from Buckingham Palace. In an era when male and female roles were clearly defined, Charlotte had been better educated in art than her husband and was instrumental in their art assemblage. Their grave is marked by a "handsome granite memorial", and is surrounded by a stone enclosure designed by the architect George Devey.		
Lionel Nathan de Rothschild	1882–1942	Banker, Conservative MP and gardener	Describing himself as "a banker by hobby – a gardener by profession", de Rothschild created Exbury Gardens by the New Forest in Hampshire. He also co-sponsored plant-hunting expeditions overseas to collect seed for plant growth and experimentation, developing 1,204 new hybrids of rhododendron and azalea.		
Nathan Mayer Rothschild, 1st Baron Rothschild	1840–1915	Banker, Liberal MP and philanthropist	The eldest son of Lionel de Rothschild and Charlotte von Rothschild, Nathan Mayer Rothschild became head of the London branch of the family bank, N M Rothschild & Sons, after his father's death in 1879. In 1885, when he was raised to the peerage by William Ewart Gladstone, Rothschild was the first Jewish member of the House of Lords not to have previously converted to Christianity. A noted philanthropist, he was heavily involved with the foundation of the Four Per Cent Industrial Dwellings Company, a model dwellings company whose aim was to provide decent housing, predominantly for the Jews of Spitalfields and Whitechapel. He also served as a trustee of the London Mosque Fund until his death.		
Lionel Walter Rothschild, 2nd Baron Rothschild	1868–1937	Banker, politician, zoologist and prominent Zionist leader	Rothschild was presented with the Balfour Declaration which pledged British support for a Jewish national home in Palestine, and was President of the Board of Deputies of British Jews from 1925 to 1926.		
Herbert Samuel, 1st Viscount Samuel	1870–1963	Politician	Samuel, who was leader of the Liberal Party from 1931 to 1935, was the first nominally-practising Jew to serve as a Cabinet minister and to become the leader of a major British political party. He was also the last member of the Liberal Party to hold one of the four Great Offices of State (as Home Secretary from 1931 to 1932 in the National Government of Ramsay MacDonald). He also served as a diplomat, and became High Commissioner for Palestine.		
Sir Julius Vogel	1835–1899	Prime Minister of New Zealand	New Zealand's first Jewish Prime Minister (two other New Zealanders of Jewish descent have held the premiership), Vogel was also the first New Zealander to write a science-fiction novel. Anno Domini 2000, or, Woman's Destiny, published in 1889, anticipated a Utopian world where women held many positions of authority. Four years later, and six years before Vogel died, New Zealand became the first country to give women the vote.		

=== Rabbis ===
Name	Dates	Description	Notes	Ref	Image
Hermann Adler	1839–1911	Rabbi	Adler was born in Hanover, Germany. He was the second son of Rabbi Nathan Marcus Adler (see below) and succeeded him as Chief Rabbi of the British Empire, a post he held from 1891 to 1911.		
Michael Adler	1868–1944	Rabbi, Anglo-Jewish historian and author	Michael Adler, who was not related to the family of chief rabbis, was the first Jewish military chaplain to the British Army to serve in time of war, serving with the British Expeditionary Force on the Western Front during the First World War from 1915 to 1918. He was responsible for the Magen David, instead of the traditional Cross, being carved on the headstones of Jewish soldiers who died in wartime.		
Nathan Marcus Adler	1803–1890	Rabbi	Born in Hanover, in present-day Germany, Adler became Chief Rabbi of the City of Hanover. From 1844 to 1890 he was Chief Rabbi of the British Empire. He was instrumental in bringing together the United Synagogue, established by Act of Parliament in 1870, and was a founder of the National Society for the Prevention of Cruelty to Children.		
Sir Israel Brodie	1895–1979	Rabbi	Brodie was Chief Rabbi of Great Britain and the Commonwealth 1948–1965. He founded and led the Conference of European Rabbis. In 1969, after he had retired, he was knighted "for services to British Jewry", the first Chief Rabbi to receive this honour.		
Sir Hermann Gollancz	1852–1930	Rabbi and Hebrew scholar	Gollancz, who was born in Bremen, Germany, was the first Jew to earn a doctorate of literature from London University and the first holder of the degree to be ordained as a rabbi. In 1923, he was the first British rabbi to be given a knighthood.		
Joseph Hertz	1872–1946	Rabbi and biblical scholar	Hertz, who was born in what is now Slovakia, was Chief Rabbi of the United Kingdom from 1913 until his death in 1946, in a period encompassing both world wars and the Holocaust. He also edited a notable commentary on the Torah (1929–36, one-volume edition 1937). Popularly known as the Hertz Chumash, this classic Hebrew-English edition of the Five Books of Moses, with corresponding Haftorahs, is used in many synagogues and classrooms throughout the English-speaking world.		
Simeon Singer	1846–1906	Rabbi, preacher, lecturer and public worker	Singer is best known for his English translation of the Siddur, the standard prayer book used in British and Commonwealth synagogues, informally known as the "Singer's Prayer Book" or the "Singer's".		

=== Other ===
Name	Dates	Description	Notes	Ref	Image
Barney Barnato (born Barnet Isaacs)	1852–1897	Diamond and gold-mining entrepreneur	The son of a second-hand clothes dealer in Spitalfields, Barney Barnato went to South Africa as a young man to seek his fortune. He died in mysterious circumstances; records state that he was lost overboard near the island of Madeira, while on a passage home to England. His body was recovered from the sea and he was buried here at Willesden. His son Isaak (1894–1918), who was a captain in the Royal Flying Corps in the First World War and died in the 1918 flu pandemic, is also buried in this cemetery.		
Sir Charles Clore	1904–1979	Financier, retail and property magnate and philanthropist	The son of a Whitechapel tailor, Charles Clore owned, through Sears Holdings, the British Shoe Corporation and Lewis's department stores (which included Selfridges), as well as investing heavily in property. His philanthropic trust, the Clore Foundation, is a donor to arts and Jewish community projects in Britain and abroad. The Clore Gallery at Tate Britain, which houses the world's largest collection of the works of J. M. W. Turner, was built in 1980–87 with £6 million from Clore and his daughter and £1.8 million from the British government.		
Edgar Israel Cohen	1853–1933	Businessman	Cohen was a sponge and cigar merchant, who later became involved with retail, entertainment, and popularised the motorised London taxicab. He was associated with the flotation of several family owned businesses of the period including Harrods departmental store. A close friend of the British-American socialite, actress and producer Lillie Langtry, he provided funding for her theatrical ventures.		
Jack Cohen	1898–1979	Grocer and entrepreneur	Cohen was the founder of Tesco supermarkets.		
Eliza Davis	1817–1903	Anti-semitism campaigner	Davis is notable for her correspondence (published in 1918, after her death) with the novelist Charles Dickens about his depiction of Jewish characters in his novels. She was married to James Phineas Davis, a banker, who, in 1860, had bought Tavistock House in London from Dickens.		
Sir Barrow Helbert Ellis	1823–1887	Anglo-Indian civil servant	Ellis held several prominent posts in India during the time of British colonial rule. The Ellis Bridge in Ahmedabad, Gujarat was named after him.		
Constance Flower (née Rothschild), Lady Battersea	1843–1931	Society hostess and philanthropist	The elder daughter of Sir Anthony and Lady Louise de Rothschild, she married Cyril Flower (1843–1907), a property developer and Liberal Party politician who later became Lord Battersea. She established the Jewish Association for the Protection of Girls, Women and Children in 1885 and was prominent in the temperance movement.		
Isidore Gluckstein	1851–1920	Businessman	He was a director of Salmon & Gluckstein tobacco merchants, and one of the founders of J. Lyons and Co.		
Horace Goldin	1873–1939	Stage magician	Born Hyman Elias Goldstein in Vilnius, he was noted for his lightning-fast presentation style. He achieved international fame with his versions of the sawing a woman in half illusion.		
Albert Goldsmid	1846–1904	Soldier	Colonel Goldsmid was the highest ranking Jewish officer in the British Army in the 19th century. He founded the Jewish Lads' Brigade (in 1895) and the Maccabaeans.		
Lily Hanbury	1873–1908	Actress	Hanbury reached the peak of her popularity by playing a number or parts in Shakespearian plays, mainly under the management of Wilson Barrett and Herbert Beerbohm Tree. She died of medical complications following the delivery of a stillborn child. Her remains were cremated and her ashes interred at this cemetery.		
Catherine Gasquoine Hartley	1866/7–1928	Writer, art historian and headmistress	Hartley was a writer and art historian with a particular expertise on Spanish art. After her divorce from the writer and journalist Walter M. Gallichan, she wrote about polygamy, motherhood and sex education.		
Michael Henry	1830–1875	Journalist and mechanician	Henry served as editor-in-chief of The Jewish Chronicle from 1868 to 1875.		
Sir Samuel Instone	1878–1937	Shipping and aviation entrepreneur	He and his brother Alfred founded the pioneering Instone Air Line.		
Harry ("Jim") Joel	1894–1992	Businessman and racehorse owner	Joel was a great-nephew of Barney Barnato (see above) and a director of De Beers diamond company.		
Lewis Joel	1824–1899	Diplomat	Joel served as a British Consul and Vice-Consul for over 30 years, mainly in South America.		
Sir Emmanuel Kaye	1914–1999	Industrialist and philanthropist	Born in Russia, Kaye was founder and chairman of the Kaye Organisation and joint-founder of Lansing Bagnall Ltd, which manufactured electric lift trucks; he was also founder and chairman of the Thrombosis Research Institute. He is buried alongside his wife, Lady (Elizabeth) Kaye (née Cutler; 1925–2012).		
Hannah Poland later Lemel	1873-1942	Bird conservationist	Hannah was Honorary Secretary and the first honorary member of the Royal Society for the Protection of Birds.		
Sir Joseph Lyons	1847–1917	Caterer	He was the founder of J. Lyons and Co., a restaurant chain, food manufacturing and hotel conglomerate created in 1884 that dominated British mass-catering in the first half of the twentieth century.		
Sir Eric Merton Miller	1926–1977	Businessman	Miller, an associate of Labour Prime Minister Harold Wilson, committed suicide while under investigation for fraud, shooting himself in the head on Yom Kippur.		
Louis Montagu, 2nd Baron Swaythling	1869–1927	Financier, farmer and political activist	He became head of the family banking business and was president of the Federation of Synagogues. An active anti-Zionist, Louis Montagu opposed the Balfour Declaration.		
Sir Matthew Nathan	1862–1939	Soldier and colonial administrator	Nathan served as Governor of Hong Kong, Sierra Leone, Gold Coast, Natal and Queensland. He was Under-Secretary for Ireland from 1914 to 1916, and was responsible, with the Chief Secretary, Augustine Birrell, for the administration of Ireland in the years immediately preceding the Easter Rising.		
Alfred Charles de Rothschild	1842–1918	Banker	Alfred de Rothschild was the first Jew to be a director of the Bank of England.		
Sir Anthony de Rothschild, 1st Baronet	1810–1876	Financier	The United Synagogue's first president when it was formed in 1870, Anthony de Rothschild was extensively involved with the financing of European railways.		
Charles Rothschild	1877–1923	Banker and entomologist	Charles Rothschild was regarded as a pioneer of nature conservation in Britain, and is credited with establishing the UK's first nature reserve after buying Wicken Fen, near Ely, in 1899.		
Dorothy Mathilde de Rothschild (née Pinto)	1895–1988	Philanthropist and activist for Jewish affairs	Dorothy Pinto was known to her friends as "Dolly". When she was 17 she married her cousin James Armand de Rothschild, a member of Paris branch of the Rothschild banking family. She assisted her husband in his political campaigns. After his death in 1957, she continued her husband's Zionist interests and was a close friend of Chaim Weizmann. She became chairman of Yad Hanadiv, the Rothschild family charities in Israel, and saw through her husband's gift of funds to build the Knesset and her own gift of the Supreme Court of Israel building.		
Leopold de Rothschild	1845–1917	Banker and race horse breeder	Leopold de Rothschild became head of the London branch of N M Rothschild when his uncle, Baron Mayer de Rothschild, died in 1874.		Caricauture of de Rothschild, publishd in Vanity Fair in 1884
Sarah Rachel Russell or Leverson or Levison, best known as "Madame Rachel"	c.1814–1880	Criminal, blackmailer and con artist	Born to a Jewish theatrical family in London, a cousin of the musician Henry Russell, Sarah Rachel Russell was twice married and later lived with, and took the surname of, Philip Levison. She worked as a clothes dealer and later sold cosmetics and toilet requisites which she claimed would guarantee their users everlasting youth. Using her salon as a front, she was able to blackmail many of her wealthy and prominent members of London's social elite. She was convicted for fraud in 1868, serving four years in prison, and was sentenced to further imprisonment in 1878, dying in Woking prison. Her grave is hard to find, and does not have a headstone.		
Nina Salaman and Redcliffe N. Salaman	1877–1925 1874–1955	Poet, translator, and social activist Botanist and potato breeder	Nina Salaman is best known for her English translations of medieval Hebrew poetry, especially of the poems of Judah Halevi. The Chief Rabbi officiated at her funeral and delivered a eulogy, customarily forbidden on Rosh Hodesh except at the funeral of an eminent scholar. Redcliffe Salaman's landmark work was the 1949 book on the History and Social influence of the Potato, which established the history of nutrients as a new literary genre.		
Harriet Samuel (née Wolfe)	1836–1908	Businesswoman	Harriet Samuel was the founder of H. Samuel, one of the United Kingdom's best-known high street jewellery retailers.		
Marcus Samuel, 1st Viscount Bearsted	1853–1927	Banker and businessman	A founder of Shell Oil Co., Marcus Samuel was elected Lord Mayor of London in 1902.		
Sir Michael Sobell	1892–1993	Businessman, philanthropist and racehorse breeder	Born in Boryslav, Galicia, Sobell manufactured radio receivers. His company became one of Britain's largest manufacturers of TV sets, subsequently merging with The General Electric Company plc (GEC). He was also a very successful owner and breeder of thoroughbred racehorses. He set up the Sobell Foundation which supported many causes, including medical, educational, and fitness endeavours. Sobell died at the age of 100 and bequeathed most of his fortune to his charitable foundation.		Bust of Sir Michael Sobell at Sobell Leisure Centre, Aberdare, Wales
Sir Bernard Nathaniel Waley-Cohen, 1st Baronet	1914–1991	Businessman	Waley-Cohen was a director of the Palestine Corporation, which British businessmen founded in 1922 to encourage the economic development of Mandate Palestine (much of which is now the State of Israel). He was the 633rd Lord Mayor of London, elected in 1960.		
Michael Winner	1935–2013	Film director, restaurant critic	Michael Winner's grave has the inscription "NEVER A LOSER BE, ONLY A WINNER HE".		
Julian Wylie (Julian Ulrich Samuelson Metzenberg)	1878–1934	Theatrical agent and producer	"The king of pantomime"		
Annie Henrietta Yorke (née) du Rothschild)	1844–1926	Philanthropist and temperance reformer	Daughter of Sir Anthony de Rothschild, 1st Baronet and sister of Constance, Lady Battersea		

== See also ==
- United Synagogue
- Willesden Jewish Cemetery
- Liberal Jewish Cemetery, Willesden
- Willesden New Cemetery
- Jewish cemeteries in the London area
