= Louisa de Rothschild =

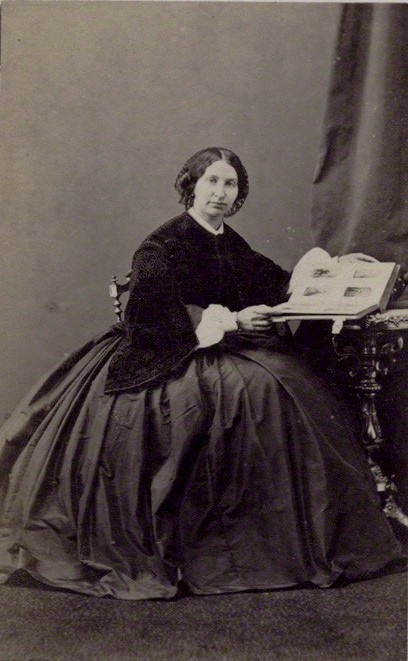
Louisa, née Montefiore, Lady de Rothschild

Louisa de Rothschild (née Montefiore), Lady de Rothschild (28 May 1821 – 22 September 1910), was an Anglo-Jewish philanthropist, and founding member of the Union of Jewish Women.

== Family ==
Born on 28 May 1821 in London, England, Lady de Rothschild was the daughter of Abraham Joseph Eliaz Montefiore of Stamford Hill, and his wife Henrietta Montefiore (née Rothschild), the daughter of Mayer Amschel Rothschild. She had three full siblings and a half-sister.

She married Sir Anthony de Rothschild, 1st Baronet of Tring Park in 1840, the son of Nathan Mayer Rothschild and Hanna Barent Rothschild (née Cohen). They had two daughters: Constance and Annie Henrietta.

Constance became Constance Flower, Lady Battersea on her marriage to Liberal politician and property developer Cyril Flower, 1st Baron Battersea and Overstrand. They had no children, and in 1902, Lord Battersea was embroiled in a major homosexual scandal that was suppressed by the Balfour Government.

Annie Henrietta married the politician Hon. Eliot Constantine Yorke (1843–1878), son of Charles Yorke, 4th Earl of Hardwicke.

== Philanthropy ==
Lady de Rothschild was influential and able to push conventions that traditionally bound Jewish women at the time. She founded the first independent Jewish women's philanthropic associations in England, the Jewish Ladies' Benevolent Loan Society and the Ladies' Visiting Society in London in 1840.

In 1885, Lady de Rothschild and Helen Lucas jointly paid for the cost of a nurse to work among the poor who were Jewish. Lucas would pay for two more in 1891 and 1892 and they were encouraged to use a traditional common sense approach to the help and sympathy they offered. Lucas believed that relief workers should give little priority to statistics or paperwork.

== Death ==
Lady de Rothschild died in 1910 at Aston Clinton House, Aylesbury, England. She was buried in the Willesden United Synagogue Cemetery in Brent, London.
