= Liberal Jewish Cemetery, Willesden =

Jewish cemetery in London

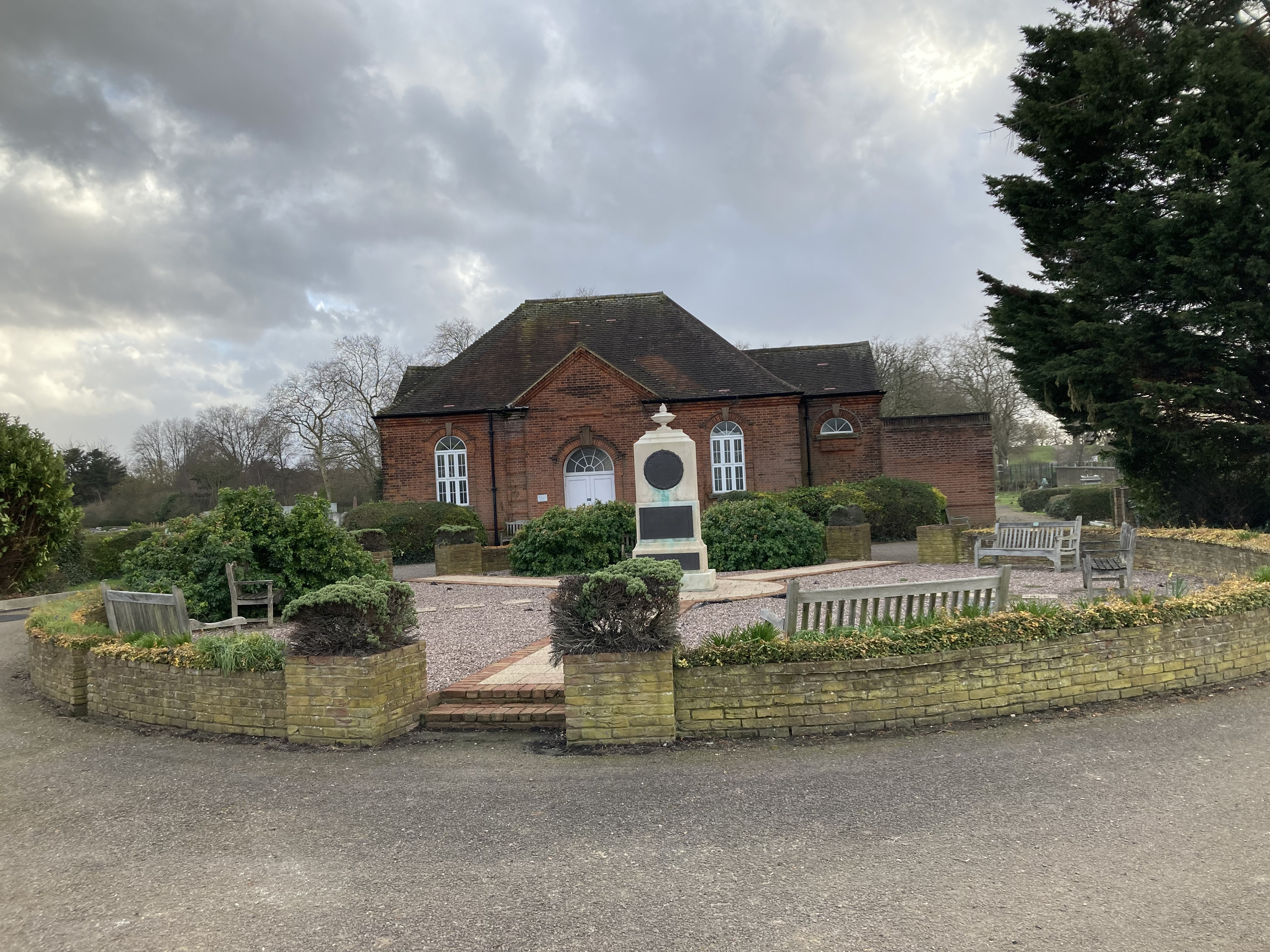
- Interactive map of Liberal Jewish Cemetery, Willesden

Details
- Established: 1911
- Location: Off Pound Lane, Willesden, London NW10 2HG (London Borough of Brent)
- Country: England
- Coordinates: 51°32′35″N 0°14′16″W
- Type: Jewish
- Style: Queen Anne Revival architecture
- Owned by: Liberal Jewish Synagogue
- Size: 4 acres
- Website: Liberal Jewish Synagogue: Cemetery
- Find a Grave: Liberal Jewish Cemetery

The Liberal Jewish Cemetery, Willesden, is a cemetery for Jews in Pound Lane, Willesden, in the London Borough of Brent. It is adjacent to Willesden United Synagogue Cemetery. Established in 1911 by the Liberal Jewish Synagogue, it opened in 1914 and was originally known as the Liberal Jewish and Belsize Square Cemetery. Several notable British Jews, including members of the Sassoon family and the Rothschild family, are buried at the cemetery, which also has a Grade II listed war memorial.

== Prayer hall and war memorial ==
The cemetery's prayer hall, in Queen Anne Revival architectural style, was designed by Ernest Joseph and erected in the 1920s; it was extended in 1963. Directly opposite the prayer hall is a Grade II listed war memorial, commemorating 22 people who died in the First World War. Historic England describe it as "one of very few freestanding First World War memorials which specifically commemorate Jewish service personnel". A plaque was added later to commemorate those who died in the Second World War.

== Notable burials ==
Notable people buried at the cemetery include:

Image	Name	Dates	Description	Notes	Ref	Grave
	Sir Louis Baron, 1st Baronet	1876–1934	Tobacco and cigarette manufacturer	He was the managing director of the Carreras Tobacco Company.		
	Bernard Delfont, Baron Delfont	1909–1994	Theatre impresario	Brother of Leslie Grade and Lee Grade.		
	Benno Elkan	1877–1960	Sculptor	Elkan created the first statue in Britain of Sir Walter Raleigh, and designed Frankfurt's Great War Memorial, incorporating mourning mothers as a symbol of loss in World War I; it was removed by the Nazis in 1933 and re-erected in 1946. His work also includes the Knesset Menorah in Jerusalem.		
	Arnold Goodman, Baron Goodman	1913–1995	Lawyer	Goodman was Chairman of the Arts Council.		
	Lew Grade, Baron Grade	1906–1998	TV and film producer	Elder brother of Bernard Delfont		
	Leslie Grade	1916–1979	Theatrical agent	Younger brother of Bernard Delfont and Lew Grade		
	Otto Metzger	1885–1961	Engineer and inventor	Metzger, who grew up in Nuremberg, Germany, was an engineer and inventor of an impact-extrusion process for forming seamless zinc and brass cans. He and his wife Sophie Metzger (née Josephthal) (1894–1998) are commemorated in the cemetery by adjacent rose bushes.		
	Sir Albert Sassoon, 1st Baronet	1818–1896	Businessman and philanthropist	He ran the family firm, which was originally based in Bombay, India and became known as David Sassoon & Co. Sassoon was originally buried in the Sassoon Mausoleum which he had built in Brighton, but in 1933 his body was removed and reburied at this cemetery.		
	Sir Edward Sassoon, 2nd Baronet	1856–1912	Businessman and politician	He was the eldest son of Sir Albert. A Liberal Unionist Party MP, Sassoon was also active in Jewish community affairs, serving as a vice-president of Jews' College, London and the Anglo-Jewish Association.		
	Frank Schon, Baron Schon of Whitehaven	1912–1995	Industrialist	Born in Vienna, and moved to Britain in March 1939.		
	Sir Isaac Shoenberg	1880–1963	Electronics engineer and inventor	Born in Pinsk, Imperial Russia (now in Belarus), Shoenberg is best known for his role in inventing the system used by the BBC in London in 1936 for the world's first public high-definition TV broadcast.		
	Sir Andrew Shonfield	1917–1981	Economist	Best known for writing Modern Capitalism (1966), a book that documented the rise of long-term planning in postwar Europe. From 1972 to 1977 he was Director of the Royal Institute of International Affairs, usually known as Chatham House.		
	Conchita Supervía	1895–1936	Spanish opera diva	Supervía was a highly popular Spanish mezzo-soprano singer who appeared in opera in Europe and America and also gave recitals. Her tombstone was designed by Sir Edwin Lutyens. The grave, which had fallen into disrepair, was refurbished by a group of admirers and re-consecrated in October 2006.		
	Walter Wolfgang	1923– 2019	Socialist and peace activist	Wolfgang was vice-president and Vice Chair of the Campaign for Nuclear Disarmament up to the time of his death, and a supporter of the Stop the War Coalition.		
	Israel Zangwill	1864–1926	Author and cultural Zionist	At the forefront of cultural Zionism during the 19th century, and a close associate of Theodor Herzl, Zangwill later rejected the search for a Jewish homeland in Palestine and became the prime thinker behind the territorial movement.		

== War graves ==
The cemetery contains the Commonwealth war graves of a World War I Royal Flying Corps officer and, from World War II, a Royal Navy officer, two soldiers and an officer of the British Army and an airman and two officers of the Royal Air Force.

== See also ==
- Jewish cemeteries in the London area
- Willesden United Synagogue Cemetery, usually known as Willesden Jewish Cemetery, which is adjacent to this one
- Willesden New Cemetery
- Liberal Judaism (United Kingdom)
