= LJS =

LJS may refer to:

- Long John Silver's restaurant chain
- Liberal Jewish Synagogue, St John's Wood, London
- Lance Jacob Strulovitch (born 1998), Canadian racing driver who goes by Lance Stroll
