= Annie Henrietta Yorke =

English philanthropist and temperance reformer (1844–1926)

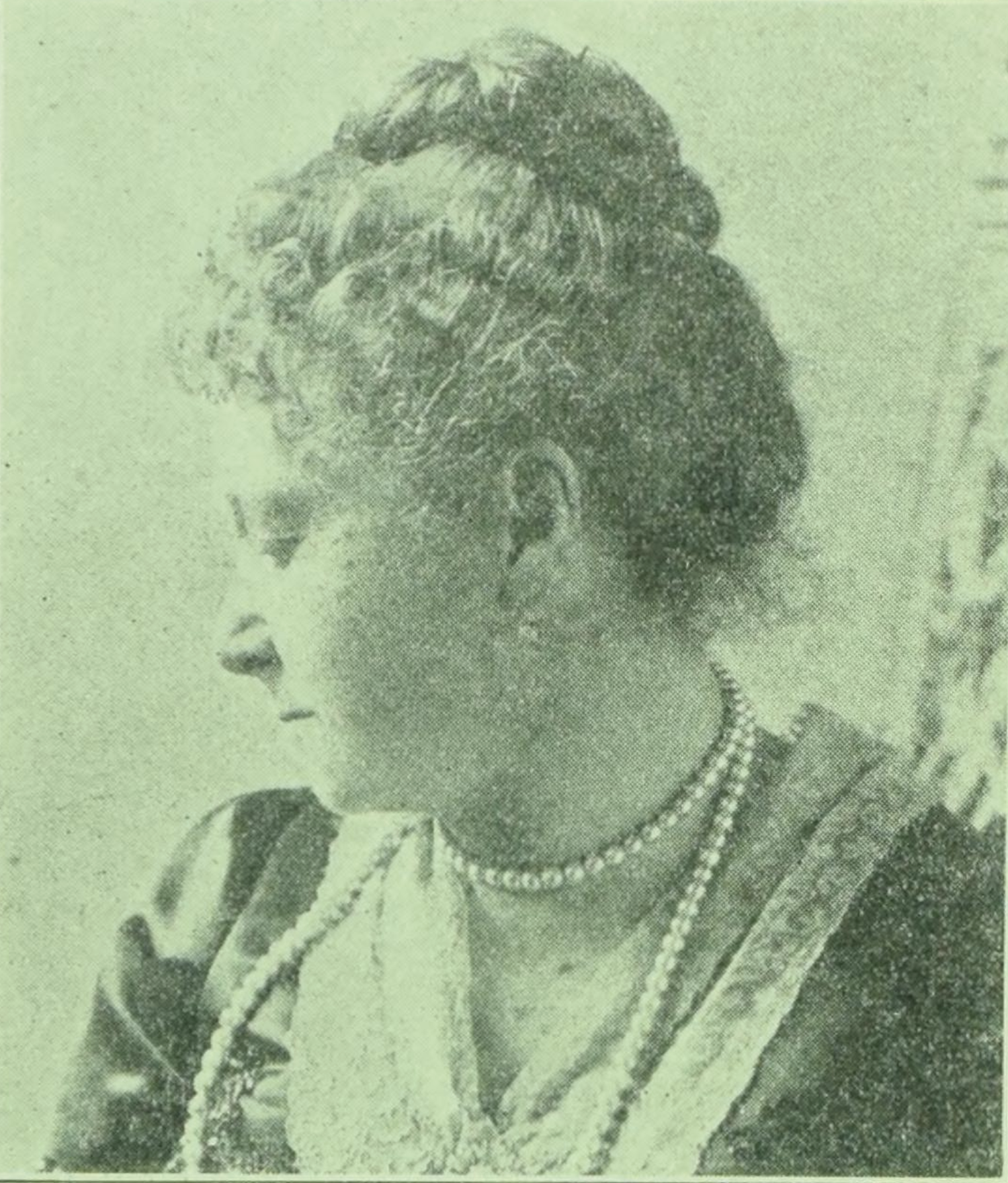
- Yorke in a 1930 publication.
- Born: Anne Henrietta de Rothschild; December 9, 1844; London, England
- Died: November 21, 1926 (aged 81); Netley, England
- Resting place: Willesden Jewish Cemetery
- Other name: Hon. Mrs. Eliot Yorke
- Occupations: Philanthropist; temperance reformer
- Organizations: President, Women's Total Abstinence Union; President, Nurses' National Total Abstinence League; President, United Kingdom Band of Hope
- Known for: Co-founder, Jewish Association for the Protection of Girls and Women)
- Notable work: The History and Literature of the Israelites
- Movement: Temperance movement in the United Kingdom
- Spouse: Eliot Constantine Yorke (m. 1873; died 1878)
- Parents: Sir Anthony de Rothschild, 1st Baronet (father); Louise Montefiore de Rothschild (mother)
- Relatives: Constance, Lady Battersea (sister); Cyril Flower, 1st Baron Battersea (brother-in-law); Mayer Amschel Rothschild (grandfather); Charles Yorke, 4th Earl of Hardwicke (father-in-law); Claude Montefiore (cousin); Alice Lucas (cousin)
- Family: Rothschild banking family of England

Annie Henrietta Yorke (née de Rothschild; also known as Hon. Mrs. Eliot Yorke; 1844–1926) was an English philanthropist and temperance reformer. She was one of the best-known social workers in South Hampshire, being especially interested in temperance and education. As president, vice-president, or patron, Yorke was probably associated with more organisations in Southampton than any other woman of her era.

== Early life and education ==
Anne (nickname, "Annie") Henrietta de Rothschild was born in London on December 9, 1844. Her parents were Sir Anthony, of the Rothschild banking family of England, and Louise Montefiore of Aston Clinton, Buckinghamshire. Louise's nephew was Claude Montefiore, president of University College, Southampton.

Yorke's early life was spent in Paris and from 1847, at 2, Grosvenor Place, London.

She was educated at home by private tutors.

== Career ==
Yorke was interested in politics and education, and in various philanthropic causes. She began her temperance activities in 1877, when she and her husband took the pledge of total abstinence. Her popularity in the temperance field was enhanced by her willingness to serve on the committees of small societies as well as those of greater prominence. For many years, she was an active participant in the numerous temperance conferences and bazaars held in various parts of the United Kingdom. Many of these gatherings she attended in her palatial yacht, Garland, which was often the scene of temperance teas and committee meetings.

She was on the Garland in Kiel Harbour on July 23, 1914, only hearing that war was declared upon her arrival at Bergen, Norway. The Garland was sold to the French government in 1916.

Yorke assisted in the formation of the Hampshire Band of Hope Union in 1894. She contributed generously to the support of the Travellers' Aid Society and the British Sailors' Society, and for several years, was president of the November Mission, Southampton, originally started by Canon Basil Wilberforce.

Prominent among the offices she held were the following: President of the Women's Total Abstinence Union (1900-03 and 1913-19); President of the Southampton Temperance Council; President of the Nurses' National Total Abstinence League, and President of the United Kingdom Band of Hope Union (1907-25). Of the latter, she served as its president when it had 417 unions, 30,144 societies, and a membership of 3,192,600.

She was also president of many smaller affiliated temperance societies.

Yorke served as vice-president of the National and London United Temperance Councils from 1899; vice-president of the National Temperance League, United Kingdom Alliance, and the National British Women’s Total Abstinence Union.

An honorary member of the Independent Order of Rechabites, she was also affiliated with the International Order of Good Templars, holding official positions in both organizations. Yorke was also a member of the Permanent International Committee of the International Congresses on Alcoholism.

Yorke's involvement with educational activities included classes at the Jews' Free School, membership in the Education Committee of Hampshire County Council, and for a period of time, being the only woman to serve as a member of the Council of University College, Southampton.

With her sister Constance, Lady Battersea, also a noted temperance advocate, Yorke wrote The History and Literature of the Israelites.

The two sisters were close companions. They both visited the East End of London frequently, and worked to improve the lives of the poor people amongst whom they went. They were largely instrumental in forming the Jewish Ladies' Society for Prevention and Rescue Work, later known as the Jewish Association for the Protection of Girls and Women.

Various reading and recreation rooms, including those at Butlocks and Old Netley, the White Rose Coffee House in Netley, and a refreshment room at Netley railway station were financed by her. She was also a keen supporter of the YMCA and the YWCA.

== Personal life ==
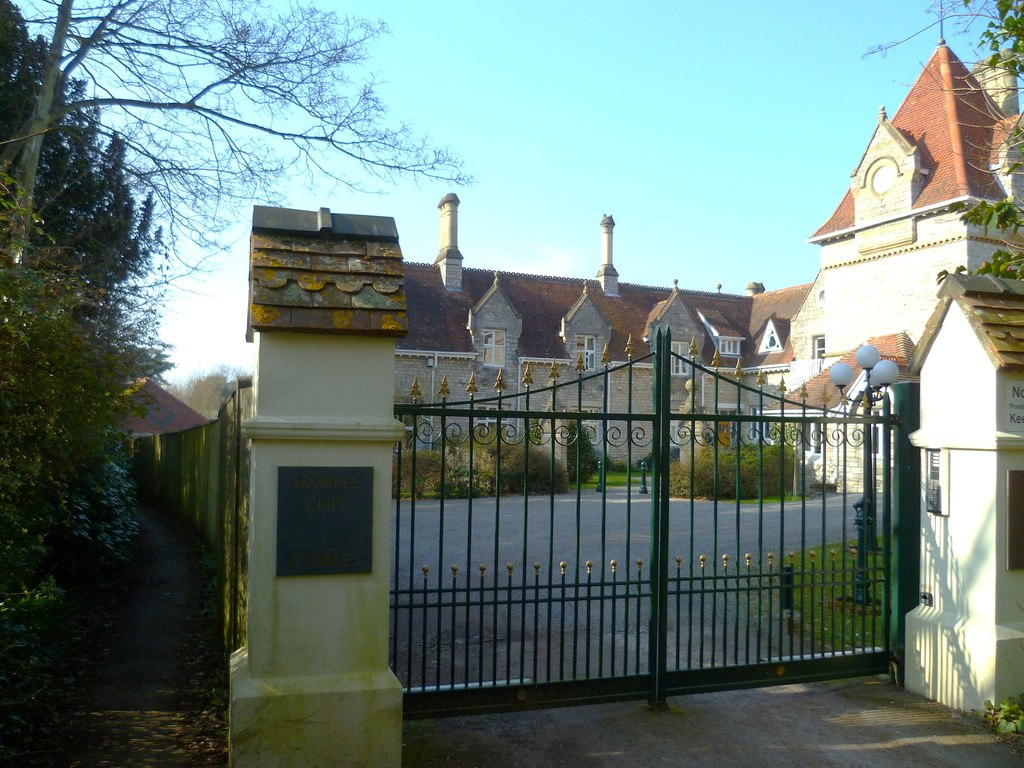
Hamble Cliff stables

"This engagement was contracted on both sides under very unusual circumstances. It was the first time that any member of our family had married outside her own faith, without entering her husband's community. It was also the first time that any English Peer's son had become connected with a Jewish family, where the wife remained true to her own persuasion." (Constance, Lady Battersea)

On Feb. 14, 1873, she married the Hon. Eliot Constantine Yorke (died 1878), son of the Charles Yorke, 4th Earl of Hardwicke and Member of Parliament for Cambridgeshire.

The couple was childless.

After the death of her husband, Yorke inherited the property of Hamble Cliff, Netley, Southampton, from her father-in-law and resided there for the greater part of each year until her death. The house, built by Sir Arthur Paget, though small, had many attributes of a larger one, and the grounds, shelving down to the waterside, were planted with trees, revealing glimpses of the distant shore and the busy in waterway. A wealth of roses bloomed in summer months. Yorke did a great deal in the interests of the estate, and took a great she threw in the garden. During World War I, she opened the grounds to the patients and staff at the Royal Victoria Military Hospital, British Red Cross, and Welsh Hospital. Large quantities of flowers and fruit grown on the estate were sent to the wards. Yorke took a keen interest in the Hospital, having an almost daily habit of visiting while staying at Hamble Cliff.

== Death ==
Annie Henrietta Yorke died at Netley, on November 21, 1926. Interment was at Willesden Jewish Cemetery.

== Selected works ==
- The history and literature of the Israelites according to the Old Testament and the Apocrypha (with Constance Flower), 1870 (volume 1) & (volume 2)
