= Edward Sayers =

Edward Sayers may refer to:

- Edward Sayers (RAF airman) (1897–1918), English World War I flying ace
- Edward Sayers (parasitologist) (1902–1985), New Zealand doctor
- Edward Sayers (politician) (1818–1909), New South Wales politician
- Eddie Sayers (born 1941), Northern Irish loyalist
