= Sir Anthony de Rothschild, 1st Baronet =

British financier (1810–1876)

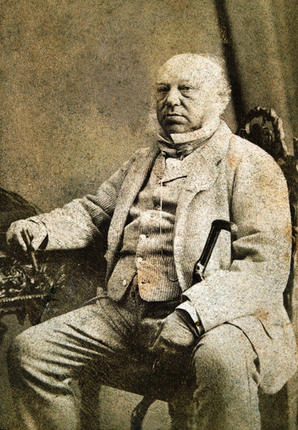
- Born: Anthony Nathan de Rothschild; 29 May 1810
- Died: 3 January 1876 (aged 65)
- Known for: Rothschild banking family of England
- Parent(s): Nathan Mayer Rothschild; Hanna Barent Cohen

Sir Anthony Nathan de Rothschild, 1st Baronet (29 May 1810 – 3 January 1876), was a British financier and a member of the prominent Rothschild banking family of England.

== Early life ==
Born in New Court, St Swithin's Lane, in the City of London, Anthony de Rothschild was the third child and second son of Nathan Mayer Rothschild and Hanna Barent Cohen. Multilingual, he studied at the University of Göttingen in Germany and the University of Strasbourg in France. He then went to work for N M Rothschild & Sons in London and was sent to train at de Rothschild Frères in Paris and M. A. Rothschild & Söhne in Frankfurt.

In 1840, Anthony Nathan de Rothschild married Louise Montefiore (1821–1910). She was a cousin, the daughter of Henriette Rothschild (1791–1866) and Abraham Montefiore. They had two daughters:

1. Constance (1843–1931), married Cyril Flower, 1st Baron Battersea (1843–1907)
2. Annie Henrietta (1844–1926), married the Hon. Eliot Constantine Yorke, (1843–1878) son of the 4th Earl of Hardwicke.

== Banking career ==
On his father's death in 1836, Anthony became a partner in the bank. Anthony's eldest brother Lionel de Rothschild worked at the bank but in time became more and more involved in politics. With younger brother Nathaniel settling permanently in Paris and acquiring the Château Brane Mouton vineyard, and youngest brother Mayer Amschel showing little interest in banking, a good portion of the responsibility for running the family's investment house fell on Anthony's shoulders. Working with brother Lionel and his cousin James in Paris, Anthony was a key figure in the 1845 creation and management of the Chemin de Fer du Nord, the family's rail transport business in France. Anthony Rothschild's involvement with the financing of European railways was extensive and included the Chemins de fer de Paris à Lyon et à la Méditerranée, the Imperial Lombardo Venetian and Central Italian Railway Company of which brother Lionel was a director as well as funding railroad construction in Brazil. In the 1840s he was involved with their investment in an ironworks in Mexico that supplied product for the building of that country's railway system. In addition, he was part of the 1852 negotiations for the lease whereby the Rothschilds took over the running of the Royal Mint Refinery in London and took charge of overseeing the operation.

== Private life ==
Like other members of the Rothschild family, Anthony was a dedicated collector of art and antiquities, making purchases from dealers across Europe. He acquired several pieces of exceedingly rare faience from France. He owned paintings such as "Portrait of a Man as the God Mars" by Peter Paul Rubens and "The Dispatch of the Messenger" by François Boucher.

In the early 1850s, Anthony de Rothschild acquired Aston Clinton House, an estate in Aston Clinton near Aylesbury in Buckinghamshire. He had been raised in London and although he maintained an opulent home at Grosvenor Place, he preferred country living where he liked to ride horses and participate in the hunt. At his stables he raised Thoroughbred racehorses, producing a number of successful winners on the track. A philanthropist, his support for various causes included an endowment of an infants school at Aston Clinton. He was also active in the London Jewish community, supporting the Jews' Free School and was the first president of the United Synagogue upon its formation in 1870.

== Honours ==
In 1847, Queen Victoria made him a baronet in the Baronetage of the United Kingdom. Since he had no male heirs, the title passed upon his death (by a special remainder) to his nephew Nathan Mayer Rothschild. The latter was subsequently created Baron Rothschild in 1885, with which title the baronetcy remains merged.

He was also a hereditary Freiherr (baron) of the Austrian Empire, and he became the Consul-General in London for the Emperor of Austria in 1858.

In addition, he was appointed as High Sheriff of Buckinghamshire in 1861.

== Later life ==
Anthony Nathan de Rothschild died in 1876 at Woolston, Hampshire, and was interred in the Willesden Jewish Cemetery. In his memory, his wife gifted Anthony Hall to the village of Aston Clinton, which is now a listed building.

Baronetage of the United Kingdom
New creation	Baronet of Grosvenor Place; 1847–1876	Succeeded by Nathan Rothschild
