= Edward Sayers (RAF airman) =

British World War I flying ace

Edward Harper Sayers
- Born: 1897; Merton, Surrey
- Died: 17 July 1918 (aged 20–21); Manston, Kent
- Burial place: Willesden New Cemetery, Middlesex, England; 51°32′42″N 0°14′40″W
- Military career
- Allegiance: United Kingdom
- Branch: British Army
- Rank: Sergeant
- Unit: No. 20 Squadron RFC
- Awards: Médaille militaire (France)

Sergeant Edward Harper Sayers was a British World War I flying ace credited with five aerial victories.

== Biography ==
Sayers was born in Merton, Surrey, the son of William Harper and Hannah Jane Sayers. In 1917 he was serving in the Royal Flying Corps' No. 20 Squadron as a 2nd Class Air Mechanic, flying in a F.E.2d two-seater fighter as an observer/gunner.

He gained his first aerial victory with pilot Second Lieutenant S. N. Pike on 7 April 1917, by driving down out of control an Albatros D.II over Tourcoing. Sayers and Lieutenant E. O. Perry sent an Albatros D.III down in flames over Becelaère on 24 April, but were later themselves shot down over Polygon Wood. He was paired with Lieutenant Donald Cunnell, for his next two victories, both D.IIIs shot down in flames, one over Comines on 2 May, and the other over Wervicq on 5 June. His fifth and final victory came on 8 June, with Second Lieutenant William Durrand in the pilot's seat, sending another D.III down in flames over Comines.

On 14 July 1917 AM2 Sayers was granted permission to wear the Médaille militaire awarded to him by the government of France.

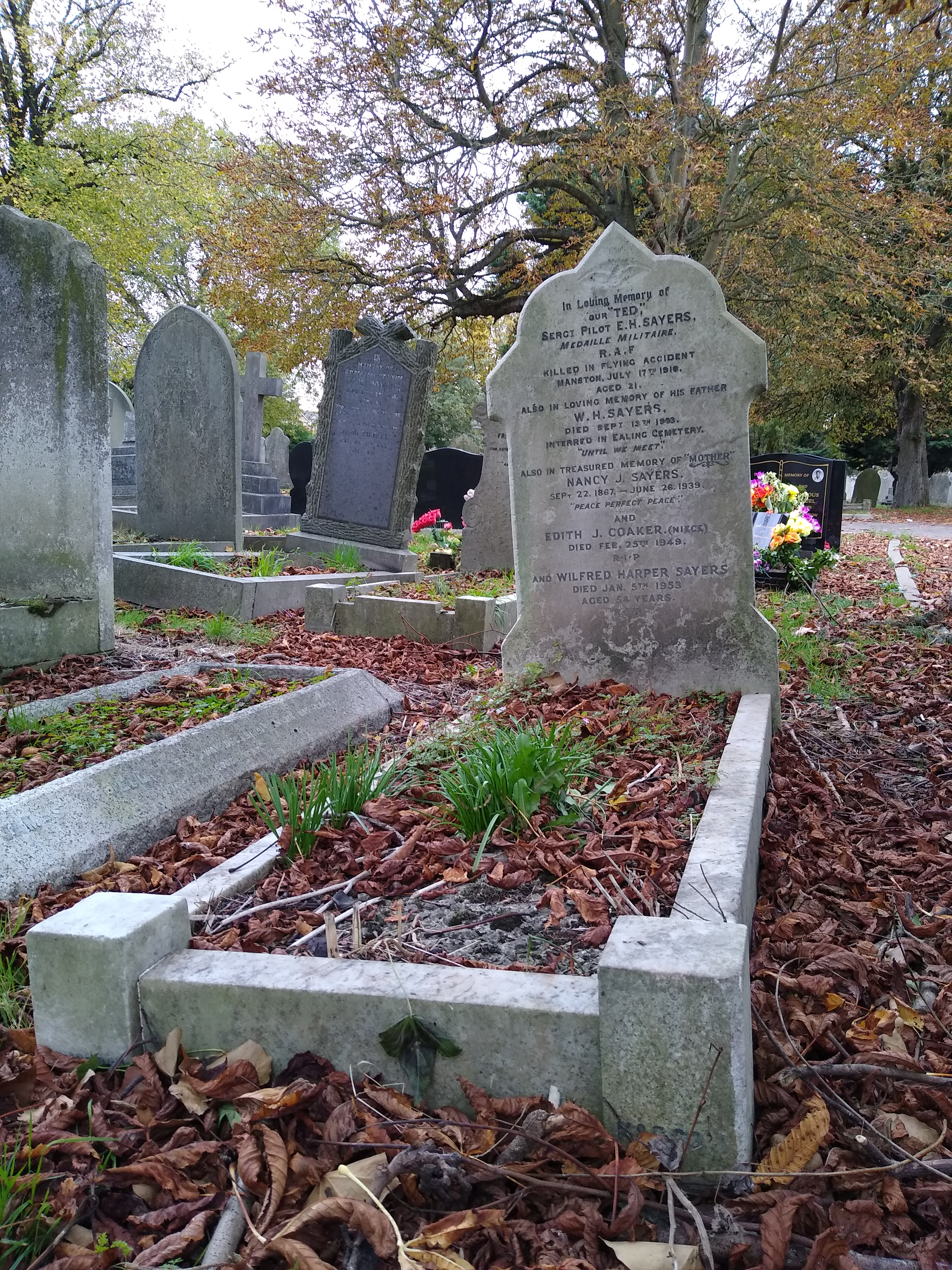
Sayers's grave in Willesden New Cemetery

Having been promoted to Sergeant, Sayers was killed in a flying accident at RFC Manston, Kent, on 17 July 1918. He is buried in the Willesden New Cemetery, Middlesex.
