= Otto Metzger =

German-British engineer and inventor

- Born: 24 November 1885; Nuremberg, Bavaria, Germany
- Died: 31 March 1961 (aged 75); Enfield, England

Otto Metzger was a German-British engineer, and inventor of an impact-extrusion process for forming seamless zinc and brass cans.

== Family ==
Otto Metzger was the son of Jewish parents: Ludwig Metzger (1852–1931) and Gretchen (Guldmann) (1864–1943). He grew up in Nuremberg, Germany, where he met his wife, Sophie (Josephthal) (1894–1998).

== First World War ==
Otto Metzger had previously served as a reserve officer in the Bavarian Engineers and so, at the outbreak of the First World War, he was immediately conscripted. He served in the Imperial German Army on the Western Front, and rose to the rank of lieutenant, and was awarded Iron Cross medals (1st and 2nd class).

== Engineering career in Germany ==
After his early schooling at the Neues Gymnasium in Nuremberg, he continued his studies at the Technische Hochschule (TH) in Munich, and obtained a Diplom-Ingenieur degree in mechanical engineering at the TH in Berlin-Charlottenburg.

Otto Metzger then spent several years travelling and gaining engineering experience both in Germany, and also in Austria, France, Britain, USA and in Mexico.

On his return to Nuremberg in 1912, he took a post with a local metals company, Schmidtmer & Co, first as an engineer, and then becoming a partner. After the First World War, he returned to his previous work; the company (then called Süddeutsche Metallindustrie) was taken over by Vereinigte Deutsche Metallwerke AG in 1926, and in 1930 became a subsidiary of the conglomerate Metallindustrie AG. He was to stay with that company in various engineering and management positions until 1938, during which time he developed and patented inventions related to impact-extrusion of zinc, brass and other non-ferrous metals. Typical products for these patents were seamless cans for zinc-carbon batteries, brass shell casings, and containers for foodstuff and for drinks.

== Nazi persecution and emigration ==
Starting in about 1933, the persecution of Jews in Nazi Germany intensified.

This reached a climax on 9 November 1938, when Jews were attacked in their homes and businesses during the night of Kristallnacht. Otto Metzger was returning from Britain, where he had just concluded a licensing agreement with a British company, Enfield Rolling Mills Ltd, to use his patented impact-extrusion technology. He was arrested by the Gestapo at the German border, on his way home to Nuremberg, and imprisoned in the Dachau concentration camp. Meanwhile his wife, having had their home and belongings invaded and smashed by Nazi stormtroopers and having spent the night wandering the streets of Nuremberg, waited in vain for Otto’s return.

Otto Metzger was released from Dachau on 15 December 1938, and returned home to Nuremberg. By late-February 1939, he had managed to obtain the necessary travel documents to leave Germany, and he and his wife left for Britain. Otto had been unable to obtain documents for his mother Gretchen (who by that time was aged 74); she remained in Nuremberg, and was transported by the Nazis to Theresienstadt concentration camp, where she died in 1943.

== Later life in Britain ==
On arrival in Britain in early 1939, Otto Metzger was immediately employed by Enfield Rolling Mills Ltd. He stayed with the company until his retirement in 1958, rising to the position of Managing Director.

During the Second World War, Otto Metzger was not interned as an enemy alien, as were most German immigrants; the British Government valued his expertise for the war effort.

Otto Metzger died of a heart attack in 1961.

== Memorialization ==
Otto and his wife Sophie are commemorated by adjacent rose bushes, planted in the Liberal Jewish Cemetery in London.

Two adjacent Stolpersteine, commemorating Otto and his wife Sophie, are laid in a Nuremberg street directly outside the apartment where they lived prior to fleeing Germany in 1939.
