= Asher Asher =

First Scottish Jew to enter medical profession (1837–1889)

Dr. Asher Asher

Asher Asher (16 February 1837 – 7 January 1889), born in Glasgow, was the first Scottish Jew to enter the medical profession. He published the book The Jewish Rite of Circumcision (1873). He died in London, England.

== Life ==
Asher Asher was educated at the Royal High School. He was a prominent member of the local Jewish congregation, as its Honorary Secretary. Then, he abandoned for studying medicine at the University of Edinburgh, graduating as Doctor of Medicine in 1856, as the first Jewish doctor of Scotland. He practiced at Glasgow and the nearby Bishopbriggs, a mining town.

In 1862, Asher Asher moved to London and became medical officer of the Jewish Board of Guardians, where he helped providing medical care for poor Jews, beside the founder, Dr. Canstatt. In 1866 was appointed secretary of the Great Synagogue. About this time the idea of a union of the various London synagogues had been put forward, chiefly by Lionel L. Cohen; and Asher devoted himself to the project with intense energy. In March, 1870, he became first secretary of the United Synagogue, contributing largely to the success of that institution — he wrote the introduction to the by-laws of the constituent synagogues, and practically founded its visitation committee. He retained this office until his death.

Owing to Asher's intimate relations with the Rothschilds, in his capacity of medical attendant, unofficial almoner, and personal friend, his advice was generally followed by them in communal matters. He was connected with a large number of institutions in the London community, and may be regarded as one of its organizers. Looking for better conditions for Jewish immigrants, Asher undertook journeys to Palestine, the United States, and Russia, in company of Samuel Montagu. Particularly, Asher was pledged about the Jewish communities of Eastern Europe. After the visit to Palestine he also wrote a report on the condition of affairs in Jerusalem, which effected much good. His sympathetic nature attracted to him most of the young men of ability of the rising generation, and upon them he exerted great influence. Asher wrote much for the Jewish press, chiefly under the pen-name "Aliquis".

== Legacy ==
- At the entrance of the Garnethill Synagogue, a plaque remembers Asher Asher.
- Since 1910, the University of Glasgow awards the Asher Asher Memorial Medal and Prize, annually for its Ear, Nose and Throat course.
- Asher Asher is buried in the Willesden United Synagogue Cemetery, at London.
