= Sam Mayo =

English music hall entertainer, pianist and songwriter

- Born: Samuel Cowan; 30 July 1881; London, England
- Died: 31 March 1938 (aged 56); London, England
- Burial place: Willesden Jewish Cemetery
- Other name: The Immobile One
- Occupation: Music hall singer

Sam Mayo (born Samuel Cowan; 30 July 1881 – 31 March 1938) was an English music hall entertainer, pianist and songwriter.

== Life ==
Born Samuel Cowan in London on 30 July 1881, he first worked in his father's second-hand shop while also collecting bets and singing in pubs and clubs with his brothers Ted and Maurice Cowan. He adopted the stage surname "Mayo" to distinguish himself from his brother Ted, who was also a professional entertainer.

Mayo married Zillah Flash (performing name: Stella Stanley) in Brighton on 13 August 1904. His early involvement in gambling stayed with him: heavy gambling caused him to be three times declared bankrupt.

== Career ==
Mayo developed a unique comic style as a music hall singer. Dressed in long overcoat or dressing gown, he sang deadpan at the piano in a lugubrious voice and with quirky humour. He became billed as "The Immobile One". Mayo mostly wrote his own songs, such as "The Old Tin Can", and provided other entertainers, such as Ernie Mayne, with material such as the song "Where Do Flies Go in the Winter Time?" He held the record for appearing at the greatest number of music halls in a single evening: nine performances at nine London venues on the evening of 21 January 1905.

== Death ==
He died of a heart attack whilst playing snooker at Ascot Club, in Charing Cross, on 31 March 1938, a week after attending the funeral of his son, who died of tuberculosis. He was buried at Willesden Jewish Cemetery. The funeral was attended by Will Fyffe and a few other notable figures in music hall.

== Trivia ==
The noted writer Katherine Mansfield quoted Mayo's lyrics in a letter dated 1 November 1920.
