= Alexandra Wright =

English rabbi

- Occupation: Rabbi
- Known for: British Liberal rabbi

Alexandra Wright is a British Liberal rabbi who was appointed as the first female senior rabbi in England in 2004, as Rabbi of the Liberal Jewish Synagogue in St John's Wood, London. She is President of Liberal Judaism in the United Kingdom.

Wright became the seventh woman to be ordained as a rabbi in the United Kingdom in 1986; she was ordained at Leo Baeck College, and has taught classical Hebrew there. She served as Associate Rabbi at the Liberal Jewish Synagogue from 1986 until 1989. She then served as Rabbi at Radlett and Bushey Reform Synagogue in Hertfordshire from 1989 until 2003.

In 2010 she wrote an open letter to Rowan Williams, then the Archbishop of Canterbury, asking him to ordain women as bishops.

She has contributed to two anthologies of women rabbis' essays and liturgies – Hear our Voice and Taking up the Timbrel. She is also the only woman whose sermon has been included in Rabbi Professor Marc Saperstein's Jewish Preaching in Times of War.

== Personal life ==
She has two children, Gabrielle and Benedict.
