= Jewish Association for the Protection of Girls and Women =

Anti-prostitution activist organisation (1885–1947)

- Abbreviation: JAPGW
- Predecessor: Jewish Ladies' Society for Preventive and Rescue Work
- Formation: 1885
- Founders: Annie Henrietta Yorke; Constance Flower; Claude Montefiore; Arthur Moro; Baroness Emma Louise Rothschild; Rabbi Simeon Singer
- Founded at: London, England
- Dissolved: 1947; 79 years ago
- Purpose: Combat of human trafficking in Eastern European Jewish adult and adolescent women

The Jewish Association for the Protection of Girls and Women (JAPGW), founded in 1885 as the Jewish Ladies' Society for Preventive and Rescue Work, was a British Jewish organization established by women for the purpose of combatting trafficking in Eastern European Jewish adult and adolescent women. As its activities progressed, men as well joined the association. The JAPGW led an international struggle against trafficking in women for their exploitation in prostitution, provided aid to the victims and saw to their vocational rehabilitation. The association ceased its activities in 1947, upon the end of World War II.

== 19th-century Jewish demography and the trafficking of Jewish women ==
The Jewish population of Eastern Europe increased rapidly during the 19th century. In 1800, some 1.25 million Jews lived in Russia, Poland, Romania and Galicia, and by 1900 that number grew to 6.2 million. This rapid growth led to significant demographic changes and to social instability. Economic opportunities lagged behind the needs of the growing population, and shortages caused a major wave of emigration. Between 1880–1914, 6.2 million Jews exited through international borders. They left Eastern and Central Europe for the United States with the objective of improving their lives. Many of them didn't reach their initially intended destination, stopping instead in countries in South America or Western Europe, due to the opportunities and expectations for success there. Other emigrants had their change of destination forced upon them by circumstances. To this category primarily belong Jewish women, among them adults and adolescents, some of them newly married, who were enticed by various means to engage in the sex trade that emerged alongside the migration.

The Jewish community in London before 1880 consisted mainly of Sephardic and Central European Jews of the upper socioeconomic classes. Following the large influx of immigration from Eastern Europe, the size and composition of the Jewish community in the UK changed. During the years 1880–1914, London's Jewish population grew from 40,000 to 200,000. The majority of the Jews who arrived in London from the Russian Empire concentrated in the East End. As Eastern Europeans, they were considerably different in appearance and customs from the veteran Jewish population of London. The neighborhood of the newcomers was marked by conditions of poverty, overcrowding, and poor sanitation. These conditions brought with them crime, among which was white slavery: a novel international phenomenon of men and women who engaged in organized sex commerce, including Jewish women. It is difficult to estimate the number of women who were traded in this manner, but it was an international activity whose presence was manifest and sowed fear among world Jewry: they suspected that the impoverished Eastern European emigrants associated with crime would identify with them and spark antisemitism.

== 1885–1896: Jewish Ladies Association for Preventive and Rescue Work ==
=== Foundation ===
Constance Rothschild, Lady Battersea, a British countess by marriage, was involved in welfare and educational activities throughout the United Kingdom on behalf of immigrants in general, and Jewish immigrants in particular. On an 1885 visit to London, she was exposed to the problems of Jewish prostitution in that city. She learned that a number of shelters existed for at-risk women which were sponsored by the church, missions or other Christian women's organizations, but not a single Jewish shelter able to take in Jewish women who wanted to break free from prostitution and re-enter normative Jewish society. In those years, mainstream Anglo-Jewish society considered women who engaged in prostitution as degenerate and outcasts, and therefore the Jewish community was not interested in accepting those women back into it. The countess realized that there were Jewish women who needed such a shelter, and therefore concluded that it was necessary to establish such an organization for them.

Lady Battersea approached Claude Montefiore and Arthur Moro (Note: Arthur Moro, a cousin of Lady Constance Battersea, was an attorney by profession who served as an advocate for the JAPGW and represented women and girls in their court trials on matters of human trafficking.) (both her cousins), and Baroness Emma Louisa von Rothschild, as well as their friend Rabbi Simeon Singer. Together with Constance's sister, Annie Henrietta Yorke, they founded The Jewish Ladies Association for Preventive and Rescue Work. Lady Battersea served as the Head Secretary and Lady Rothschild was appointed President, while the men served as the "Gentlemen's Committee," an auxiliary council accompanying the association. As with other women's welfare associations of that period in Great Britain, the founders were from the upper class and performed their duties on a voluntary basis. Their objective was to rescue women who had strayed from their path, to rehabilitate them for reintegration into mainstream society, and effectively to break them out of the cycle of prostitution.

=== Operations ===
The Association's leadership understood from the outset that any rescue activity, even well-organized, would be unable to provide a solution to the root of the phenomenon. Rather, an approach towards early identification of at-risk women would serve to prevent their temptation and falling into the hands of the so-called "white slavers". The organizers discovered that a large proportion of the recruitment activity took place at the ports of entry when unaccompanied women and girls disembarked alone, confused and helpless, unaware of possible dangers awaiting them. There they might be met by agents of procurers offering to accompany them to the new arrival's intended destination, or with an offer of easy and profitable work to assure a favorable start in their new country. Upon identifying the problem, the women of the Association engaged Mr. Sternheim (Note: Mr. Sternheim, whose wife was the director of the Association's Charcroft House residence, worked for many years as a port agent.) to represent the JAPGW at the ports. (Note: The Association's women's shelter was called Charcroft House and was managed by Mrs. Harris.) His task was to identify young women who traveled alone and offer them the aid of the JAPGW. Thus they hoped to reduce the exposure of innocent young women to engage in prostitution.

The Association rented a small building to serve as a shelter accommodating single mothers with one child. Soon they recognized the need for vocational training for sheltered women to find dignified employment. The first occupations were as laundresses and domestic servants, and lessons included prayer. (Note: The shelter housemothers instructed their charges in prayer as a regular part of their daily program. This stemmed from a world view that the belief in God would strengthen the protegees and help them commit to a moral path.)

== 1896–1947: Jewish Association for the Protection of Girls and Women ==
In 1896, the organization renamed itself to the Jewish Association for the Protection of Girls and Women. It disbanded in 1947.
