= Lewis Joel =

Lewis Joel (1824 – February 28, 1899) was a British Jewish diplomat who mainly served in Latin America.

== Life ==
Joel was born in 1824 in Dublin, United Kingdom of Great Britain and Ireland. He was educated in Bristol.

In 1850, he was found guilty of accepting a forged £1,000 bill of exchange to defraud John Marcus Clements. He then spent over a year in prison before receiving a royal pardon after it was revealed there was no forgery and it was Clements' signature. In 1858, he was appointed the United States Consul to Cobija, Bolivia.

In 1861, Joel was appointed Unpaid British Vice-Consul at Cobija. He also served as the acting French Consul in the city from 1863 to 1866, and for many years he was Post Office Agent there. In 1866, he was named Paid Vice-Consul And Post Office Agent at Ciudad Bolívar, Venezuela. In 1867, he was briefly Acting Chargé d'affaires in Caracas, Venezuela. From 1868 to 1869, he was Commissioner of a Mixed British and Venezuelan Commission at Caracas for the Settlement of British Claims against the Government of Venezuela. In 1869, he was again Acting Chargé d'affaires and Consul-General at Caracas. In 1870, he was promoted to Consul at Rosario. In 1877, he was transferred to Brindisi, Italy. In 1880, he was appointed Consul at Savannah, Georgia. In 1883, he became Consul at Cadiz, Spain.

In 1888, Joel was promoted to Consul-General at Panama, Columbia. In 1891, he was transferred to Valparaiso, Chile. He was temporarily in charge of the British Legation in Santiago from October 1892 to February 1893 and from January to February 1894. He retired with a pension on January 1894. In September 1894, he was appointed British member of a Tribunal of Arbitration between Great Britain and Chile regarding the settlement of claims that arose out of the Chilean Civil War of 1891. He retired in 1895. He also wrote A Consul's Manual in 1879.

Joel died at St Leonards-on-Sea. on February 28, 1899. He was buried in Willesden Jewish Cemetery.
