= William Durrand Jr. =

Canadian flying ace

- Born: 4 May 1885; Wick, Caithness, Scotland
- Died: 12 October 1939 (aged 54); Kenmore, New York, U.S.
- Military career
- Allegiance: Canada; United Kingdom
- Branch: Canadian Expeditionary Force; Royal Flying Corps
- Service years: 1916–1919
- Rank: Lieutenant
- Unit: No. 20 Squadron RFC
- Awards: Military Cross

Lieutenant William Durrand Jr. (4 May 1885 – 12 October 1939) was a Canadian flying ace from World War I. He was credited with eight aerial victories.

== Infantry service ==
Durrand enlisted in the Canadian military on 11 March 1916. On 30 August 1916, Sergeant William Durrand of the 66th Battalion of the Canadian Expeditionary Force was commissioned a Temporary Second Lieutenant with the Royal Flying Corps.

== Aerial service ==
On 1 March 1917 appointed flying officer while still temporary second lieutenant. He was then assigned to No. 20 Squadron RFC to pilot a Royal Aircraft Factory FE.2d. He scored his first victory on 8 June 1917, with Edward Sayers manning the observer's guns. Durrand scored three more wins while flying a FE.2, with number four coming on 21 September. He then upgraded to another two-seater fighter, the Bristol F.2, and scored again almost immediately, on the 27th, with observer William Benger as his gunner. His next victory came on the first day he flew as Temporary Captain and Flight Commander on 17 October 1917. Durrand scored twice more with the Bristol, ending his victory string on 8 November 1917. His final tally was two enemy planes driven down out of control, and six destroyed (including one shared with Reginald Makepeace).

== Postwar ==
He was transferred to the Royal Air Force unemployed list on 18 May 1919.

== Awards ==
Awarded the Military Cross on 17 December 1917.
