= Catherine Gasquoine Hartley =

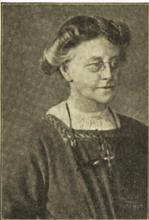
- Portrait photo from The Bookman (1914)
- Born: 1860s Antananarivo, Merina Kingdom
- Died: 9 June 1928; Guildford, England, United Kingdom
- Spouse: Walter M. Gallichan

C. Gasquoine Hartley or Catherine Gasquoine Hartley or Mrs Walter Gallican (1866/7–1928) was a writer and art historian with a particular expertise on Spanish art. Latterly she wrote about polygamy, motherhood and sex education.

== Life ==
Hartley was born in 1866 or 1867 in Antananarivo in the Merina Kingdom of Madagascar to Reverend Richard Griffiths Hartley and his wife Catherine (née Gasquoine), both from Manchester. Her parents had served as missionaries in Mauritius before they went to Madagascar. Her father left them with a poor financial position when he died in 1870 after the family had returned to Hampshire. Hartley inherited her father's passion for teaching, and she first worked as a teacher in Southport, where she was brought up. She rose to be the headteacher at Babington House, Eltham, Kent in 1894. She left this post to write sometime around 1903. She published Life: the Modeller which was a novel set against her knowledge of art, although its history attracted only minor interest. A second novel, The Weaver's Shuttle, appeared in 1905.

Hartley became the second wife of the journalist and writer Walter M. Gallichan on 9 May 1901. He had written under the name Geoffrey Mortimer. After their marriage her husband wrote under his own name and Hartley assigned her work to "C. Gasquoine Hartley (Mrs Walter Gallichan)", both writing about their leisurely lifestyle. They had a house in Youlgreave in Derbyshire where they put together The Story of Seville which was published as part of The Medieval Towns series of guides. The illustrations for the book were made by Hartley's sister, Elizabeth.

In 1904, she published Pictures in the Tate Gallery. In the same year her husband published Fishing and Travel in Spain; this was matched by Hartley's book A Record of Spanish Painting which revealed her expertise in Spanish art. She created some controversy concerning her lack of attribution in a case pursued by Edward S. Dodgeson. Her husband joined in the correspondence in 1907 which itemised points of fact and attribution that Dodgson felt that Hartley had overlooked and this dispute was published by The Academy magazine. During this time she was writing articles about contemporary artists such as the British painter John Collier for The New Age.

Hartley continued to write books with Albert Calvert on the Spanish Prado Museum and the Spanish painters Velázquez and El Greco. Their books were favourably reviewed at home, in Spain and the United States. In 1910, she took an interest in Galicia which began with a trip organised by the British International Association of Journalists. Her advocacy for the region saw her publish Spain Revisited: a Summer Holiday in Galicia in 1911 (which was translated into Galician in 1999). Her 1912 publication The Story of Santiago de Compostela was much more controversial. Nine years after it was published she and its publisher were successfully sued for plagiarism by Annette Meakin. Meakin showed that Hartley's book was too similar to her book Galicia, the Switzerland of Spain. As part of the settlement Hartley's book was removed from libraries. In 1913, she published her final book on Spain, The Cathedrals of Southern Spain.

Hartley's husband had published Modern Woman and How to Manage Her in 1909 and he continued to publish controversial titles about women, polygamy and sex education. Before they divorced in 1915, Hartley adopted a son, Leslie, who had been born in 1904. Single again, she investigated new areas in her writing where she investigated social issues including motherhood and sex. In 1916 she wrote Children of the Empire with her new husband, the Zionist journalist Arthur Daniel Lewis. Her latter works were The Position of Women in primitive society, Motherhood and the Relationships of the Sexes, Woman's Wild Oats: Essays on the Re-fixing of Moral Standards, Divorce (Today and Tomorrow), Mind of the Naughty Child and latterly Women, Children, Love and Marriage in 1924.

She was hit by a van on 7 June 1928 and died two days later. Hartley was buried in the Willesden Jewish Cemetery next to her second husband.

== Selected works ==
- Pictures in the Tate Gallery, 1904
- The Story of Seville (with Gallichan)
- A Record of Spanish Painting, 1904
- The Weaver's Shuttle, 1905
- Spain Revisited: a Summer Holiday in Galicia, 1911
- The Story of Santiago de Compostela, 1912 (plagiarist)
- The Cathedrals of Southern Spain, 1913
- Children of the Empire (with Lewis)
- The Position of Women in Primitive Society, 1914
- Motherhood and the Relationships of the Sexes, 1917
- Woman's Wild Oats: Essays on the Re-fixing of Moral Standards, 1919
- Things seen in Spain, 1921
- Divorce (Today and Tomorrow), 1921
- Mind of the Naughty Child, 1923
- Women, Children, Love and Marriage, 1924
