= Aluminium bottle =

Bottle made entirely of aluminium

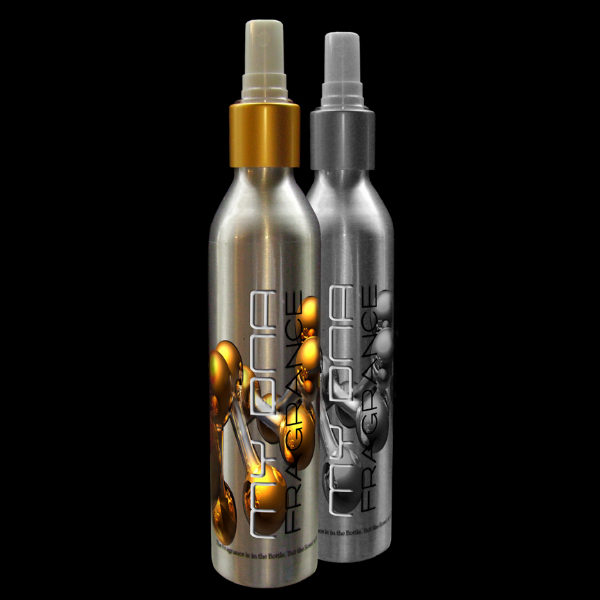
Aluminium spray bottle

An aluminium bottle, also sometimes called a bottlecan, is a bottle made of aluminium.

== History and overview ==
Aluminium bottles are made through an impact extrusion process. The aluminium bottle was introduced to the North American beverage market in the fall of 2001, as an alternative to plastic bottles by Coca-Cola under the Powerade brand (Psych and Raize) at the National Association of Convenience Stores Show.

== "Cooler longer" claim ==
A study conducted by engineering science students at Loyola College in Maryland suggested that the liquid content of aluminium bottles stays slightly colder than the liquid content of glass bottles, when allowed to warm at room temperature. These results were not corroborated by a 2005 study at Bucknell University, which found that “The fluid in the aluminium bottle cools much faster than the glass bottle, and once removed from a cold source and exposed to room temperature, the glass bottle remained cooler longer than the aluminium bottle.”

== See also ==
- Aluminium recycling
- Bottle recycling
- List of bottle types, brands and companies
