= The history and literature of the Israelites according to the Old Testament and the Apocrypha =

First edition, Volume 1
- Author: Constance Flower; Annie Henrietta Yorke
- Language: English
- Subject: Israelites
- Genre: Old Testament
- Published: December 12, 1870
- Publisher: Longman
- Publication place: England

1870, vol. 2

The history and literature of the Israelites according to the Old Testament and the Apocrypha was a two-volume work by Rothschild sisters Constance Flower and Annie Henrietta Yorke. It was published in London on December 12, 1870.

The work was a popular introduction to the Old Testament, probably designed for the use of Jews and written from the point of view of Reform Judaism.

== Contents ==
- Volume 1: The Historical Books, with a Map of Palestine, and a Map shewing the Journeys of the Hebrews in the Desert
- Volume 2: The Prophetic and Poetical Writings

== Publication ==
A second edition was published February 23, 1871.

Another edition, revised, was published in 1873. It was abridged in one volume and included two maps.

== Overview ==
The first part of this work, faithfully following the Biblical records, attempts a continuous narrative of the history of the Hebrews from the earliest times to the conclusion of the Maccabean wars. Its chief object is so to familiarize young readers with Bible history as to enable them to consult more elaborate or critical works. A map of Palestine contains the places mentioned in the volume, and another map shows the stations touched by the Israelites in their wanderings from Egypt to Canaan. The second part is devoted to the prophetic and poetical writings of the Old Testament. It endeavours to give information on the chronology and authorship of the different books, on the occasions by which they were called forth, and the objects they were designed to serve, being intended especially for the young,. Moreover, it gives copious extracts from the prophets and poets themselves, in order to afford a clearer understanding of the style and character of the various writers. The extracts are given in a translation based upon the authorised English version, but revised after the original text. A short analysis of the Apocryphal books of Ecclesiasticus and The Wisdom of Solomon concludes the volume.

== Review ==
In a review by The Times (1872), it was noted that the authors designed the work to meet the want of young persons and busy people by presenting the Bible history in a continuous narrative, with such explanations as a historian would ordinarily offer of the events he was describing. They endeavoured to combine the historical and literary materials afforded by the Bible into a narrative sketch to be harmonious and complete in itself. It was their desire to facilitate a familiar acquaintance with the facts and passages of the Holy Scriptures, and so to help readers to find deeper interest in the Bible itself, and to arouse in them a greater wish to study the authors who gave their expositions of the Holy Text. This design was executed judiciously, and with literary skill. Though they offered their book for the special perusal of the young, it could be read by much more mature readers. The book offered to present a complete view of Jewish history and literature, both canonical and uncanonical, from the earliest times to the date of Herod the Great, and of presenting it in a form in which it would be acceptable everywhere. The authors seemed particularly happy in the manner in which they illustrated the familiar narratives by offering touches of reality from Eastern life and customs. The authors quoted freely from the Scripture narrative itself, revising the translation where it seemed necessary. The interspersed translations afford, for the most part, useful interpretations of obscure passages.

The Christian Observer (February 1871) gave a long review.
