= Walter M. Gallichan =

British writer and journalist

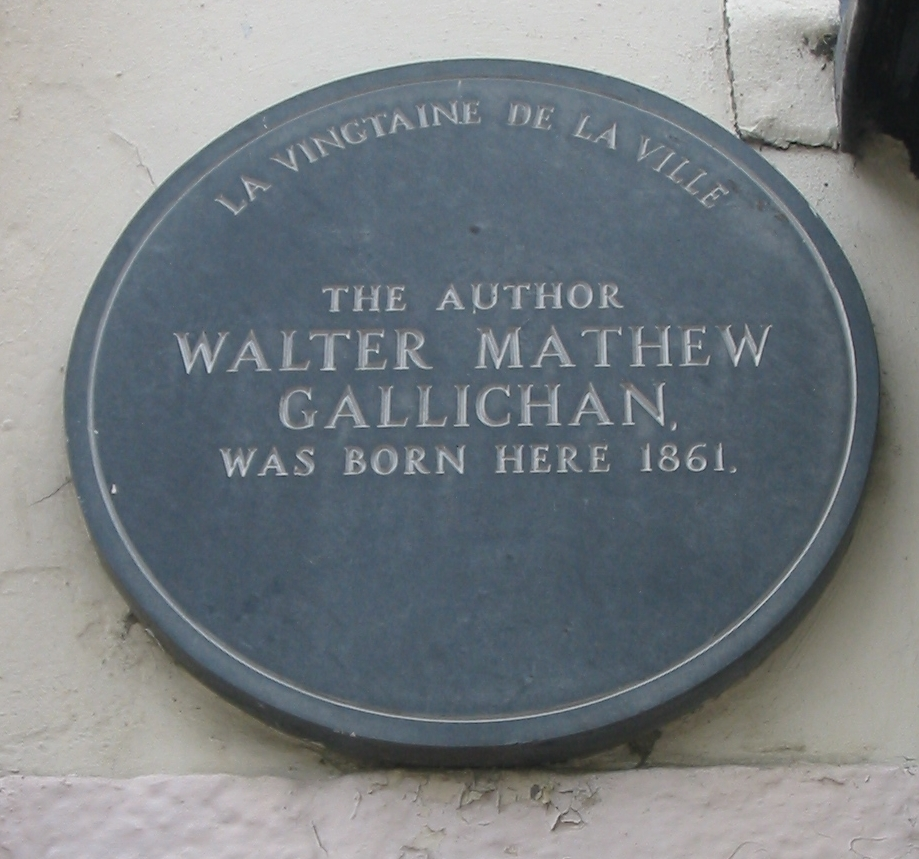
- Plaque on Walter M. Gallichan's birthplace in the Royal Square, Vingtaine de la Ville
- Born: Walter Matthew Gallichan; 1861; St Helier, Jersey
- Died: 27 November 1946; Weston-super-Mare, Somerset, England
- Occupations: Writer, journalist
- Spouse(s): Ada Elizabeth White, Catherine Gasquoine Hartley, Norah Kathleen Finberg
- Relatives: John Gallichan (father), Elizabeth White (mother)

Walter Matthew Gallichan (1861 – 27 November 1946) was a British writer and journalist.

== Personal life ==
Walter Matthew Gallichan was born in St. Helier, Jersey, the son of John Gallichan, an antiques dealer, and his wife, Elizabeth, a music teacher. After his family moved to Reading, Berkshire, he was educated there privately.

Gallichan married multiple times. He was married firstly in 1889 to Ada Elizabeth White, daughter of Henry White the librarian of the Royal Society until her death in 1895. In March 1901 he was recorded in the Welsh census as being married to a "Mary Gallichan", but six weeks later he is recorded as marrying the author and art historian Catherine Gasquoine Hartley at Chelsea Registry Office in London. Hartley and Gallichan divorced in 1915. In February 1916 he married for the final time, again in London, to divorcee Norah Kathleen Finberg (née Mutch). After his divorce Gallichan's marriage to Hartley was glossed over in his Who's Who entry, which only listed his marriages to White and Mutch, and this version of his marital situation was also followed later by The Times in his obituary.

In 1934 Gallichan was awarded a Civil List pension.

He died on 27 November 1946 in Weston-super-Mare, Somerset.

== Career ==
Gallichan made his name as a journalist, being one of the earliest members of the staff of the Daily Mail, and was later a pioneer in sex education in Britain.

Gallichan's earliest works were released under the pseudonym Geoffrey Mortimer, including a number of novels and some essays on sex and morality. Several of his early non-fiction works were published by the so-called University Press of Watford. This controversial publisher was known for publishing contentious material, and had been prosecuted for obscenity after its 1897 publication of Havelock Ellis's Sexual Inversion.

His works covered a very wide variety of subjects, from outdoor pursuits and ornithology to eugenics and criticism of the women's movement. His work on outdoor pursuits were particularly concerned with his personal interests in angling and bird-watching in Britain and abroad.

His contemporary political works included his 1909 objection to the women's movement, entitled Modern Woman and How to Manage Her, and his 1929 work on eugenics, The Sterilization of the Unfit. In addition to these works, however, he also wrote extensively on sex education and marriage during the 1920s, publishing A Text-Book of Sex Education for Parents and Teachers in 1919, Youth and Maidenhood, or, Sex Knowledge for Young People in 1920, and later works like Sexual Apathy and Coldness in Women (1927) and The Poison of Prudery (1929). His later works were released with titles that were intentionally designed to seek controversy.

Although he released five novels over his lifetime these received little critical notice and he is mostly remembered for his journalism and his controversial essays.

=== Works ===
Fiction

- (1895). Like Stars That Fall, Bertram Dobell [as Geoffrey Mortimer].
- (1895). Tales from the Western Moors, Gibbings and Company [as Geoffrey Mortimer].
- (1905). The Conflict Of Owen Prytherch, Watts & Co.
- (1907). A Soul From The Pit, David Nutt.
- (1924). The Veil And The Vision, Health Promotion Ltd.

Non-fiction

- (1897). The Blight of Respectability, The University Press [as Geoffrey Mortimer].
- (1898). Chapters on Human Love, The University Press [as Geoffrey Mortimer].
- (1902). The New Morality, Watts & Co [as Geoffrey Mortimer].
- (1903). Fishing in Wales, F. E. Robinson & Co [as Geoffrey Mortimer].
- (1903). The Story of Seville, J. M. Dent & Co.
- (1904). Fishing and Travel in Spain, F. E. Robinson & Co.
- (1904). Practical Hints on Angling, in Rivers, Lakes, And Sea, C. Arthur Pearson.
- (1905). Fishing in Derbyshire And Around, F. E. Robinson & Co.
- (1907). The Complete Fisherman, T. Werner Laurie Ltd.
- (1908). The Trout Waters of England, T. N. Foulis.
- (1909). Modern Woman and How to Manage Her, T. Werner Laurie Ltd.
- (1910). Old Continental Towns, T. Werner Laurie Ltd.
- (1911). Where Trout Abound, Everett.
- (1914). British Birds, Their Nests and Eggs, and How to Name Them, Holden and Hardingham, Limited
- (1914). Women Under Polygamy, Holden & Hardingham.
- (1915). The Art of Courtship and Marriage; or, How To Love, Health Promotion, Ltd.
- (1916). The Religion of Kindness, Watts & Co.
- (1916). Fishing Waters & Quarters in Wales, Heath Cranton Ltd.
- (1916). The Great Unmarried, T. Werner Laurie Ltd.
- (1917). Life Enjoyable, Grafton & Co.
- (1917). The Psychology of Marriage, T. Werner Laurie, Ltd.
- (1918). The Soldiers' English And French Conversation Book, J. B. Lippincott Company.
- (1919). A Textbook of Sex Education for Parents And Teachers, T. Werner Laurie Ltd. [Small, Maynard & Company, 1921].
- (1919). Letters to a Young Man On Love and Health, T. Werner Laurie Ltd.
- (1920). The Critical Age Of Woman, Health Promotion, Ltd.
- (1920). Youth And Maidenhood, Health Promotion, Ltd.
- (1921). Our Hidden Selves, Athletic Publications.
- (1921). Cheshire, Methuen & Co.
- (1925). Youth's Secret Conflict,
- (1926). The Happy Fisherman, Heath Cranton Limited.
- (1926). Pitfalls of Marriage, George H. Wales.
- (1927). North Wales, its Mountains, Glens, Castles, and Holiday Haunts, Midland and Scottish Railway Co.
- (1927). Sexual Apathy and Coldness in Women, The Stratford Company.
- (1929). The Sterilization of The Unfit, T. Werner Laurie Ltd.
- (1929). The Poison of Prudery, T. Werner Laurie, Ltd.
- (1929). Youthful Old Age, The Macmillan Company.
- (1929). The Evolution, Theory, Physiology, Psychology and Ideal Practice of Human Love, Walden Publications.
- (1939). The Soldiers' War Slang Dictionary, T. Werner Laurie Ltd.
- (1947). The Art of Courtship and Marriage, George H. Wales.

Miscellany

- (1907). "The Pleasures of Coarse-Fishing." In British Country Life in Spring and Summer, Edward Thomas (ed), Hodder & Stoughton.
- (1909). "Charles the Correct." In The Press Album, John Murray.
- (1919). "Prudery and the Child," Social Hygiene, Vol. V.
