= Impact extrusion =

Manufacturing process wherein products are extruded via a pin and die arrangement

Impact extrusion is a manufacturing process similar to extrusion and drawing by which products are made with a metal slug. The slug is pressed at a high velocity with extreme force into a die or mold by a punch.

== Process ==
The punch is attached to a mechanical or hydraulic press. These machines reciprocate in a cycle 20 to 60 times per minute. A cold slug is placed below the punch and over the die. The punch makes contact with the slug forcing it around the circumference of the punch and into the die. The metal slug deforms to fit the punch on the inside and the die on the outside. Lubricants are added to aid the machine for an easier punch-out. It only takes one impact for the finished shape to form from the slug. Once the slug has been contoured to the desired shape, a counter-punch ejector removes the work piece from within the die.

== Some Characteristics of the Process ==
The wall thickness of the work piece is directly correlated with the clearance between the punch and die.

The thinner the wall of the work piece the tighter its tolerances are.

The end product has a better surface finish than the starting piece and the grain of the material is reformed to its new shape. This adds strength to the new form compared to cutting into the grain like in a machining process.

== Effects on Work Material Properties ==
After going through this process the properties of the material used are altered. Its hardness and yield strength are increased, cross-sectional area is decreased, some residual surface stresses will be present and micro cracks may appear. Physical and chemical properties are only influenced slightly.

== Die Style ==
Four major types of dies (tools) can be used. They are: forward, backward/reverse, combined, and hydrostatic extrusion. Forward extrusion pushes the slug into the die. Backward/reverse extrusion pushes the slug around the punch. Combined extrusion forces the slug both into the die and around the punch. Hydrostatic extrusion is used on brittle materials (i.e. molybdenum, beryllium, and tungsten) by applying pressure gradually to force the brittle material through the die. This is generally accomplished by the same method as forward extrusion.

== Typical Workpiece Materials ==
Typical materials for this process are: aluminium, brass, tin, mild steel, stainless steel, magnesium, titanium, and zinc.

== Tool Materials ==
Typical tool steels used in extruding aluminum:

Material AISI steel	Rockwell C hardness	Applications
W1; D2 L6; S1	65 to 67; 55 to 57; 58 to 60; 60 to 62; 56 to 58; 52 to 54; 54 to 56	Solid die Ejector; Punch; Die Sleeve; Stripper; Ejector mandrel Punch

== Tool Geometry ==
When using the technique of backward impact extrusion, putting an angle on the punch in the press is used to decrease the amount of pressure applied to the punch. This decreases the chance of creating a dead zone, which is an area of no pressure. On the opposite end of things, forward impact extrusion uses a radius on punch to keep the course in the workpiece material moving.

== Example products made from impact extrusion ==
- Metal toothpaste tube
- Aluminium bottle
- CO_{2} cartridge
- Aluminum baseball bat
- Permanent marker pen bodies
- Ammunition cartridges

== History of impact extrusion ==
In 1933, 1937 and 1938, the German engineer Otto Metzger was granted 3 US Patents describing various processes of impact extrusion for forming seamless aluminium, zinc and brass cans.
