= Liberal Jewish Synagogue =

Liberal synagogue in St John's Wood, London, England

- Hebrew: קהל קדוש לב חדש
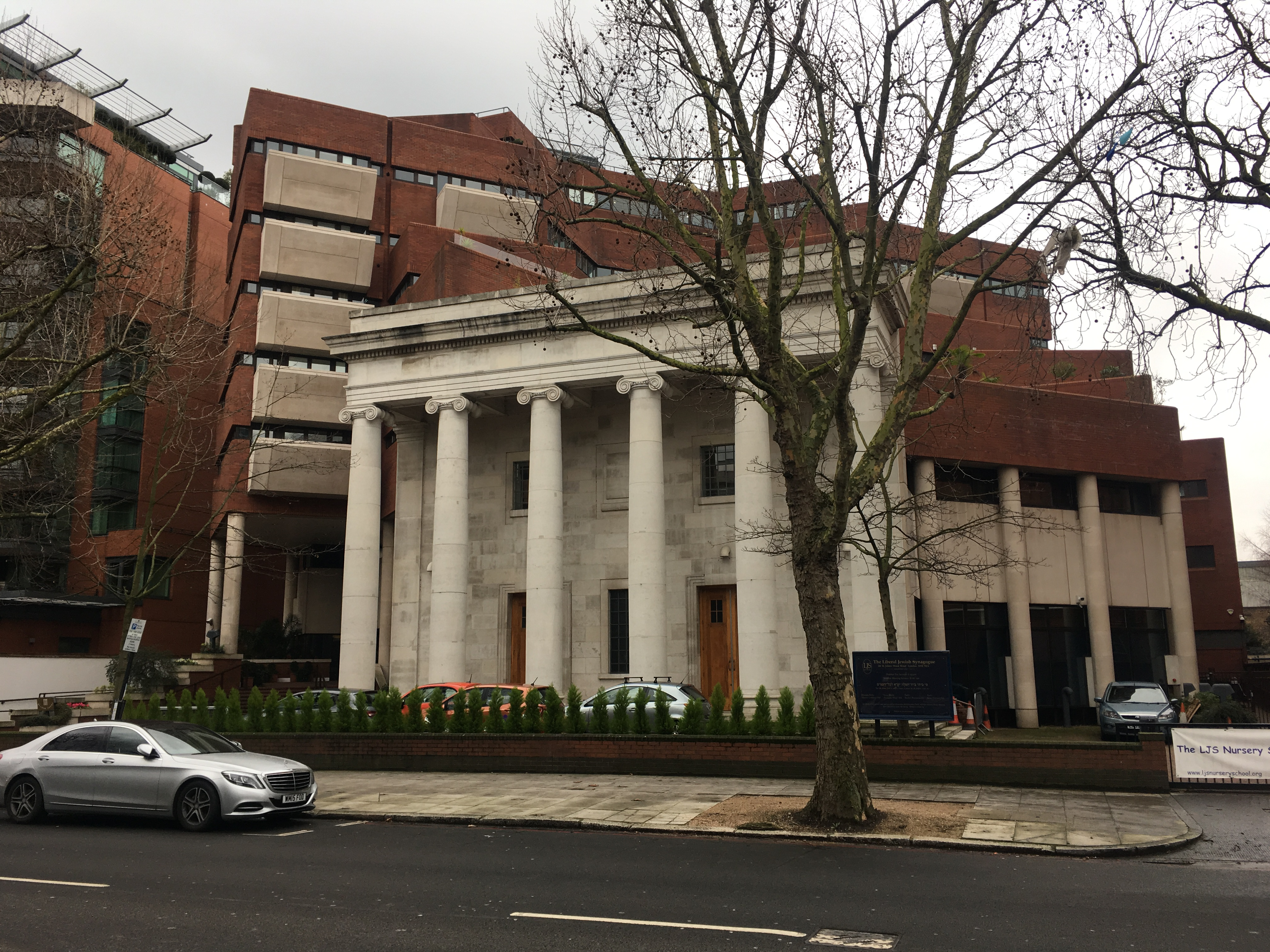
- The synagogue in 2018

- Location of the synagogue in the City of Westminster

Religion
- Affiliation: Reform Judaism
- Rite: Liberal Judaism
- Ecclesiastical or organisational status: Synagogue
- Leadership: Rabbi Rebecca Birk (from January 2027); Rabbi Alexandra Wright; Rabbi Igor Zinkov
- Status: Active

Location
- Location: 28 St John's Wood Road, St John's Wood, City of Westminster, London, England NW8 7HA
- Country: United Kingdom
- Coordinates: 51°31′41″N 0°10′20″W

Architecture
- Architects: Ernest Joseph (1925); Kantor Schwartz (1991); Koski Solomon (1991)
- Type: Synagogue architecture
- Style: Greek Revival
- Established: 1911 (as a congregation)
- Completed: 1925; 1991
- Capacity: 1,020 worshipers

Website
- ljs.org

The Liberal Jewish Synagogue (Hebrew: קהל קדוש לב חדש, romanized: Qahal Kadosh Lev Chadash, lit. 'Holy Congregation New Heart'), abbreviated as LJS, is a Liberal Jewish congregation and synagogue, located in St John's Wood, in the City of Westminster, London, England, in the United Kingdom.

Founded in 1911, the congregation is the oldest and largest member of Britain's Liberal Judaism movement, a constituent member of the World Union for Progressive Judaism. The congregation uses the Lev Chadash denominational prayerbook. Since its earliest days, it has had mixed-gender seating.

== History ==
Claude Montefiore's Jewish Religious Union, established in 1902, opened a prayer association in a converted chapel at 18 Hill Street on 4 February 1911. Within a year, Hebrew Union College graduate Rabbi Israel Mattuck was appointed minister. By 1915, the congregation had 416 members and grew, reaching 784 in 1921. A permanent edifice at St John's Wood, with a capacity of 1,400 people and designed by architect Ernest Joseph, was dedicated on 13 September 1925. Leo Baeck, an internationally famous rabbi and Holocaust survivor, served as the synagogue's president. Lily Montagu was a spiritual as well as a lay leader at the synagogue and a member of the LJS Council from its inception until her death.

Rabbi Mattuck conducted services until 1947, retiring to function as Rabbi Emeritus, and was replaced by his former assistant, Leslie Edgar. John Rayner was senior minister between 1961 and 1989. He was succeeded by David Goldberg, who was in turn replaced by Alexandra Wright in 2004.

== Current rabbis ==
The synagogue's rabbis are Alexandra Wright (Senior Rabbi) and Igor Zinkov.

== Membership ==
It had 1,622 registered members in 1940, rising to 2,600 members in 1954 before peaking at 3,000 in the mid-1970s. Membership levels fell to 2,300 in the mid-1980s, reflecting wider synagogue trends and as more people moved out to the suburbs. According to a 2016 study by the Institute for Jewish Policy Research, the synagogue is in the category of 750 to 999 members by household.

The synagogue has long attracted strong numbers of American expatriate families and rabbis ordained at Hebrew Union College in Cincinnati. Furthermore, it is considered the flagship congregation of Liberal Judaism, which in itself is considered ideologically closer to American Reform Judaism than it is to the Movement for Reform Judaism in the United Kingdom.

== Rituals and edifice ==
Services at the Liberal Jewish Synagogue follow the prayerbooks of the Liberal Judaism movement. The first prayerbook produced by Rabbi Mattuck appeared in 1912 and was influenced by American Reform Judaism and Rabbi David Einhorn's Olat Tamid. In 1962 a new Haggadah was produced by Rabbi John Rayner and Rabbi John Rich of South London Liberal Synagogue. In 1973 Rayner produced a new prayerbook, Service of the Heart to replace Mattuck's earlier prayerbooks. Rayner aimed to strike a balance between traditional and modern liturgical materials. The older establishment was happy to continue with Mattuck's more radical approach, while an increasing number of congregations felt the need for a more tradition kind of service and more Zionism. Service for the Heart was succeeded by Siddur Lev Chadash in 1995, again edited by Rayner. A successor, Siddur Shirah Chadashah is currently being produced. It will fulfil more closely the traditional concept of a siddur, that is a prayer book for Shabbat, the three daily services and for home ceremonies.

Over the years, there has been a gradual re-introduction of some of the traditional rituals and forms of worship abandoned by the synagogue's early leaders. In the 1930s and 1940s the synagogue began to accommodate the different traditions of an increasing number of congregants that were refugees from Europe. The greater impetus for traditional rituals also came from the context of the Holocaust and the establishment of the State of Israel in 1948. The conducting of the Kiddush began for the first time after the war and Friday night services were introduced in 1945. In the 1970s and 1980s, with the encouragement of Rabbi John Rayner and Rabbi David Goldberg, an increasing number of men began to wear a kippah, a practice which is now the norm. The rabbis also moved the congregation towards a greater use of Hebrew in the services.

In 1912, Rabbi Mattuck introduced Confirmation ceremonies, marking a young person's graduation from the Religion School at the age of sixteen. At the time they did not exist in Anglo-Jewry, but were customary in Reform synagogues in the United States. The ceremonies later became known as Kabbalat Torah (Confirmation) by Rabbi Rayner, as a part of a trend towards the greater use of Hebrew. In the 1970s there was mounting pressure for the introduction of Bar and bat mitzvah ceremonies from congregants who felt that Confirmation at age sixteen was not sufficient. The synagogue agreed to introduce Bar and bat mitzvah ceremonies in 1981, with the understanding that the students will then continue with their later Kabbalat Torah studies. This continues to be the status quo at the synagogue.

The original synagogue at the St John's Wood location was erected during 1924 and designed by Ernest Joseph, it was dedicated on 13 September 1925. The portico of the new synagogue consisted of six ionic columns made of Portland stone that were donated by Bernhard Baron, a philanthropist and synagogue member. Inside, there was seating for 1,350 people and a communal hall, named Montefiore Hall, which could accommodate a further 500 people. There were also several classrooms upstairs.

In November 1940, during the Blitz, the building sustained heavy damage from an enemy bomb. It was restored, and reopened with a celebratory service on 24 September 1951. In 1984, the discovery of structural defects convinced the board to demolish and rebuild the sanctuary, whilst maintaining the original portico. The right to build flats above the new synagogue was sold to a developer to help subsidise the project. A concluding prayer was held on 30 April 1988, before relocating to a deconsecrated church hall in Loudoun Road near Swiss Cottage.

Fitzroy Robinson & Partners was commissioned to design the shell of the new building. Israeli architects, Kantor Schwartz, working closely with Koski Solomon, were tasked with designing the sanctuary. In 1988 the original portico was taken down and kept in storage for three years at the London Docklands while the new synagogue was being built. It was then cleaned and reinstated 1.2 metres (3 ft 11 in) from its original position. The front facade replicates the original facade of the 1925 building; the apparent windows are dummies to appear as in the original building. The entrance hall includes a memorial to the six million Jews who were murdered in the Shoah. A three-short-ton (two-point-seven-tonne) Kilkenny limestone block sculpture is the work of Jewish-born Anish Kapoor. The sanctuary was conceived as octagonal. The bimah and three lecterns are made of oak and is enclosed by a high curved wall of Jerusalem stone. The stone was quarried from Hebron by a family whose employees had traditional skills of tooling the stone. The wall was hand-finished in London by a team of Israelis. The ark was designed as the focus of the wall; the doors are a mesh of metals set in frames of bronze. The design and inset of the doors were carried out in Israel by sculptor Amit Schur, while the bronze frame and closing mechanism were manufactured under her direction in Sheffield.

On 13 January 1991, the new edifice was dedicated and reconsecrated the following year. In The Times, Ruth Gledhill praised the five-star architecture, warmer atmosphere and the 'spiritual high'. In the 1990s the new building attracted a marked increase in weddings and press attention from the weddings of high-profile couples such as Simon Sebag Montefiore and his wife, Santa.

== Activities ==
The synagogue lent its support to refugees from Nazi Germany. Rabbi Mattuck raised funds to enable German refugees to come to England. The money that Mattuck raised allowed 156 refugees to escape persecution. Synagogue congregants assisted the refugees with securing employment and the Women's Society tried to ensure that the children they helped had a Jewish education, especially if they lived with non-Jewish families. The synagogue also hosted a club for German refugees, organising dances, lectures and music recitals. The German refugees also began to run language lessons and conducted their own services. They eventually founded their own congregation, Belsize Square Synagogue.

The Marriage (Secretaries of Synagogues) Act 1959 was passed to amend the Marriage Act 1949 to enable the synagogue to certify its own secretary and that of any secretary connected with it. This put Liberal synagogues on the same footing as Orthodox and Reform synagogues for the purposes of civil registration of marriage.

In the 1970s and 1980s the synagogue turned its attention towards the plight of Soviet Jewry, becoming particularly supportive of the refuseniks. An LJS Soviet Jewry Committee was established in 1977 by Doreen Isaacs. The members supported demonstrations and marches, they visited refusenik families in Moscow, Leningrad, Kiev and Odesa. They adopted refuseniks and sent messages of support, Rosh Hashanah cards, Chanukkah greetings and seder services for Passover. The committee produced 100, 000 Russian/Hebrew seder services which were sent out into the Soviet Union. The haggadot with the LJS initials printed were also sent out by Orthodox congregations, with the blessing of the Chief Rabbi, Immanuel Jakobovits, Baron Jakobovits.

== See also ==
- History of the Jews in England
- Liberal Jewish Cemetery, Willesden
- List of Jewish communities in the United Kingdom
- List of synagogues in the United Kingdom
