= Constance Flower =

Lady Battersea, women's activist (1843–1931)

The Right Honourable The Lady Battersea
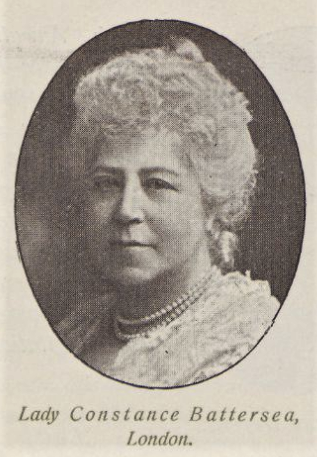
- Constance Flower, Lady Battersea c.1904
- Born: Constance de Rothschild; 29 April 1843; Piccadilly, London, England
- Died: 22 November 1931; Overstrand, England
- Resting place: Willesden Jewish Cemetery
- Occupation: Women's rights activist
- Spouse: Cyril Flower, 1st Baron Battersea
- Children: None
- Parent(s): Sir Anthony de Rothschild, 1st Baronet; Louise Montefiore
- Family: Rothschild family

Constance Flower, Baroness Battersea (née de Rothschild; 29 April 1843, Piccadilly, London – 22 November 1931, Overstrand), also known as Lady Battersea, was a society hostess and philanthropist in London who established the Jewish Association for the Protection of Girls, Women and Children (later subsumed by Jewish Care) in 1885 and was prominent in the Temperance movement in the United Kingdom.

== Biography ==
=== Family ===
Constance was the elder daughter of Sir Anthony and Lady Louise de Rothschild. She had a younger sister, Annie Henrietta (1844–1926), who married the Hon. Eliot Constantine Yorke (1843–1878), son of Charles Yorke, 4th Earl of Hardwicke.

=== Early life ===
Constance was born in London in 1843, spent her early years in Paris, and moved to London in 1847. In 1851 her father acquired a country estate in Aston Clinton where she lived with her family. Along with her sister she taught in the Jews' Free Schools around Aston Clinton, and wrote a book The History and Literature of the Israelites. Although from a Jewish family, her social background was very Christian.

In 1877, she married Cyril Flower (1843–1907), a property developer and Liberal Party politician who later became Lord Battersea. They had met in 1864 through his friendship with her cousin, Leopold de Rothschild. They had no children, and in 1902, Lord Battersea was embroiled in a major homosexual scandal that was suppressed by the Balfour Government.

In 1888, Lord and Lady Battersea acquired two cottages at Overstrand, a village near Cromer, Norfolk, in order to create a holiday home. In 1897 their architect, Edwin Lutyens, rebuilt and joined the cottages to form a large mansion, The Pleasaunce. The extensive gardens were developed between 1902 and 1930 by Lord Battersea and his wife. Lord Battersea died in 1907.

=== Women's rights activism ===
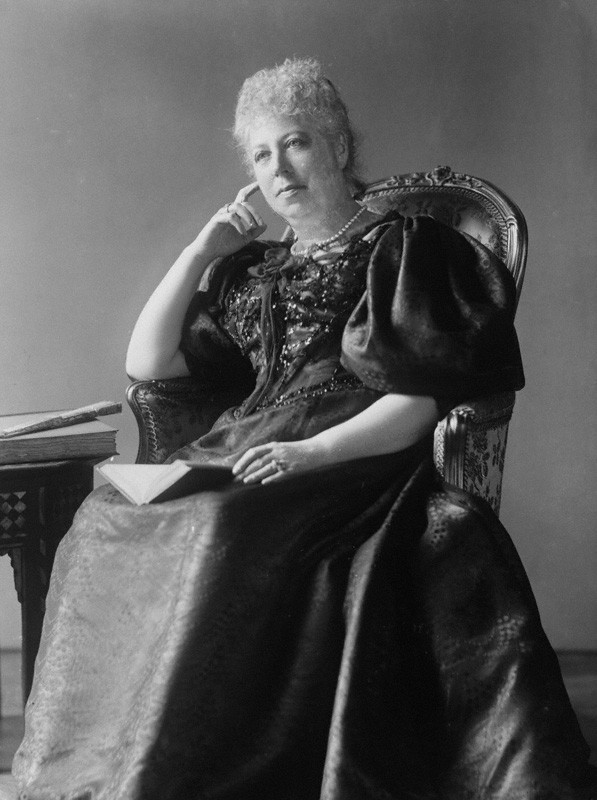
Lady Battersea by Alexander Bassano, half-plate glass negative, 1897

Lady Battersea was engaged in the temperance movement, taking the pledge in 1894, and joined the British Women's Temperance Association. Her political engagement was in part motivated by her close friend suffragette, Gwenllian Elizabeth Fanny Morgan, and propelled her into the reform movement of women's prisons in England. After scandals of child prostitution committed by East European Jews were reported in the UK press, she co-founded the Jewish Association for the Protection of Girls and Women (JAPGW) in 1885 as the Ladies' Association for Prevention and Rescue Work, a distinctively Jewish association to shelter and support Jewish immigrants. The JAPGW turned Jewish women immigrants into British feminists, setting the groundwork for the future Union of Jewish Women. The JAPGW also set up the Industrial Training School which trained women to become domestic servants, matrons and home managers. She led the JAPGW until the early 1920s, participating in international meetings and coordinating international rescue operations.

Lady Battersea also turned her homes in London and Overstrand into shelters for unmarried mothers and women rescued from prostitution.

Her close ties with the International Council of Women helped her fight off the reluctance of Jewish higher society to admit that a Jewish prostitution problem existed. After joining the executive committee of the National Union of Women Workers, she became the union's vice-president in 1896, and served as its president for the years 1902–1903, taking over from Kathleen Lyttelton who had held the position in 1900–1901. She remained on the executive committee until 1919, and was made Honorary President of the union after that date. Through her work, she was instrumental in the emergence of conscious Anglo-Jewish feminism.

Lord and Lady Battersea were noted for their philanthropy towards working-class people. She was appointed by the Government to the board of Aylesbury Women's Prison.

== Death and legacy ==
Lady Battersea died in The Pleasaunce on 22 November 1931 on the anniversary of her marriage and was buried at the Willesden Jewish Cemetery. The Pleasaunce was split into separate lots and sold.

The National Portrait Gallery, London holds several portraits of her in its collection.

== Publications ==
- Battersea, Constance (1922). Reminiscences. Macmillan and co. ASIN B002WTRC9E.
- The history and literature of the Israelites according to the Old Testament and the Apocrypha (with Annie Henrietta Yorke) (1870) (volume 1) & (vollume 2)
