= William Moses Feldman =

English physician and writer

William Moses Feldman FRSE FRCP FRAS

Personal details
- Born: 11 November 1880 Pinsk, Russia
- Died: 2 July 1939 (aged 58) London, England
- Occupation: Doctor

William Moses Feldman (1880–1939) was a Russian-born expert on child health in Britain.

== Life ==
He was born on 11 November 1880 in Pinsk in Russia the son of Israel Feldman. The family came to London in 1889 and William was then educated at the Jews College then trained as a doctor at the London Hospital. He set up as a General Practitioner (GP) in Whitechapel in east London around 1911, also working at the Eastern Dispensary. He then moved to Plaistow also in east London, as Senior Physician to the St Mary's Hospital for Women and Children. He received his doctorate (MD) in 1920.

In 1923 he was elected a Fellow of the Royal Society of Edinburgh. His proposers were John W. Ballantyne, Diarmid Noel Paton, Sir James Crichton-Browne, Francis James Blight and Anderson Gray McKendrick. He was a member of Stepney Borough Council and active on the Council for the Study of Inebriety. In later life his practice moved to Harley Street and he was one of the noteworthy doctors of that street. He lived on Finchley Road. A keen astronomer, he was elected a Fellow of the Royal Astronomical Society in 1934.

He died of a heart attack at home in London on 2 July 1939.

== Family ==
In 1913, he married his first cousin, Hilda Kate Feldman. They had one daughter and two sons.

== Publications ==
- A Manual of Nursery Hygiene (1910)
- The Jewish Child (1917)
- Principles of Ante- and Post-Natal Child Physiology (1920)
- Ante- and Post-Natal Child Hygiene (1927)
- Rabbinical Mathematics and Astronomy (1931)
- General Haematology: with Special Reference to the Child in Health and Disease (1933)
- Biomathematics (1935)
