= Ernest Joseph =

British architect and youth worker (1877–1960)

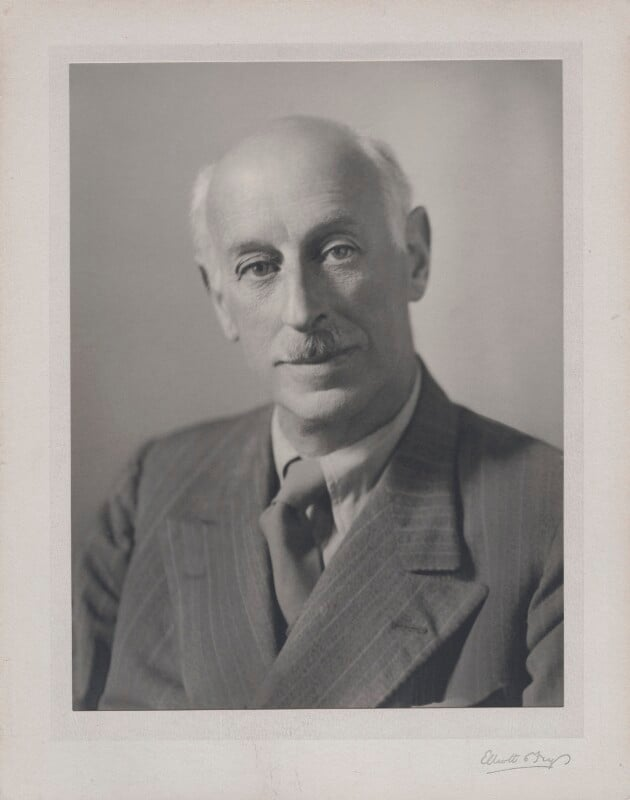
Joseph in 1943

Ernest Martin Joseph, OBE (8 January 1877 – 30 August 1960) was an architect and youth worker. He was a leading designer of synagogues, including the Art Deco synagogue at Sheepcote Street, Birmingham, and the classically styled synagogue in St. John's Wood Road, London. He was also a partner in the firm of Messrs Joseph, whose best known building is Shell Mex House between the Strand and the Thames Embankment in London. He was one of six children of Nathan Solomon Joseph (1834–1909), also an architect and social worker, and his wife Alice who died in his infancy. N. S. Joseph was brother-in-law to the chief rabbi, Hermann Adler.

Ernest Joseph was educated at St Paul's School and devoted himself to Jewish youth from his twenties until days before his death. In the First World War he worked to provide buildings for what later became the NAAFI and was promoted Major and appointed Member of the Order of the British Empire. In the years before the Second World War he worked to provide for the influx of Jewish refugees from Germany. He returned to NAAFI work in the Second World War and was appointed Officer of the Order of the British Empire in 1947.

Ernest and his wife Emma had been founder members of the Liberal Jewish Synagogue in 1910. His father had toyed with the Jewish Religious Union, his status as architect to the United Synagogue notwithstanding. Ernest became Honorary Architect to the Union of Liberal and Progressive Synagogues and was responsible for the design of their premier building at St John's Wood in 1925 and for its reconstruction after bomb damage in November 1940. (The building was demolished in 1991 and only the portico remains.) He played a prominent role in the affairs of this synagogue, being elected to the Council in 1929, and serving as treasurer between 1936 and 1953 and vice-president from 1953 until his retirement in 1956.

== Sources ==
- Kadish, Sharman (1995). A Good Jew & a Good Englishman: The Jewish Lads' & Girls' Brigade, 1895–1995. Vallentine Mitchell. p. 111.
