= Willesden New Cemetery =

Cemetery in Brent, London

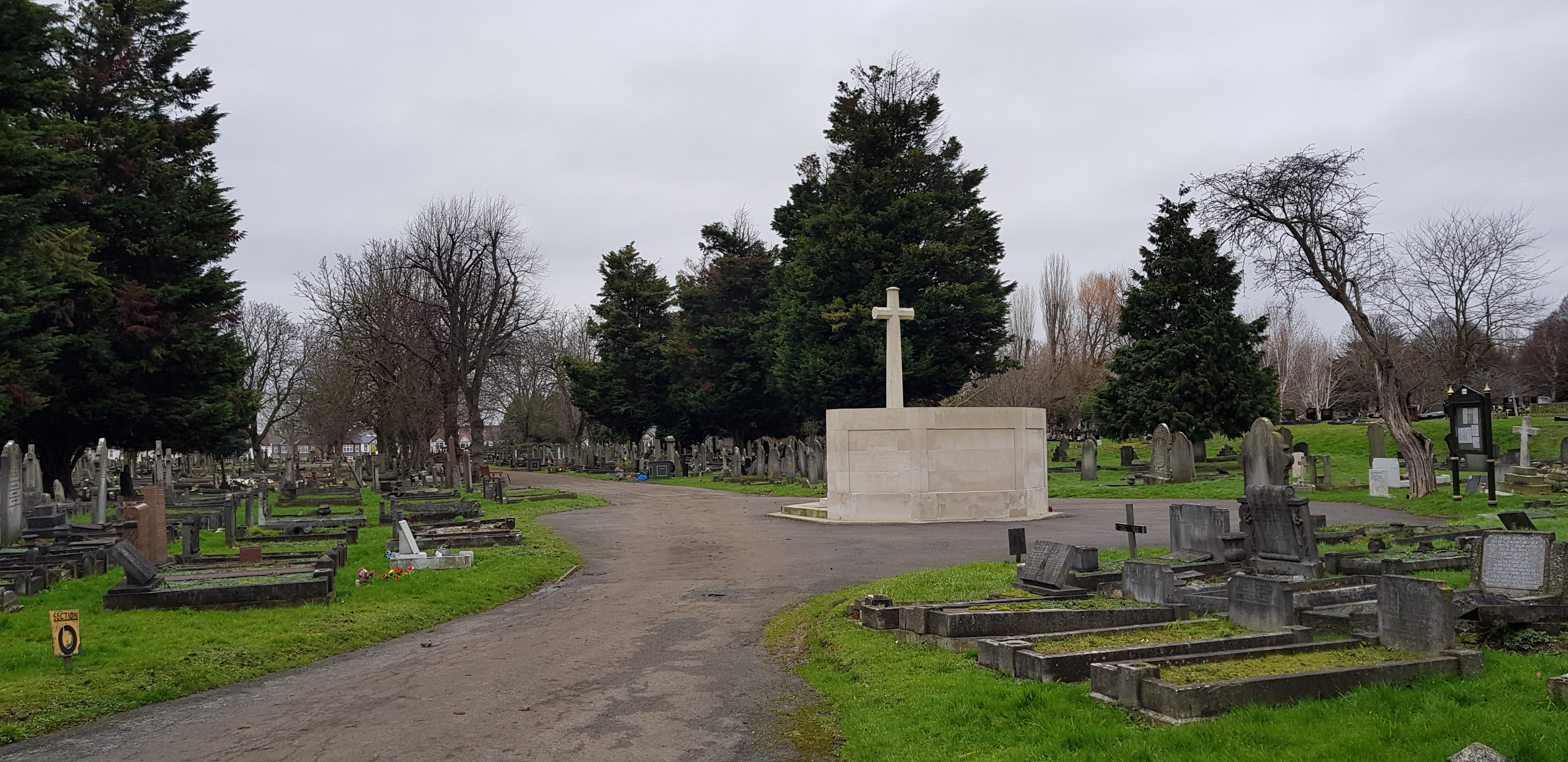
- Interactive map of Willesden New Cemetery

Details
- Established: 1891
- Location: Willesden, (London Borough of Brent), London NW10 9TE
- Country: England
- Coordinates: 51.545°N 0.243°W
- Type: Active
- Owned by: London Borough of Brent
- Size: 26 acres
- Website: Willesden New Cemetery
- Find a Grave: Willesden New Cemetery

Willesden New Cemetery is a civic cemetery at Franklyn Road, Willesden, in the London Borough of Brent. It opened in 1891 and includes a memorial to local civilians who died in World War II. It previously included chapels, now demolished, by Charles H Worley.

The cemetery contains war graves of 130 Commonwealth service personnel who died in World War I and 121 who died in World War II. Most of these graves are scattered throughout the cemetery apart from 39 World War II graves forming an informal group, while a Screen Wall memorial lists personnel from both wars whose graves could not be individually marked by headstones.

Hajie Mohammed Dollie who opened the first Muslim mosque in London and died in 1906, is buried here.

== See also ==
- Liberal Jewish Cemetery, Willesden
- Willesden Jewish Cemetery
