= Cyril Flower, 1st Baron Battersea =

British Liberal politician (1843–1907)

The Right Honourable The Lord Battersea
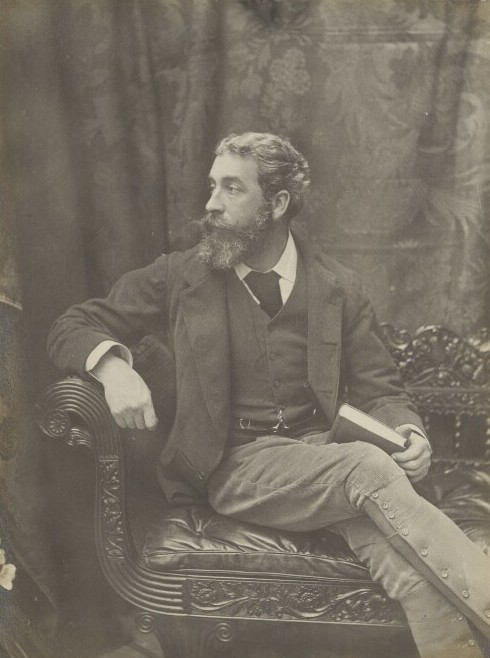
- Cyril Flower, early 1890s self-portrait

Member of Parliament for Luton
- In office 1885–1892
- Preceded by: New constituency
- Succeeded by: Samuel Whitbread

Member of Parliament for Brecon
- In office 1880–1885
- Preceded by: James Gwynne-Holford
- Succeeded by: Constituency abolished

Personal details
- Born: Cyril Flower; 30 August 1843 Tooting, London, England
- Died: 27 November 1907 (aged 64)
- Party: Liberal
- Spouse: Constance Rothschild (m. 1877)

Cyril Flower, 1st Baron Battersea (30 August 1843 – 27 November 1907) was a British Liberal politician and patron of art.

== Background and education ==
Flower was the third of 18 children (the second of 12 sons) of Philip William Flower, of Furze Down, Streatham, Surrey, 10 by his first wife and first cousin Mary (daughter of Jonathan Flower) who died in 1857, and 8 by his second wife Elizabeth Jephson. Cyril was born in 1843 at Tooting in the 18th-century Hill House and later lived in Streatham, both of which were rural environs at the time. He was educated at Harrow and Trinity College, Cambridge, and was called to the Bar, Inner Temple, in 1870. As well as exceptional good looks, it was said he possessed a genius for friendship, and an 'irresistible charm' that made everyone 'want to pet him'.

His father and uncle had earlier established a successful merchant house in Sydney, Australia. In 1838, the pair had sailed to Australia in order to establish themselves as merchants in Sydney. In 1842 the partnership of Flower, Salting & Co was formed, shipping wool, tallow and gold to London. In 1842/3, Philip returned there, leaving his brother to oversee operations in Sydney. He then established the firm of P.W. Flower and Co., and his property included Collier's Quay and other London wharves. From 1867, and with other partners, Philip began developing part of the newly laid out Victoria Street in Westminster. St. Philips Square was named by Philip Flower as was St. Philip's Church in its centre, which was consecrated in July 1870.

== Property development ==
Like his father, Flower also became involved in property development, and assisted his brother Arthur with the development of Battersea's Park Town after the death of his father in 1872. James Knowles, Junior, was engaged as architect and surveyor for the Park Town development, a lozenge-shaped estate running either side of Queens Road (now Queenstown Road) which extended from Battersea Park Road to Wandsworth Road. He also developed the mansion blocks lining the south side of Prince of Wales Drive.

In 1888 Flower and his wife acquired two cottages at Overstrand for the purposes of creating a holiday home. In 1897 their architect, Edwin Lutyens, rebuilt and joined them to form a large mansion in extensive gardens, The Pleasaunce.

== Political career ==
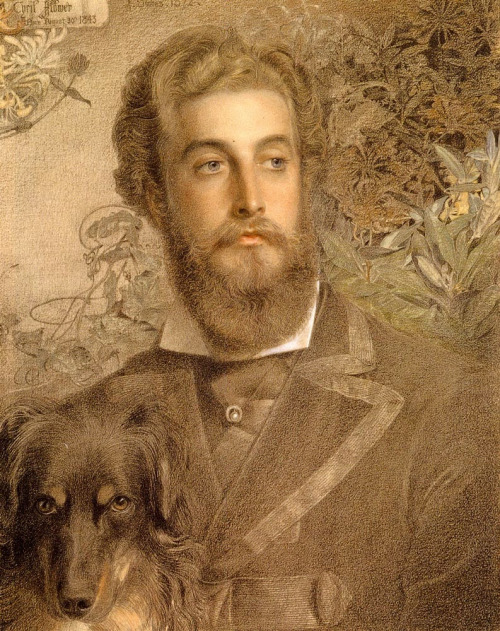
Portrait of Cyril Flower (1872), by Frederick Sandys.

Aided by his wife's fortune, in 1880 Flower entered Parliament for Brecon, a seat he held until 1885 when the constituency was abolished, and then represented Luton until 1892. He served briefly as a Junior Lord of the Treasury from February to July 1886 in the third Liberal administration of William Ewart Gladstone. He was widely referred to as "the most handsome man in the House of Commons", and was a great favourite of Gladstone who, in 1892, raised him to the peerage as Baron Battersea of Battersea in the County of London and of Overstrand in the County of Norfolk. He took the motto Flores curat Deus ("God cares for the flowers"). In 1893 Battersea was offered the governorship of New South Wales. However he sacrificially turned it down due to the separation it would have imposed on Lady Battersea from her mother, who also enjoyed his company.

He was president of the National Education Association as late as 1902, when the association was heavily involved in debating the Education Bill.

== Patron of the arts ==
Apart from his property development and political career he was also a great collector and patron of art. He was a patron of James McNeill Whistler and was involved with the Pre-Raphaelite set. His bedroom in his London residence was one of the few interiors completed by Carlo Bugatti.

== Personal life ==
In 1877 Battersea married Constance, daughter of Sir Anthony de Rothschild, whom he met in 1864 through his friendship with her cousin, Leopold de Rothschild. The marriage was childless. Battersea favoured men: a close friend and possible lover was the psychical researcher Frederic W. H. Myers. Other friends included Henry James and Sir Edward Burne-Jones. There are indications that Lady Battersea disapproved of some of his friends, and in her memoirs she cautiously comments that she had intuitively felt that "some of the very ardent and sudden likings he occasionally took to certain persons might lead to misplaced friendship".

Battersea maintained a broad range of other interests, as a politician, art collector, sportsman, and photographer, and had a love for decoration and had a love for bright colour, both in his houses and on his person. At Overstrand he was described as appearing "a gorgeous vision of pale blue, sea-green, or rose-coloured silk". Wrote another: "He is a handsome man, but at times affects costumes which would make him more at home in the pages of Ouida than in scenes of ordinary life."

In 1902, Battersea was involved in a homosexual scandal. Although ringleader in the case, in which two procurers were imprisoned, he was secretly granted immunity from prosecution by the Government of Arthur Balfour.

Lord and Lady Battersea were noted for their philanthropy towards the working class, and following her husband's enforced retirement, Lady Battersea devoted most of her time and vast wealth to improving the living conditions of female prisoners; her work was recognised by her appointment by the Government to a prison board.

Battersea died from pneumonia in November 1907, aged 64, when the barony became extinct.

Lady Battersea's memoirs make plain her admiration for her husband, her enjoyment of his career, and their mutual interests, but also her frustrations. Lady Battersea died in November 1931.

== Arms ==
Coat of arms of Cyril Flower, 1st Baron Battersea

Crest
Issuant out of clouds, a cubit arm erect proper, the hand holding a rose and a lily argent, each slipped vert.
Escutcheon
Or in pale three inescutcheons Vert each charged with a fleur-de-lis of the first between j two flaunches of the second.
Supporters
Dexter a mermaid Proper semée of fleur-de-lis Azure holding in her right hand three arrows Or sinister a sea-horse Proper collared Or and semée of roses Gules.
Motto
Flores Curat Deus

== Notes ==
Parliament of the United Kingdom
| Preceded by James Gwynne-Holford | Member of Parliament for Brecon; 1880–1885 | Constituency abolished |
| New constituency | Member of Parliament for Luton; 1885–1892 | Succeeded by Samuel Whitbread |
Peerage of the United Kingdom
| New creation | Baron Battersea; 1892–1907 | Title extinct |
