= Willesden Jewish Cemetery =

Cemetery in Willesden, London

Coordinates: 51.5447°N 0.2399°W

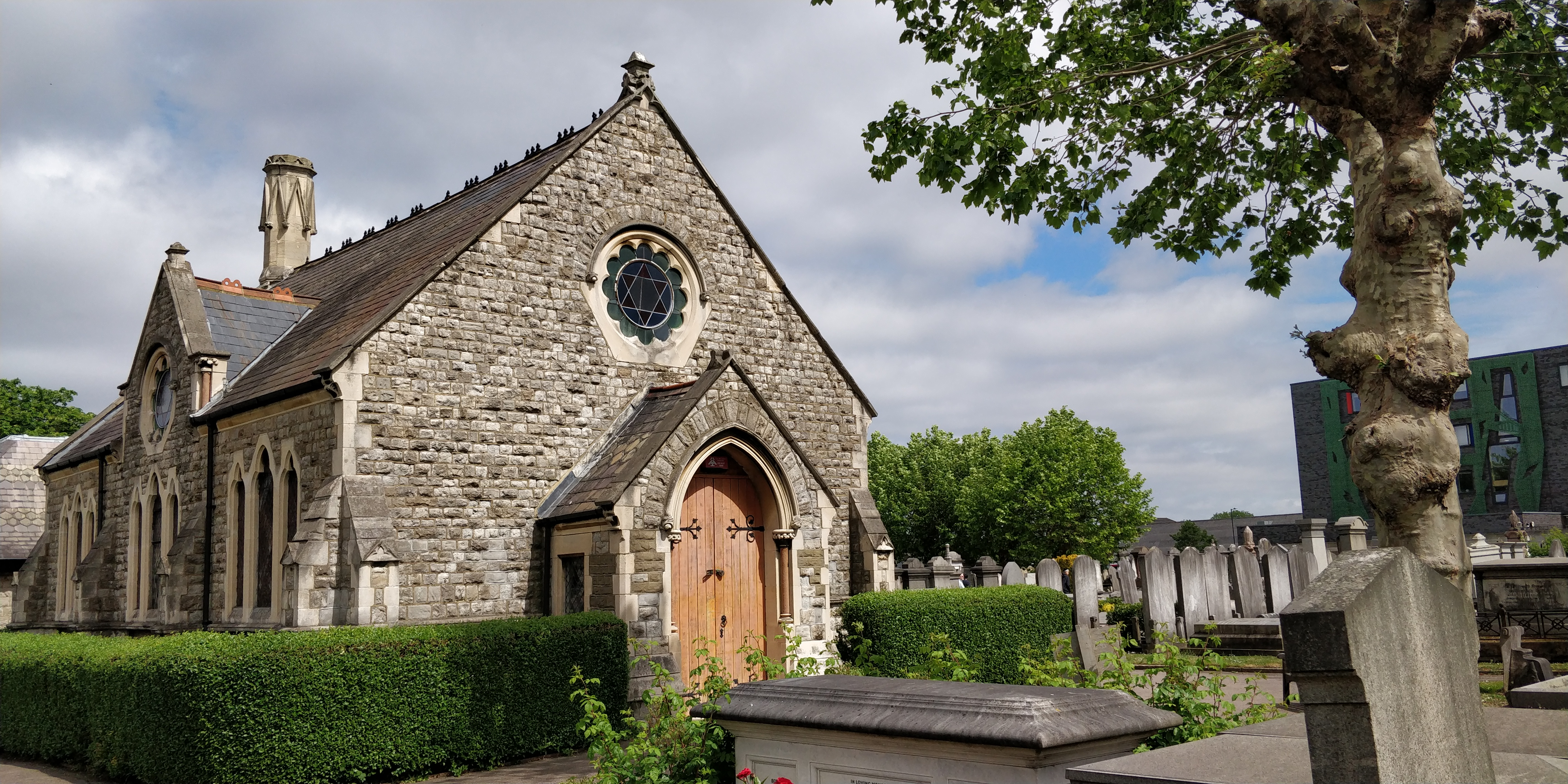
- The cemetery's prayer hall, designed by Nathan Solomon Joseph
- Interactive map of Willesden Jewish Cemetery

Details
- Established: 1873
- Location: Beaconsfield Road, Willesden (London Borough of Brent), London NW10 2JE
- Country: England, United Kingdom
- Type: Orthodox Jewish
- Style: Victorian; English Gothic
- Owned by: United Synagogue Burial Society
- Size: about 8.5 hectares
- No. of graves: 29,800
- Website: Official website

Listed Building – Grade II
- Official name: Willesden Jewish Cemetery (United Synagogue Cemetery)
- Designated: 4 September 2017
- Reference no.: 1449184

House of Life project, Willesden Cemetery
- Formation: 2015
- Legal status: Registered charity
- Purpose: To preserve the heritage of, increase accessibility to and increase biodiversity at Willesden Jewish Cemetery.
- Headquarters: Willesden Jewish Cemetery
- Head of Heritage: Miriam Marson
- Parent organization: United Synagogue
- Website: www.willesdenjewishcemetery.org.uk

The Willesden United Synagogue Cemetery, usually known as Willesden Jewish Cemetery, is a Jewish cemetery at Beaconsfield Road, Willesden, in the London Borough of Brent, England. It opened in 1873. It has been described as the "Rolls-Royce" of London's Jewish cemeteries and as "The Eighth" of London's Magnificent Seven cemeteries. It is designated Grade II on Historic England's Register of Historic Parks and Gardens. The cemetery, which has 29,800 graves, (Note: 23 members of the Rothschild family are buried in the cemetery. Hinson, Tamara (15 October 2020). "A date with death: Why a visit to Willesden Jewish Cemetery is more uplifting than morbid". The Independent.) has many significant memorials and monuments. Four of them are listed at Grade II. They include the tomb of Rosalind Franklin, who was a co-discoverer of the structure of DNA. Nathan Rothschild, 1st Baron Rothschild and members of his family are also buried in the cemetery.

In 2015, the United Synagogue, which owns and manages the cemetery, was awarded a grant from the National Lottery Heritage Fund to restore some key features of the cemetery and to create a visitor centre, a permanent exhibition and a web-based education project. The cemetery's heritage project, House of Life, officially opened up the cemetery to visitors on 7 September 2020: It has a programme of public outreach events that have included walking tours, an online literary festival ("Life Lines") and an exhibition at Willesden Library.

In 2026, the Association of Significant Cemeteries in Europe recognised it as a "significant cemetery".

== History and heritage listing ==
The cemetery, developed on ground purchased from All Souls College, Oxford, was opened in 1873, three years after the United Synagogue was established by Act of Parliament. It was expanded in 1890, in 1906 and between 1925 and 1926. The cemetery and its funerary buildings, in English Gothic style, were designed by the architect Nathan Solomon Joseph (1834–1909).

In 2017 Historic England listed the cemetery at Grade II on the grounds of: its being the first venture of the United Synagogue; its having associations with many influential families and individuals who are buried there; its overall design by a prominent Jewish architect; "the quality, opulence and variety displayed by the monuments as a group, reflecting both Jewish traditions and English influences"; and its survival – "the Old Cemetery remains intact, whilst the subsequent evolution of the cemetery is well-documented and legible".

== War graves and listed war memorial ==
The cemetery has 33 Commonwealth service war graves from World War I, (Note: Eight of the Commonwealth service war graves from World War I are soldiers who were from, or had a connection to, Australia. Page, Beth. "Willesden – Brent: Willesden Jewish Cemetery". WW1 Australian soldiers & nurses who rest in the United Kingdom.) six of which form a small group by the Assembly Hall, and 77 from World War II, 22 of them grouped in a war graves plot. These include the grave of Dudley Joel (1904–1941), businessman and Conservative Party politician, who died in World War II.

In place of a Cross of Sacrifice, a memorial designed by Ralph Hobday in the form of an obelisk was placed in 1961 by the Commonwealth War Graves Commission opposite the World War II war graves plot. It commemorates both world wars. Israel Brodie, the Chief Rabbi, consecrated the memorial, which was unveiled by Field Marshal Sir Gerald Templer. The first national Jewish war memorial in the United Kingdom, it is Grade II listed.

== Other listed monuments ==
There are three other Grade II listed monuments at the cemetery:

- The tomb of Maximilian (Max) Eberstadt (1844–1891), secretary to the British merchant banker Ernest Cassel. His tomb was designed by Edward Burne-Jones.
- The tomb of Rosalind Franklin (1920–1958), chemist, X-ray crystallographer and a co-discoverer of the structure of DNA.
- The tombs and burial enclosures of Baron Mayer Amschel de Rothschild (1818–1874), businessman and Liberal Party MP, his wife Juliana (1818–1874) and their daughter Hannah Primrose (1851–1890), who became Countess of Rosebery and a political hostess and philanthropist. Their tombs were housed in a mausoleum constructed in the 1890s, but this was destroyed by a Second World War bomb in 1941.
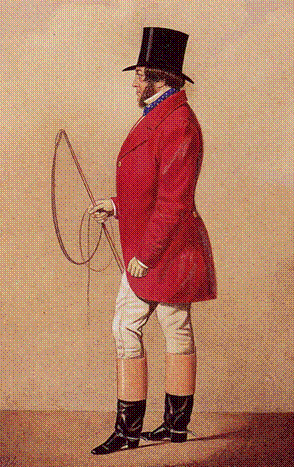
Cartoon of Baron Mayer Amschel de Rothschild

Hannah, Countess of Rosebery, painted by Frederic, Lord Leighton

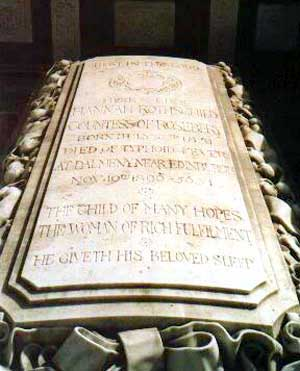
Grave of Hannah Primrose, Countess of Rosebery

== See also ==
- List of people buried at Willesden Jewish Cemetery
- United Synagogue
- Liberal Jewish Cemetery, Willesden
- Willesden New Cemetery
- Jewish cemeteries in the London area
