= Asher (name) =

- Gender: Primarily male
- Language: English, Hebrew

Origin
- Languages: Old English, German, Hebrew
- Meaning: "one who lives by an ash tree or ash grove" (Old English) "fortunate" or "happy" (Hebrew)
- Region of origin: England, Germany, Israel

Other names
- Variant forms: Osher; Usher
- Related names: Ash, Ashley, Ashton, Zelig,

Asher is an English-language occupational surname for an ash maker, derived from the Middle English surname "Aschere" or from the German "Äscher" (Ashman). It can also be a form of the Old English surname "Æsċer" (Æsċe + ere), meaning "one who lives by an ash tree or ash grove."

It is also a common Jewish first name and surname (Hebrew: אָשֵׁר; also transliterated as Osher and Usher) meaning "fortunate" or "happy" in Hebrew, unrelated to the Germanic occupational root. It is the name of Asher, the son of Jacob, in the Tanakh.

== People with the surname ==
- Alec Asher (born 1991), baseball player
- Alexander Asher (1835–1905), Scottish politician
- Allan Asher (born 1951), Australian public affairs official and activist
- Barry Asher (born 1946), American bowler
- Bud Asher (1925–2013), American politician, football coach and lawyer
- Gerald Asher (born 1932), wine writer, ex-wine merchant
- Hank Asher (c. 1951–2013), businessman
- Helen Asher (1927–2001), German-born Australian novelist and short story writer
- Herb Asher (born 1944), university professor
- Iraena Asher (1979–disappeared 2004), New Zealand trainee teacher and model, disappeared
- Irving Asher (1903–1985), motion picture producer
- Jack Asher (1916–1991), British cinematographer
- Jana Asher, American statistician and human rights activist
- Jane Asher (born 1946), English actress and novelist
- Jane Asher (swimmer) (born 1931), British swimmer
- Japhet Asher (born 1961), English filmmaker
- Jeremy Asher (born 1958), English businessman
- John Mallory Asher (born 1971), American actor and director
- Joseph Mayor Asher (1872–1909), English-American rabbi and professor
- Lee Asher (born 1976), magician
- Max Asher, drummer of the band Warrant
- Maxine Asher (1930–2015), researcher and businesswoman
- Michael Asher (artist) (1943–2012), an American conceptual artist
- Michael Asher (explorer) (born 1953), a British explorer and author
- Neal Asher (born 1961), English science fiction writer
- Peter Asher (born 1944), artist and record producer
- Richard Asher (1912–1969), British endocrinologist and hematologist
- Robert Asher (director) (1915–1979), a British film and television director
- Roderick Asher (1931–1997), American geologist
- Tommy Asher (1936–2017), English footballer
- Tony Asher (born 1939), American lyricist
- William Asher (1921–2012), American producer, director and writer
- Zev Asher (1963–2013), Canadian musician and film director

== People with the given name ==
=== Male ===
- Asher Angel (born 2002), American actor
- Asher Allen (born 1988), University of Georgia cornerback
- Asher Asher (1837–1889), Scottish physician
- Asher ben Jehiel (1250 or 1259–1328), rabbi and Talmudist
- Asher Benjamin (1773–1845), American architect
- Asher Bilu (born 1936), Australian artist
- Asher Blinkoff (born 2008), American child actor
- Asher Book (born 1988), American actor
- Asher Brown Durand (1796–1886), American painter
- Asher Cohen, psychologist and President of the Hebrew University of Jerusalem
- Asher D (disambiguation)
- Asher Hirsch Ginsberg (1856–1927), pseudonym Ahad Ha'am, essayist
- Asher Grodman (born 1987), American actor
- Asher Hong (born 2004), American artistic gymnast
- Asher Hucklesby (1844–1908), mayor of Luton, Bedfordshire, UK and hat manufacturer
- Asher Karni (born 1954), businessman known for involvement of Pakistani and Israeli nuclear programs
- Asher Lämmlein (c. 1500), German who proclaimed himself a forerunner of the Jewish Messiah in 1502
- Asher Levy (died 1682), butcher who left Recife, Brazil for New Amsterdam, U.S. in 1654
- Asher Peres (1934–2005), Israeli physicist
- Asher Robbins (1757–1845), United States Senator
- Asher Roth (born 1985), American rapper
- Asher Tishler (born 1947), Israeli economist; president of the College of Management Academic Studies

=== Female ===
- Asher Jay, designer, artist, and conservationist
- Asher Keddie (born 1974), Australian actress
- Asher Yasbincek (born 2001), American actress

== Fictional characters named Asher ==
- Asher, one of Jonas' best friends in The Giver
- Asher Lev, the main character in the 1972 novel by Chaim Potok, My Name is Asher Lev.
- Asher Siegel, one of the protagonists in the 2023 television show The Curse
- Ashur Genge 2023 Canadian Historical Fiction [Rage The Night] by Donna Morrissey

== See also ==
- Ascher, an alternative spelling of Asher
- Asha (disambiguation)
- Ben Asher (surname)
