= Ascher =

Surname list

Ascher is a German surname. Notable people with the surname include:

- Daisy Ascher (1944–2003), Mexican photographer
- Fritz Ascher (1893–1970), German artist
- John Ascher, entomologist
- Joseph Ascher (1829–1869), Dutch composer and court pianist to Eugénie de Montijo
- Kate Ascher, author and executive vice president of the New York City Economic Development Corporation
- Kenneth Lee Ascher (born 1944), American jazz pianist and composer
- Leo Ascher (1880–1942), Jewish composer
- Marcia Ascher (1935–2013), American mathematician
- Mathias Ascher (pseudonym of Nathan Birnbaum) (1864–1937), Austrian Jewish journalist and philosopher
- Peter-Wolf Ascher (1939–2023), Austrian neurosurgeon
- Saul Ascher (1767–1822), Jewish narrative writer and publicist
- Tova Ascher, Israeli female film editor and director
- William Ascher (born 1947), American professor of public policy
- Zika Ascher (1910–1992), Czech refugee textile designer and manufacturer in London and Paris

== See also ==
- Æschere
- Asher (disambiguation)
- Berggasthaus Äscher
