= Ben Asher (surname) =

Ben Asher is a Jewish surname meaning "son of Asher".

- Aaron ben Moses ben Asher (died c. 960), Scribe who refined the Tiberian system for writing down vowel sounds in Hebrew
- Aaron ben Asher of Karlin (1802–1872), Russian Hasidic rabbi
- Aryeh Leib ben Asher Gunzberg (1695–1785), Rabbinical casuist often referred to by the name of his most famous book, Shaagas Aryeh
- Bahya ben Asher (1255–1340), Aragonese rabbi and Kabbalist
- Chaim Raphael ben Asher (1714–1772), Chief sephardi rabbi of Israel
- Eleazar ben Asher, Late Medieval German-Jewish chronicler
- Haim Ben-Asher (1904–1998), Israeli politician
- Isaac ben Asher, Early Medieval Talmudic commentator
- Jacob ben Asher (c. 1269 – c. 1343) German and Spanish rabbi
- Jehiel ben Asher, Andalusian Jewish poet
- Judah ben Asher (1270–1349), German and Spanish rabbi

== See also ==
- Asher (name)
- Aabed-El ben Asher ben Matzliach (born 1935), current high priest of the Samaritans
