= Solomon Abudarham =

Chief Rabbi Solomon Abudarham
- Died: December 1804; Gibraltar
- Resting place: Jews' Gate Cemetery; 36.1205°N 5.3454°W
- Other name: Shelomo Abudarham II
- Known for: Academy of Rabbi Solomon Abudarham; Flemish Synagogue; Abudarham Synagogue
- Predecessor: Chief Rabbi Yehuda ben Yitshak Halevi

Solomon Abudarham (died 1804) was Chief Rabbi of the British Overseas Territory of Gibraltar until his death from yellow fever in December 1804. Also known as Shelomo Abudarham II, the rabbi established a school of religious study on Parliament Lane and laid the inaugural stone for Flemish Synagogue on Line Wall Road. In 1820, his academy was converted into the Abudarham Synagogue, named after the rabbi.

== Biography ==
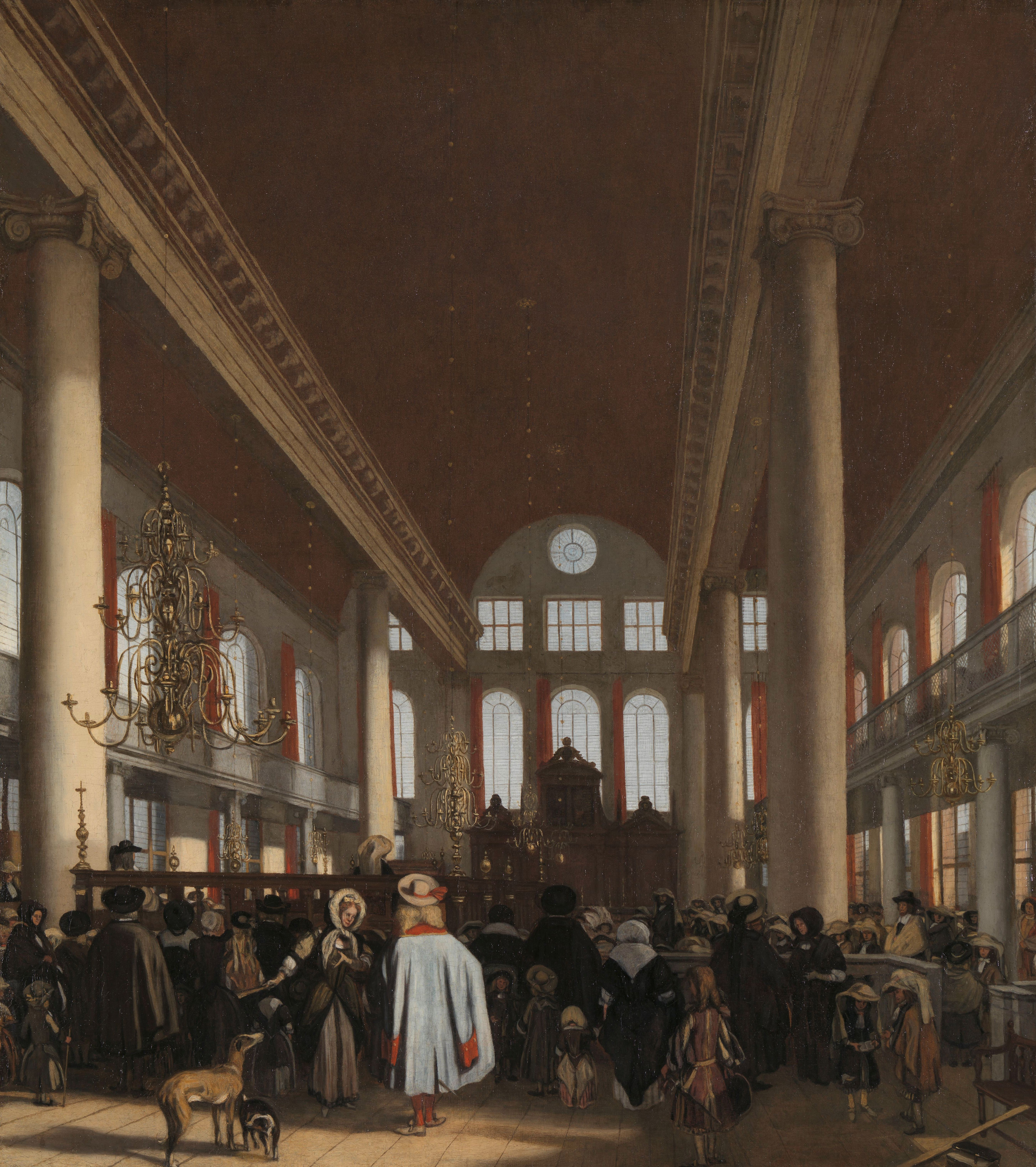
The Flemish Synagogue resembled the Portuguese Synagogue (above) in Amsterdam.

Solomon Abudarham, also known as Shelomo Abudarham II, was the grandson of Shelomo Abudarham I of Tétouan, Morocco. It is also probable that he is the descendant of the Spanish Rabbi David Abudarham, author of Sefer Abudarham. The younger Abudarham immigrated to the British Overseas Territory of Gibraltar from Morocco in 1790, prompted by the reign of terror which began when the Muslim Mawlay al-Yazid became Sultan of Morocco following the death of Sidi Muhammad ben Abdallah that year. Abudarham succeeded Rabbi Yehuda ben Yitshak Halevi as Chief Rabbi of Gibraltar.

The late 18th century was a time of prosperity for Gibraltar's merchants due to the French Revolutionary Wars. At the same time, some of the congregants of the Great Synagogue on Engineer Lane had reservations about the trend toward a less formal, more Moroccan style of service at their house of worship. They opted to build a new, lavish synagogue on Line Wall Road, with a service that would be more in-keeping with that of the Portuguese Synagogue in Amsterdam, Netherlands. The new synagogue was built in a garden for a total of US$26,300 and closely resembled the Amsterdam synagogue. It was entitled Nefusot Yehudah (The Dwelling of Judah), but is more commonly known as the Flemish Synagogue (Spanish: Esnoga Flamenca). It was founded at the turn of the 19th century, in 1799 or 1800. Chief Rabbi Abudarham laid the inaugural stone which bears his name and is still present at the site. He also established a Bet Medrash (School of Jewish religious study), the Academy of Rabbi Solomon Abudarham, on Parliament Lane.

Chief Rabbi Solomon Abudarham died in the 1804 yellow fever epidemic which claimed more than a thousand lives in Gibraltar. He was interred in Jews' Gate Cemetery on Windmill Hill near the southern entrance to the Upper Rock Nature Reserve. His grave rests in an enclosure which also surrounds the tombs of other Dayanim (Judges of Religious Law). His tomb is the oldest of the six Dayanim in the enclosure. The rabbi's inscription reads:

Tomb of the crown of our head, the sage versed in every area of the Torah, famed Dayan (judge), Light of the West, the eminent rabbi from distinguished family, honourable teacher and rabbi Shelomo Abudarham of blessed memory, called to the Heavenly court 4th Heshvan 5565 (December 1804).

== Legacy ==
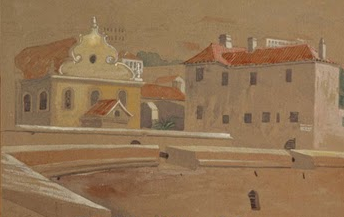
Flemish Synagogue (l) and Bomb House (r), now the Gibraltar Museum

Other than an 1802 decision which dealt with the exemption of Torah scholars from the payment of taxes, fairly little of the rabbi's writings survive. In the early nineteenth century, recent Moroccan immigrants to Gibraltar expressed their desire for a synagogue that was more intimate in scale and less formal than the Great Synagogue. In 1820, the school of religious study that Abudarham had established was converted into a synagogue, the Abudarham Synagogue (Spanish: Esnoga Abudarham). The building on Parliament Lane had formerly been used as the Freemasons' Hall. As a consequence, Parliament Lane is sometimes referred to in Spanish as El Callejón de los Masones (Freemasons' Street). It is speculated that the building housed the municipal council when Gibraltar was in the possession of the Spanish. Both the Flemish Synagogue and the Abudarham Synagogue continue to be active houses of worship for Gibraltar's Jewish community.
