= Abudarham Synagogue =

Orthodox synagogue in Gibraltar

- Ladino: Esnoga Abudarham
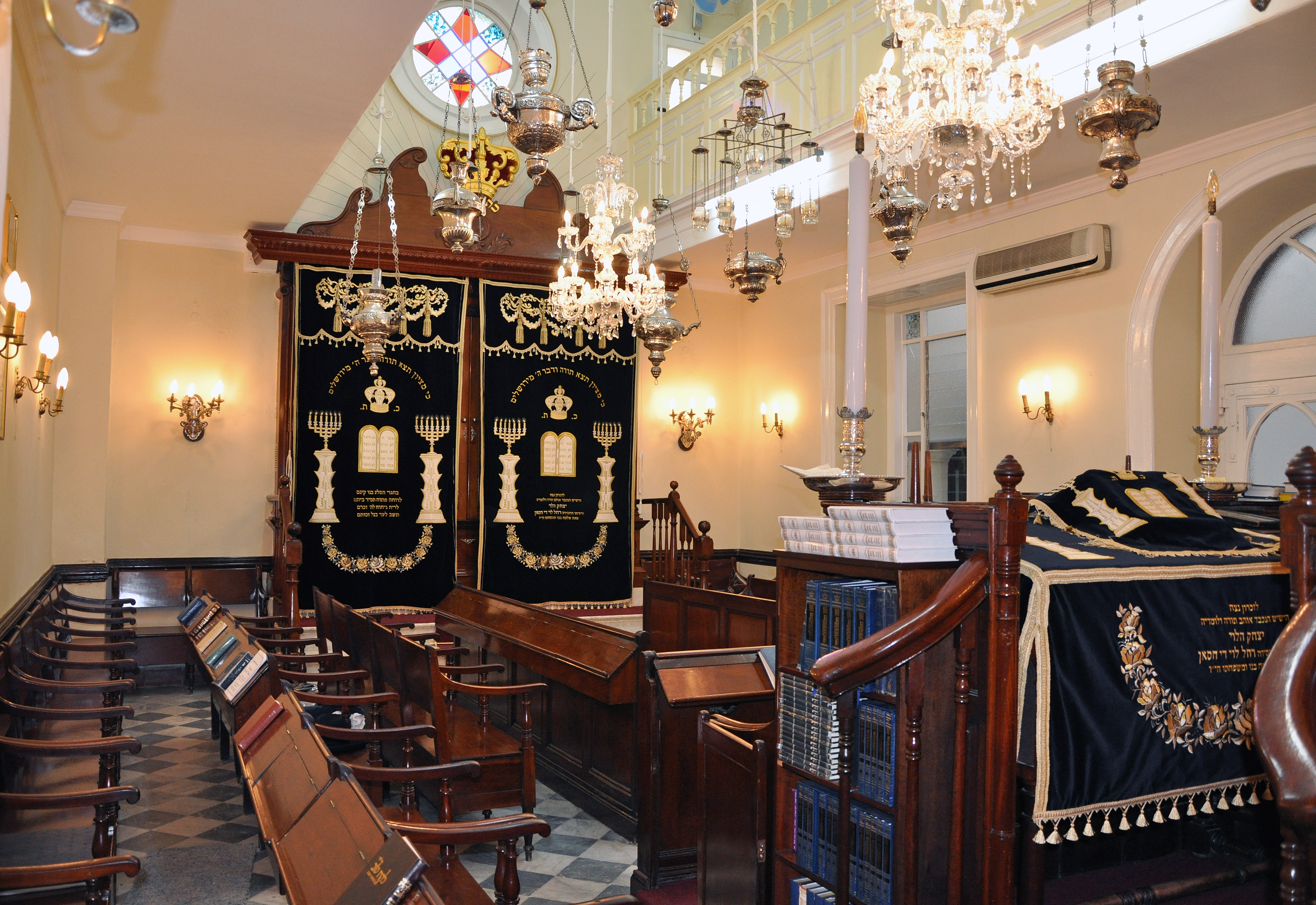
- The synagogue interior

- Location of the synagogue in Gibraltar

Religion
- Affiliation: Orthodox Judaism
- Rite: Nusach Sefard
- Ecclesiastical or organizational status: Synagogue
- Status: Active

Location
- Location: 119 Parliament Lane, Gibraltar, British overseas territories
- Country: United Kingdom
- Interactive map of Abudarham Synagogue
- Coordinates: 36°08′35″N 5°21′13″W

Architecture
- Completed: 1820

The Abudarham Synagogue (Ladino: Esnoga Abudarham) is an Orthodox Jewish congregation and synagogue, located at 19 Parliament Lane, in Gibraltar, a British overseas territory of the United Kingdom.

== History ==
In 1804, Rabbi Solomon Abudarham died in a yellow fever epidemic. The following year, in 1805, Jews represented half of Gibraltar's population. In 1820, the Academy of Rabbi Solomon Abudarham on Parliament Lane was converted into a synagogue by those congregants of The Great Synagogue who were recent immigrants from Morocco and wanted a smaller, more informal setting. Earlier, the building had served as the Freemason's Hall. Accordingly, Parliament Lane is still referred to as Callejon de los Masones.

The Abudarham Synagogue, is a small place of worship with wooden pews that face a bimah, the elevated platform on which the Torah is read.

The Abudarham Synagogue is the fourth and most recent of the active synagogues to be established in Gibraltar.

== See also ==
- History of the Jews in Gibraltar
- List of synagogues in Gibraltar
