= The Little Synagogue =

Orthodox synagogue in Gibraltar

- Ladino: Esnoga Chica
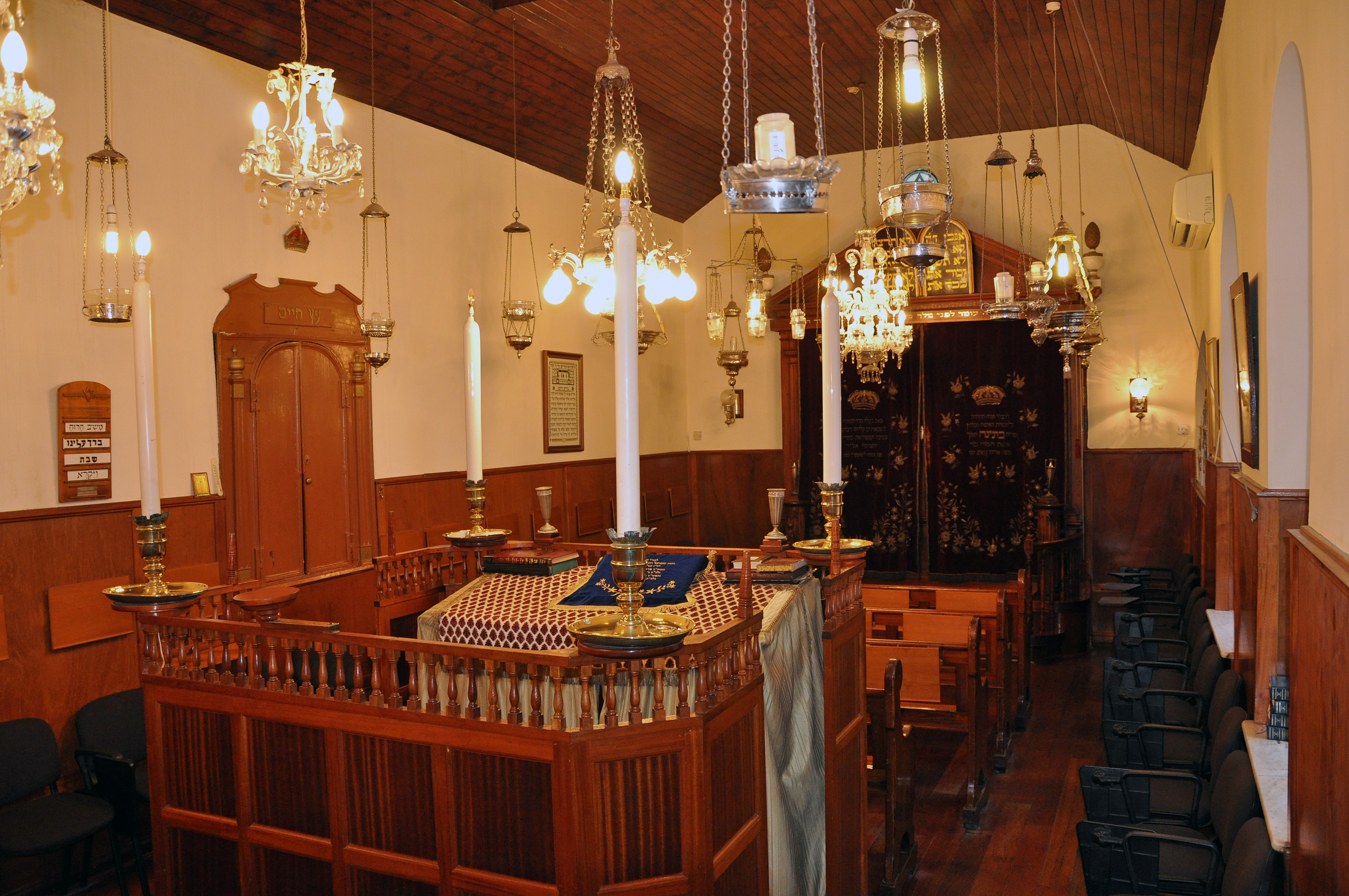
- Little Synagogue, Irish Town interior

- Location of the synagogue in Gibraltar

Religion
- Affiliation: Orthodox Judaism
- Ecclesiastical or organisational status: Synagogue
- Status: Active

Location
- Location: 91 Irish Town, Irish Town, Gibraltar, British overseas territories
- Country: United Kingdom
- Coordinates: 36°08′33″N 5°21′15″W

Architecture
- Established: 1789

Website
- Etz Chaim Website

The Little Synagogue (Ladino: Esnoga Chica), otherwise known as Ets Chaim Synagogue, is an Orthodox Jewish congregation and synagogue, located at 89 Irish Town, in Gibraltar, a British overseas territory of the United Kingdom. The synagogue was established in 1759.

== History ==
Gibraltar had two sets of synagogue customs. Spanish and Portuguese Jews were accustomed to the formality of Christian church services and, therefore, their services tended to be formal. However, in Morocco, Jews were prohibited from building places of worship under shariah law. Subsequently, they were accustomed to meeting in makeshift groups in their own homes and continued to do so in Gibraltar.

They disliked the formal services at The Great Synagogue, which they referred to as the Dutch Synagogue. In 1759, the Yeshivah, a Talmudic Academy, which had been established by Isaac Nieto, was converted into the Little Synagogue for the use of the Moroccan Jews. Its official name is Es Hayim (English: Tree of Life), after the Talmudic Academy in Amsterdam, but is more commonly known as The Little Synagogue. It is believed to have been destroyed during the Great Siege of Gibraltar and later rebuilt.

The synagogue was renovated in 1921.

In 1749, the Jewish population of the island was around 600 people, and this grew, peaking at around 1500 in the 1870s. The number of Jews decreased during World War II as many were evacuated from the island and never returned. The current Jewish population sits at around 750.

Historically the Jewish cemetery of the island was the Jewish Gate Cemetery on Windmill Hill used between 1746 and 1848. The current cemetery is located on Devil's Tower Road.

== See also ==
- History of the Jews in Gibraltar
- List of synagogues in Gibraltar
