= David Abudarham =

14th-century Spanish rabbi

David Abudarham (fl. 1340) (Hebrew: ר׳ דָּוִד אַבּוּדַרְהָם), referred to as Abudarham, Abudraham, or Avudraham, was a rishon who lived in Seville in the 14th century and was known for his commentary on the siddur.

== Biography ==
He is said to have been a student of Jacob ben Asher (son of Asher ben Yechiel). This view originates in Chaim Yosef David Azulai's Shem Gedolim. Abudarham gives full citations of authority up to and including Jacob ben Asher. He also mentions that he lived at Asher ben Jehiel's house, and was a "friend" of Jacob ben Asher. From the article about Abudraham from Wikipedia in French it appears that he is likely a student of Rabbi Asher ben Yehiel instead, since he quotes him quite often, but never Rabbi Jacob ben Asher.

He is believed to be the ancestor of Solomon Abudarham (d. 1804), Chief Rabbi of Gibraltar.

== His work, Sefer Abudarham ==
Abudarham belonged to the class of writers who, in an age of decline, felt the need of disseminating in popular form the knowledge stored up in various sources of rabbinical literature. His book, popularly known as Sefer Abudarham, has no specific title beyond the name חיבור פירוש הברכות והתפילות Ḥibbur Perush haBerakhot vehaTefillot, ("Commentary on the Blessings and Prayers"), probably because it was intended to serve as a running commentary to the liturgy. In the preface he states that he desired to afford the people, whom he found lacking in knowledge, the means of using the liturgy intelligently, and for this purpose he collected, from both the Babylonian and the Jerusalem Talmuds, from the Geonim and all the commentators down to his own time, the material for the explanation of each portion of the prayer-book. In order to elucidate the meaning and origin of each observance connected with divine worship throughout the year, he made use of all the works concerning the rites he could obtain, some of which were very rare. In addition he gave a systematic exposition of the Hebrew calendar, but at the same time, he lays no claim to any originality. He certainly succeeded, as no one did before him, in writing a commentary which is very valuable, if not altogether indispensable, to the student of Jewish ritual.

Though he believed (like most of his contemporaries) in the mystical sense of words and numbers, he combined a fair grammatical knowledge, good common-sense, and a comprehensive rabbinical erudition. Thus, he was better qualified than many of his predecessors to give a satisfactory explanation of almost every phrase of the prayer-book. The work started by Rashi and Meir of Rothenburg, and continued especially in France, Spain, and Germany during the 14th century, found in Abudarham's profound spirituality and wise judgment a fitting conclusion and consummation.

His work quotes frequently from the early work on prayer by Judah ben Yakar.

=== Contents of Sefer Abudarham ===
Three introductory chapters on the reading of the Shema, Shacharit, and the various blessings precede the commentary, which begins with Maariv, and then follows the order of the prayer-book, chiefly of the Sephardic minhag, from beginning to end: first the Daily Morning, Afternoon, and Evening Prayers: then the Shabbat, the Rosh Chodesh, and the Passover Prayers (including the Haggadah). Considerable space is given to the prayers of the Ta'anit in general, besides those of the national fast-days in commemoration of Jerusalem; then follow Rosh Hashanah and Yom Kippur and Sukkot prayers. This section is followed by a chapter on the Hafṭarot, and then follow one on the calendar and a special discourse on the Tequfot and the superstitious belief concerning it.

The last section covers, in nine chapters, the various blessings, for example those recited before and after meals. The closing paragraph quite characteristically contains the rules regarding the cutting of nails, and ends by stating: "This book was completed in Seville in 5100 [1339 CE] after the Creation of the World, by Abudarham." In the manner of an eclectic he frequently states, or suggests, many explanations for one fact; but a certain warmth of religious feeling pervades the whole book and makes it a harmonious unit, giving it an edifying, rather than a merely legal, character.

=== Editions ===
That the work supplied a commonly felt need is shown by its nine editions. The first edition appeared in Lisbon in 1489 (which was reprinted in Morocco as the first printed book in Africa); the second in Constantinople in 1513; the third and fourth in Venice in 1546 and 1566 respectively; the fifth in Amsterdam in 1726 (in this a portion of the calendar was omitted); the sixth and seventh in Prague in 1784 and 1817 respectively; the eighth in Lviv in 1857; and the ninth in Warsaw in 1877. A manuscript exists in the Friedländer Library at Saint Petersburg.
