= Ursula Sternberg-Hertz =

English-German painter

Ursula Sternberg-Hertz (April 12, 1925-2000) was a German-born Jewish painter and textile artist. Her family left Germany in 1936, as the Nazis increased persecution of the Jews. She lived in hiding in the Netherlands and Belgium during World War II, and was self-taught as an artist. Following the war, she lived in England, Canada and the United States.

== Early life ==
Hertz was born to Walter and Dorothea Hertz in Cologne, Germany on April 12, 1925. The family was Jewish, and fled Germany in 1936 when she was eleven because of increasing persecution of Jews by the Nazis. During World War II she and her family went into partial hiding, first in Aerdenhout, Netherlands, then in Naarden, Netherlands, and finally in Belgium. For some of the time in Belgium she was separated from her family, living in a neighbor's attic because her family feared that she looked too Jewish to be seen safely.

Ursula, who had begun drawing and painting when she was six years, was largely self-taught, and developed her colorful artistic style while she was in hiding, Her father created an interim business, selling hand-painted handkerchiefs for soldiers to send back home, and Ursula designed and painted messages and illustrations for them. Walter Hertz had run a women's clothing business before escaping from Germany. He went on to build a new business, Forma, manufacturing bras and bathing suits. Ursula did commercial illustrations for the business.

== England ==
After World War II Ursula moved to England. In 1950, she won third prize in a competition with the Ascher textile firm of London and Paris, established by Zika Ascher. Ursula took a one-year position as a full-time textile designer in London with the Ascher Studio. Following that year, she continued to work as a freelancer with the Ascher textile firm for several years. Other firms she worked for as a commercial artist included Caprice, Franco-Suisse, O.W. Loeb and Peter Pan Foundations.

== Brussels ==
Ursula was visiting her sister Renée in Brussels at the same time that orchestra conductor Jonathan Sternberg happened to be passing through the city. Coincidentally, both were invited to dinner at the home of Renée and Jef Van Hoof. That dinner marked the beginning of a whirlwind romance. On October 15, 1957, Jonathan and Ursula were married in a small service at his parents’ home in New York. They spent a five-month honeymoon in Halifax, Nova Scotia, where Jonathan was scheduled to conduct the Halifax Symphony Orchestra.

During the early part of their marriage, the couple moved from place to place depending on Jonathan's professional appointments. While Jonathan conducted the Royal Flemish Opera in Antwerp, the couple lived in Brussels, where their children Tanya and Peter were born.

== United States ==
In 1966, Jonathan became music director of the Harkness Ballet in New York and the family moved to New York. After living in Rochester, New York, and Atlanta, Georgia, the family settled in Elkins Park, Pennsylvania in 1971, near Philadelphia, where Jonathan worked at Temple University. In 1989 the family moved to the Chestnut Hill neighborhood of Philadelphia.

As well as thousands of drawings and paintings, Ursula created "visual diaries", sketchbooks that documented her daily life in words and images. Beginning in the 1960s, Ursula became increasingly well known as a fine artist. Her first professional art exhibit was in 1962, at the Galerie Le Cheval de Verre (the Glass Horse Gallery) in Brussels. She exhibited in both Europe and the United States. Her work was acquired by places including Duke University, New York Public Library, Victoria and Albert Museum, and the Woodmere Art Museum.
