= Asher (disambiguation) =

Asher is a character in the Book of Genesis.

Asher may also refer to:

- Tribe of Asher, one of the biblical Twelve Tribes of Israel, founded by Asher
- Asher (name), a given name and surname
- Asher, Oklahoma, a town
- Asher Creek, a stream in Missouri, U.S.
- Asher Space Research Institute, a research center in Israel
- Asher Guitars & Lap Steels, a guitar manufacturer
- Asher (film)

== See also ==
- Ashers, a locality in New Zealand and named after William Asher
