= Jews' Gate Cemetery =

Jewish Cemetery in Gibraltar

- Interactive map of Jews' Gate Cemetery

Details
- Established: 1746
- Location: Gibraltar
- Coordinates: 36.1205°N 5.3454°W
- Type: Jewish

Jews' Gate Cemetery is a Jewish cemetery located on Windmill Hill within a nature reserve in the British Overseas Territory of Gibraltar. Also known as the Windmill Hill Cemetery, it is the site of the earliest known Jewish burials in Gibraltar. The cemetery opened by 1746 and closed in 1848. It is the burial site of a number of Gibraltar's Chief Rabbis. The graveyard is protected by the law of Gibraltar.

== History ==
Jews' Gate Cemetery, also known as the Windmill Hill Cemetery, is located on Windmill Hill near the southern entrance to the Upper Rock Nature Reserve on the Rock of Gibraltar. It is positioned along Queen's Road, southeast of its junction with Engineer Road. That is also the location of the Pillars of Hercules Monument which depicts "The Ancient World" (see below). The earliest known Jewish burials in Gibraltar are located within the cemetery and date back to 1746. The cemetery closed for burials on 6 May 1848. A letter dated 31 May 1848 from the Colonial Secretary indicated that: "The Governor has given conclusive orders that no more interments shall take place at the former Burial Ground above Wind Mill Hill but that all future Hebrew dead shall be deposited in the allotted portion of the New Cemetery."

The reason for this location for burials of members of the Jewish community is uncertain. One theory is that the more visible and accessible cemetery utilised by Christians, near the border with Spain, was more subject to the laws regarding expulsion of Jews, which had been mandated by the 1713 Treaty of Utrecht. The best-preserved gravestones at Jews' Gate Cemetery are those that, until recently, were protected by a layer of mud and peat. The inscriptions on the limestone tombstones that have been exposed to the elements have become difficult to decipher. During half of the year, the winter and spring, plants are allowed to grow freely in the cemetery to support the abundant nature of the area. The ecology of the area is monitored by the Gibraltar Ornithological and Natural History Society. The area is a favoured mating and nesting ground of the Barbary partridge.

== Burials ==
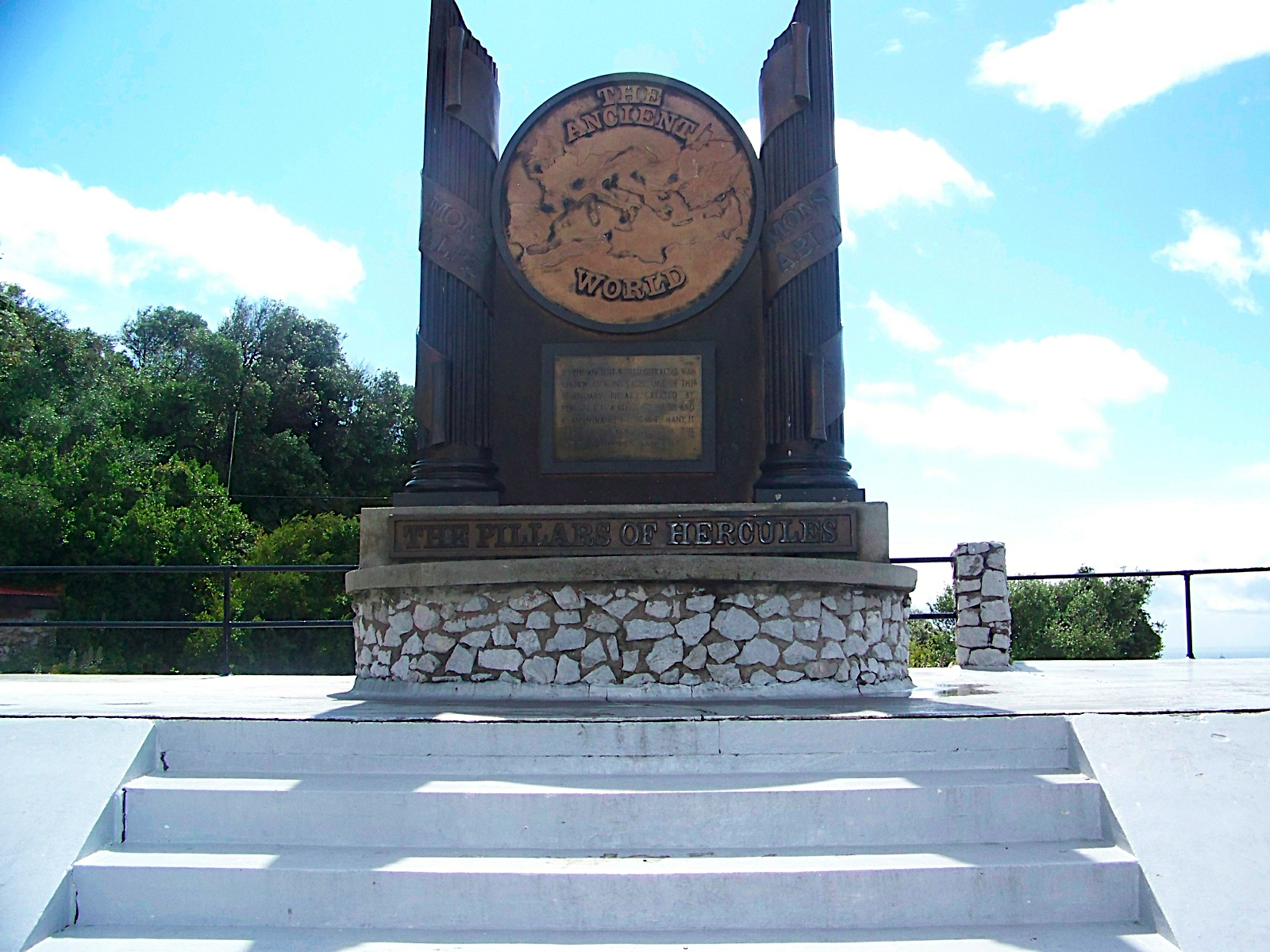
The Pillars of Hercules Monument by Jews' Gate Cemetery in Gibraltar.

Within the centre of the cemetery is a stone wall 1.5 metres (4.9 ft) in height which encloses the burial sites of ten to twelve of Gibraltar's Judges of Religious Law. The oldest tomb of the Tsadikim (Righteous people) within the enclosure, at the far left, is that of Chief Rabbi Solomon Abudarham. He succeeded Rabbi Yehuda ben Yitshak Halevi as Gibraltar's Chief Rabbi. Abudarham inaugurated the Flemish Synagogue on Line Wall Road at the turn of the 19th century, laying the stone which still bears his name. He also established a school of religious study in Parliament Lane. Abudarham died in 1804, victim of a yellow fever epidemic. In 1820, the Academy of Rabbi Solomon Abudarham on Parliament Lane was converted into the Abudarham Synagogue. The inscription on his gravestone reads:

Tomb of the crown of our head, the sage versed in every area of the Torah, famed Dayan (judge), Light of the West, the eminent rabbi from distinguished family, honourable teacher and rabbi Shelomo Abudarham of blessed memory, called to the Heavenly court 4th Heshvan 5565 (December 1804).

The second oldest tombstone is the third from the left. The grave is that of Rabbi Raphael Moshe Hassan, who died in 1810. His inscription is also legible and reads:

Tomb of our master, teacher and rabbi, a sage complete in his knowledge of all areas of Tora, Dayan and teacher, pious and humble, his honour our teacher and rabbi Raphael Moshe Hassan, of blessed memory, called to the Heavenly Court …5th Adar 1 year 5570 from the creation (1810).

The fifth tomb from the left in the enclosure is that of Rabbi Avraham Haim Burgel, the son of Rabbi Nathan Burgel, author of Hok Natan. The younger Burgel died in 1813. His epitaph is:

The tomb of the sage versed in all areas of the Tora, our honourable teacher and rabbi Abraham Hayim Burgel, son of that Tsadik the rabbi "Hok Natan" of blessed memory, and his repose was on Wednesday 22nd Elul 5573 (1813).

Rabbi Yeshaya Anahory also died in 1813, shortly after Rabbi Burgel. His tomb is within the far right of the walled enclosure. His inscription has been transcribed as:

This is the tomb of the sage in all areas of Tora, the famed judge, the pious and humble honourable teacher and Rabbi Yeshaya Anahory of blessed memory, and his repose was in honour on 6th Tishri 5574 (1813).

The gravestone second from the left is that of Rabbi Yosef Elmalech ben Ayush. He first served as a rabbi in Morocco in 1788, and later accepted the position of Dayan (rabbinical judge) in Gibraltar, and remained there until his death in 1823. The fourth gravestone from the left is that of Rabbi Avraham Yisrael who died in 1844.

In the southern portion of the cemetery is a smaller enclosure with just a single grave, that of Rabbi Yisrael ben Yeshaya who died in 1841. After his death, the position of Chief Rabbi in Gibraltar remained open for four decades. Adjacent to the wall surrounding the rabbi's tomb, is that of Rabbi Yitshak Halevi III. He died in 1847, the year before the cemetery's closing. By then, there was little remaining space in the graveyard, which would make sense of the south-north orientation of his tomb, compared to the east-west alignment of other graves. Another grave within Jews' Gate Cemetery is that of Rabbi Raphael Hayyim Moses Benaim.

== Gibraltar Heritage Trust ==
In 1989, the Gibraltar Heritage Trust designated the Jews' Gate Cemetery on Windmill Hill as a Category A Listed Building on Schedule 1, as noted in the Gibraltar Heritage Trust Act.
