= Peach (singer) =

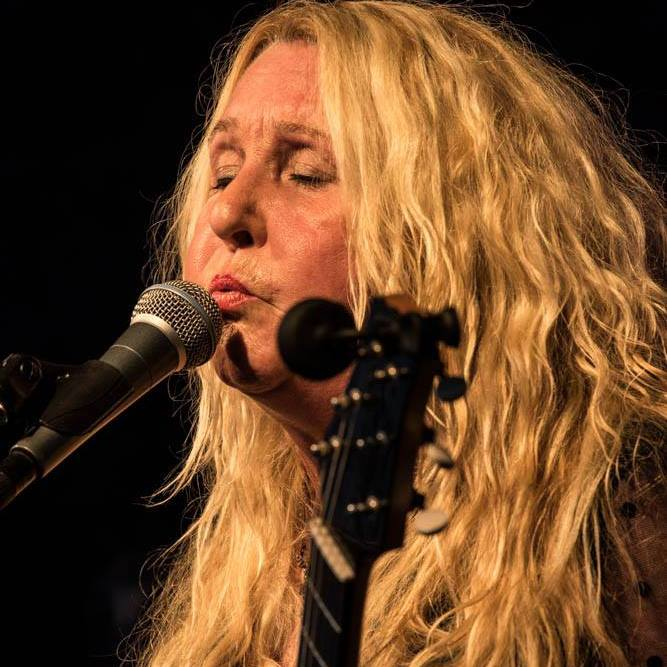
- Peach singing at a performance in 2015

Background information
- Also known as: Peach Reasoner
- Born: Patricia Elaine Reasoner; June 1, 1951 (age 75); Anderson, Indiana, U.S.
- Genres: Blues; Jazz
- Occupations: singer songwriter guitarist producer
- Instruments: vocals guitar
- Years active: 1967–present
- Label: Blues Rock Records
- Website: http://www.peachmusic.com/

Peach (born Patricia Elaine Reasoner; June 1, 1951) is an American blues and jazz artist – singer, songwriter, and guitarist, and producer. She currently resides in Venice, California, United States.

== Early life ==
Peach was born and raised in Anderson, Indiana. She grew up listening to the music of Ella Fitzgerald, Aretha Franklin, Billie Holiday, and Bessie Smith. At age 6 she started singing in her church choir, and at age 11 got her first electric guitar

== Career ==
By the age of 16, Peach was playing professionally. She was an accomplished guitarist and toured throughout the Midwest, playing at universities and coffeehouses.

She attended the University of Denver music school (1969–1973) where she was the featured vocalist for the university's jazz band. As a voice major, she was accompanied by Condoleezza Rice, former national security advisor and secretary of state in the George W. Bush administration.

After college, Peach moved to San Francisco and played with funk and jazz musicians Smith Dobson, Russell Ferrante (Yellowjackets), Davis Ramey (George Shearing), and Jim Nichols (Robben Ford). She later toured Japan as a solo jazz musician, then returned to the U.S. and played with Jim Messina of Loggins and Messina.

Peach moved to Los Angeles and began recording under her own Blues Rock Records label. Her first release in 2001, The Cure for You, is an album featuring five of her own songs. The album and her live performances led to her being awarded the L.A. Music Awards Blues Artist of the Year 2001.

In 2002, Peach followed up with the album, Live From Riverside, a 7-track album recorded live in Riverside, California during 'Concerts at the Courthouse' with special guest Joey Delgado (Delgado Brothers). The album and her live performances resulted in her winning two 2002 L.A. Music Awards: the Award of Excellence and Most Successful Independent Distribution.

Peach continued performing and recording, releasing The Real Thing in 2004, a 13-track album featuring a title song duet with blues legend Taj Mahal and with James Gadson on drums throughout. As with her other releases, the album gained award recognition, this time as L.A. Music Awards Independent Blues Album of the Year (2004).

Her performances and popularity grew, yielding several awards over the next few years: South Bay Music Awards Artist of the Year (2006), Rockwired Best Female Artist (2007), and All-Access Best Blues Group / Artist (2007).

In 2009, Peach co-wrote a song with Keb' Mo' titled It Meant Nothing. The song is yet to be released as an official audio recording, however, Peach does perform it and video recordings of live performances exist online.

Peach took to theater in 2011, performing as producer (Reasoner Productions) for the acclaimed show Hoboken to Hollywood. Her production was awarded the 32nd annual L.A. Weekly Theater Awards – Musical of the Year 2011.

In addition to her own work, PEACH has recorded with other artists including, Marty Grebb (The Buckinghams), Reggie McBride (Elton John), Garth Hudson (The Band) and Paul Barrere (Little Feat).

In 2015, Peach traveled to Copenhagen, Denmark and began performing there. She toured with The Almost Blues Band [Helge Solberg (DNK), Michael Engman Rønnow (DNK), Niclas Campagnol (DNK), Ken Stange (USA)] in October 2015, and returned in February 2016 and June 2016 for more concerts with the band. A live recording was made of their February 2016 Café Bartof performances and it was subsequently released as an 8-track audio cd, A Night in Copenhagen, August 9, 2016.

In 2018, Peach teamed up with Jamie James (The Harry Dean Stanton Band, The Kingbees, Steppenwolf, Dennis Quaid and the Sharks) in a new band, Mandeville, as a featured artist along with her daughter, Gina Segall. Mandeville performed at The Green Lantern Bar in Lexington, Kentucky, as part of the Harry Dean Stanton Fest film festival.

Peach is a notable user of guitars made by Asher Guitars (Bill Asher) (T-Deluxe tele-style guitar with Curtis Novak pickups, ResoSonic Rambler (Electric Dobro) with Rambler Hubcap resonator), pedals made by Bill Finnegan of Klon Centaur, and vintage Fender Super Reverb amp.

=== Recordings ===
- The Cure for You, 2001
- Live From Riverside, 2002
- The Real Thing, 2004
- Merry Christmas Baby, 2006 (released DEC 2016)
- "Git Gone" (track #10) on Henhouse Studios Anthology 3 from Hen House Studios (February 25, 2003)
- A Night in Copenhagen, 2016 (released August 9, 2016)
- Romantic Junkie, 2026 (released June 19, 2026)

=== Awards ===
2001

- L.A. Music Awards Blues Artist of the Year

2002

L.A. Music Awards: Award of Excellence

- L.A. Music Awards: Most Successful Independent Distribution.

2004

- L.A. Music Awards: Independent Blues Album of the Year – The Real Thing / Blues Rock Records

2006

- South Bay Music Awards: Artist of the Year

2007

- Rockwired Magazine: Best Female Artist
- All-Access Music Awards: Best Blues Group / Artist

2011

- 32nd annual L.A. Weekly Theater Awards – Musical of the Year – Hoboken to Hollywood / Peach Reasoner / Reasoner Productions

2016

- Doc's Blues Awards: Best Live Album – A Night in Copenhagen
- L.A. Music Critic Award: Best Live Album – A Night in Copenhagen

2017

- Rockwired Magazine: Best Female Artist

== Personal life ==
Peach was married from 1986 to 2009. She has one daughter, Gina Michelle Segall (b. 1994), who sang the lead track in the movie, “The Ring" (2002), and who occasionally sings duets with her mom on tour.

Peach has one sister, Lois Jean Manis, who lives in their home state of Indiana.

Peach studied Judaism at the University of Judaism and officially converted in June 1997.

Peach's hobbies include studying languages: Japanese, Latin, French, Danish, Spanish.
