= History of the Jews in Gibraltar =

Gibraltarian Jews Judios gibraltareños יהודים גיברלטרים
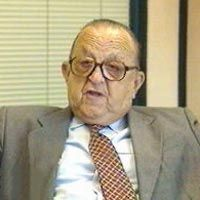
Sir Joshua Hassan GBE KCMG LVO QC

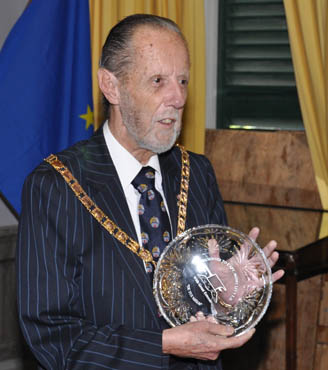
Solomon Levy, MBE JP

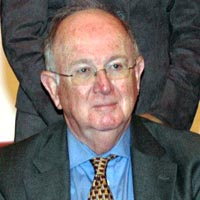
Sam Benady, MBE

Total population
- 885

Languages
- English, Spanish, Llanito, Hebrew, Ladino, Haketia, Judeo-Moroccan Arabic

Religion
- Judaism

Related ethnic groups
- Sephardi Jews, Moroccan Jews, Anglo-Israelis

The location of Gibraltar (dark green, in box) in Europe

The history of the Jews in Gibraltar dates from the fourteenth century. Despite periods of persecution, for the most part the Jews of Gibraltar have prospered and been one of the largest religious minorities in the city, where they have made contributions to the culture, defence, and the government.

Significantly, the Jews of Gibraltar have faced almost no official anti-Semitism during their time in the city. During Gibraltar's tercentenary celebration, Jonathan Sacks, the Chief Rabbi of the United Kingdom of Great Britain and Northern Ireland and Commonwealth, was quoted as saying, "In the dark times of expulsion and inquisition, Gibraltar lit the beacon of tolerance," and that Gibraltar "is probably the community where Jews have been the most integrated."

== History ==
=== Early history to 1492 ===
The first record of Jews in Gibraltar comes from the year 1356, under Muslim rule, when the community issued an appeal asking for the ransom of a group of Jews taken captive by barbary pirates. In 1474, twelve years after the Christian takeover, the Duke of Medina Sidonia, sold Gibraltar to a group of Jewish conversos from Cordova and Seville led by Pedro de Herrera in exchange for maintaining the garrison of the town for two years, after which time the 4,350 Jews were expelled by the Duke. Their fate is unknown. It is likely that many returned to Cordova where they had to face the persecution of the Inquisition under the infamous Torquemada from 1488.

Jews were expelled from Spain under the Alhambra decree of 1492 and from Portugal by order of King Manuel I in 1497, effectively ending all Jewish activity there, except in the cases of conversos or possible Crypto-Jews.

During the 18th century, much of the rations of the British military forces were beef and pork. Barrels of salted meat were provided by England and Ireland. However, in order to avoid scurvy, fresh provisions had to be procured for soldiers after a few months of salted or cured food. For soldiers stationed in Gibraltar, Morocco was the most convenient location to obtain fresh beef, although pork was not available from the Muslim country. Subsequently, starting in the early 18th century, after the 1704 capture of Gibraltar, Jewish merchants from Tetuan in Morocco were encouraged to come to Gibraltar with provisions.

=== British rule ===
From about 1705, Jews met in private houses or in a warehouse in what is now Bomb House Lane. Some consider that warehouse on what was known as La Calle que va a la Plazuela de Juan Serrano to be Gibraltar's first synagogue founded under British rule.

After the Treaty of Utrecht in 1713, Gibraltar came under the rule of the Kingdom of Great Britain, which made the area a British dependency. Spain insisted on language in the Treaty that excluded Jews and Moors from Gibraltar:

Her Britannic Majesty, at the request of the Catholic King, does consent and agree that no leave shall be given, under any pretext whatsoever, either to Jews or Moors to reside or have their dwellings in the said town of Gibraltar.

However, the British ignored this provision. Although the Jews had been expelled from England in 1290, Oliver Cromwell had consented to their readmission in 1655. The admission of Jews was one of the infractions against the Treaty of Utrecht that the Spanish used (Note: Other infractions were the admission of Moors, the extension of fortifications, and the alleged smuggling from Gibraltar.) to consider that the British had abrogated the Treaty. Attempts to have the clause deleted were unsuccessful.

In 1716, supplies began to arrive over the border with Spain, but the Spanish ambassador complained that there were substantial numbers of Jews living in Gibraltar, in violation of the terms of the treaty. The British government insisted that the Lieutenant-Governor of Gibraltar adhere to the terms of the 1713 treaty, and Jews were expelled from Gibraltar in 1717. However, under the terms of the Treaty of Utrecht, Spain lost Sardinia and Sicily. Despite that, in 1717, the same year as the expulsion of Jews from Gibraltar, Spain dispatched an expedition to recover Sardinia and Sicily. European countries, finally having peace after the War of the Spanish Succession, responded to Spain's actions by declaring war. Provisions no longer came across the border with Spain; accordingly, Jews were again allowed in Gibraltar so that supplies from Morocco would resume.

In 1721, a reciprocal treaty was negotiated with the Sultan of Morocco, Ismail Ibn Sharif, allowing both Jews and Muslims to settle in Gibraltar, and Englishmen to reside in Barbary (Morocco):

The subjects of the Emperor of Fez and Morocco, whether Moors or Jews, residing in the dominion of the King of Great Britain, shall entirely enjoy the same privileges that are granted to the English residing in Barbary.

In 1726, Spain claimed that Britain had violated the terms of the 1713 Treaty of Utrecht, and used that as a pretext for unsuccessfully attacking Gibraltar. The siege lasted for several months in 1727.

In 1729, the British and the Sultan reached an agreement whereby the Sultan's Jewish subjects were legally permitted to reside in the colony. Subsequent treaties with Morocco limited the stay of Jews and Muslims to three months. However, this was ignored by the Governors of Gibraltar. Jews were given the right to permanent settlement in 1749, when Isaac Nieto, the new community's first rabbi, came to the colony from London and established congregation Sha'ar HaShamayim, the oldest synagogue in Gibraltar, otherwise known as the Great Synagogue. At that date there were already 600 Jews in Gibraltar, who constituted one third of the civilian population. By 1777, 863 Jews lived in Gibraltar, three quarters of whom were natives of the country. The Jewish population in Gibraltar peaked in the 19th century. By 1805, they represented half of the population. By 1878, there were 1,533 Jews residing in Gibraltar.

Three more synagogues were built as years went by, Nefusot Yehuda Synagogue and The Little Synagogue in 1781, as well as the Abudarham Synagogue in 1820, named after Solomon Abudarham. The Jewish population continued to grow, reaching its peak in the mid-19th century.

The Jews of Gibraltar initially preserved some old customs. For example, in 1777, Issac Aboab, a Gibraltarian Jew born in Tetuan, was listed as having two wives, Hannah Aboab and Simah Aboab. Bigamy was illegal in the Kingdom of Great Britain at the time, but the law was apparently not fully operative in Gibraltar, and though polygamy had been banned by Rabbenu Gershom Meor Hagola since approximately 1000 CE, this ban was only accepted by Ashkenazi communities.

=== Twentieth century and today ===
Tito Benady, a historian on Gibraltar Jewry, noted that when some 200 Jews of the 2000 evacuees from Gibraltar were evacuated as non combatants to Funchal, Madeira, at the start of World War II, they found a Jewish cemetery (Jewish Cemetery of Funchal) that belonged to the Abudarham family. The same family after whom the Abudarham Synagogue in Gibraltar was named.

On the 28 May 1944 the first repatriation party departed Madeira for Gibraltar and by the end of 1944 only 520 non-priority evacuees remained on the island.

In 2008, a monument was made in Gibraltar and shipped to Madeira, where it has been erected next to a small chapel at Santa Caterina park, Funchal. The monument is a gift and symbol of ever-lasting thanks given by the people of Gibraltar to the island of Madeira and its inhabitants.

The city of Funchal and Gibraltar were twinned on 13 May 2009 by their then Mayors, the Mayor of Funchal Miguel Albuquerque and the Mayor of Gibraltar who had been an Evacuee from Gibraltar to Madeira Solomon Levy, respectively. The Mayor of Gibraltar then had a meeting with the then President of Madeira Alberto João Jardim.

Most of Gibraltar's Jews were evacuated to the United Kingdom during the Second World War, when the Allies used Gibraltar as a base of operations. Some Jews opted to stay in the United Kingdom, but most returned, although there was a slackening in some of their religious practices. The efforts of the Spanish sephardic Italian born Rabbi Josef Pacifici, who assumed the Gibraltar rabbinate and took control of Jewish education in Gibraltar, helped reverse this tendency. In 1984 Rabbi Ron Hassid became Chief Rabbi.

Several Gibraltarian Jews have served in important positions in the Government there in the 20th century, particularly Sir Joshua Hassan, who served as Chief Minister of Gibraltar for two separate terms. Solomon Levy served in the ceremonial role of Mayor of Gibraltar from 2008 to 2009. The city maintains five kosher institutions, a Jewish primary school and two Jewish secondary schools. In 2004, at a celebration of the 300 years since the British takeover, the congregants at the Great Synagogue (Shaar Hashamayim) performed the anthem "God Save the Queen" in Hebrew, the first time that has occurred officially.

Like the rest of the civilian population, the Jews were evacuated during World War II. By early 1943, over 1,500 Gibraltar Jews were refugees in Jamaica, according to the British government. Some of the population ended up in camps in Jamaica, where the diet was sometimes less than optimal and there were misunderstandings with Jews who were sent there as refugees from Nazi-occupied Europe. Some never returned to Gibraltar after the cessation of hostilities. In addition, in 1967, Francisco Franco closed the border with Spain after a referendum in which Gibraltar's residents expressed their desire to remain British. The border didn't completely reopen until 1985. The population dwindled during the twentieth century. However, the Jewish population has again begun to grow, and now numbers about 750, approximately 2% of Gibraltar's residents. The years between 2008 and 2011 were remarkable for a nearly 25% increase in the size of Gibraltar's Jewish community. Mark Benady, vice president of Gibraltar's Jewish community, is of the opinion that the area's infrastructure, including its four synagogues, could support a community of 2,000.

On the Gibraltar Tourist Board map at the city center, each synagogue is indicated by a prominent Star of David. All of Gibraltar's synagogues are proponents of Orthodox Judaism. The Chief Rabbi of Gibraltar is Rabbi Ron Hassid, who has presided over all four synagogues. In 2010, he was joined in Gibraltar by Rabbi Rafael Bitan, a native of Manchester. Bitan, a Rabbinical judge, serves as the headmaster of the Jewish community's schools.

In December 2004, Jonathan Sacks, Chief Rabbi of the United Kingdom and Commonwealth, spoke at a service in the Great Synagogue which commemorated the 300th anniversary of the victory of the Anglo-Dutch fleet at Gibraltar. The occasion, which also served as a celebration of Gibraltar as a haven for Jews, featured the anthem God Save the Queen sung in Hebrew. In 2010, the Gibraltar Jewish Community Organisation celebrated the 95th anniversary of the founding of their organisation.

== Historical demographics ==
In 1753, when the first census was taken, the Jewish population of Gibraltar was 575 out of about 1,800 civilian inhabitants. The count had risen to 863 by 1777. In 1787 the population had fallen to 776. By 1830 the civilian population was evaluated to 1,900, of which 1,300 were "native" Jews and 600 recent Jewish immigrants, and by 1878 the community counted 1,533 members.

In 2001, there were 584 Jews (roughly 2% of the total population), of whom 464 were self-described Gibraltarian, 63 were "Other British", 4 were Moroccan and 18 Spanish. Five Jews came from other European Union countries, and 39 did not hail from Gibraltar, the United Kingdom, Morocco, Spain, or any other countries in the European Union. Presently a large percentage of Gibraltar's Jews are Sephardic, but there are a number of British Jews as well.

== Language ==
Languages spoken in the Jewish community include English, Spanish, Ladino (spoken by the large Sephardic population) and Arabic (traditionally spoken by some of the population which traces its origins back to Morocco).

Llanito, the vernacular language for the majority of Gibraltarians, has significant Jewish influence. Some 500 words are of Hebrew origin, and the language also has features of influence from Haketia, a Judeo-Spanish language spoken by the Sephardic communities of Northern Morocco and the Spanish exclaves of Ceuta and Melilla.

== Gallery ==
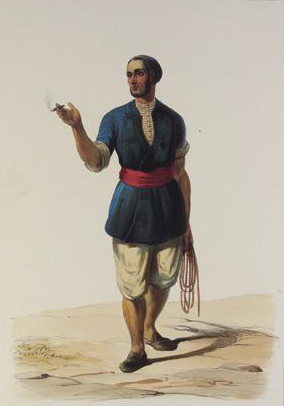
Typical dress of a Jew in Gibraltar in the 19th century

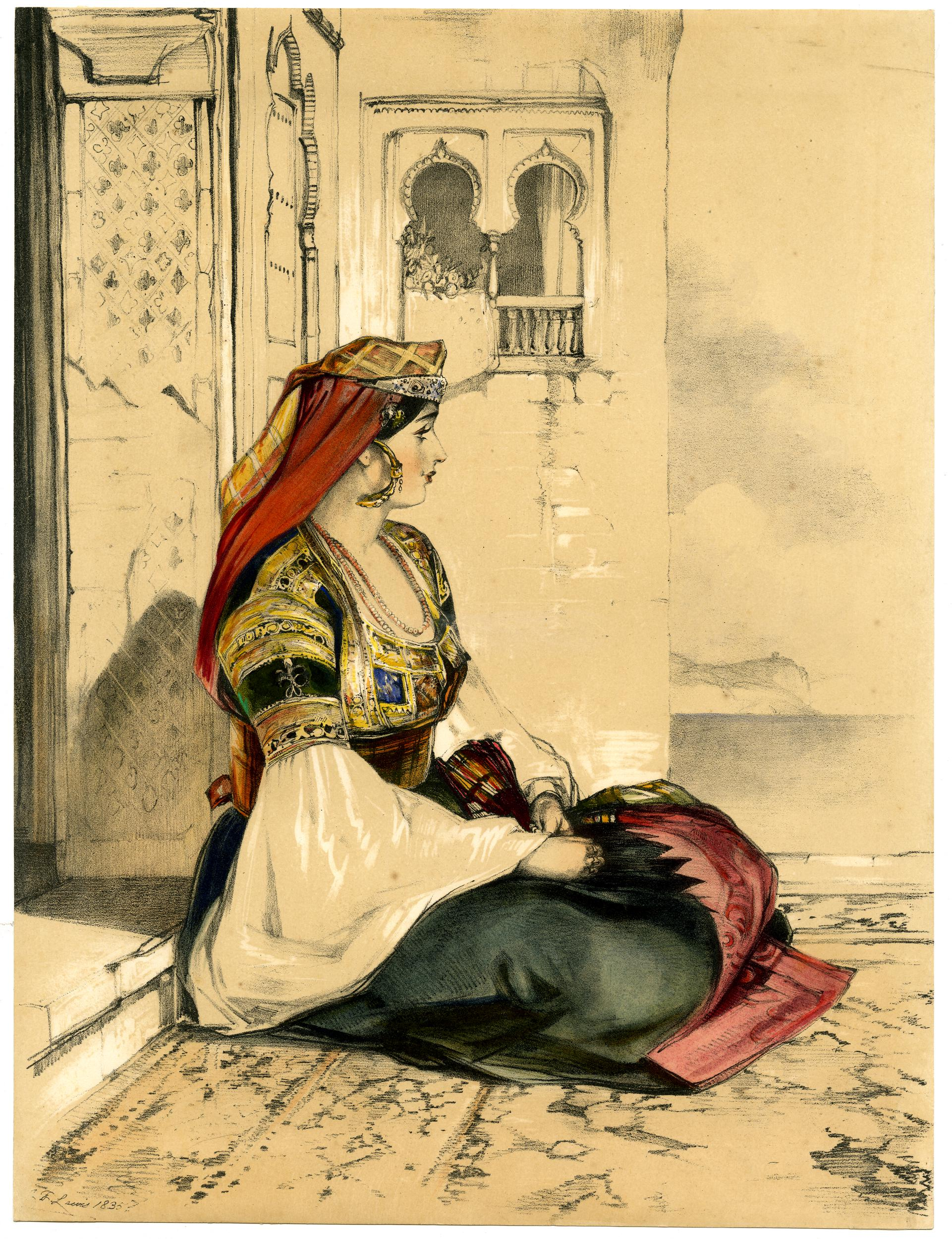
Jewish woman of Gibraltar in fiesta dress, 1835

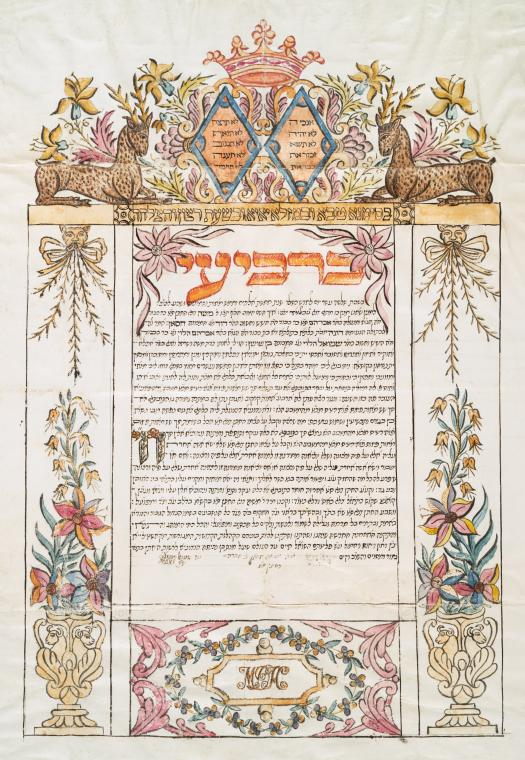
1826 ketubah from Gibraltar

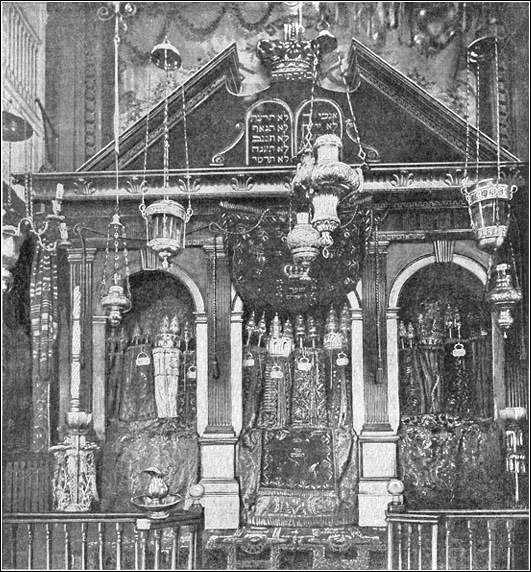
The Ark in a Gibraltar synagogue, showing a large number of Sefer Torahs

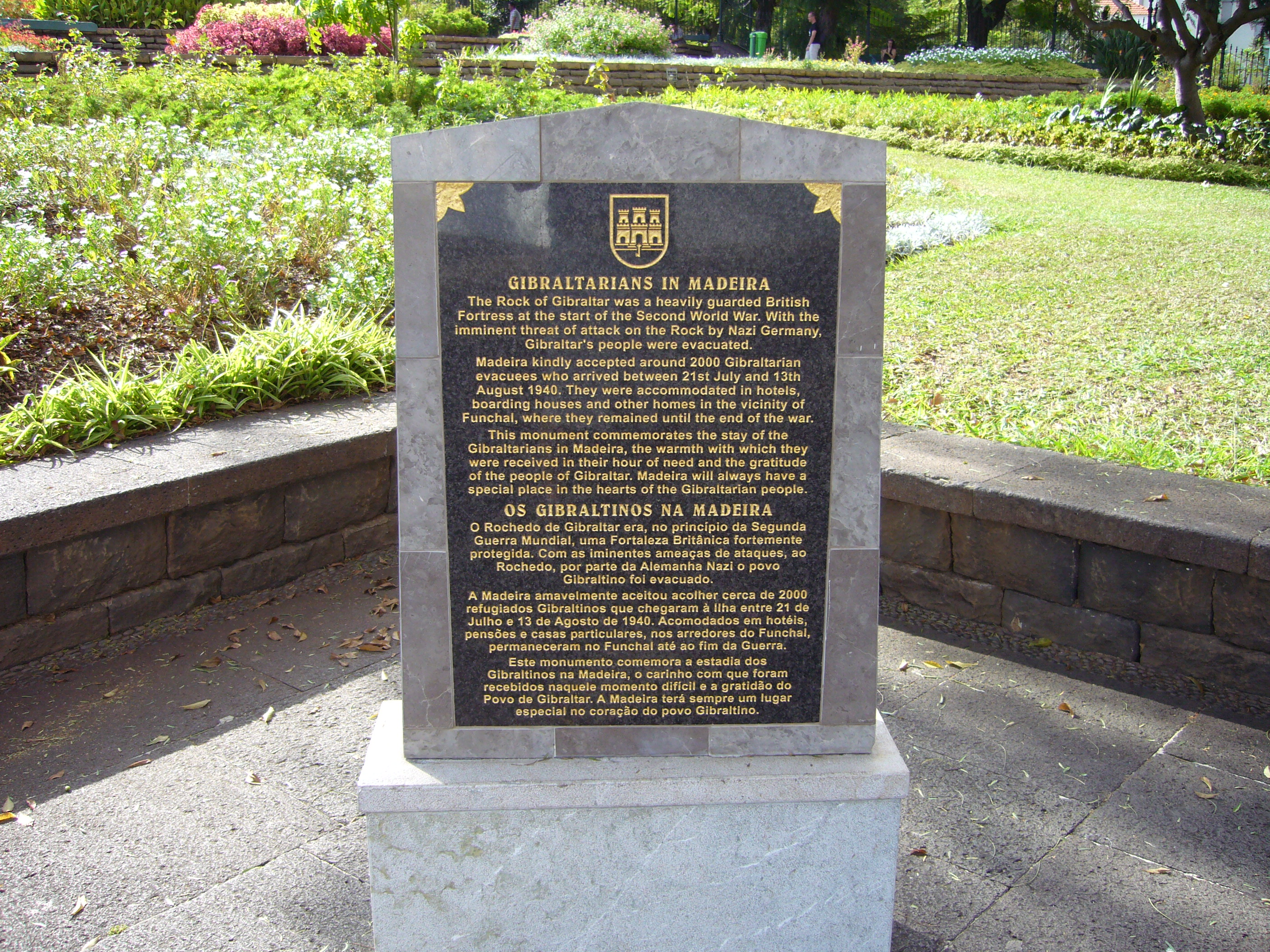
Memorial commemorating Gibraltarian evacuees in Madeira

== See also ==
- List of synagogues in Gibraltar
- Jews' Gate Cemetery
