= Usher =

Usher commonly refers to:

- Usher (occupation), a person who welcomes and shows people where to sit
  - Church usher
  - Wedding usher, one of the male attendants to the groom in a wedding ceremony
  - Field usher, a military rank
  - Usher of Justice, a judicial official in some countries
  - Usher of the Black Rod, a parliamentary official in the UK, Australia, Canada and New Zealand
  - Gentleman Usher, a category of royal official in the United Kingdom
  - White House Chief Usher
  - Usher (Switzerland), a largely ceremonial function in Swiss federal, cantonal, and local governments
  - An assistant to a head teacher or schoolmaster (generally obsolete); see Usher (occupation) § History

Usher may also refer to:

== People ==
- Usher (musician) (born 1978), American R&B recording artist, performer, and actor
- Usher Komugisha, Ugandan sports journalist and commentator
- Usher (surname), a list of people

== Places ==
- Usher, Western Australia
- Mount Usher, Antarctica
- Usher Glacier, South Shetland Islands
- Usher Hall, Edinburgh, Scotland
- Ushers, New York, a hamlet in Saratoga County, New York

== Media ==
- Usher, a 2002 short film directed by Curtis Harrington
- Usher (film), a film based on the short story by Poe
- Usher (album), the 1994 debut album by the singer of the same name
- The family name in the Edgar Allan Poe short story "The Fall of the House of Usher"
  - The Fall of the House of Usher (disambiguation), adaptations of Poe's work

== Other uses ==
- Gentleman Usher of an order of knights in the United Kingdom
- Usher 1C, a human gene
- Usher syndrome, a genetic disorder
- Ushers of Trowbridge, a former English brewery
- Usher baronets, a title in the Baronetage of the United Kingdom
- Usher (fragrance)

== See also ==
- Ussher
