= Ascher: Fabric, Art, Fashion =

1987 art catalog

- Author: Zika Ascher
- Language: English
- Genre: Non Fiction, Art, Textile Design, Fashion Design
- Publisher: Victoria and Albert Museum, Faber and Faber
- Publication date: 1987
- Publication place: United Kingdom

Ascher: Fabric, Art, Fashion is an illustrated catalog published by the Victoria and Albert Museum surveying the textile work of husband-and-wife team Zika Ascher and Lida Ascher. It was issued as the catalogue for a V&A Museum exhibition of the same name held from April to June 1987.

The Aschers operated a London textile firm from the 1940s that became known for commissioning designs from contemporary artists. The book traces the history of the firm, drawing on its photographs, records, letters and contemporary fashion coverage. The catalogue documents designs from Henri Matisse, Henry Moore, Graham Sutherland, John Piper, Alexander Calder, André Derain, and Christian Bérard, among others. These designs were printed on scarves and dress fabrics; the firm's headscarves and a series of wall hangings produced with Matisse and Moore are among the works discussed. The catalogue contains about one hundred illustrations that are similar to the fashion photography in magazines like Harper's Bazaar.

The exhibition was curated by Valerie Mendes, who contributed to the catalogue together with Frances Hinchcliffe. The exhibition was previewed in the May 1987 issue of Vogue. The book was reviewed in Library Journal, Choice and The Spectator.
