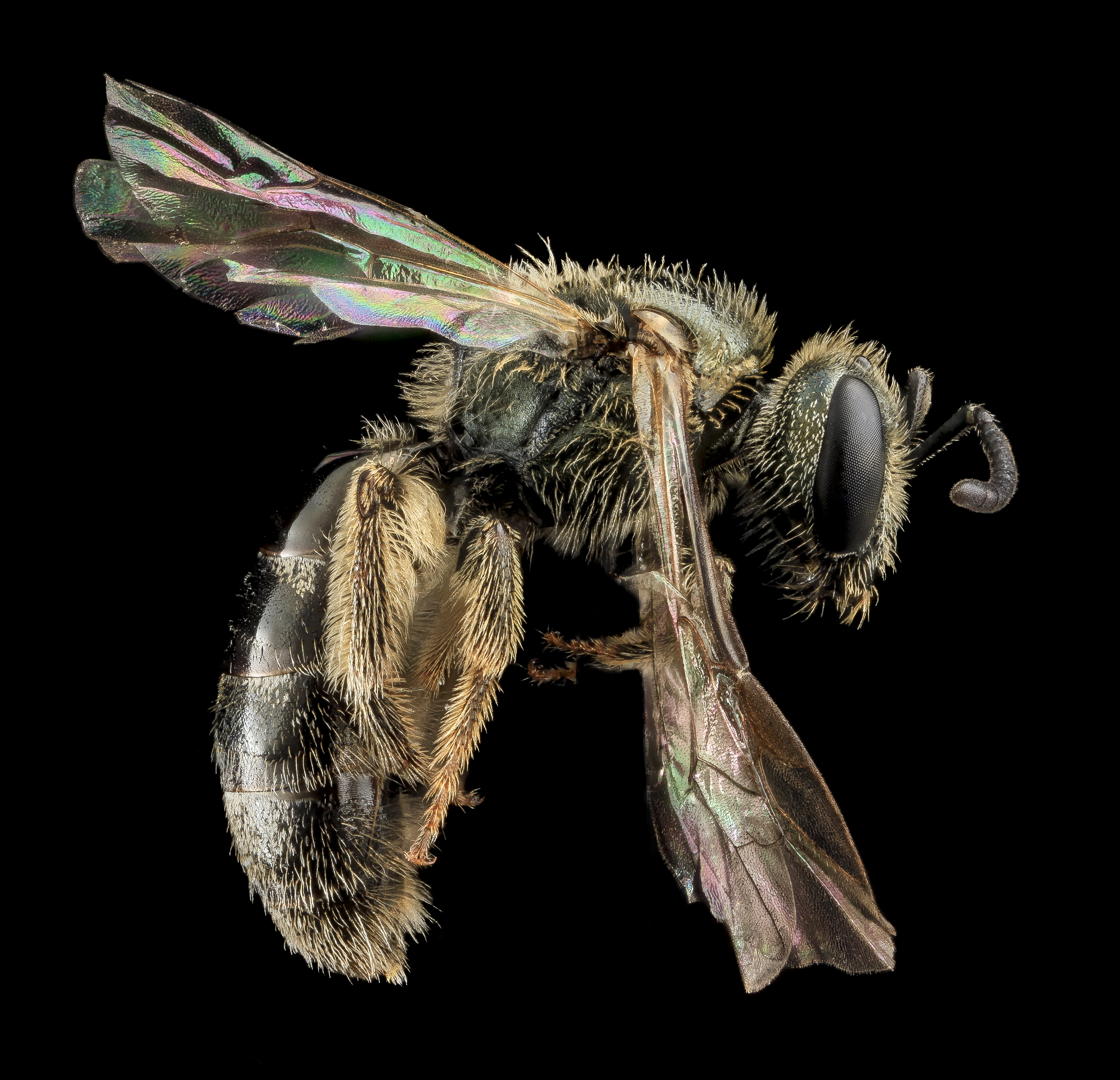

Scientific classification
- Domain: Eukaryota
- Kingdom: Animalia
- Phylum: Arthropoda
- Class: Insecta
- Order: Hymenoptera
- Family: Halictidae
- Tribe: Halictini
- Genus: Lasioglossum
- Species: L. gotham

Binomial name
- Lasioglossum gotham Gibbs, 2011

= Lasioglossum gotham =

Gotham bee

Species of bee in the United States

Lasioglossum gotham, commonly known as the Gotham bee or Gotham metallic-sweat bee, is an extant species of sweat bee native to Eastern and Midwestern United States.

== Description ==
The Gotham bee has a greenish-blue body and brown legs and antennae. Females are 6.1 to 7.1 millimetres (0.24 to 0.28 in) long, about the size of a sesame seed. Males are smaller than females, about 5.26 millimetres (0.207 in) long. The Gotham bee has a wide head (1.73 to 1.87 millimetres (0.068 to 0.074 in) wide versus 1.66 to 1.78 millimetres (0.065 to 0.070 in) long). Males are bluer in color than females which are more green. The Gotham bee can be distinguished from other sweat bees from the pattern of bristles on its abdomen. It most closely resembles Lasioglossum zephyrus and Lasioglossum smilacinae.

== Distribution and habitat ==
The Gotham bee was first spotted at the Brooklyn Botanic Garden. It has since been found throughout the Atlantic coast of the United States, as far south as Georgia. A few specimens have been found in the Midwest, and one in Nebraska. It nests underground.

== Discovery ==
The Gotham bee was discovered by John Ascher in 2010 as part of a biological survey of New York City's bee populations for the American Museum of Natural History (AMNH). When he first saw the Gotham bee, Ascher was unable to identify it as it did not precisely match any of the 700,000 bee specimens he curates for AMNH. He passed the bee to Jason Gibbs, who identified it as a new species in 2011 with the help of DNA testing. The specific name, L. gotham, was chosen because New York City is sometimes called "Gotham City". At the same time, Gibbs identified ten other new sweat bee species using AMNH's collections. His research, which was published in Zootaxa in October 2011, also reclassified 97 other species of Lasioglossum (Dialictus).

Due to its small size, the Gotham bee was previously indistinguishable from other bees native to New York City. Gibbs commented, "This little bee has been quietly living in the city, pollinating flowers in people’s gardens for years. It’s a pleasure to help give it some well-deserved recognition."

Unlike many honeybees, urban bees in the Northeastern U.S. have adapted to rising temperatures, which have caused spring—and the first bloom of flowers for pollination—to arrive about 10 days earlier in recent years, Rutgers University researchers said.
