= Nefusot Yehuda Synagogue =

Orthodox synagogue in Gibraltar

Nefusot Yehuda Synagogue (Flemish Synagogue)
- (Ladino: La Esnoga Flamenca)
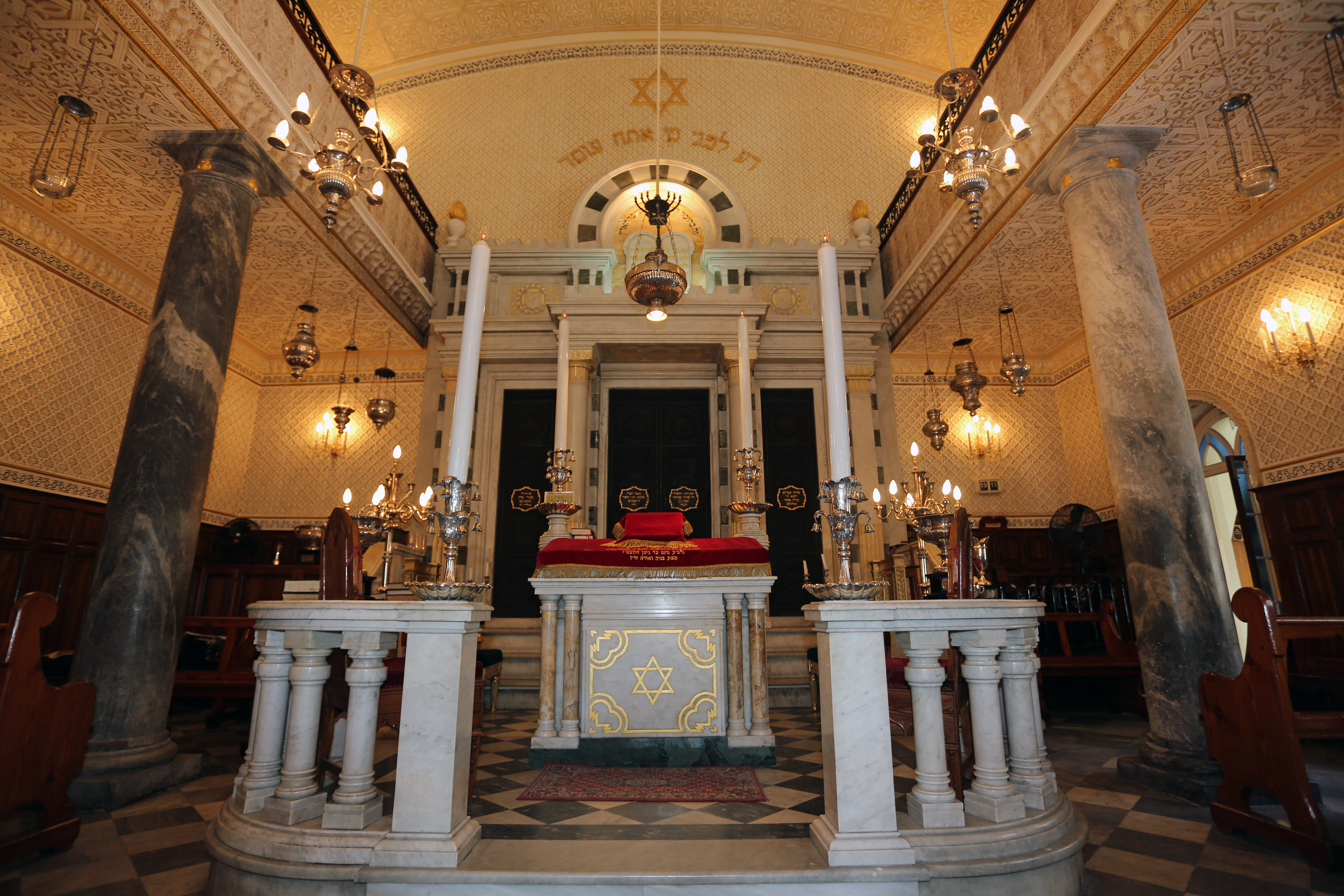
- The synagogue interior, in 2013

- Location of the synagogue in Gibraltar

Religion
- Affiliation: Orthodox Judaism
- Rite: Nusach Sefard
- Ecclesiastical or organisational status: Synagogue
- Status: Active

Location
- Location: 65 Line Wall Road, Gibraltar, British overseas territories
- Country: United Kingdom
- Coordinates: 36°08′21″N 5°21′17″W

Architecture
- Completed: c. 1800

The Nefusot Yehuda Synagogue, officially the Kahal Kadosh Nefusot Yehuda, more commonly known as the Flemish Synagogue (Ladino: La Esnoga Flamenca), sometimes known as the Line Wall Synagogue, is an Orthodox Jewish congregation and synagogue, located at 65 Line Wall Road, in Gibraltar, a British overseas territory of the United Kingdom.

== History ==
A synagogue has existed on this site since the early 18th century. This new synagogue came about because many thought that Moroccan traditions had begun to dominate the services at The Great Synagogue. Subsequently, members of the congregation chose to establish a new synagogue that would adhere to the more formal Dutch and London customs under which the Great Synagogue was founded.

The late eighteenth century was a time of prosperity in Gibraltar. Subsequently, the congregants were able to afford the $26,300 (nearly £3,000) cost of Gibraltar's next synagogue on the site of a garden bought by Semtob (Toby) Sequerra (b.1784 in London). The synagogue was built from 1799 to 1800 by Dutch merchants, originally modelled after the Portuguese Synagogue in Amsterdam. It was entitled Nefusot Yehudah (English: The Dispersed of Judah), and opened in 1799 or 1800. It is commonly known as the Flemish Synagogue.

An example of the lengths to which the congregation went to maintain Dutch traditions lies in the nature of their marriage contracts. The members of the Flemish Synagogue utilised sheets from a book with numbered pages for their marriage contracts, rather than the hand-illuminated parchment documents that were customary in Gibraltar. From its foundation until 1882, the minister of the synagogue was a member of the Conquy family. The Conquy family came to Gibraltar from Amsterdam in the 18th century but were originally from the northern Spanish city of Cuenca.

The interior of the building was destroyed by fire in 1913. The architect who was responsible for its reconstruction was an Italian who was more familiar with the architecture of Catholic churches. As a result, the Flemish Synagogue now has a beige, Dutch exterior and an Italian interior, with marble, and a reading desk incorporated into the ark for the Torah, instead of its original position in the centre of the building. The interior design was originally modelled after the Amsterdam Esnoga. After 1945, Moroccan tiles were installed in the interior of the synagogue, which has ornately patterned ceilings and walls. The only remnant of the original garden was a single palm tree in the synagogue's courtyard, which was removed in 2023.

== See also ==
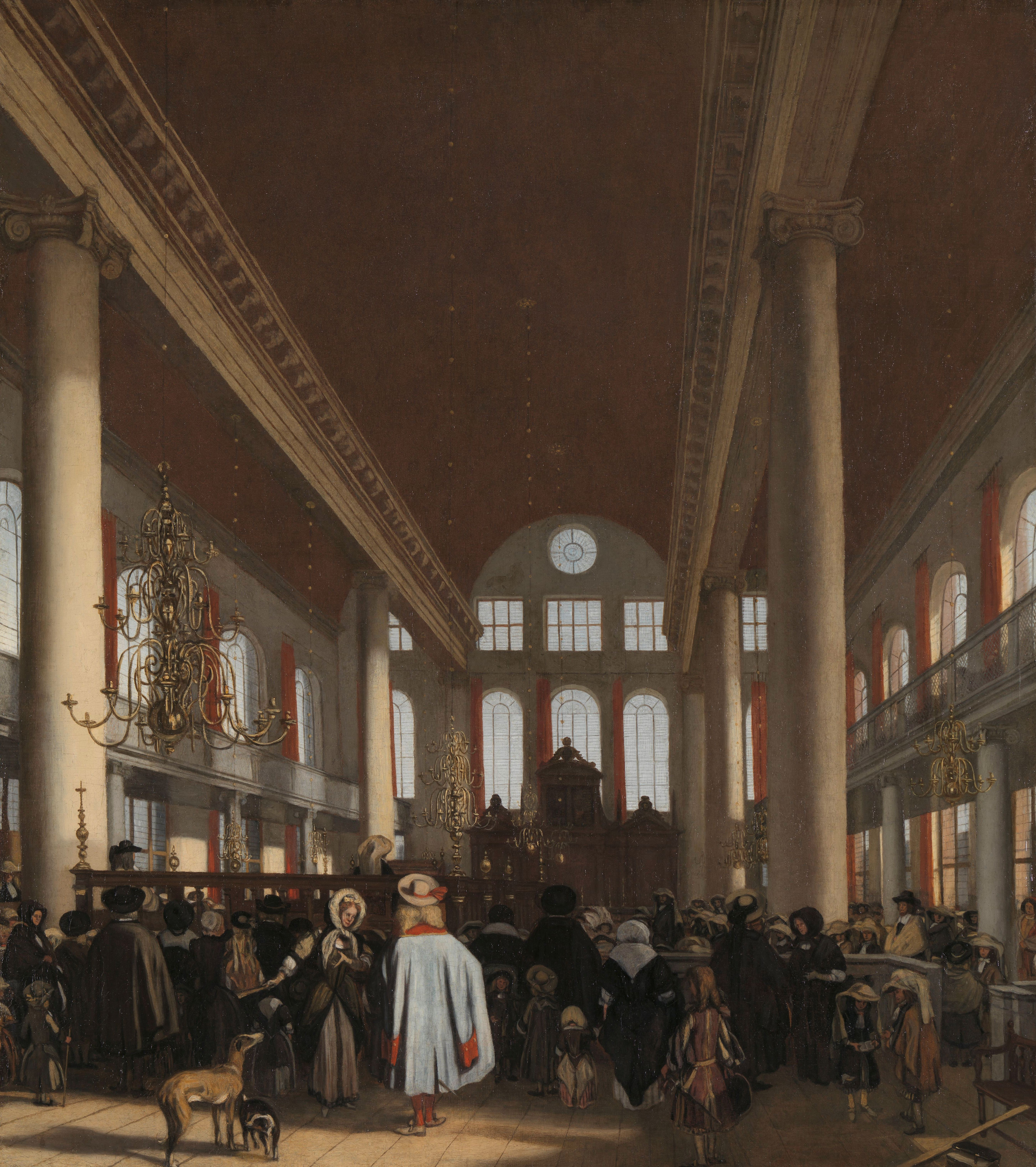
The Flemish Synagogue resembled the Portuguese Synagogue (above) in Amsterdam before the fire of 1913.

- History of the Jews in Gibraltar
- List of synagogues in Gibraltar
