= Jonathan Sternberg =

Jonathan Sternberg (July 27, 1919 – May 8, 2018) was an American conductor, musical director and professor emeritus of music. He is known for his work with symphonic orchestras in the United States, China, Germany and Austria, and for introducing modern American music to European audiences. For many years Sternberg served on the board of directors of the Conductors Guild and received the Guild's Award for Lifetime Service in 2009. Sternberg's performances are treasured by audiophiles and classical music enthusiasts all over the world.

== Early life ==
Sternberg was born in New York to parents of Austrian and Russian descent. He studied at the Juilliard School, the Manhattan School of Music and New York University, obtaining a B.A. in musicology in 1939. He also attended the Graduate School of Arts and Science at NYU and Harvard from 1939 to 1940. After the war he spent time studying under Léon Barzin and Pierre Monteux.

== Career ==
Sternberg's conducting debut took place on December 7, 1941 at the helm of the National Youth Administration Symphony Orchestra. Shortly thereafter he entered military service in the US Army, and at the end of the war he became conductor of the Shanghai Symphony Orchestra. After returning to the US he traveled to Austria, where in 1947 he made his debut conducting the Vienna Symphony Orchestra. He was the conductor on the first recording by the pianist Alfred Brendel of Prokofiev's Fifth Concerto. Around this time Sternberg collaborated with H.C. Robbins Landon, assisting in the search for music manuscripts all over Europe. Robbins Landon later founded the Haydn Society, prompting Sternberg to produce a series of recordings of Haydn and Mozart pieces, including the Nelson Mass and Posthorn Serenade.

After a year of conducting the Halifax Symphony Orchestra, Sternberg directed the Royal Flemish Opera for five years, subsequently returning to the US to become music director and conductor of the Harkness Ballet. He also served as musical director of the Atlanta Opera and Ballet, and accepted a visiting professorship of conducting at the Eastman School of Music, a position that he also later held at Temple University, where he remained for 20 years. He also served as a judge of conducting for The American Prize.

In 1972 and 1974, he conducted the Naumburg Orchestral Concerts, in the Naumburg Bandshell, Central Park, in the summer series.

Sternberg remained active throughout his life as a lecturer, conductor, and mentor. His wife, the English-German painter Ursula Sternberg-Hertz, died in 2000. A biography of Sternberg was later published by Tricorn Press (2014). In May 2018 Sternberg died of heart failure at the age of 98 in Philadelphia, Pennsylvania.
