= Herb Asher =

American academic

Herbert B. Asher (born October 31, 1944) is a professor emeritus of political science at Ohio State University in Columbus, Ohio. He is a well known commentator on current political events, writing numerous books on political polling and the like. One of the foremost authorities on Ohio politics, he has been interviewed by a host of news organizations that include CNN and CNBC. He gave the commencement address to Ohio State's graduating class of Winter 1996.

Asher received his BA in mathematics from Bucknell in 1966 and both his MA (1968) and PhD (1970) in political science from the University of Michigan. Asher was for many years both a tenured professor in the Department of Political Science and in charge of government relations for The Ohio State University. He went on to serve on the Ohio Ethics Commission and has since returned to the University. Today he serves as Special Counselor to the President of the University, advising her on policy decisions.
