= John Ascher =

Entomologist (living person)

John S. Ascher is an American entomologist. He specializes in the study of Apoidea (bees as well as sphecid wasps) and has been described as "one of the world's leading native bee taxonomists."

== Career ==
Ascher is an assistant professor at the National University of Singapore and is the senior project manager of the Bee Database at the American Museum of Natural History.

Ascher has compiled an index of all known bee species in our biosphere, which as of 2008 totaled 19,200 types of bees. Ascher told NPR’s Talk of the Nation in 2013, “We know that this is a big underestimate because there are vast numbers of new species…waiting in our collections for a taxonomist to have the resources to describe them.”

He led the data-collection effort on one project that determined “that declining bee species tend to have larger body sizes, restricted diets, and shorter flight seasons [and] ‘southern’ bees reaching their northern distributional limits in the Northeast are increasing, a finding that could reflect a response to climate change.”

His data was also used to generate a map of bee diversity worldwide that determined bees prefer dry, treeless landscapes in temperate zones rather than dense, humid forests, which is an “unusual distribution.” Daniel Cariveau of the University of Minnesota’s Cariveau Native Bee Lab described the creators of the map project as “really some of the best taxonomists in the world.”

Ascher found the newly identified bee species Lasioglossum gotham in a New York City botanic garden.
