= Asher Jay =

Designer, artist and conservationist

Asher Jay is a designer, artist, and conservationist. In 2012, Jay was named a USNC United Nations Women Design Star, and, in 2014, she was designated an Emerging Explorer by National Geographic. In 2013 she created a large animated digital billboard for 'March For Elephants' which was viewed by over 1.5 million people in New York's Times Square. Jay has contributed work to Faberge's The Big Egg Hunt with the proceeds supporting anti-poaching efforts in Africa. She also created Garbagea, an online parody project where users interact in and experience the United Flotsam of Garbagea. Jay holds a BFA in Fashion Design from Parsons School of Design.

== Exhibits, clients, commissions and installations ==
Jay has exhibited at/ or created works for the following; National Geographic, WWF, Wild Aid, American Museum of Natural History, US-Embassy Kenya, African Wildlife Foundation, Save Our Elephants, Thinking Animals Inc., Frankfurt Zoological Society, Amazon Aid, Elephant Voices, Elephant Family, Wyoming Untrapped, International Anti-poaching Foundation, Rhinos Without Borders, Africa Geographic, Pangea Seed, Elephants DC, Burn The Ivory, March For Elephants, Hands Off Our Elephants, Great Whales Conservancy, Whale and Dolphin Conservation, Mission Blue, TEDx.

== Sources ==
- Asher Jay, Creative Conservationist National Geographic
- Symbiartic's Top 10 Science Art Gifts Scientific American
- Wildlife Agency Seeks Educational Use For Crushed Ivory New York Times
- Artist's masterpiece is a load of garbage ScienceLine
- Heroines for the planet: Art Activist Asher Jay Eco-Chick
- Money on Extinction, but Fighting Nonetheless Scientific American
- WildAid launches new campaign with artist Asher Jay Gambling On Extinction
- Q&A with Artist Asher Jay "Cut Throat Captivity" National Museum of Animals
- A Whole Planet To Love Thinking Animals United
- Who is really responsible for plastic waste? Artist Asher Jay's "Garbagea" confronts us with our throwaway culture in this creative project. MNN
- Artist Asher Jay highlights the ocean crisis, poaching and conservation through art Treehugger
- Asher Jay, Designer. Artist. Writer. Activist. Project Third World
- Empress of garbage The Hindu
- Asher Jay, Creative Conservationist
