= Peter-Wolf Ascher =

Austrian neurosurgeon (1939–2023)

- Peter-Wolf Ascher, c. 1990
- Born: 12 February 1939; Munich
- Died: 13 March 2023 (aged 84); Salzburg, Austria
- Scientific career
- Fields: neurosurgery
- Workplaces: University of Graz; University of Rostock

Peter-Wolf Ascher (12 February 1939 – 12 March 2023) was an Austrian neurosurgeon known for his pioneering work in laser technology and the development of minimally invasive surgical procedures on the central nervous system. He was a long-time professor in Graz and founding head of the Department of Neurosurgery at the University Medical Center Rostock.

== Life and career ==
Ascher was born in Munich on 12 February 1939 to the geodesist Walter Ascher and his wife Trude née Kordik, a pharmacist. After attending primary school in Abtenau he graduated in 1957 from what is now the Christian-Doppler Gymnasium in Salzburg. In 1957 he began studying medicine at University of Graz in Graz, completing his doctorate in 1965. Ascher worked from 1966 at the University Clinic of Neurosurgery in Graz (LKH-Universitätsklinikum Graz). In 1972, he was recognized as a specialist in general surgery, and in 1978 he habilitated in neurosurgery. For five years he taught as a private lecturer before being appointed associate professor in 1983. In 1989/90, he served as acting head of the Graz University Clinic for Neurosurgery and subsequently became its first head of department. In 1991, he was awarded the Decoration of Honour of Styria.

In 1995, Ascher was appointed professor at the University of Rostock. He became the first head of the newly founded department of neurosurgery at the University Medical Center Rostock. Despite partly adverse institutional conditions, Ascher built up the department. The ward opened in 1999. The Rostock University Newspaper (17 April 2003) noted on the occasion of his retirement that the existence of neurosurgery at the University of Rostock was due to Ascher's personal commitment. He retired in 2002.

=== Personal life ===
Ascher grew up with two sisters, Erentraut (b. 1940) and Brigitte (b. 1948). He was baptised Roman Catholic, but later left the Church. He remained connected for life to the Corps Vandalia in Graz that he had joined in 1958. He enjoyed cooking and exploring the world. He came into contact with well-known personalities beyond medicine such as Deng Xiaoping, Princess Anne of Great Britain, and Michael Jackson. He was interested in meeting people of diverse cultures on all five continents, especially in Central and South America and the South Pacific islands. After his retirement in 2002, he lived in Salzburg.

Ascher died in Salzburg on 12 March 2023, at the age of 84.

== Publications ==
Ascher's scientific publications include:

- Ascher, P. W. (1977). Der CO₂-Laser in der Neurochirurgie. Molden, Vienna.
- Choy, D. S. J., Ascher, P. W., et al. (1992). Percutaneous laser disc decompression: Clinical results. Spine, 17(5), 949–956.
- Heppner, F., Ascher, P. W. (1984). The CO₂ laser in Neurosurgery. Neurosurgical Review, 7, 123–133.
- Ascher, P. W. (1985). Status quo and new horizons of laser therapy in neurosurgery. Lasers in Surgery and Medicine, 5(5), 499–506.
- Mohanty, S., Sutter, B., Mokry, M., Ascher, P. W. (1992). Herniation of calcified cervical intervertebral disk in children. Surgical Neurology, 38(6), 407–410.
