= Judah ben Asher =

German Talmudist and rabbi

Personal life
- Born: 30 June 1270 Cologne, Holy Roman Empire
- Died: 4 July 1349 (aged 79) Toledo, Castile
- Parent: Asher ben Jehiel (father)

Religious life
- Religion: Judaism

Judah ben Asher (30 June 1270 – 4 July 1349) was a German Talmudist and later rabbi of Toledo, Spain, son of Rabbenu Asher and brother of Jacob ben Asher ("Ba'al haTurim").

== Biography ==
At the age of thirteen, according to the custom of the German Talmudists of that epoch, Judah began to travel. He set out for Spain July 18, 1283, and arrived at Toledo April 7, 1285, consuming almost two years in his journey. He does not appear to have stayed long in Toledo, for in 1286 he married the daughter of his oldest brother, Jehiel, who is not known to have left Germany before 1305. After her death he married the daughter of Solomon, another brother of his. In 1305 his father, who was then obliged to leave Germany, sent Judah before him into Spain in order to arrange for his settling there.

Judah says in his testament that when he first came to Toledo he could not profit much by the Spanish Talmudists, as he understood neither their writing nor their language; and as he had sore eyes he could not even occupy himself with writing. After his father's death (1321 or 1328) Judah was chosen by the Toledo community as his successor in the rabbinate. He was held in great esteem by the members of his congregation, and when, on account of some disagreement, he manifested a desire to remove to Seville, they urged him to remain and doubled his salary. Still, he was not favorably inclined toward Spain; for he recommended his five sons to emigrate to Germany, his native country.

Asher, Judah's father, had ordained that every member of his family should give for charitable purposes a tithe of his earnings, and that three-fourths of the amount of such tithe should be confided to two trustees for distribution among the poor. In the agreement signed by Asher and his sons on October 20, 1314, Judah and his brother Jacob were appointed trustees. Judah approved heartily of this charitable institution, and at his request, on September 18, 1346, his sons signed an agreement making a similar arrangement in regard to the disposition of their own earnings. Judah died at Toledo July 4, 1349.

== Works ==
Judah was a recognized authority on Halakha, and his responsa, together with a fragment of his commentary on Shabbat, were published, under the title of Zikron Yehudah, by David Cassel (Berlin, 1846).
