= The Fall of the House of Usher (disambiguation) =

"The Fall of the House of Usher" is an 1839 short story by Edgar Allan Poe.

The Fall of the House of Usher and The House of Usher may also refer to adaptations of that work:

== Film and television ==
- The Fall of the House of Usher (1928 American film), by James Sibley Watson
- The Fall of the House of Usher (1928 French film), by Jean Epstein
- The Fall of the House of Usher (1950 film), a British film directed by Ivan Barnett
- House of Usher (film), 1960, by Roger Corman
- The Fall of the House of Usher (1980 film) film by Jan Švankmajer
- The House of Usher (1989 film), directed by Alan Birkinshaw
- The House of Usher (2006 film), directed by Hayley Cloake
- The Fall of the House of Usher (2023 miniseries), a series created by Mike Flanagan based on the short story and other works by Poe

== Operas ==
- La chute de la maison Usher (opera), unfinished, by Claude Debussy, of which three separate completions have been composed and staged
- The Fall of the House of Usher (Glass opera), a 1987 opera by Philip Glass
- The Fall of the House of Usher (Hammill opera), 1991, by Peter Hammill and Chris Judge Smith
- Usher House, a 2014 opera by Gordon Getty

== See also ==
- The Fall of the House of Usher#In other media, a complete list of adaptations
