= Daisy Ascher =

Mexican photographer (1944–2003)

Daisy Ascher Oved
- Born: 25 April 1944; Mexico City, Mexico
- Died: 31 March 2003 (aged 58)
- Occupation: Portrait photographer
- Known for: Book: Revealing José Luis Cuevas
- Parents: Samuel Ascher (father); Luisa Oved (mother)

Daisy Ascher Oved (25 April 1944–31 March 2003) was a Mexican photographer. Much of her work consists of portraits, including of Mexican cultural figures such as José Luis Cuevas and Juan Rulfo.

== Biography ==
Daisy Ascher was born in Mexico City in 1944 to Samuel Ascher and Luisa Oved. She studied at Universidá Motolinía and at Universidá Anáhuac. She died of cancer on 31 March 2003, at 58.

=== Education ===
She studied art at Motolinía University and Universidad Anáhuac, and also studied with the Photographic Club of Mexico. She published ten books of her photography, including Formas Silenciosas and Cien retratos por Daisy Ascher.

Ascher's influences included Eugene Atget, Alfred Stieglitz, Henri Cartier-Bresson, and Manuel Alvarez Bravo as well as Richard Avedon, Yousuf Karsh and Sam Haskins, all of them dedicated to portraits.

=== Work ===
Ascher was part of the Photographic Club of México and ventured into various themes and photographic genres making photographs for magazines such as Cosmopolitan, Vanidaes and Foto Mundo. She was recognised for her work by Atget, Stiglitz, Strand, Alvarez Bravo and Cartier-Bresson.

She was known for her portrait studies of José Luis Cuevas and Juan Rulfo. Her book “Revealing José Luis Cuevas” took her seven years to complete and is considered one of her best known works.

Among the exhibitions her work appeared in was a large touring exhibition of Mexican photography entitled Cofradía de Luz in 1996.

Mexican historian Fernando Benítez (1912-2000) wrote of Ascher, "Daisy masks and unmasks. Daisy armed with her magic eye, penetrates, bathes in light, covers with shadows, stands out and vanishes, and leaves us a gallery of amazing ghosts."

== Selected publications ==
- Revealing José Luis Cueves´, Photography by Daisy Ascher, prologues by Marta Traba, Ulalume González de Lleón and José Luis Cueves. Mexico, 1979
- One hundred portrait, Méxicu: INBA, 1981
- Silent Forms. Photography: Daisy Ascher, presentation by Juan José Arreola, Omar Gasca, José Luis Cueves, drawings by José Luis Cueves, 1983
- Rulfo, Les mios Imáxenes and mine Death. Photographs by Daisy Ascher, text by Fernando Benítez, Eduardo Matos Moctezuma, drawings by José Luis Cueves, México: Socicultur-DDF, 1987
- Chalco: Solidaridá Valley. Photographs of Daisy Ascher, proofs of: Fernando Benítez, Juan Rulfo, José Luis Cueves, Miguel Bonasso, Fernando Bon Abá, Marisol Salmones, Ánxelles González Gamio, drawings by José Luis Cueves. Méxicu, CEN-PRI, 1990
- The Skin of les Parés. Photographs by Daisy Ascher and Gilberto Chen, text by Luis Donaldo Colosio, Fernando Benítez, Andres Henestrosa, drawings by José Luis Cueves, Méxicu: PRI, 1991
- San Miguel de Allende. Photographs by Daisy Ascher and Gilberto Chen, presentation by Luis Donaldo Colosio, text by Fernando Benítez, watercolors by José Luis Cueves, Mexico: Sedesol, 1993
- The Máxicu World of Juan Rulfo. Photographs by Daisy Ascher, text by Luis Donaldo Colosio and Juan Rulfo, México: Conaculta / INBA / Sedesol, 1993
