= Asher ben Jehiel =

Rabbi and Talmudist (1250/1259–1327)

Rabbi Asher ben Jehiel
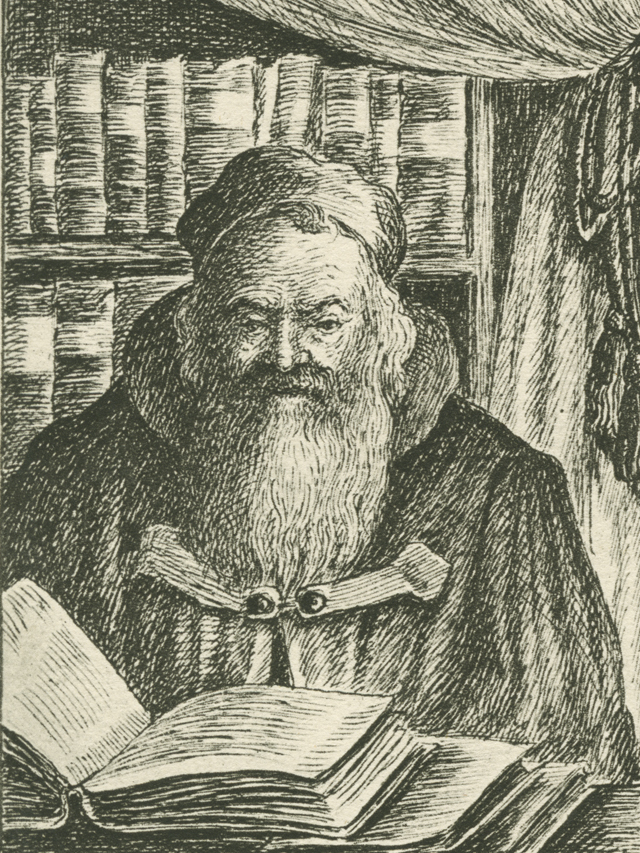
- Portrait by Meir Kunstadt, early 1900s

Personal life
- Born: c. 1250 probably Cologne, Holy Roman Empire
- Died: 24 October 1327 Toledo, Kingdom of Castile
- Children: Judah ben Asher; Jacob ben Asher; Jehiel ben Asher

Religious life
- Religion: Judaism

Jewish leader
- Yahrtzeit: 9 Heshvan

Asher ben Jehiel (Hebrew: אשר בן יחיאל, or Asher ben Yechiel, sometimes Asheri) (1250 or 1259 – 1327) was an eminent rabbi and Talmudist best known for his abstract of Talmudic law. He is often referred to as Rabbenu Asher 'our Rabbi Asher', or by the Hebrew acronym for this title, Rosh (רא״ש). His yahrzeit is on 9 Heshvan.

== Biography ==
Asher was probably born in Cologne in the Holy Roman Empire, and died in Toledo in the Kingdom of Castille. His family was prominent for learning and piety; his father Yechiel was a Talmudist and one of his ancestors was Eliezer ben Nathan. Asher had eight sons, the most prominent of whom were Jacob, author of the Arba'ah Turim, and Judah.

In 1286, Rudolf I, the King of East Francia, had instituted a new persecution of the Jews, and Asher's teacher, Meir of Rothenburg, left the region but was captured and imprisoned. Asher raised a ransom for his release, but Rabbi Meir refused it for fear of encouraging the imprisonment of other rabbis. Thereafter, Asher assumed Meir's position in Worms. However, he was forced to emigrate; in all likelihood, a victim of blackmail by the government, aimed at acquiring his fortune. He first settled in Provence, and then in Toledo, where he became rabbi on the recommendation of Solomon ben Aderet. Asher's son Judah testified to the fact that he died in poverty. Asher died in Toledo on the 9th Heshvan 5088 (1327 CE). His known surviving children were said to have been killed in the Massacre of 1391 that affected Spain.

Asher possessed "methodical and systematic" Talmudic knowledge, and was distinguished for his ability to analyze and thereby clarify long Talmudic discussions. He was known for his independent legal reasoning.

Asher was opposed to the study of secular knowledge, especially Greek philosophy. He held that philosophy is based on critical research, whereas religion is based on tradition and the two are thus "incapable of harmonization". He said that "none that go unto her may return"—in fact, he thanked God for having saved him from its influence, and boasted of possessing no knowledge outside the Torah. He attempted to issue a decree against the study of non-Jewish learning. One effect of this attitude was to limit his influence on secular Spanish Jewry. At the same time, within rabbinic circles, "he transplanted the strict and narrow Talmudic spirit from Germany to Spain", and this, in some measure, turned Spanish Jews from secular research to the study of the Talmud.

== Works ==
Asher's best known work is his abstract of halakha. This work specifies the final, practical 'halakha, leaving out intermediate discussion and concisely stating the final decision. It omits areas of law limited to the Land of Israell, such as agricultural and sacrificial laws, as well as the aggadic portions of the Talmud. Asher's son Jacob compiled a list of the decisions found in the work, under the title Pisqe Ha-Rosh. Commentaries on his halakhot were written by a number of later Talmudists. In yeshivot, this work is studied as a regular part of the daily Torah study.

This work resembles the Halakhot of Isaac Alfasi but differs in quoting later authorities: Maimonides, the Tosafists, and Alfasi himself. One theory states that the work is actually not a commentary on the Talmud but is rather a commentary on Alfasi, given that it always starts with the text of his work. Some however dispute this.

Asher's work has been printed with almost every edition of the Talmud since its publication. This work was so important in halakha that Yosef Karo included the Rosh together with Maimonides and Alfasi as one of the three major posqim 'decisors' considered in determining the final ruling in his Shulchan Arukh.

Asher also wrote:

- Orchot Chaim, an essay on ethics, written for his sons. It begins with the comment, “Distance yourself from haughtiness, with the essence of distancing.” Orchot Chaim is today an important work of musar literature.
- A commentary on Zeraim (the first order of the Mishnah)—with the exception of Tractate Berachot.
- A commentary on Tohorot (the sixth order of the Mishnah).
- The Tosefot ha-Rosh, Tosafot-like glosses on the Talmud.
- A volume of responsa; see History of Responsa: Fourteenth century.
- There is a volume of responsa entitled Besamim Rosh that is falsely attributed to the Rosh. In fact it has been shown to be a forgery from the 18th century, and contains controversial decisions which contradict what the Rosh wrote in his (genuine) responsa. This collection was published by Saul Berlin, Hirschel Levin's son. It was exposed as a forgery by Mordecai Benet, amongst others.
- A commentary on the Torah which often uses mystical interpretations such as using gematria and acronyms similar to his son Jacob's more famous work Rimzei Ba'al ha-Turim.

== Influence ==
During the Toledo era of Spanish Jewish history, the influence of R. Asher ben Jehiel and his followers, who maintained a distinctly Talmudic rabbinic approach, was significant. However, the wider intellectual Jewish culture was deeply drawn to philosophy, with Zaragoza emerging as a prominent center where philosophy was studied alongside Talmudic scholarship within the local yeshivas.
