= Asher D =

Asher D may refer to two British rappers:

- Asher D (rapper), British rapper active during the 1980s and 1990s
- Ashley Walters (born 1982), also known as Asher D, British rapper and actor and member of So Solid Crew
