= List of synagogues in Gibraltar =

This is a list of synagogues in Gibraltar, a British overseas territory of the United Kingdom.

The congregations of all four synagogues in Gibraltar, worship in the Orthodox Jewish tradition.

== List ==
| Name | Affiliation/ritual | Location | Established | Ref | Images |
|---|---|---|---|---|---|
| The Great Synagogue; Qahal Kadosh Sha'ar ha-Shamayim | Orthodox | 47/49 Engineer Lane | 1724 | | |
| Abudarham Synagogue | Orthodox | 119 Parliament Lane | 1820 | | |
| The Little Synagogue | Orthodox | 91 Irish Town | 1789 | | |
| Nefusot Yehuda Synagogue | Orthodox | 65 Line Wall Road | c. 1800 | | |

== See also ==
- History of the Jews in Gibraltar
