= Isaac Nieto =

Isaac Nieto (1702–1774) (Hebrew: יצחק ניטו) was Haham of the Portuguese congregation Sha'are Hashamayim, Bevis Marks, London, and the son of David Nieto. He was officially appointed as "ḥakham ha-shalem" in 1733, but gave up the post in 1741 and went abroad. He returned in 1747 and took up the profession of notary.

In 1749 Nieto became Gibraltar's first Rabbi when he travelled to Gibraltar from London and established the Shaar Hashamayim congregation, the oldest synagogue in Gibraltar, otherwise known as the Great Synagogue.

In 1751 the London congregation requested him to accept the post of ab bet din, his colleagues being Isaac de Valle and Jacob Coronel. A few years afterward a violent dispute arose with regard to the titles of the members of the bet din and as to the relation of the members to one another. Nieto wrote a letter of resignation on 17 March 1757, and on the following 14 July he was prohibited from exercising the functions of assessor. He died in London in 1774.

Nieto preached on 6 February 1756, the day of fast and penitence ordered by the king, a Sermon Moral, published in Spanish and English in London, 1756. Better known is his translation of the prayer-book in two volumes: Orden de las Oraciones de Ros Ashanah y Kipur (London, 1740) and Orden de las Oraciones Cotidianas, Ros Hodes Hanuca y Purim (ib. 1771). This translation was the basis of all subsequent translations (e.g., those of Pinto and of A. and D. da Sola).

== Jewish Encyclopedia bibliography ==
- Moses Gaster, History of Bevis Marks, pp. 129 et seq.
