= Zika Ascher =

Czech artist and designer active in Britain (1910–1992)

Ascher in February 1949

Zika Ascher (born Zikmund Ascher; 3 April 1910 – 5 September 1992), nicknamed "The Mad Silkman", was a Czech textile businessman, artist and designer. He became pre-eminent in the related fields of British textiles, art and fashion. He created his own textile company, which made its name with experimental fabrics and scarves designed by famous contemporary artists.

== Background and family ==
Ascher was born in Prague in a family of rich Jewish textile businessmen. He excelled as a young, successful skiing champion and he began his career as a textile businessman. In February 1939, he married his wife Lida, Ludmila born Tydlitátová (*1913 Prague), coming from a Catholic family as the youngest of 6 children (3 daughters), educated on the secondary school of trade and economy. The same year they moved to England, because Czechoslovakia was annexed by Germany. In 1940 Zika entered the British army. In 1942, Zika and Lida Ascher set up their own textile company, Ascher (London) Ltd. Soon they collaborated with a cousin, Ernest Enda Ascher, who settled in Paris as an art businessman and helped them with trade contacts. The Aschers had one son, Peter, who lives in the United States.

== Henry Moore textiles ==
A substantial number of Ascher textiles designed by the British artist Henry Moore are held in the V&A collection. The designs were commissioned by Zika Ascher from 1944 to 1946. The first collection of Henry Moore textiles printed by Ascher was introduced at the Dorchester Hotel in London in May 1945. The Henry Moore Foundation published a book by Anita Feldman and Sue Pritchard in 2009, entitled Henry Moore Textiles, which contains extensive references and examples of Ascher textiles designed by Henry Moore. The book was published to coincide with an exhibition at the Henry Moore Foundation in 2008, which later went on tour. The book was published by Lund Humphries, a leading publisher on British Art.

There have been only four instances of production of the Henry Moore textiles and scarves by the Aschers in the 65 years since they were designed: The first was in the late 1980s when Zika Ascher printed two designs for wall panels which had not previously been printed. The second was when the Henry Moore Foundation asked the Aschers to reprint various curtain textiles that had faded over time at the artist's house at Perry Green. The third was a reprint of Moore scarves for the gift shop at Tate Modern, when they mounted a major retrospective of the artist's work in 2010. The fourth was as part of the first scarf collection by Sam Ascher, grandson of Zika Ascher, for Spring/Summer 2011, in which some archive designs by Moore, Graham Sutherland, and other artists were featured.

== Influence ==
Zika Ascher's significant influence on the collections of major couturiers, such as Christian Dior, Cristóbal Balenciaga and Yves Saint Laurent, is cited in The Vogue History of Twentieth-Century Fashion by Jane Mulvagh (London: Viking Penguin, 1988). Christian Dior referred to Ascher as "Mr Rose Pompom" after Ascher designed a beautiful rose-printed fabric in the 1950s, and used it extensively in the summer Haute Couture collection by Dior. Apollo magazine London published a six-page monograph on Ascher in 1987. His work was displayed at the first major retrospective of Balenciaga's work at the Silk Museum in Lyon 1986. One of the first John Galliano collections, "Les Incroyables", featured many yards of Ascher's cream cheesecloth, drenched in water.

An obituary in The Independent in 1992 credits Ascher with not only being the first to supply shaggy mohairs but also with introducing cheesecloths and romantic lacy fabrics to the catwalks of the late 1950s and mid-'60s.

=== The Ascher Project ===
What was then known as The Ascher Project, to create innovative textiles based on contemporary art, ran in tandem with the Ministry of Information's propaganda initiative, to introduce modern art to the "man on the street". The War Pictures at the National Gallery in 1944 included paintings by Henry Moore, and there is footage of Zika Ascher trawling the National Gallery rooms, inspecting Moore's work. It was not long before Ascher had Moore designing scarves, curtain fabrics and dress fabrics, creating a vibrant new design language that was to be accessible to all.

=== Ascher scarves ===
In 1946 Ascher went to Paris and, using a telephone in the Cafe du Rond Point des Champs-Élysées, called Pablo Picasso, Henri Matisse, André Derain or Alexander Calder. "Every one of them invited Zika Ascher to meet them", wrote Lucy Davies in the Sunday Telegraph (Stella Magazine, November 2010). Eventually, 51 leading French and English artists designed scarves for Ascher. They were called "Artists' Squares" and, often printed on rayon because of shortages of other material immediately following the war. The artists were commissioned between 1946 and 1955; most contributed only one scarf design, but others, for instance Cecil Beaton, designed up to four, or more (Feliks Topolski). They were all printed in limited editions and continue to crop up in fine art auctions.

=== Ascher fashion fabrics ===
Zika Ascher was responsible for introducing hand-tufted mohair fabrics into haute couture in 1957. At the time, textile houses such as Ascher would present biannual collections of fabrics to the couturiers, who would then choose their fabrics from what was on offer. The first to use Ascher Mohair was Antonio del Castillo, for the French fashion house Lanvin-Castillo's Autumn-Winter collection that year. Ascher's hand-tufted mohair fabrics continued to be much in demand for several years, and were featured for instance in the Balenciaga Autumn–Winter collection of 1964. A coat designed by Cristóbal Balenciaga made with an Ascher green, red and pink hand-tufted mohair fabric was featured on the cover of French Vogue in November 1964, eight years after the first Ascher mohair.

In 1969 Ascher experimented with a "disposable" paper fabric, which had to be made resilient enough not to tear. He commissioned Celia Birtwell and put her Happy Bubble design into production — it was made into a famous minidress designed by Ossie Clark. A photograph on page 96 of the V&A Museum book Ascher: Fabric, Art, Fashion shows a crêpe de Chine fabric design by Lucian Freud. He and other great artists at the time put their trust in the quality of the Ascher printing and colour matching. "Artists commissioned by Zika Ascher were fortunate to have their work sensitively interpreted and skilfully put into repeat...Zika Ascher was insistent upon top quality printing and accurate colour matching; trials continued until design and printed fabric tallied exactly." (Valerie D. Mendes and Frances M. Hinchcliffe)

== Legacy ==
Ascher's legacy is governed by their only son Peter. A 264-page book about the work of Ascher and his wife Lida, by Valerie D. Mendes and Frances M. Hinchcliffe, in collaboration with Lida Ascher, was published by the Victoria and Albert Museum (V&A) in London, to coincide with a 1987 retrospective exhibition of the Aschers' work. The title Ascher: Fabric, Art, Fashion, describes the breadth of their achievements in these three related fields. Three photographic portraits of Zika Ascher are held in the collection at the National Portrait Gallery in London; two by John Gay and a third by Francis Goodman. The Museum of Applied Arts in Prague organised a large research and exhibition under the title Šílený hedvábník (in English The mad silkman) in March 2019. Czech TV is preparing a film about Zika Ascher, that will be broadcast in September 2019.
