= Bill Asher (guitar maker) =

American luthier

William Allen Asher (born 24 July 1964) is a Californian-born luthier (guitar maker) in the Los Angeles area. He has been in the guitar repair and restoration business for over 30 years and has been building high-end, custom guitars for 15 years. He is best known for helping revive the lap steel guitar instrument into popular music by creating a modern-day lap steel guitar that is now used in a variety of musical genres.

== Early life ==
Asher was born in Santa Monica, California, and is the son of actress Elizabeth Montgomery and director William Asher. He was brought up in Beverly Hills and lived with his brother Robert and sister Rebecca. He attended El Rodeo School, then Beverly Hills High School. He graduated from University High School in 1982. He was always interested in music, even at a young age. It was in this high school wood shop class where he attempted to build his first guitar body. After graduation from high school, Asher took his unfinished guitar to a Los Angeles repair shop owned by Jeff Lunsford. At the end of the summer, Lunsford offered Asher an apprenticeship at the guitar shop.

== Career ==
After the summer of 1982, Asher began an apprenticeship with luthier Jeff Lunsford at a Los Angeles guitar repair shop. He worked with Lunsford for 4 years before moving on to work with other luthiers such as Rick Turner, and Mark Lacey, before opening up his own guitar repair shop, Guitar Traditions, in Santa Monica. He moved from Guitar Traditions and now works at a private shop in Los Angeles called Asher Guitars & Lap Steels. He services guitars for many famous musicians and builds high end guitars and lap steels.
