= Jehiel ben Asher =

Spanish poet

Jehiel ben Asher was a Jewish liturgical poet; flourished in Andalusia in the fourteenth and fifteenth centuries. He was the author of four liturgical poems, mentioned by Zunz ("L. G. " p. 520), and of a dirge of twenty-five strophes on the persecution of the Jews in Spain in 1391. Jehiel was also the author of a poetical work entitled "Ma'aseh 'Ugah," published, together with Profiat Duran's "Iggeret Al Tehi Ka-Aboteka," at Constantinople about 1577. Firkovich claims to have seen in the possession of a Karaite of Constantinople named Joseph Ḳimḥi a manuscript containing a poem by Jehiel, entitled "Ha-Rewayah."
