= Great Synagogue (Gibraltar) =

Synagogue in Gibraltar

Great Synagogue of Gibraltar (Kahal Kadosh Sha'ar HaShamayim)
- Ladino: Esnoga Grande; (Hebrew: קהל קדוש שער השמיים); (Ladino: Esnoga Sha'ar Hashamayim)
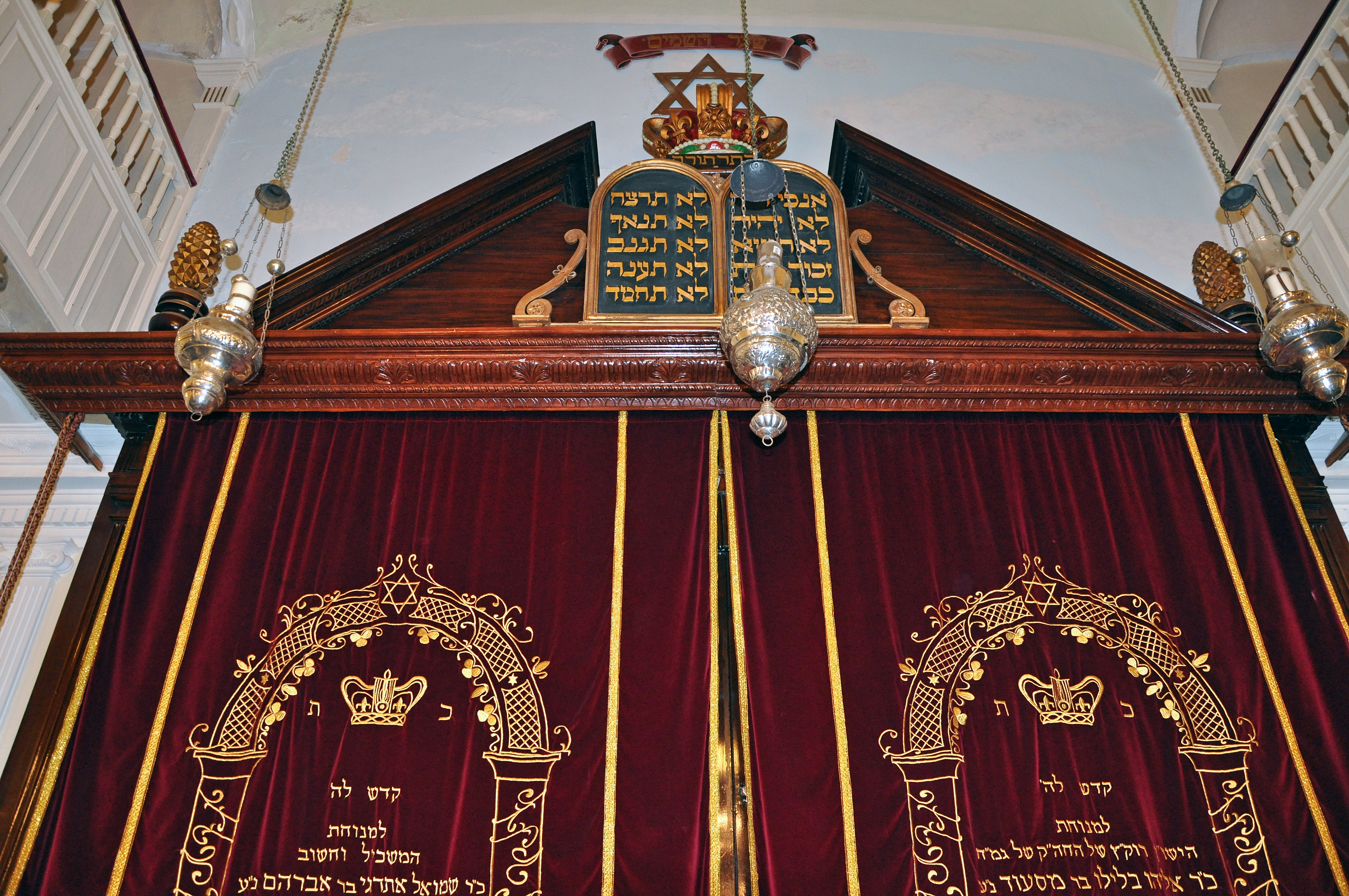
- Torah ark in the synagogue, early 20th century

- Location of the synagogue in Gibraltar

Religion
- Affiliation: Orthodox Judaism
- Rite: Nusach Sefard
- Ecclesiastical or organizational status: Synagogue
- Status: Active

Location
- Location: 47/49 Engineer Lane, Gibraltar, British Overseas Territories
- Country: United Kingdom
- Interactive map of Great Synagogue of Gibraltar (Kahal Kadosh Sha'ar HaShamayim)
- Coordinates: 36°08′31″N 5°21′09″W

Architecture
- Type: Synagogue architecture
- Style: Regency
- Founder: Rabbi Isaac Nieto
- Established: 1724 (as a congregation)
- Groundbreaking: 1724
- Completed: 1812

The Great Synagogue of Gibraltar (Ladino: Esnoga Grande), also known as Kahal Kadosh Sha'ar HaShamayim (Note: Also: Qahal Kadosh Sha'ar ha-Shamayim.) (Hebrew: קהל קדוש שער השמיים, lit. 'Holy Congregation Gate of Heaven'; Ladino: Esnoga Sha'ar Hashamayim), is an Orthodox Jewish congregation and synagogue, located in the British overseas territory of Gibraltar. It was the first synagogue on the Iberian Peninsula to operate following the Jewish expulsions from Spain and Portugal in 1492 and 1497, respectively. Completed in the 1720s, it is the oldest synagogue in continuous use in Gibraltar and is Gibraltar's principal synagogue.

== History ==
The Sha'ar HaShamayim congregation was founded in 1724 (Note: However, there is substantial disagreement between authorities as to whether the synagogue was built in 1723-4 or 1749.) by Isaac Nieto from London. Nieto was also the first Rabbi to lead the congregation and was one of the Jewish merchants who settled in Gibraltar in the early eighteenth century. During the 1727 Siege of Gibraltar, he was Gibraltar's sole importer of food supplies from Morocco. Following the death of his father in 1728, Nieto returned to London where, in 1732, he was appointed Chief Rabbi of the Bevis Marks Synagogue. His partner James Argatt became the beneficiary of his decision to leave Gibraltar; the monopoly of Moroccan food imports was transferred to him.

The synagogue was inaugurated in 1724 on a plot of land granted to the Jews by the then Governor of Gibraltar, Richard Kane. Having been rebuilt several times, the present building largely dates from 1812, completed in the Regency style, and shares features in common with the parent Portuguese Synagogue in Amsterdam (1675) and Bevis Marks Synagogue (1701).

The entrance to the original building was on Synagogue Lane, now Serfaty's Passage.

Following its destruction in the storm of 30 December 1766, a larger synagogue was rebuilt at the same site in 1768, but with an entrance on Engineer Lane. The second building was also destroyed during attacks by the Spanish on 17 May 1781. A third building was constructed after the conclusion of the Great Siege of Gibraltar.

In 1812, that version of the synagogue was damaged by fire and had to be partially rebuilt. The current vaulted ceiling of the synagogue dates from that 1812 renovation. The synagogue at 47/49 Engineer Lane has colourful tiles, marble floors, wrought iron spindles, and wooden furniture. The façade of the two-and-a-half-storey, domestic-scale building features round-arched windows flanking a round-arched doorway.

The building is listed under the Heritage and Antiquities Act.

== Gallery ==
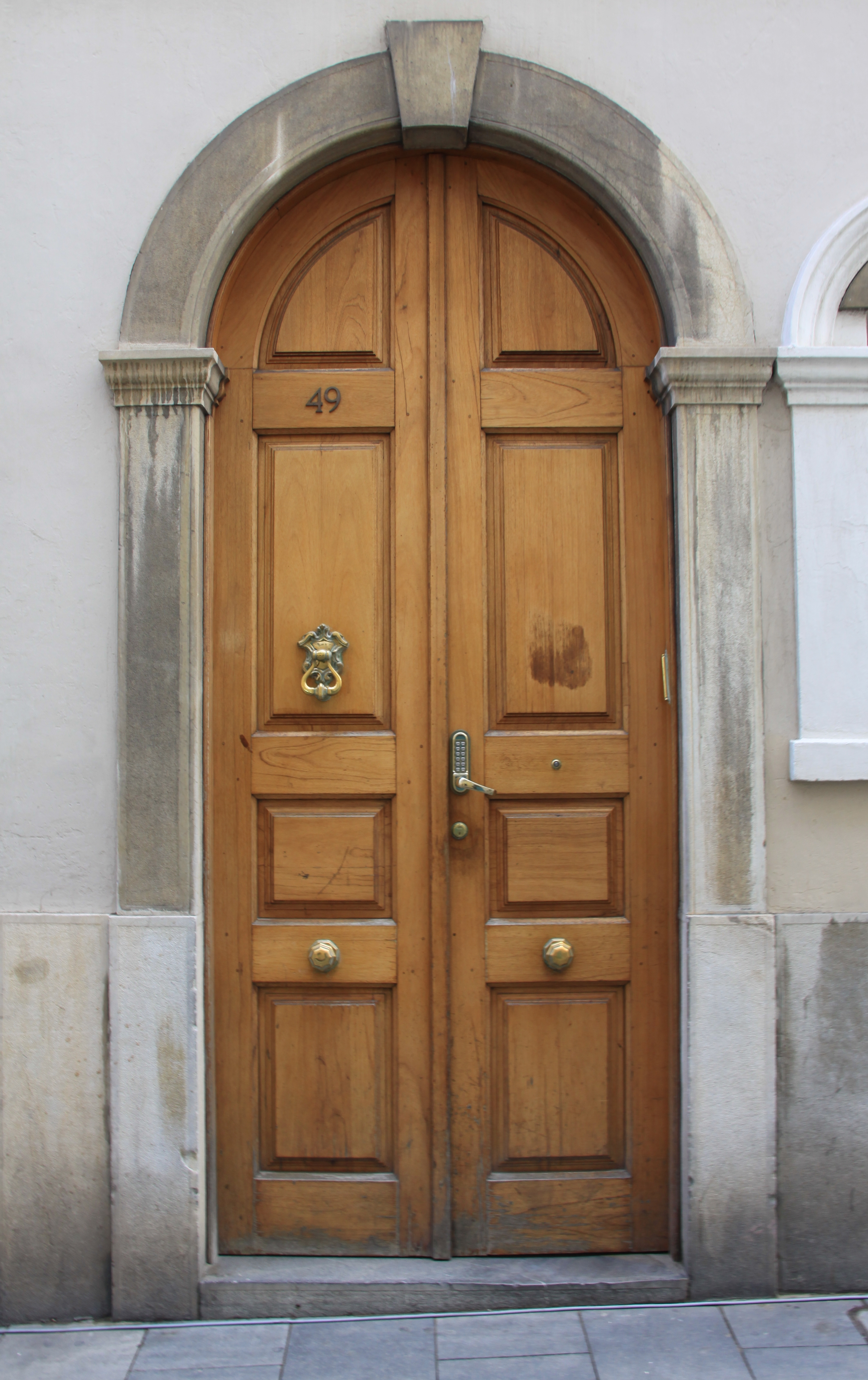
Main entrance to the synagogue

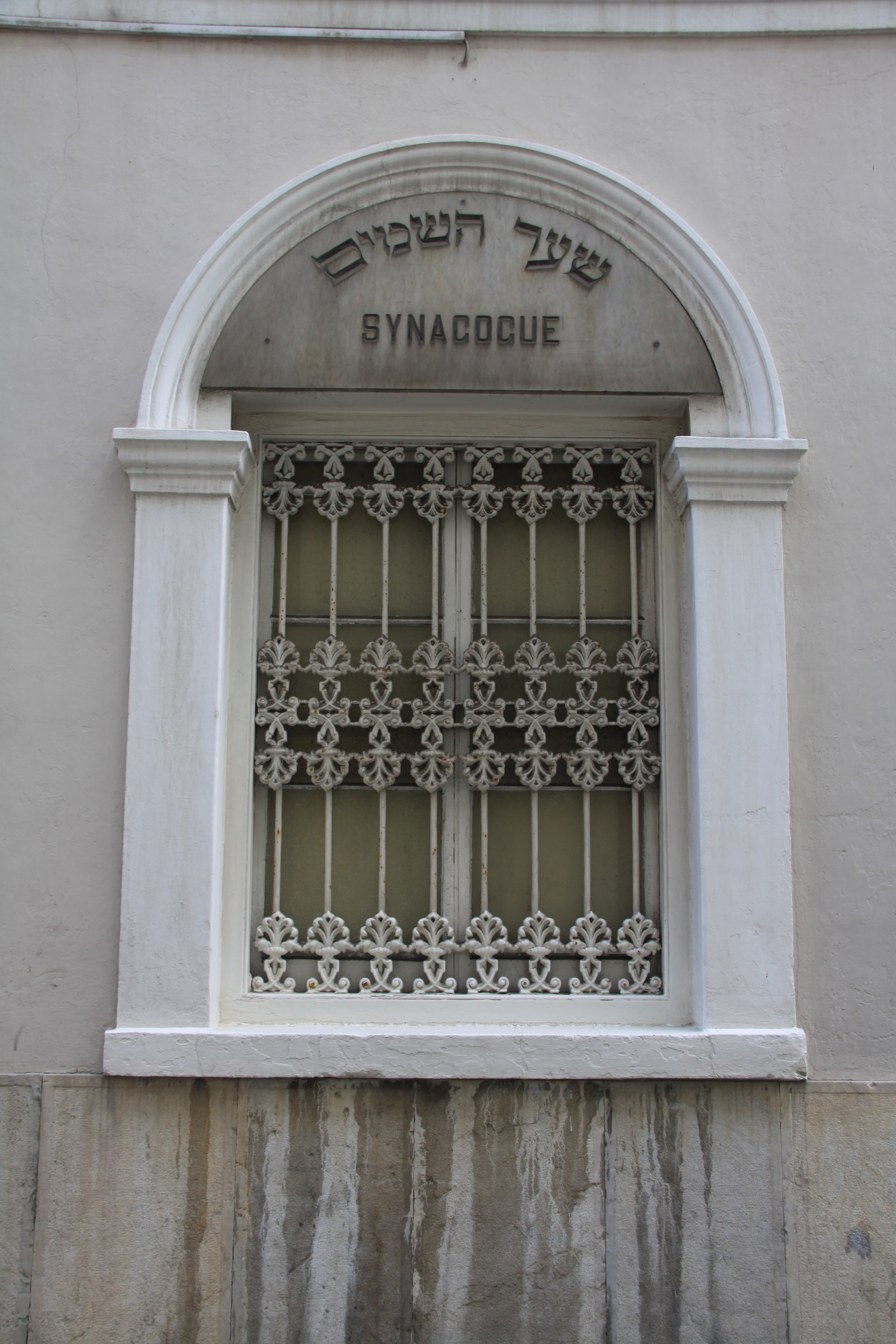
Window of the synagogue with Hebrew and English writing

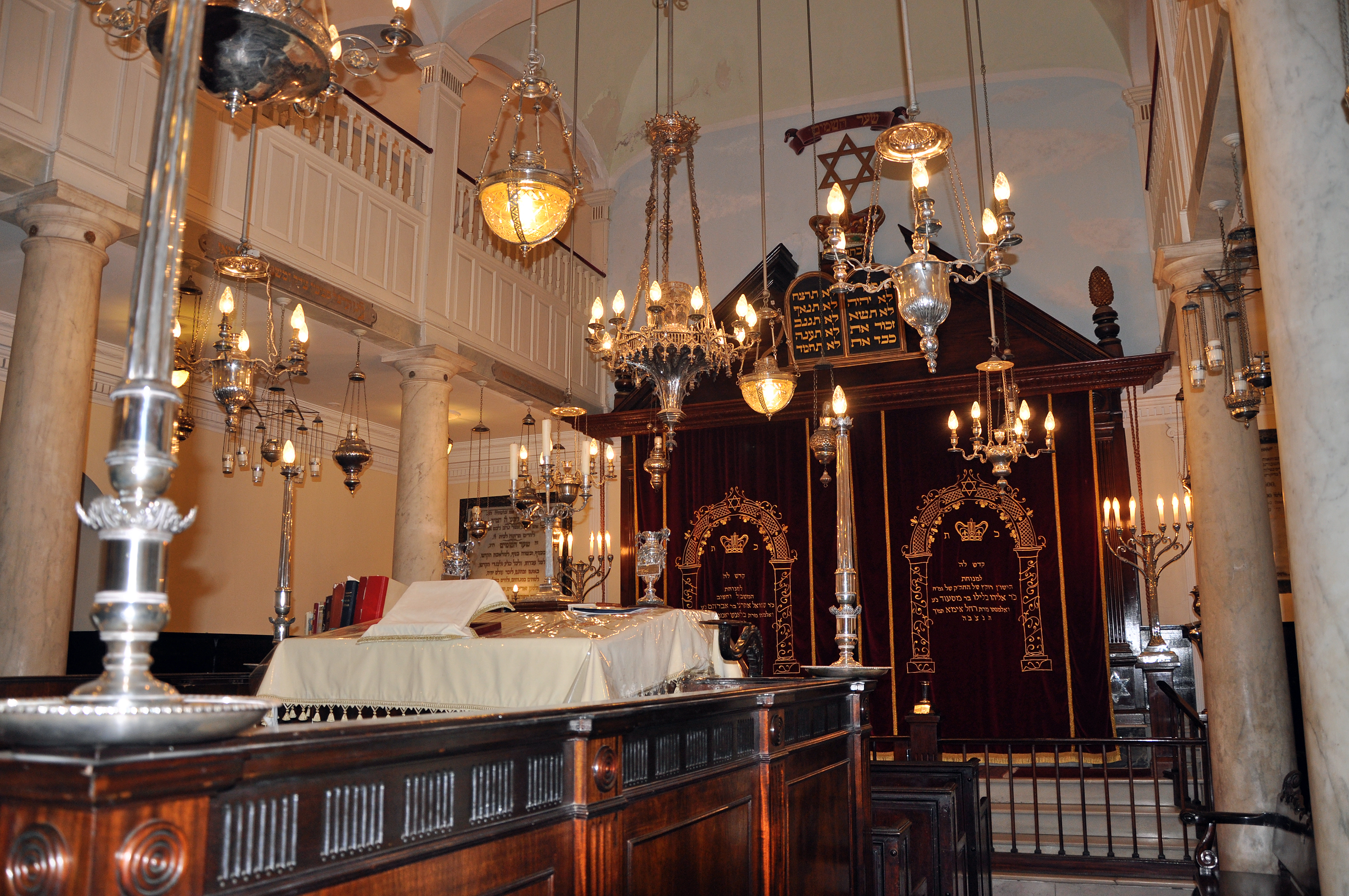
Inside the synagogue

== See also ==
- History of the Jews in Gibraltar
- List of synagogues in Gibraltar
