= Meshullam Solomon =

Rabbi Israel Meshullam Solomon
- Title: Chief Rabbi of the United Kingdom

Personal life
- Born: Israel Meshullam Zalman Emden; 1723 Altona near Hamburg
- Died: 1793 (aged 69–70) Hamburg

Religious life
- Religion: Judaism
- Synagogue: Hambro' Synagogue

Israel Meshullam Solomon (1723–1794), born as Israel Meshullam Zalman Emden in Altona near Hamburg, was one of two rival Chief Rabbis of the United Kingdom and the rabbi of the Hambro' Synagogue. Solomon claimed authority as Chief Rabbi of the United Kingdom from 1765 to 1780, while Rabbi Tevele Schiff claimed the same authority from 1765 to 1791. Rabbi Solomon was the son of Jacob Emden, the grandson of the Chacham Tzvi, and a great-great-great-grandson of Elijah Ba'al Shem of Chelm. After being rabbi at Podhajce, he was appointed rabbi of the Hamburger Hambro' Synagogue in London in 1764. The Hambro' Synagogue managed to bring up his salary to £150 as well as to grant him £50 for travelling expenses and £120 to set up house in London.

== Career ==
After Chief Rabbi Hart Lyon left London in 1764 it was agreed that his successor should be appointed and maintained by the Great Synagogue and the Hambro' Synagogue jointly. However, they could not agree on a single name. The Great Synagogue appointed their Rabbi, Tevele Schiff as Chief Rabbi, while the Hambro' Synagogue appointed their Rabbi, Israel Meshullam Zalman (Schiff's cousin), who became known in England as Meshullam Solomon.

Each rival Chief Rabbi tried to claim authority, causing a split in the London Rabbinate. The Jews of the provinces were confused as to which Chief Rabbi they were to follow. Meshullam Solomon was sure of his supremacy, as he had been legitimately appointed Chief Rabbi and two synagogues followed him in London, as against only one which accepted Schiff (even if it was the larger and the wealthier synagogue). Solomon therefore considered Schiff to be an impostor, and had no hesitation in subscribing himself "Rabbi of London and the provinces".

Meanwhile, Meshullam Solomon threw himself into his work in London, optimistically declaring himself Rabbi of the Ashkenazi communities. In 1777 Solomon published the translation of a sermon he had preached the previous year at the General Fast for the success of the British Army during the American War of Independence. This was the earliest address delivered in an Ashkenazi synagogue in England to be made available in print to the general public.

When in 1774 he invalidated a get which had been brought from Amsterdam in 1768, he received a storm of uncomplimentary criticism from a Sephardi scholar, Shalom Buzaglo. In 1778, his own matrimonial troubles attracted attention in the British press who wrote that the "Jew Priest" of the Hambro' Synagogue had divorced his "Priestess". His relations with his congregation seem to have become embittered, while their income decreased to such a degree that they were unable to continue to afford the salary for a Rabbi of their own.

The problem was resolved only after a split within the community at Portsmouth. Although a dissident group of the Portsmouth Jewish population established a rival congregation recognising the authority of Meshullam Solomon, the main community formally accepted the authority of Rabbi Schiff, who in 1766 began to be known by the title "The Chief Rabbi". Whatever the reason, Meshullam Solomon left London in 1780 for a post in Russia.

Rabbi Schiff described Solomon's departure to his brother, Rabbi Meir in Frankfurt:

"As regards the Rabbi of the Hamburger (congregation), all is at an end. From hour to hour he begged the community to allow him to remain; nevertheless, they insist upon what they decided, to give him £50 yearly for life. He is leaving next week, and your astonishment still holds good, why I should have to do everything without being paid for it, apart from presents on Purim and Rosh Hashana from those who were in the habit of remembering me on those occasions (I have no income from the Hambro Synagogue)."

With Solomon's departure from England, the dispute which had begun in 1765 was ended. The Rabbinate of the Great Synagogue was from that time recognised without question by all the Jewish communities of the provincial towns, all of whom accepted Tevele Schiff's authority.

Meshullam Solomon died in Hamburg in 1794.

Jewish titles
Preceded by Hart Lyon	Chief Rabbi of the United Kingdom; 1765–1780	Succeeded by Tevele Schiff
