= Chief Rabbi of the United Hebrew Congregations of the Commonwealth =

Senior rabbi of British Orthodox Jews

Chief Rabbi of the United Hebrew Congregations of Great Britain and the Commonwealth
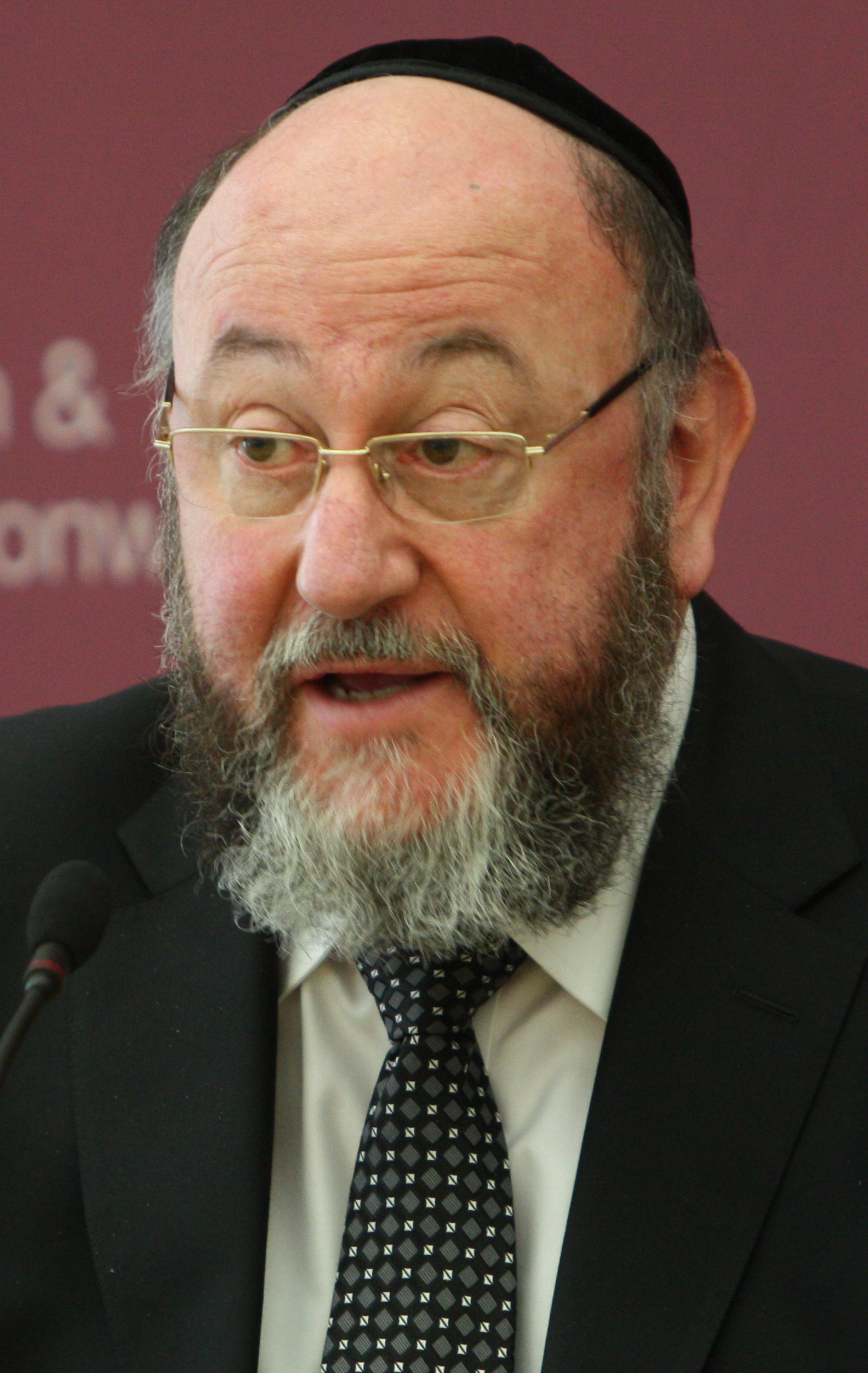
- Incumbent; Ephraim Mirvis since 2013
- United Synagogue
- Type: Religious leader
- Inaugural holder: Aaron Hart
- Website: chiefrabbi.org

The Chief Rabbi of the United Hebrew Congregations of Great Britain and the Commonwealth is the senior rabbi of the United Synagogue, a union of British Orthodox Jewish synagogues. The Chief Rabbi is one of the prominent Jewish spiritual leaders in the UK. The Chief Rabbi's full title is the "Chief Rabbi of the United Hebrew Congregations of the Commonwealth", previously "... of the British Empire". His title and position has historically, since 1758, been considered to be Britain's equivalent of the Archbishop of Canterbury for the Orthodox Jewish community.

Two Chief Rabbis have been ennobled and entered the House of Lords: Rabbi Lord Jonathan Sacks, and his predecessor, Rabbi Lord Immanuel Jakobovits. The current chief rabbi is Ephraim Mirvis.

== List ==
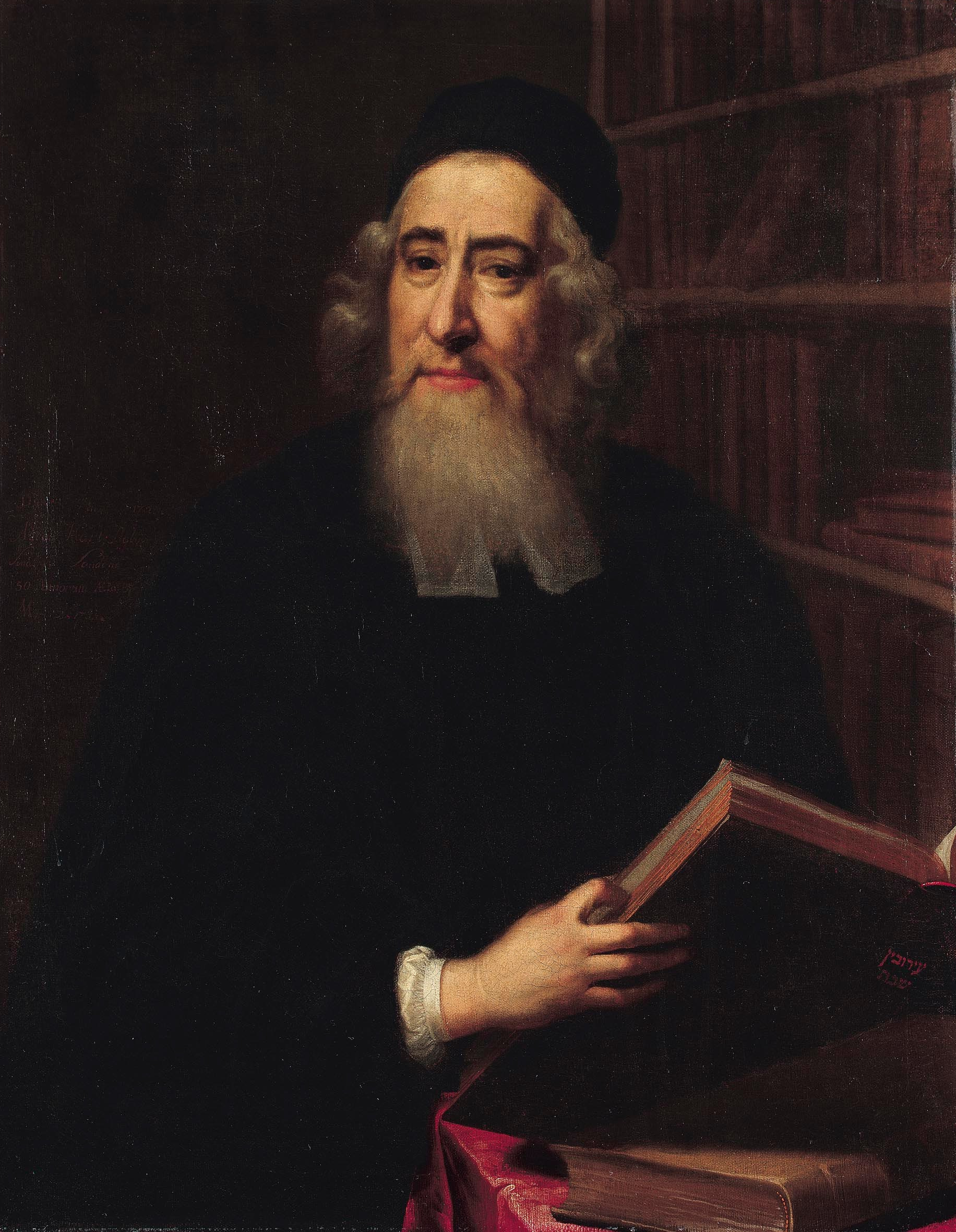
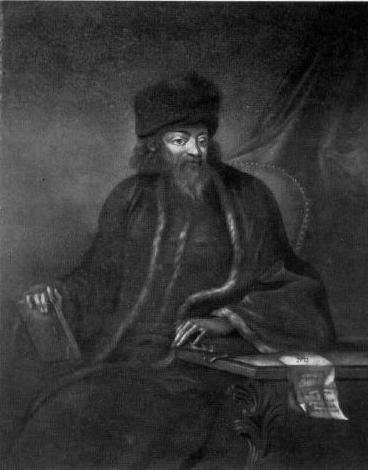
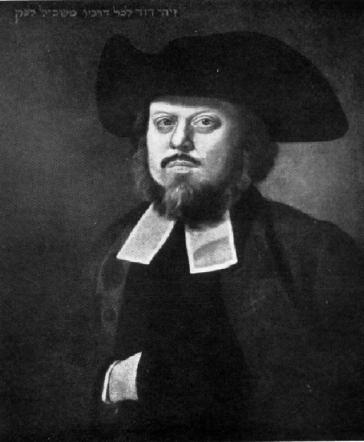
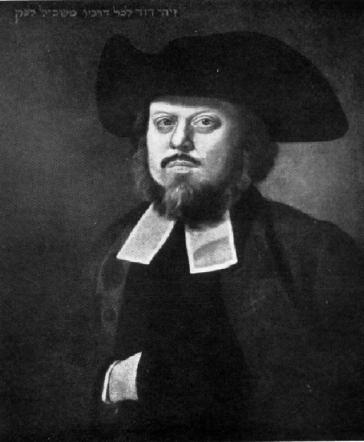
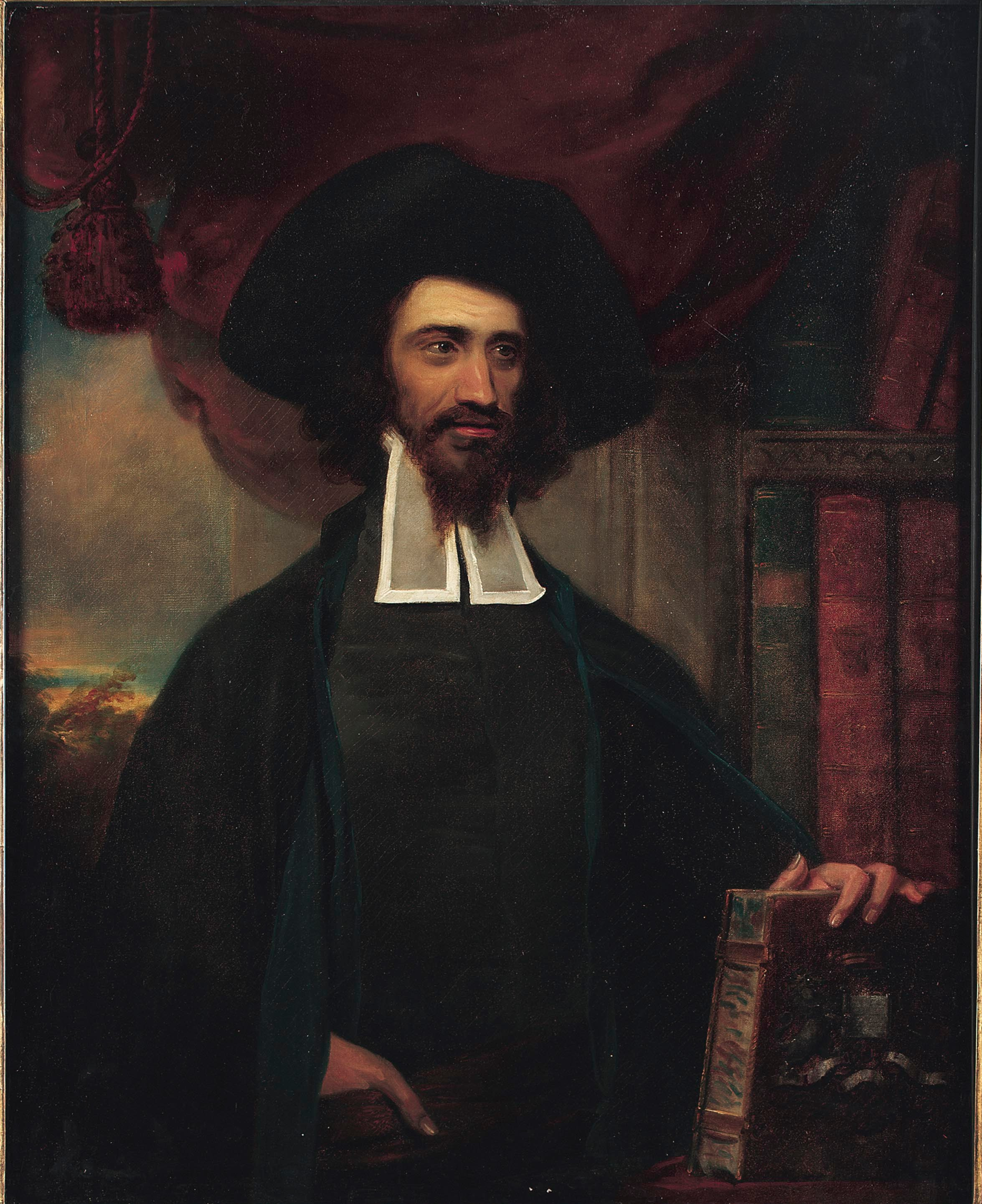
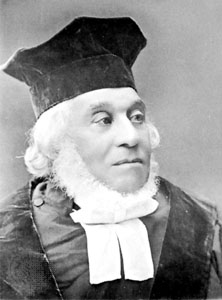
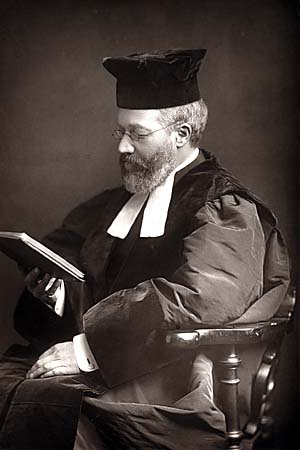
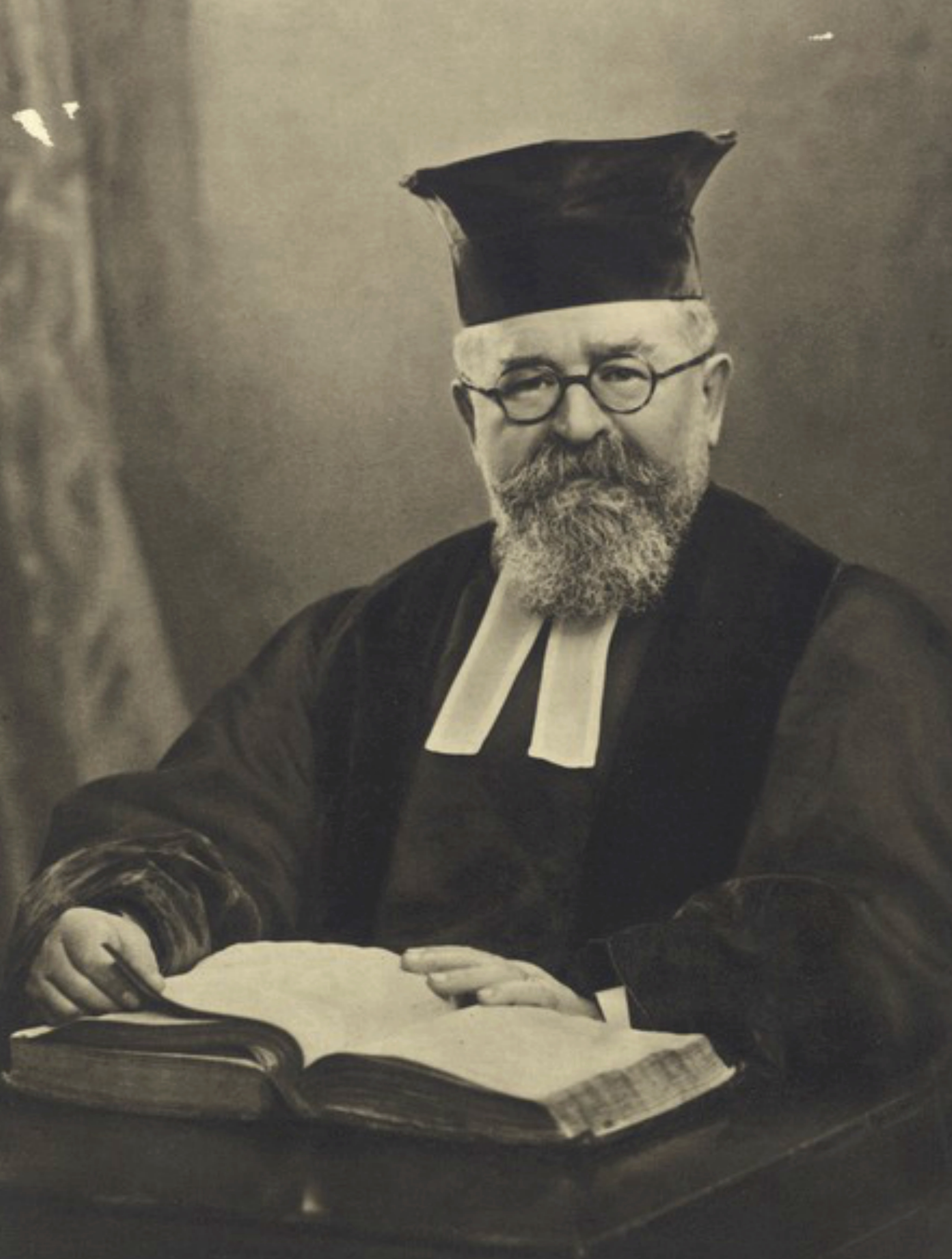
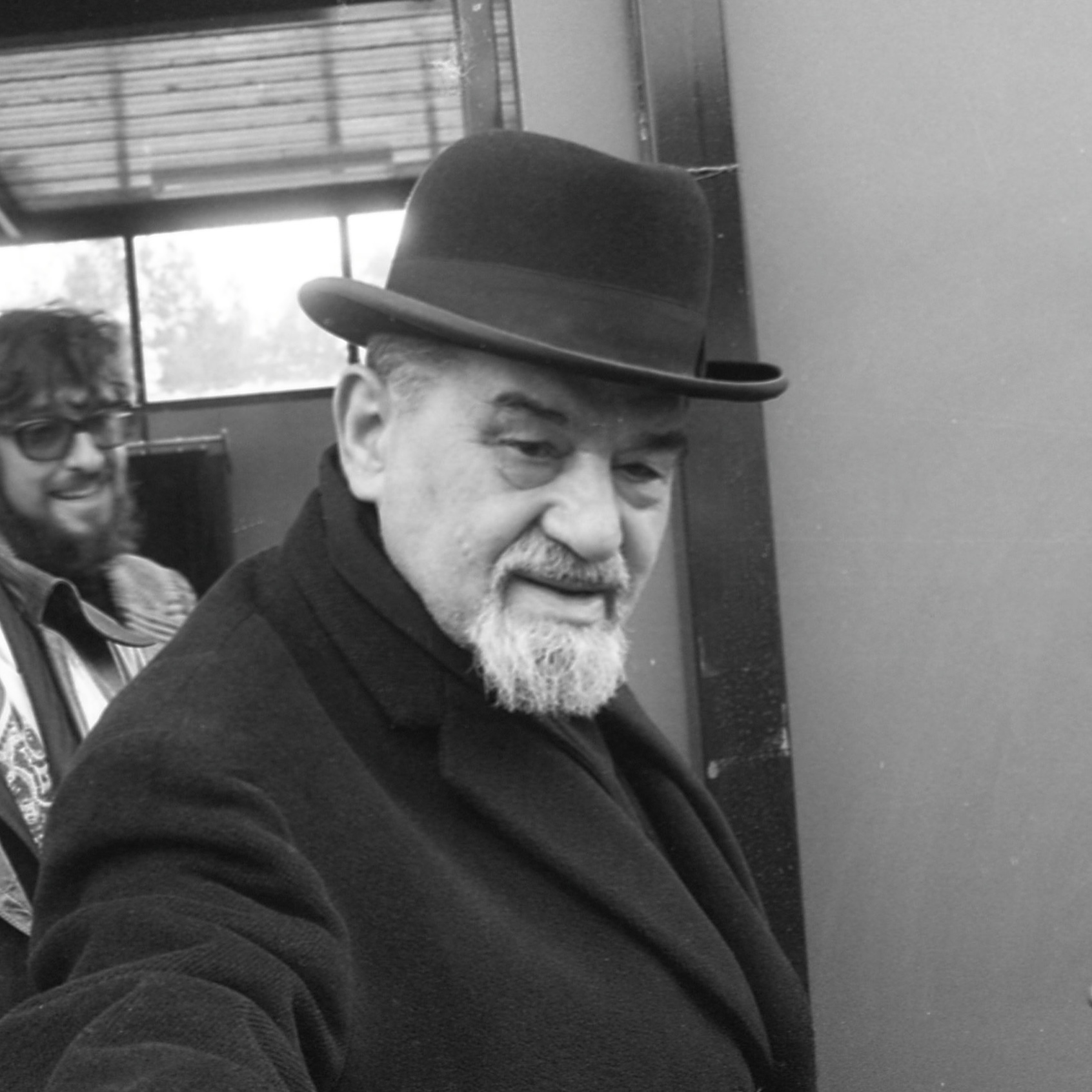
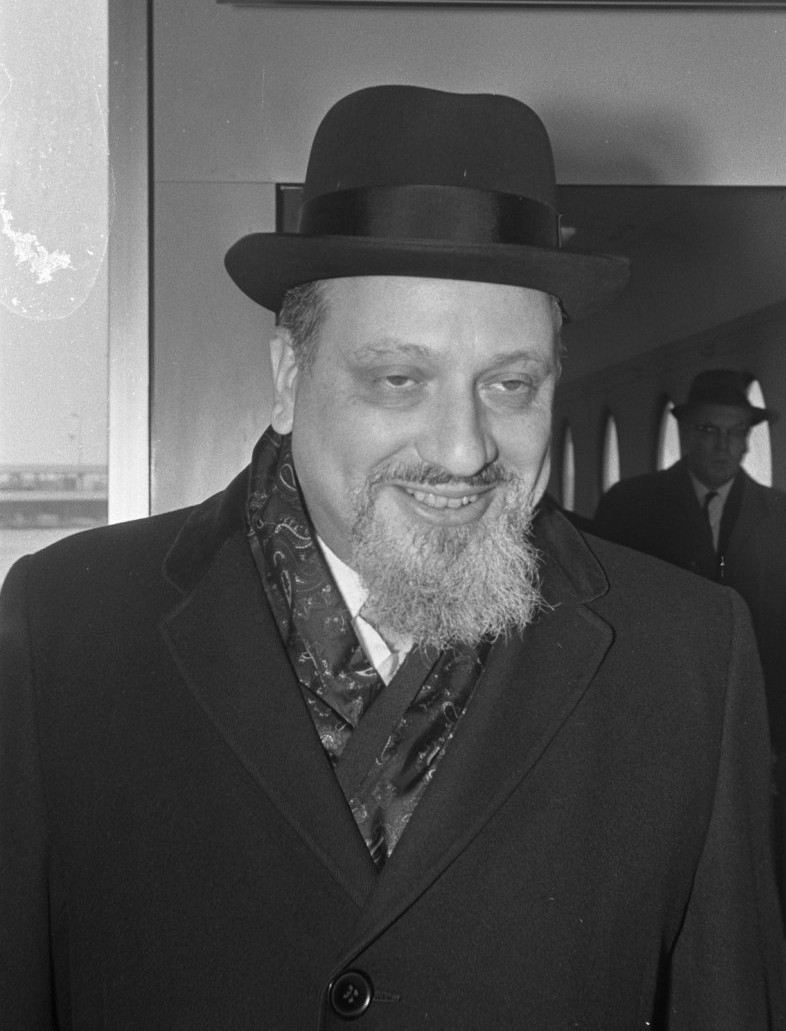
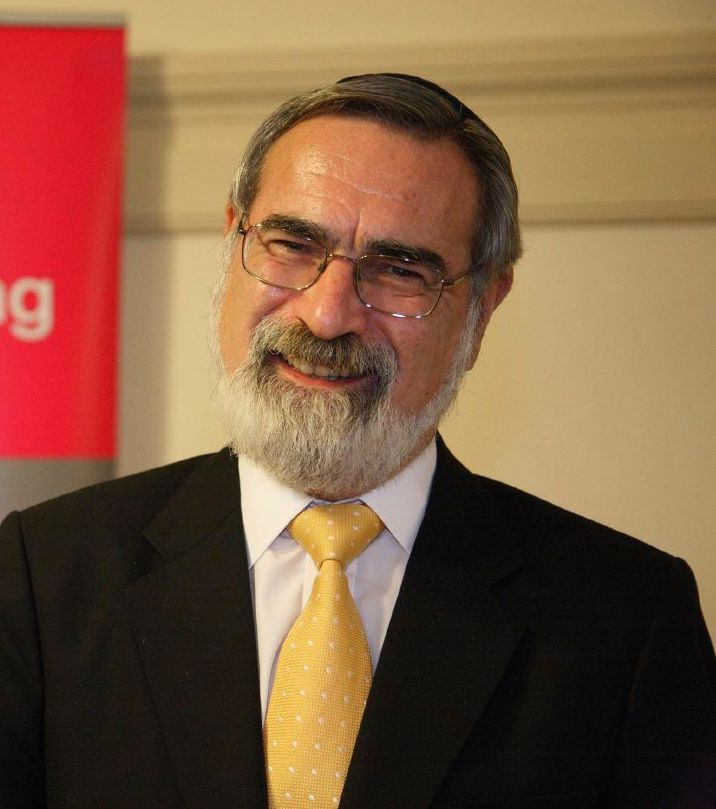
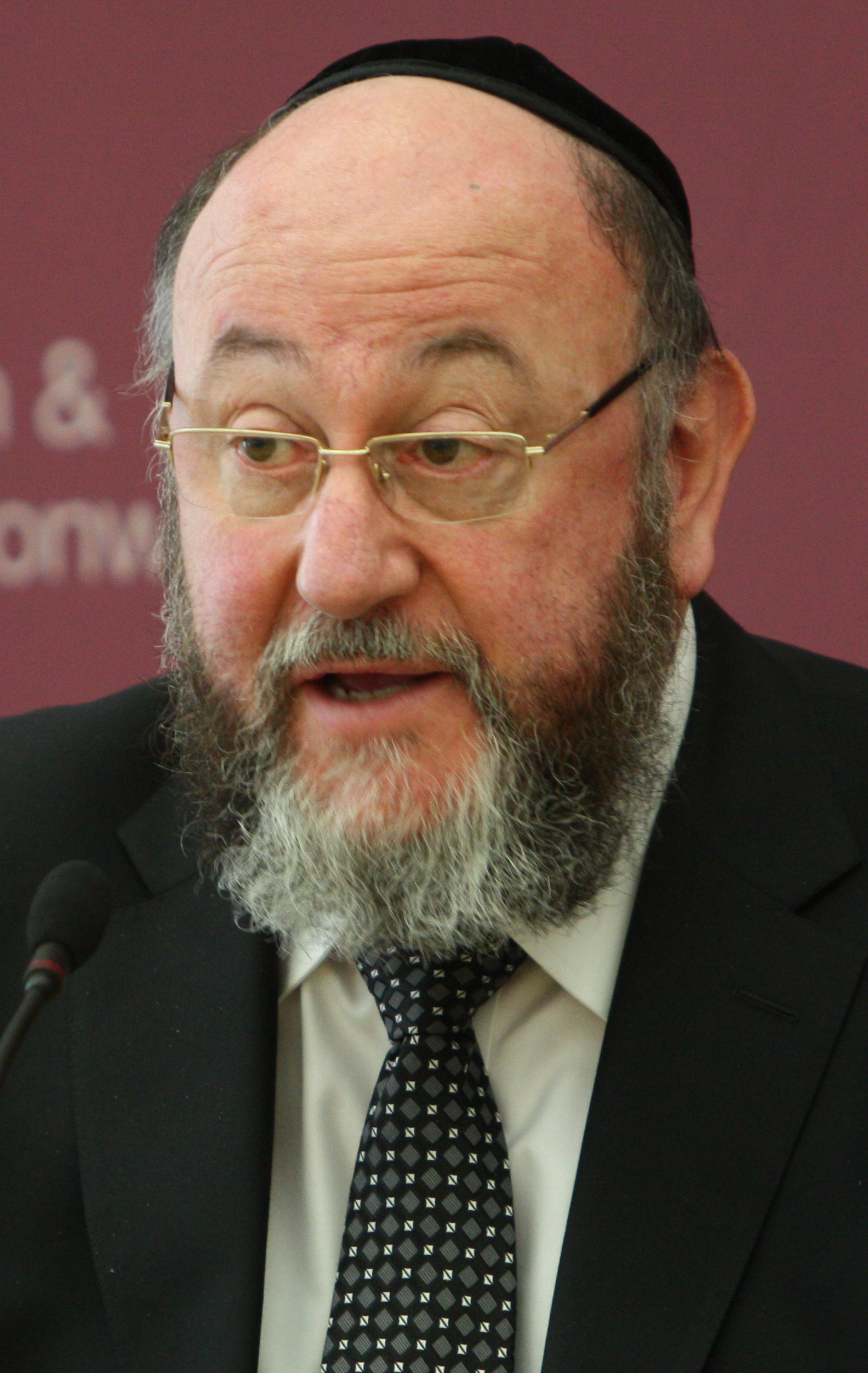
No.	Image	Name	Term	Title	Notes	Reason for termination
1		Aaron Hart	1704 – 1756	Rabbi of the Great Synagogue		Died in office
2		Hirschel Levin	1758 – 1764	Rabbi of the Great Synagogue and Hambro Synagogue		Resigned
3		Tevele Schiff	1765 – 1766	Rabbi of the Great Synagogue	Rabbi appointed by the Great Synagogue
4		Meshullam Solomon	1765 – 1780	Rabbi of the Hambro Synagogue	Appointed in opposition by Hambro and New Synagogues; return to Hamburg confirmed the primacy of David Tevele Schiff
5		Tevele Schiff	1780 – 1791	Chief Rabbi		Died in office
			1791 – 1802	Post vacant
6		Solomon Hirschell	1802 – 1842	Chief Rabbi		Died in office
7		Nathan Marcus Adler	1845 – 1890	Chief Rabbi of the British Empire	Oversaw the creation of the United Synagogue
8		Hermann Adler	1891 – 1911	Chief Rabbi of the British Empire	Appointed delegate Chief Rabbi in 1879 due to failing health of his father	Died in office
9		Joseph Hertz	1913 – 1946	Chief Rabbi of the United Kingdom		Died in office
10		Israel Brodie	1948 – 1965	Chief Rabbi of Great Britain and the Commonwealth	Knighted 1969	Retired
11		Immanuel Jakobovits	1966 – 1991	Chief Rabbi of the United Hebrew Congregations of the Commonwealth	Knighted 1981; Life peer 1988	Retired
12		Jonathan Sacks	1991 – 2013	Chief Rabbi of the United Hebrew Congregations of the Commonwealth	Knighted 2005; Life peer 2009	Retired
13		Ephraim Mirvis	2013 – present	Chief Rabbi of the United Hebrew Congregations of the Commonwealth	Knighted 2023	Currently serving

== See also ==
- Chief Rabbi
- British Jews
- History of the Jews in England
- History of the Jews in Scotland
- History of the Jews in Wales
- History of the Jews in Northern Ireland
