= Nathan Adler (disambiguation) =

Nathan Adler (1741–1800) was a German kabbalist from Frankfurt.

Nathan Adler may also refer to:

- Nathan Marcus Adler (1803–1890), Orthodox Chief Rabbi of the British Empire
- Nathan Adler (psychologist) (1911–1994), American psychoanalyst
- Nathan Adler, a fictional persona created by David Bowie on the album Outside (1995)
- Nathan Niigan Noodin Adler, Canadian horror fiction writer
