= Joseph Schwarz (geographer) =

Jewish geographer, Palestine explorer and rabbi

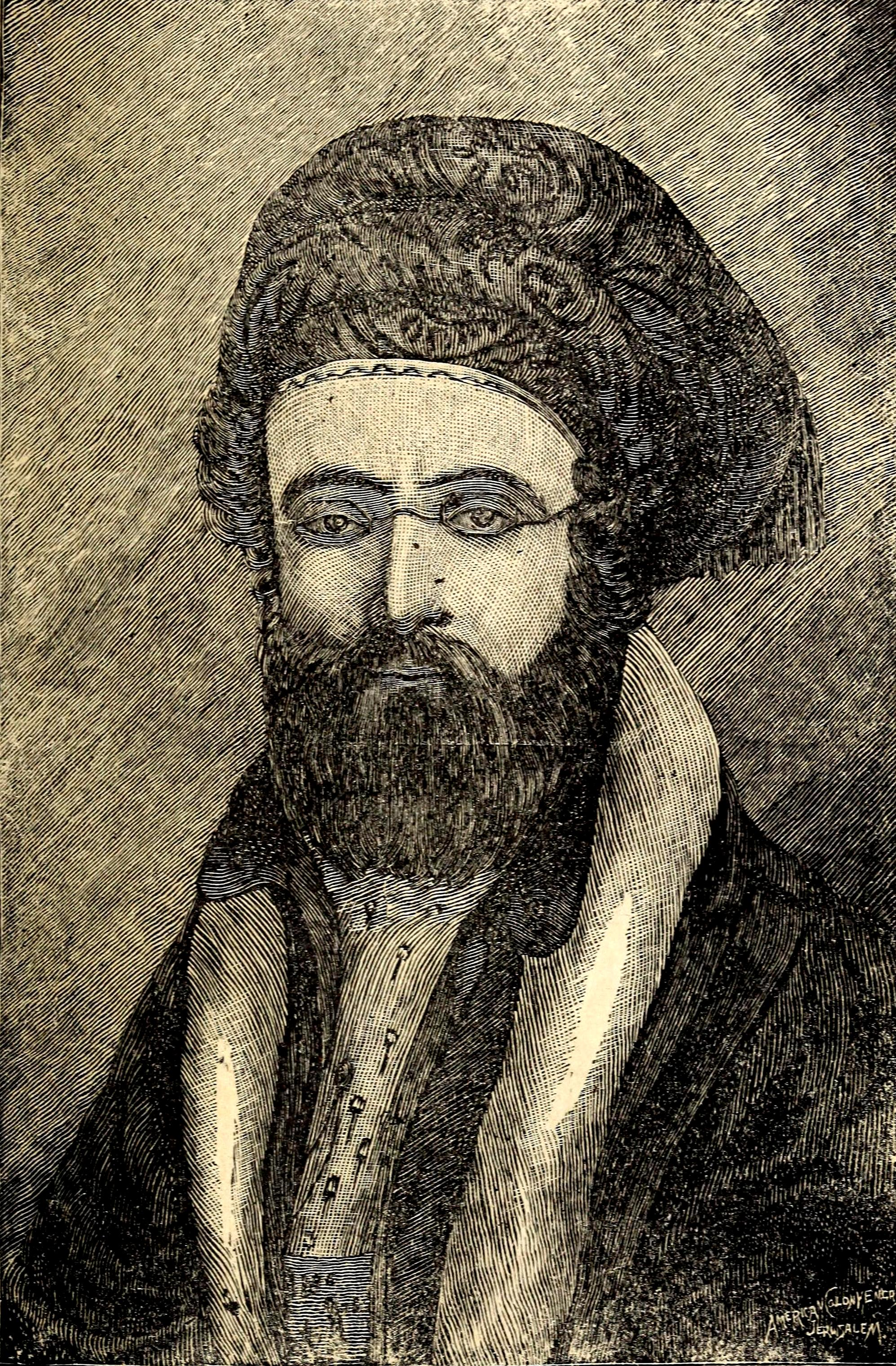
Joseph Schwarz

Rabbi Joseph Schwarz (Hebrew: יהוסף שוורץ; born on October 22, 1804, in Raft; died on February 5, 1865, in Jerusalem) was a Jewish geographer, Palestine explorer and rabbi.

== Biography ==
The Book of the Crops of the Land, Yosef Schwartz, 1900 Jerusalem, Third edition (first edition came out in the year 1900). Click the image to browse the book from page 7

Joseph Schwarz was born in the Jewish ghetto in Raft, the Judenberg. He was the middle of the three sons of Mendel Schwarz, a main sponsor of the elementary school in Raft. The Schwarz family descended from one of the founders of the Jewish community Floss, namely from Eisik Feifas from Neustadt an der Waldnaab. Joseph's brothers were Samuel Schwarz and Hajum Schwarz. Hajum Schwarz was the father of Israel Schwarz, who later edited the main work of his uncle Joseph Schwarz.

Even in his childhood, Schwarz developed an affection for the rabbinical profession. He first studied the Talmud in Schwabach with Rabbi Abraham Wechsler, who was district rabbi in the Schwabach District Rabbinate founded in 1813 from 1820 to 1850. In 1823 he worked as an accountant for the landowner and rabbi Mendel Rosenbaum in Unterzell near Würzburg.

Then he continued his studies for five years at the university and at the Yeshiva in Würzburg, where his older brother Samuel was already studying. The Yeshiva in Würzburg, then led by Rabbi Abraham Bing, tended more towards Orthodox Judaism than towards reform Judaism, which emerged at the beginning of the 19th century. "A large number of students flocked to Würzburg [...] to listen to his learned words. Among the most important were the later Altona Chief Rabbi Jakob Ettlinger, the later London chief rabbi Nathan [Marcus] Adler, the Hamburg Chacham Is.[aak] Bernays, R.[abbi] Elieser Bergmann and [...] Seligmann Bär Bamberger." In Würzburg, Schwarz also studied the geography of Palestine.

At that time he wrote a map of Palestine, which was published in three editions: Würzburg in 1829, Vienna in 1831, Trieste in 1832.

== Trip to Palestine ==
Since his earliest youth, Schwarz had the desire to research the history, geography, geology, flora and fauna of the Holy Land himself on the spot and to work out a correspondence between names, places and terms mentioned in the Bible, Talmud and Midrash with the existing conditions in the 19th century. At that time, there was only one significant Jewish work on this topic, namely kaftor wa-ferach ("Knauf and Flower") by Estori ha-Parchi (1282–1357), who had been traveling Palestine for seven years. Although there were some Christian works about Palestine, they were more interested in specifically Christian points of view.

In 1831 Schwarz left for Palestine. He first traveled to Vienna and from there to Hungary. In Hungary, Schwarz had to wait a whole year because cholera had broken out and the quarantine regulations (Contumaz cordon) prevented him from continuing his journey. From Hungary he travelled on to Fiume on the Mediterranean. There he was stuck for another half a year, because the Orient could not be traveled because of the danger of war. Finally, he reached Jaffa by ship via Smyrna and Rhodes, where he arrived on April 2, 1833. On April 19, 1833, he reached Jerusalem. In Jerusalem, Schwarz was taken in by the famous rabbinical family Luria. He married one of the daughters of the house of Luria.

In 1837, Schwarz was one of the co-founders and then the administrators of Kolel Holland und Deutschland (Kollel Hod), initiated by Lazarus Bergmann, who had made Aliyah in 1834.

== Geographical studies in Palestine ==
Schwarz was a member of the pious Watikin sect. As a result, his first work in Jerusalem was to observe from the Mount of Olives the exact times of sunrise and sunset for each day of the year. The time of sunrise and sunset determines the time for the Watikin's Shma Yisrael prayer. This work was published in Jerusalem in 1843 under the title Tvu'ot Hashemesh (άבואות השמש The Cycles of the Sun).

Schwarz traveled to Palestine for 15 years at his own expense and explored its geography. A thorough knowledge of the local languages helped him in this arduous and often dangerous undertaking. He published the results of these trips in his book Tvu'ot Ha'aretz (άבואות הארר), which was published in Hebrew in Jerusalem in 1845.

In 1849 Schwarz went to the US and took care of the translation and publication of this book there. In addition, he collected donations as a Meshullach for the Kollel Hod. The book was translated into English by Isaac Leeser and published in 1850 under the title A descriptive geography and brief historical sketch of Palestine, by Rabbi Joseph Schwarz, for sixteen years a resident in the holy land. The costs of the publication were borne by the publisher A. Hart.

From the US, Schwarz travelled via London to Germany, where he supervised the translation into German and the publication of his book. In 1852, his book, under the title Das heilige Land: Nach seiner ehemaligen und jetzt geographischen Beschaffenheit was published by the publishing house of the Hebrew antiquarian bookstore of I. Kaufmann, Frankfurt am Main.

The book contains geographical studies that show the names of localities, mountains, countries, rivers, etc., found in the Bible, Talmud and Midrash, not only in Palestine, but also in its surroundings, for example, in Lebanon, which was inhabited in the 19th century. Assign common names in the XIX century. In addition, it also contains explanations of the names of peoples; explanations of the animal kingdom, plant kingdom, mineral kingdom and climate; descriptions of the liturgical, religious and social customs of the Jews in Jerusalem; various legends and sketches on the history of the Jews in Palestine; and descriptions of the Arab population of Jerusalem. At the end of the book there is a detailed register of all occurring place names and other terms in German and Hebrew, a picture of Jerusalem and a map of Palestine.

After 1852, Schwarz returned to Jerusalem. There he continued his studies of the rabbinic scriptures and Kabbalah, and joined the Kabbalistic association Beth-El.

== Gallery ==
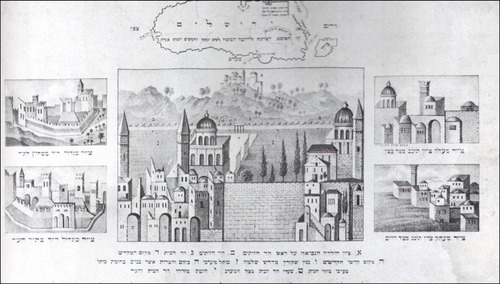
"The Sight of the Temple Place and Jerusalem" (1836–1837)

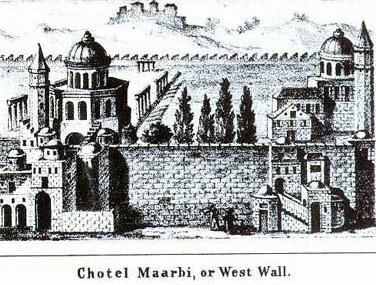
"The Western Wall or Temple Mount", illustration from the English edition of the book "The Crops of the Earth" (1850)

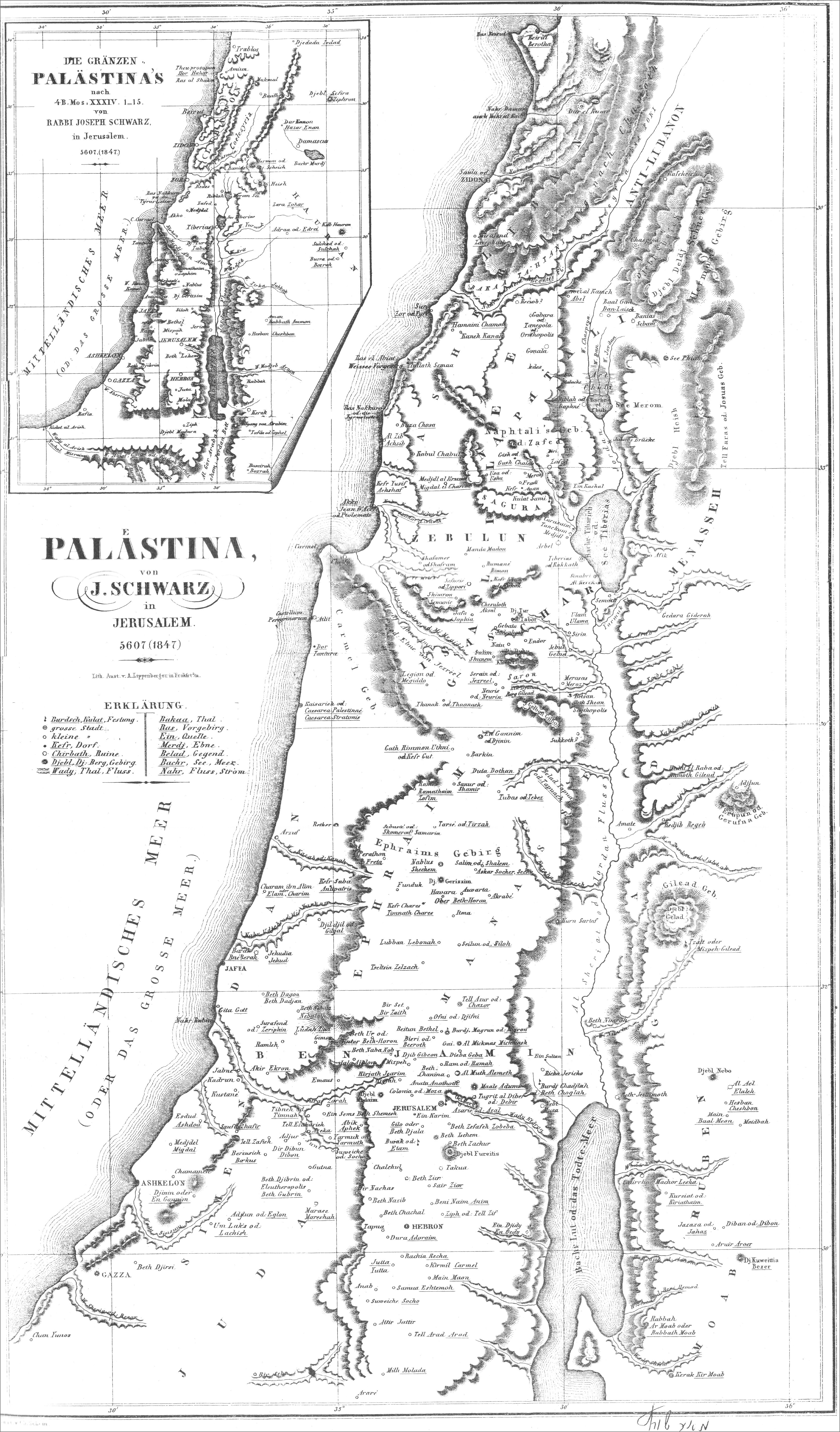
Map of Israel (1847)

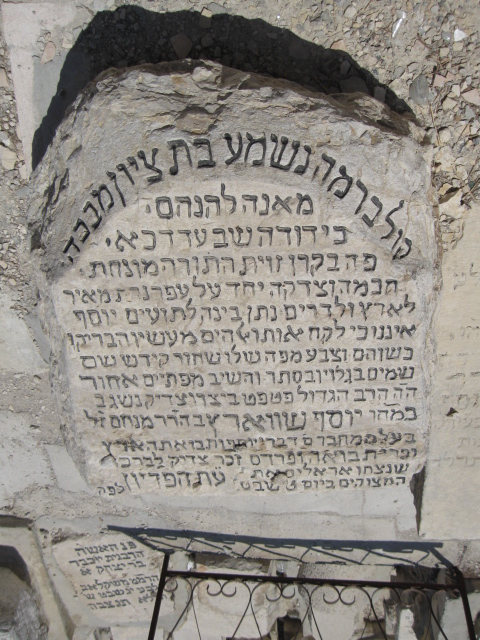
The Tomb of Joseph Schwartz, with an epitaph by Jacob Sapir
