= Nathan Adler =

German kabbalist & rosh yeshiva (1741-1800)

Personal life
- Born: December 16, 1741 Frankfurt, Holy Roman Empire
- Died: September 17, 1800 (aged 58) Frankfurt, Holy Roman Empire
- Spouse: Rachel Cohen

Nathan Adler (1741–1800) was a German Kabbalist and rosh yeshiva. He was responsible for training several prominent rabbis of the era.

== Biography ==
He was born in Frankfurt on December 16, 1741. As a precocious child he won the admiration of Chaim Joseph David Azulai (Chida), who, in 1752, came to Frankfurt to solicit contributions for the poor of the Jewish communities in Eretz Yisrael. Adler attended the rabbinical school of Jacob Joshua, author of Penei Yehoshua, who was at that time rabbi at Frankfurt, but his principal teacher was David Tevele Schiff, afterward chief rabbi of the United Kingdom. In 1761, he established a yeshivah himself, in which several prominent rabbis received their early teachings, notable among whom were Abraham Auerbach, Abraham Bing, rabbi in Würzburg, Sekl Loeb Wormser, and especially Moses Sofer (Schreiber), rabbi in Presburg.

Nathan Adler devoted himself to the study of the Kabbala, and adopted the liturgical system of Isaac Luria, assembling about himself a select community of Kabbalistic adepts. He was one of the first Ashkenazim to adopt the Sephardi pronunciation of Hebrew, and gave hospitality to a Sephardi scholar for two or three years to ensure that he learnt that pronunciation accurately. He prayed according to the Sephardic ritual, pronounced the priestly blessing every day, and in other ways approached the school of the Hasidim, who had at that time provoked the strongest censures on the part of the Talmudists of the old school. His followers claimed that he had performed miracles, and turned visionaries themselves, frightening many persons with predictions of misfortunes which would befall them. Finally, the rabbis and congregational leaders intervened in 1779 and prohibited, under penalty of excommunication, the assemblies in Nathan Adler's house.

Rabbi Nathan, however, paid no attention to these orders. He even excommunicated a man who had disregarded his orders, although this was contrary to the laws of the congregation. His doors remained open day and night and he declared all his possessions to be common property, that thus he might prevent the punishment of those who might carry away by mistake anything with them. Moreover, he commanded Moses Sofer, who had quarreled with his father, never to speak to his parent again. When the same disciple reported to him that he had gone through the whole Talmud, he advised him to celebrate that event by a fast of three days.

In spite of the continued conflict with the congregational authorities, the fame of Rabbi Nathan's piety and scholarship grew, and in 1782 he was elected rabbi of Boskowitz in Moravia. But his excessive and mystical piety having made enemies for him, he was forced to leave his congregation, and in 1785 returned to Frankfurt. As he still persisted in his former ways, the threat of excommunication was renewed in 1789, an act that was not repealed until shortly before his death at Frankfurt on September 17, 1800. His wife, Rachel, daughter of Feist Cohen of Giessen, survived him. He left no children, though Nathan Marcus Adler, Chief Rabbi of the British Empire, may have been named after him.

His mysticism seems to have been the reason for his avoidance of literary publications. The Kabbalists claimed that real esoteric theology should never be published, but should only be orally transmitted to worthy disciples. In his copy of the Mishnah he wrote brief marginal notes, mostly cross-references. Some of them were collected and explained ingeniously by B. H. Auerbach under the title Mishnat Rabbi Natan. One responsum is found among those of Moses Sofer on Yoreh De'ah, 261.

== Works ==
- Mishnat Rabbi Nathan
