= Saul Berlin =

German rabbi (1740–1794)

Saul Berlin (also Saul Hirschel after his father; 1740 at Glogau – November 16, 1794 in London) was a German Jewish scholar who published a number of works in opposition to rabbinic Judaism.

== Early life ==
He received his general education principally from his father, Hirschel Levin, who had served as rabbi of the Great Synagogue of London and as chief rabbi of Berlin. Saul, the eldest son, was given an education in both the Talmud and secular subjects. His brother, Solomon Hirschell, eventually became Chief Rabbi of Great Britain.

Saul Berlin was ordained as a rabbi at age 20. By 1768, aged 28, he had a rabbinic post in Frankfort-on-the-Oder in the Prussian province of Brandenburg. He married Sarah, the daughter of Rabbi Joseph Jonas Fränkel of Breslau.

In Berlin and Breslau (where he frequently went to visit his father-in-law), he came into personal contact with the representatives of the Jewish Enlightenment, and became one of its most enthusiastic adherents.

== Career ==
Berlin began his literary career with an anonymous circular letter, Katuv Yosher (Written Truth) (printed in Berlin, 1794, after the death of the author), which Hartwig Wessely warmly defended in his own contention with the rabbis while pleading for German education among the Jews. Berlin used humor to describe what he viewed as the absurd methods of the Jewish schools, and alleges how the rabbinic casuistry—which then constituted the greater part of the curriculum—injures the sound common sense of the pupils and deadens their noblest aspirations.

He later wrote the pseudonymous work, Mitzpeh Yokt'el (two place-names in Jos. 15:38; by way of pun Mitzpah Yekutiel, "Superseder of Yekutiel") (published by David Friedländer and his brother-in-law Itzig, Berlin, 1789), a polemic against the Torat Yekutiel of Raphael Cohen. The latter, one of the most zealous advocates of rabbinic piety, was a rival candidate with Levin for the Berlin rabbinate, which induced Levin's son to represent Cohen as a forbidding example of rabbinism.

Under the name "Ovadiah b. Baruch of Poland," Berlin attempted in this work to ridicule Talmudic science, and to stigmatize one of its foremost exponents not only as ignorant, but also as dishonest. The publishers declared in the preface that they had received the work from a traveling Polish Talmudist, and had considered it their duty to print it and submit it to the judgment of specialists. To secure the anonymity more thoroughly, Berlin and his father were named among those who were to pass upon it. Berlin's statements, especially his personal attacks against those he disagreed with, undermined his cause. When it reached Altona and Hamburg, where Raphael was chief rabbi, the work and its author was placed under the ban. The dispute that then arose concerning the validity of the ban turned entirely on the question of whether a personal element, like the attack upon the rabbi of Altona, justified such a punishment. Some Polish rabbis supported the ban, while some declared the ban invalid as did Ezekiel Landau, chief rabbi of Prague and a near relation of Berlin. Even the former censured Berlin's actions after circumstances forced him to acknowledge authorship.

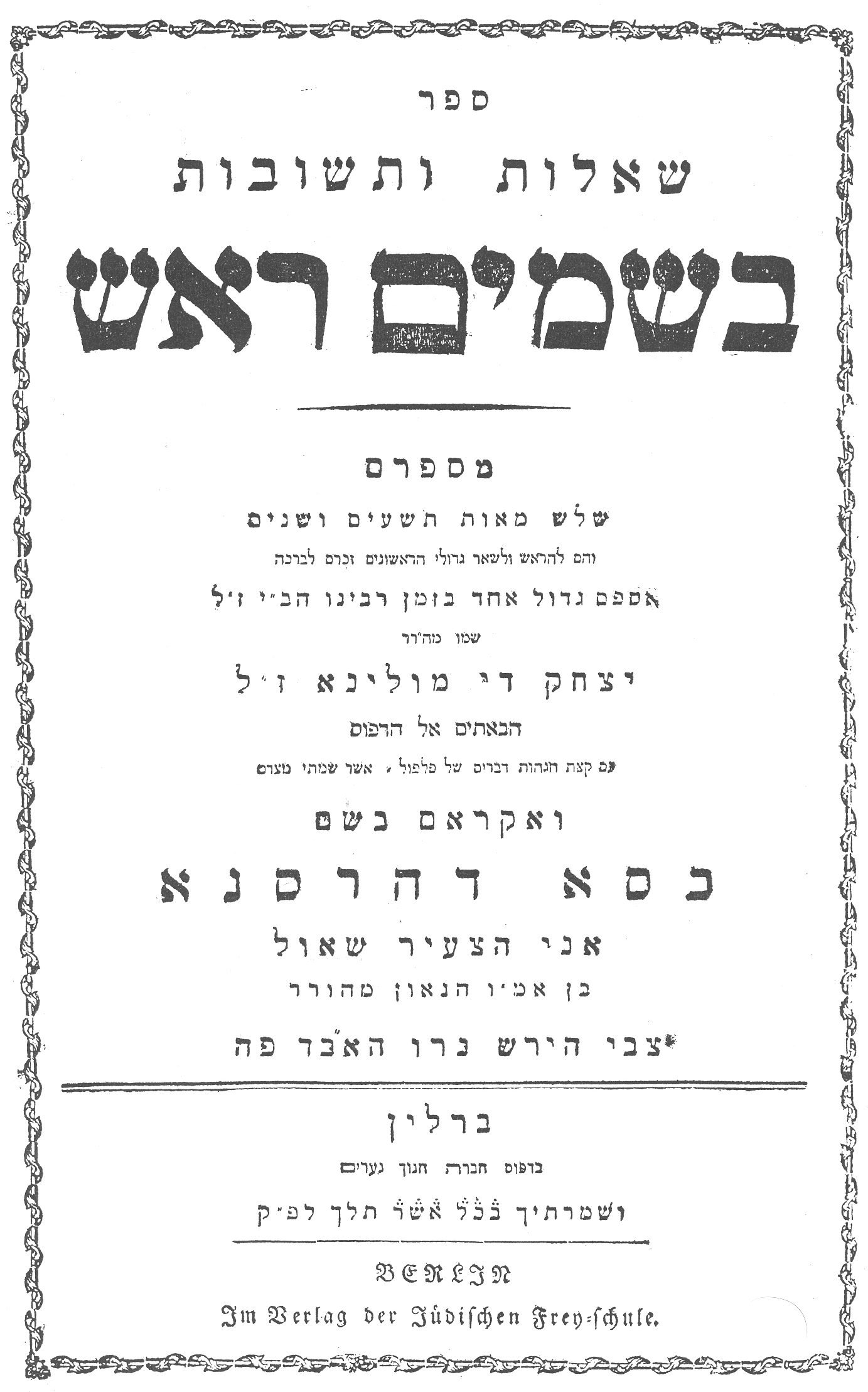
Besamim Rosh, Berlin 1793

Before the excitement over this affair had subsided, Berlin created a new sensation by another work. In 1793 he published in Berlin, under the title "Besamim Rosh" (Incense of Spices), 392 responsa purporting to be by Asher ben Jehiel. Berlin said that the work "Besamim Rosh" had been compiled from Asher ben Jehiel's writings in the sixteenth century by Isaac de Molina. However, rabbinic critics of his day suspected that Berlin had forged the work. Mordecai Benet first attempted to prevent the printing of the book in Austria, and then argued deception in a circular letter addressed to Berlin's father, by critically analyzing the responsa and arguing that they were spurious. Levin tried in vain to defend his son. Berlin resigned his rabbinate and, to end the dispute, went to London where he died a few months later. In a letter found in his pocket, he warned everybody against looking into his papers, requesting that they be sent to his father. He expressed the wish to be buried not in a cemetery, but in some lonely spot, and in the same garments in which he died.

== Besamim Rosh ==
Besamim Rosh (Hebrew: בשמים ראש; lit."Choice Spices") is a work of legal Responsa attributed to Asher ben Jehiel of the thirteenth century, but which is widely considered a forgery composed by Saul Berlin himself. Besamim Rosh was first published in Berlin in 1793. Berlin added glosses and comments that he called "Kassa de-Harsna" (Fish Fare). Yehezkel Landau wrote an approbation. Berlin said that the work "Besamim Rosh" had been compiled from Asher ben Jehiel's writings in the sixteenth century by Isaac de Molina. Some responsa that arouse suspicion in the work are, for instance, responsum No. 251, that states an insight into the principles of the Torah and its commands can not be gained directly from it or from tradition, but only by means of the philosophico-logical training derived from non-Jewish sources. However, Asher ben Jehiel had condemned the study of philosophy and even of the natural sciences as being un-Jewish and pernicious (compare No. 58 of Asher's genuine responsa). "Besamim Rosh" ascribes the following opinions to the neo-Talmudists of the thirteenth century: "Articles of faith [creed] must be adapted to the times; and at present the most essential article is that we all are utterly worthless and depraved, and that our only duty consists in loving truth and peace and learning to know God and His works" (l.c.). One of the controversial responsum in the "Besamim Rosh" stated that the historical Jewish customs against mourning for someone who committed suicide and likewise not burying someone who committed suicide in a Jewish cemetery were not applicable because of the terrible difficulties facing the Jews. In other words, it would be permissible to mourn for someone who committed suicide due to depression. This ruling on laws of mourning for death from suicide from the "Besamim Rosh" would be cited by Ovadia Yosef in a responsum written in Cairo in 1950. Yosef would later also write a haskamah for the 1984 edition of Besamim Rosh. Ovadia Yosef was aware that the work was considered a forgery but determined that there were valuable teachings in it which were of use in deciding Jewish law. Berlin is also alleged to be the author of the two responsa concerning the modification of the ceremonial laws, especially of such that were apparently especially burdensome to the Berlin youth. For instance, it gives permission to Jewish men to shave their beards (No. 18), to drink non-kosher wine, "yayin nesek" (No. 36), and to continue traveling on Friday night if one is in the middle of a journey and can't stop before Shabbat. Berlin aroused a storm of indignation from authorities who accused him of fraudulently using the name of one of the most famous rabbis of the Middle Ages to combat rabbinism. The Sochatchover Rebbe, Avrohom Bornsztain later wrote that it was prohibited to keep the Besamim Rosh in one's home and it was permitted to burn it even on a Yom Kippur that falls on Sabbath.

The exact historicity of "Besamim Rosh" is still disputed, with it being unclear which parts are forgeries. The Besamim Rosh was reprinted in 1881 and 1984, but some of the texts considered most controversial were removed from the later printings of the work.

== Jewish Encyclopedia bibliography ==
- Azulai, Shem ha-Gedolim, ed. Wilna, ii. 20, 21;
- Benet, in Literaturblatt des Orients, v. 53-55, 140-141 (fragment of his above-mentioned letter to Levin);
- Brann, in the Grätz Jubelschrift, 1887, pp. 255–257;
- Carmoly, Ha-'Orebim u-Bene Yonah, pp. 39–41;
- Chajes, Minḥat Kenaot, pp. 14, 21;
- Grätz, Gesch. der Juden, xi. 89, 151-153;
- Horwitz, in Kebod ha-Lebanon, x., part 4, pp. 2–9;
- Jost, Gesch. des Judenthums und Seiner Sekten, iii. 396-400 (a defense of the authenticity of the responsa collection Besamim Rosh);
- Landshuth, Toledot Anshe ha-Shem, pp. 84–106, 109;
- M. Straschun, in Fuenn, Kiryah Neemanah, pp. 295–298;
- Zunz, Ritus, pp. 226–228, who thinks that Isaac Satanow had a part in the fabrication of the responsa.
