= Mordecai Benet =

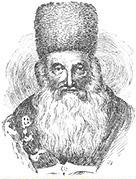
Portrait of Mordecai Benet, from the 1906 Jewish Encyclopedia

Mordecai ben Abraham Benet (Hebrew: מרדכי בן אברהם בנט, also Marcus Benedict; 1753–1829) was a Talmudist and chief rabbi of Moravia.

== Biography ==
He was born at Csurgó, a small village in the county of Stuhlweissenburg, Hungary. As Benet's parents were very poor and consequently unable to engage a teacher, they sent their son when only 5 years old to his grandmother at Nikolsburg. There Gabriel Markbreiter provided for the tuition of the gifted child for a period of 6 years, and then sent him to Rabbi Jacob Pinhas Katzelenbogen who served as Rabbi in Oettingen, Bavaria, which was also a relative of Markbreiter. The latter became Benet's teacher, and took great delight in his pupil's wonderful development. At Benet's Bar Mitzvah (religious majority) celebration his teacher showed the guests, to their great astonishment, three of the boy's manuscripts—a commentary on the Pentateuch, a commentary on the Passover Haggadah, and novellæ on the Talmud.

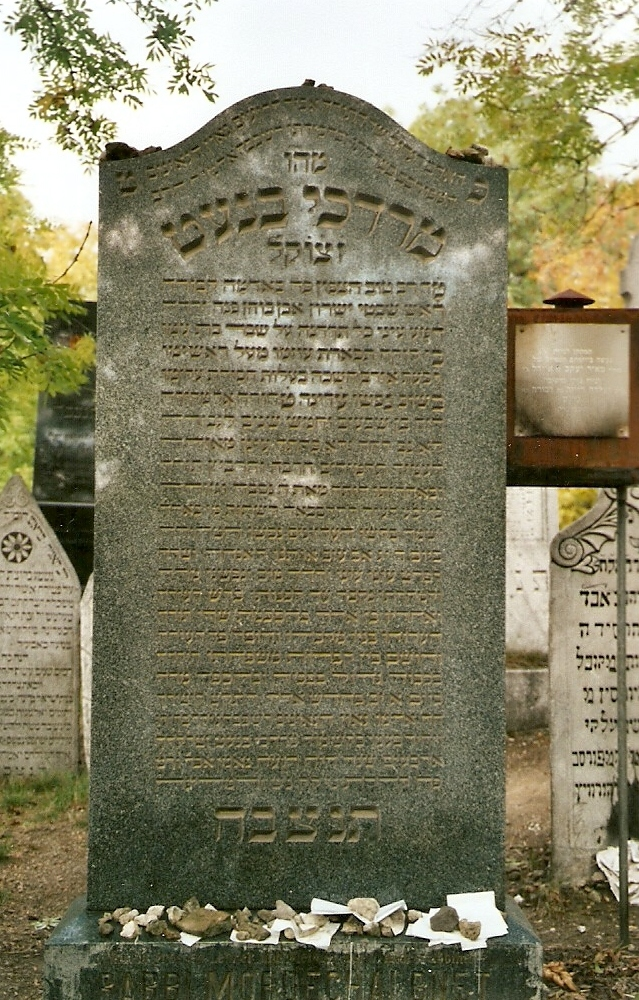
His tombstone, on the Rabbinic Hill at the Jewish cemetery in Mikulov

From his thirteenth to his fifteenth years, Benet devoted himself exclusively to the study of the Bible, with the aid of the Jewish commentaries and of the Haggadah in Talmud and Midrash; his strictly halakhic studies he completed later in the yeshiva of Rabbi Joseph Steinhardt at Fürth, where he remained three years. He then went as a "ḥaber" (senior student) to Prague, where Meïr Karpeles started a private "klaus" for him; though Ezekiel Landau (Noda bihudah) conducted a large yeshiva in the same city, a number of able Talmudists came daily to hear Benet's discourses. After staying at Prague 2 years he married Sarah Finkel (died 1828), the daughter of a prominent well-to-do citizen of Nikolsburg. Here he settled in 1773, and within a year was made ab bet din (ecclesiastical assessor).

Thirteen years later he accepted the rabbinate at Lundenburg in Moravia, which he held for six months, when he resigned to become rabbi at Schossberg, Hungary. His stay in his native country was short, and in 1789 he was appointed rabbi of Nikolsburg and Chief Rabbi of Moravia. Later on he received offers also from Pressburg and Kraków, but yielding to the solicitations of his congregation, he remained at Nikolsburg. Overstudy, however, had brought on a nervous affection in his youth, which clung to him throughout life, and was the cause of his death, which, took place at Carlsbad on 12 August 1829, where he had gone for treatment. His body was buried temporarily at Lichtenstadt, near Carlsbad, but seven months later was permanently interred at Nikolsburg in accordance with his will. The communities of Lichtenstadt and Nikolsburg contended for the honor of interring his mortal remains, and the dispute which later arose over the exhumation of the body was fought with the weapons of learning, and figures in the responsa literature of the time.

Although Benet was independent in his attitude, his learning and high character gained for him many faithful friends among young and old. Even the Hasidim respected him, and Dovber Schneuri, the "middle rabbi" of Chabad, speaks highly of him in a letter. Compare also Weiss, Zikronotai, pp. 77–81. His friend the famed Chasam Sofer who had the highest esteem for him; eulogized him and called him "ben yachid leKudsha Berich Hu" (an only child to God); meaning that no one was his equal.

== Attitude towards reform ==
Moreover, Benet's attitude toward the strict orthodoxy of his friends and colleagues was exceptional, and may be attributed to his knowledge of modern thought (compare his letter to Ẓebi Hirsch Levin in Literaturblatt des Orients, v. 54). These characteristics gave him an independent position in the struggle between orthodoxy and the so-called "spirit of enlightenment."

Frequently Benet showed an insight lacking in his opponents. In his memorial to the government on the education of rabbis, he remarked that if the course of studies which the gymnasium demanded of candidates for all other professions were required of a rabbinical candidate, the latter would be fit for anything except the rabbinate. Still, far from objecting to a secular education for rabbis, as he was understood to do, he favored it; but he thought that a rabbi should first of all possess sufficient knowledge of rabbinical matters; and he proposed that a rabbinical candidate should devote his time chiefly to Jewish subjects until his eighteenth year. His opinions concerning the duties of a rabbi, especially in regard to the instruction of children, show the strong influence that modern views had upon him. He wrote a catechism for religious instruction and submitted it in manuscript to the government. To judge from the letter accompanying it, Benet's views on the education of the young were sensible and in accordance with the spirit of the time.

Nevertheless, Benet, conscientiously opposing the new tendency, declared every reform in religious observance to be wrong and harmful. Thus, in a letter to the government concerning the introduction of German into divine service, he wrote in favor of the preservation of Hebrew. His attitude is significant as, many years later, Zecharias Frankel used the same arguments in the convention of rabbis at Frankfort-on-the-Main, 1845; and events have proved the truth of the prophecy made by Benet, that if the prayers are said in another language few Jews will care to study Hebrew, and familiarity with the Hebrew Scripture will gradually cease.

== His works ==
Although Benet's works are neither numerous nor exhaustive, they are among the classic products of Talmudic literature in the 18th century. They are:

- Biur Mordechai (The Commentary of Mordechai), Vienna, 1813, a commentary on Mordecai ben Hillel's compendium
- Magen Avot (Shield of the Fathers), Zolkiev, 1835, a treatise on the thirty-nine acts prohibited on the Sabbath
- Har haMor (Mountain of Myrrh), responsa, with allusion to the rabbinical explanation of the name "Mordecai" by "Mara dakya" (= pure myrrh)
- Parashat Mordecai (The Explanations of Mordecai), Szigeth, 1889, responsa
- Tekhelet Mordecai (Mordechai's Purple Garment), Lemberg, 1892, halakhic and haggadic discourses

All these works clearly show Benet's keenness, wide knowledge of rabbinical literature, and, what is still more important, his logical and strictly scientific method. In contrast to his friends Moses Sofer and Akiba Eiger, who were casuists, Benet avoided casuistry in discussing involved halakhic questions, gaining his ends by means of a purely critical explanation and a systematic arrangement of the matter. An excellent example of Benet's criticism is his letter to the chief rabbi of Berlin, Tzvi Hirsch Levin, whom he tries to convince of the spuriousness of the collection of responsa Besamim Rosh. This collection was published by Saul Berlin, Levin's son, as the work of Asher ben Jehiel.

Benet's works differ in other respects from those of his contemporaries. His style is clear and elegant, and his language is a pure Hebrew.
