= Great Synagogue of London =

Former Orthodox synagogue in London, England

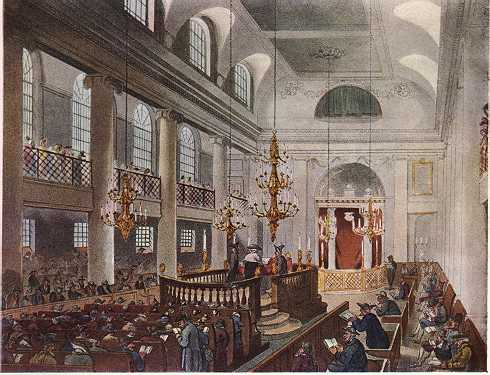
- The Great Synagogue in 1809 (from Ackerman's Microcosm of London)

- Location of the former synagogue in the City of London

Religion
- Affiliation: Orthodox Judaism (former)
- Rite: Nusach Ashkenaz
- Ecclesiastical or organizational status: Synagogue (1790–1941)
- Status: Destroyed (during WWII)

Location
- Location: Dukes Place, City of London, England EC3
- Interactive map of Great Synagogue of London
- Coordinates: 51°30′51″N 0°04′40″W

Architecture
- Architects: George Dance the Elder (1766); James Spiller (1790); John Walen (1852)
- Type: Synagogue architecture
- Founder: Benjamin Levy
- Funded by: Moses Hart (1722); Judith Levy (1790)
- Established: c. 1690
- Completed: 1722; 1790; and 1852
- Destroyed: 11 May 1941

The Great Synagogue of London was a former Orthodox Jewish congregation and synagogue, located in the City of London, England, in the United Kingdom. The synagogue was, for centuries, the centre of Ashkenazi Jewish life in London. Built north of Aldgate in the 17th century, it was destroyed during World War II, in the Blitz.

== History ==
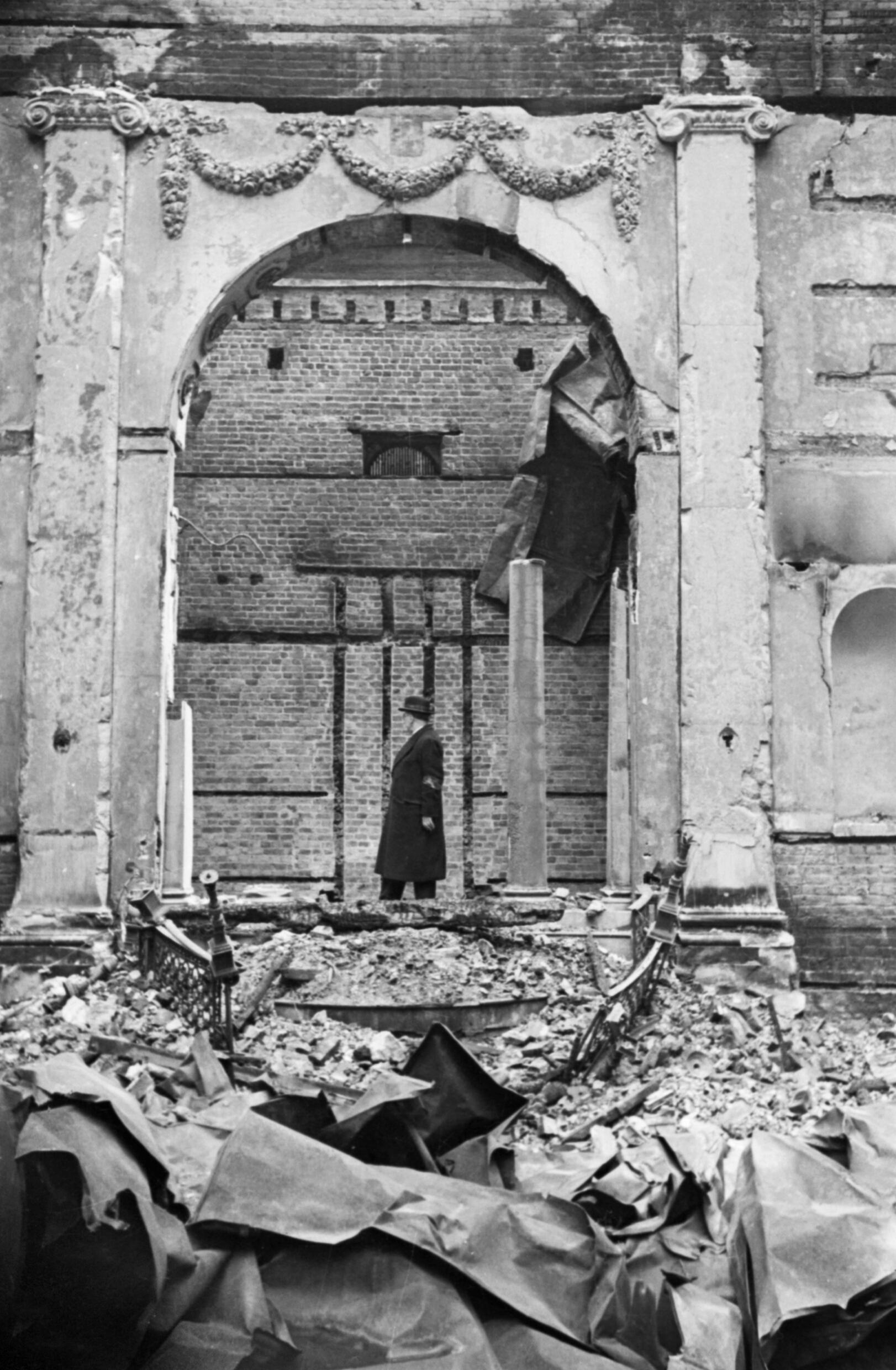
Reverend Hermann Mayerowitsch stands under the decorated arch of the Ark of the Great Synagogue, following the building's destruction

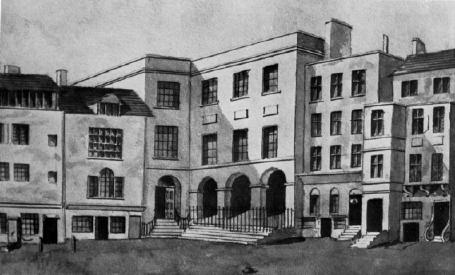
Wash drawing of the Synagogue from Duke's Place, c. 1820

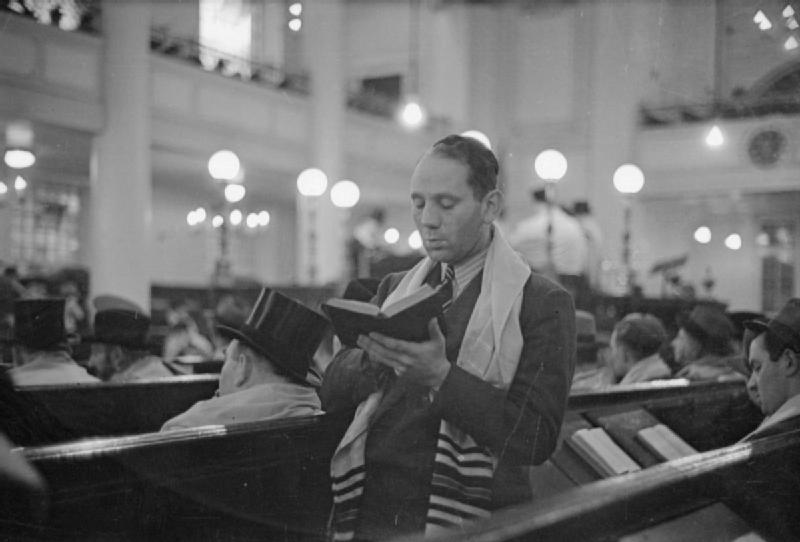
A member of the congregation at the synagogue in 1941

The earliest Ashkenazi synagogue constructed in London, after the return of Jews to England in the 17th century, was built about 1690 at Duke's Place, north of Aldgate, in the City of London. In 1696–7, the synagogue also acquired a burial ground, at Alderney Road.

The congregation grew, and in 1722 a new building was erected with the cost of £2,000 (equivalent to £380,000 in 2025) being borne by businessman and philanthropist Moses Hart. The building was consecrated on Rosh Hashana (18 September 1722). An enlarged building, designed by George Dance the Elder, was consecrated on 29 August 1766. The order of prayers for the inauguration was the first printed publication of the synagogue, and also the first publication to name it explicitly as 'The Great Synagogue'.

Between 1788 and 1790, the third synagogue was built on the site. Unusually for the time, the principal donor was a woman, Judith Levy, a daughter of Moses Hart, who subscribed £4,000 (equivalent to £520,000 in 2025). The architect was James Spiller. The building was in the classical style identified with John Adam. It was redecorated and repaired in 1832 and 1852 by John Walen, and restored again with small renovations in 1899 and 1930.

The Royal Dukes of Cambridge, Cumberland, and Sussex, sons of George III, visited the Great Synagogue of London in 1809. There they were seated on elegant Egyptian revival chairs as they watched the religious service. The synagogue was also visited around this period, during his schooldays, by the writer Leigh Hunt, who wrote 'I took pleasure in witnessing the semi-Catholic pomp of their service and in hearing their fine singing, not without something of a constant astonishment at their wearing their hats'.

The synagogue was destroyed during the night of 10–11 May 1941, during one of the last major attacks of the Blitz. A plaque commemorating the synagogue is placed on Duke's Place.

== Leadership ==
=== Rabbis ===
The following individuals have served as rabbi of the Great Synagogue:

Ordinal	Officeholder	Term start	Term end	Time in office	Notes
1	Judah Loeb Cohen	1696	1700	3–4 years	
−	Aaron the Scribe of Dublin	1700	c. 1704	3–4 years	Acting rabbi
2	Aaron Hart	c. 1704	1756	51–52 years	
3	Hart Lyon	1758	1764	5–6 years	
4	David Tevele Schiff	1765	1792	26–27 years	
−	Moses Myers	1792	1802	9–10 years	Acting rabbi
5	Solomon Hirschell	1802	1842	39–40 years	
6	Nathan Marcus Adler	1845	1890	44–45 years	
7	Hermann Adler	1891	1911	19–20 years	
8	Joseph Hertz	1913	1946	32–33 years	

=== Cantors ===
Myer Lyon was hazzan at the Synagogue from 1767. For some time he also doubled as an opera singer at Covent Garden Theatre under the name 'Michael Leoni'. His rendering of prayers attracted many gentile visitors to the synagogue; amongst them was the Methodist minister Thomas Olivers, who adapted Leoni's rendition of the prayer Yigdal to create the English hymn, The God of Abram Praise; its melody still bears the title Leoni in Hymns Ancient and Modern.

From his arrival in England until his death in 1880 the Anglo-Jewish composer of synagogue music Julius Mombach was associated with the Great Synagogue. He arrived in 1827 as meshorrer (choirboy) and eventually became the Synagogue's choir master.

== In art ==
In 1819 an aquatint of the interior was drawn by Augustus Charles Pugin and Thomas Rowlandson, and originally published in the popular illustrated magazine of the period, Ackermann's Repository of Arts. Pugin drew a handsome representation of the Ionic columns supporting the balconies and the classical decoration of the building. Rowlandson drew caricatures of the congregants, with the hunched shoulders and exaggerated noses traditionally attributed to Jews.

== See also ==
- History of the Jews in England
- List of former synagogues in the United Kingdom
- List of demolished buildings and structures in London
