= Herz Cerfbeer of Medelsheim =

French Jewish philanthropist (1730–1793)

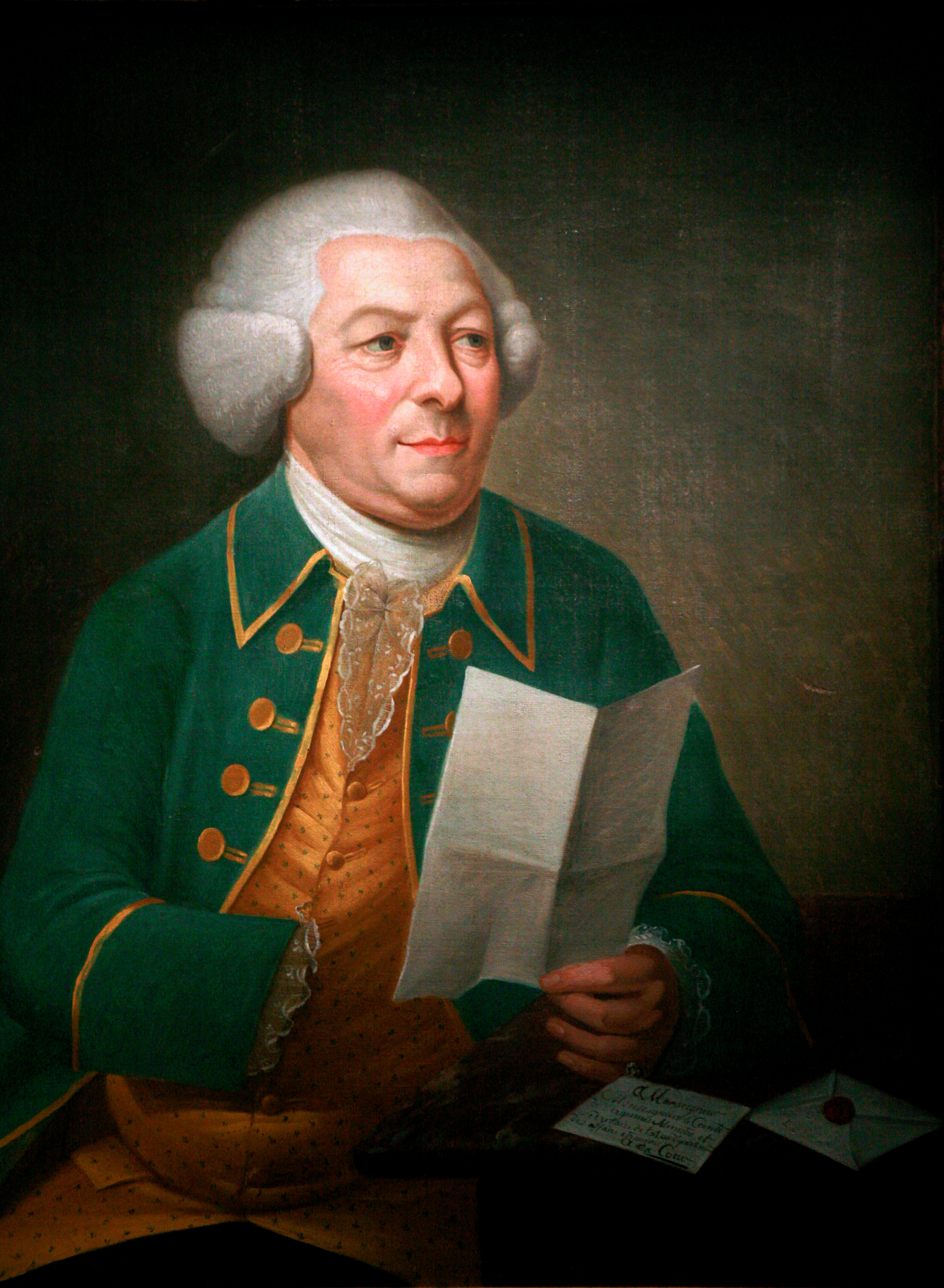
- Portrait of Cerf Beer in the Musée historique de Strasbourg.
- Born: Yiddish: נַפְתָּלִי(־הערץ) בֶּן דּוֹב־בּער; Naphtali Ben Dov-Beer c. 1730; Medelsheim, or Bischheim, Alsace
- Died: December 7, 1793 (aged 63); Strasbourg
- Occupations: Arms dealer, philanthropist

Herz Cerfbeer of Medelsheim (German: Herz Cerf Beer von Medelsheim, born Yiddish: נַפְתָּלִי(־הערץ) בֶּן דּוֹב־בּער Naphtali Ben Dov-Beer, 1730 – December 7, 1793) was a Jewish-Alsatian philanthropist. He was a contractor to the army, and employed his wealth and his influence with the French crown in promoting the material and spiritual welfare of his coreligionists. The government permitted him to settle at Strasbourg, in opposition to the wishes of the authorities of that city, who zealously enforced laws excluding Jews.

Cerfbeer protected all Jews who were willing to earn a livelihood through manual labor. As soon as he had received (in 1775) from Louis XVI the patent granting him the rights of citizenship "for services rendered by him to the government and to the land during the famine of 1770 and 1771," Cerfbeer established factories, where he employed Jews, in order to withdraw them from petty trading, and also to deprive their accusers of all excuse for prejudice.

The Strasburg Germans, who made every effort to prevent the Jews from settling in that city, compelled Cerfbeer to endeavor to obtain from the government the repeal of exceptional laws. A petition to the king was drawn up by Cerfbeer and sent to Moses Mendelssohn for revision. The latter consulted Christian Wilhelm von Dohm, who offered to write an apology for the Jews. This apology, Über die Bürgerliche Verbesserung der Juden, which Cerfbeer energetically spread in France, combined with his personal efforts, brought about the convocation by Malesherbes of a commission to make suggestions for the amelioration of the condition of the Jews in France. Cerfbeer was the leading member of this commission; and the first result of its efforts was the abrogation of the degrading poll-tax.

At the outbreak of the Reign of Terror in France, Cerfbeer was thrown into prison on suspicion of favoring the royal cause, but was set free after a year of confinement.

Being acquainted with the Talmud, Cerfbeer took a great interest in Jewish literature. He supported a yeshiva at Bischheim and published at his own expense rare Hebrew books, among which was the Lechem Setarim of Solomon Nissim Algazi. Wessely wrote a poem in honor of Cerfbeer (in Ha-Meassef, 1786, p. 49), and Abraham Auerbach dedicated to him his poem "Dibre ha-Mekes we-Bittulo."
