= Judith Levy (philanthropist) =

English philanthropist and socialite

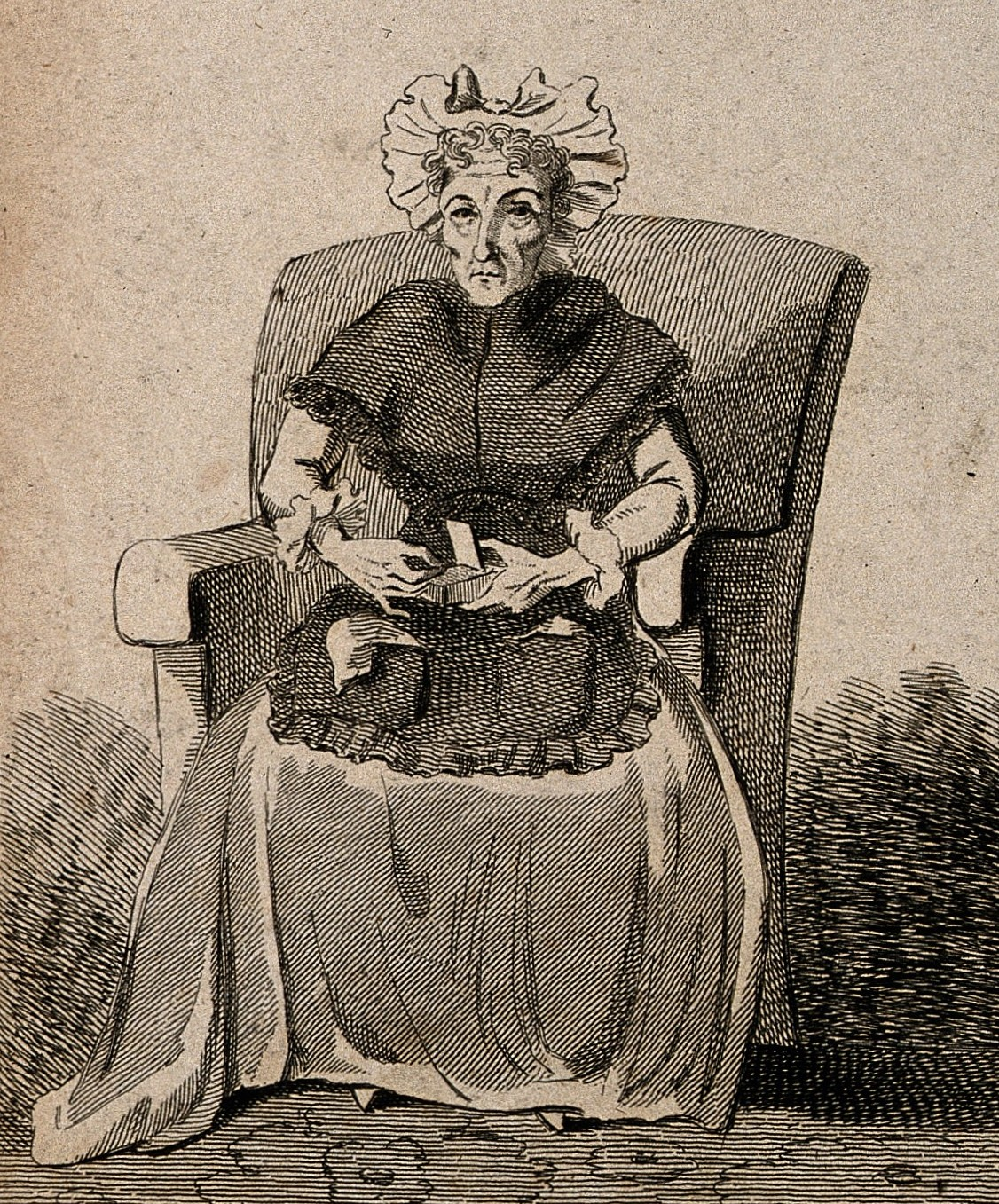
- An etching of Judith Levy, presented along with her 1803 obituary in The New Wonderful Museum
- Born: Judith Hart; 1706; London, England
- Died: 1803 (aged 96–97); England

Judith Levy (née Hart; 1706–1803) was a British philanthropist and socialite.

== Biography ==
Judith Hart was born London in 1706. She was the daughter of Prudence Heilbuth and the German Jewish merchant Moses Hart, who had established the first Ashkenazic Jewish synagogue in London, Duke's Place Synagogue (later the Great Synagogue of London). She married a diamond merchant and military contractor, Elias Levy, in 1727, moving first into Bishopsgate street and then into a mansion on Wellclose Square. There they had two children, a son Benjamin, who died at the age of 22, and daughter Isabella, who would later marry Lockhart Gordon, son of the Earl of Aboyne.

Levy took an active role in the running of the family businesses of her husband and father and, it is said, contributed to their great prosperity. Both her husband and father would die in close succession—1750 and 1756—leaving her to inherit a vast sum of wealth, with an annual income of about £6000 (equivalent to £960,000 in 2023). Five years later Isabella died in childbirth, leaving Levy a widow without close family.

After these tragic events Levy sold her house in Wellclose Square and moved to Albemarle Street, then the centre of London's social life, and later to Richmond Green, becoming known as the Queen of Richmond Green. Her attitude seems to have also changed as she became far more lavish in her spending than the frugality she was previously known for, with local newspapers now printing her movements. However, she also became even more lonely and bitter in her old age, being convinced that anybody who approached her was after her money.

Although she seems not to have participated fully in Jewish communal matters and did not regularly attend the synagogue, she donated regularly to charitable works and gave a gift of £4,000 (equivalent to £640,000 in 2023) for the rebuilding of the Great Synagogue of London so that it could accommodate its growing congregation.

Levy died at 97, on the 18 January 1803 in the arms of one of her cousins, David Wag, who had been depending on her charity. She was interred with full Jewish rites at Mile End. She left no will and her immense fortune of £30,000 (equivalent to £4,780,000 in 2023) went to a relative John Franks, who was also noted for his benevolence, distributing relief to hundreds of needy people without distinction for their religion.
