= Moses Hart (1675–1756) =

English businessman, founder of Duke's Place Synagogue in London

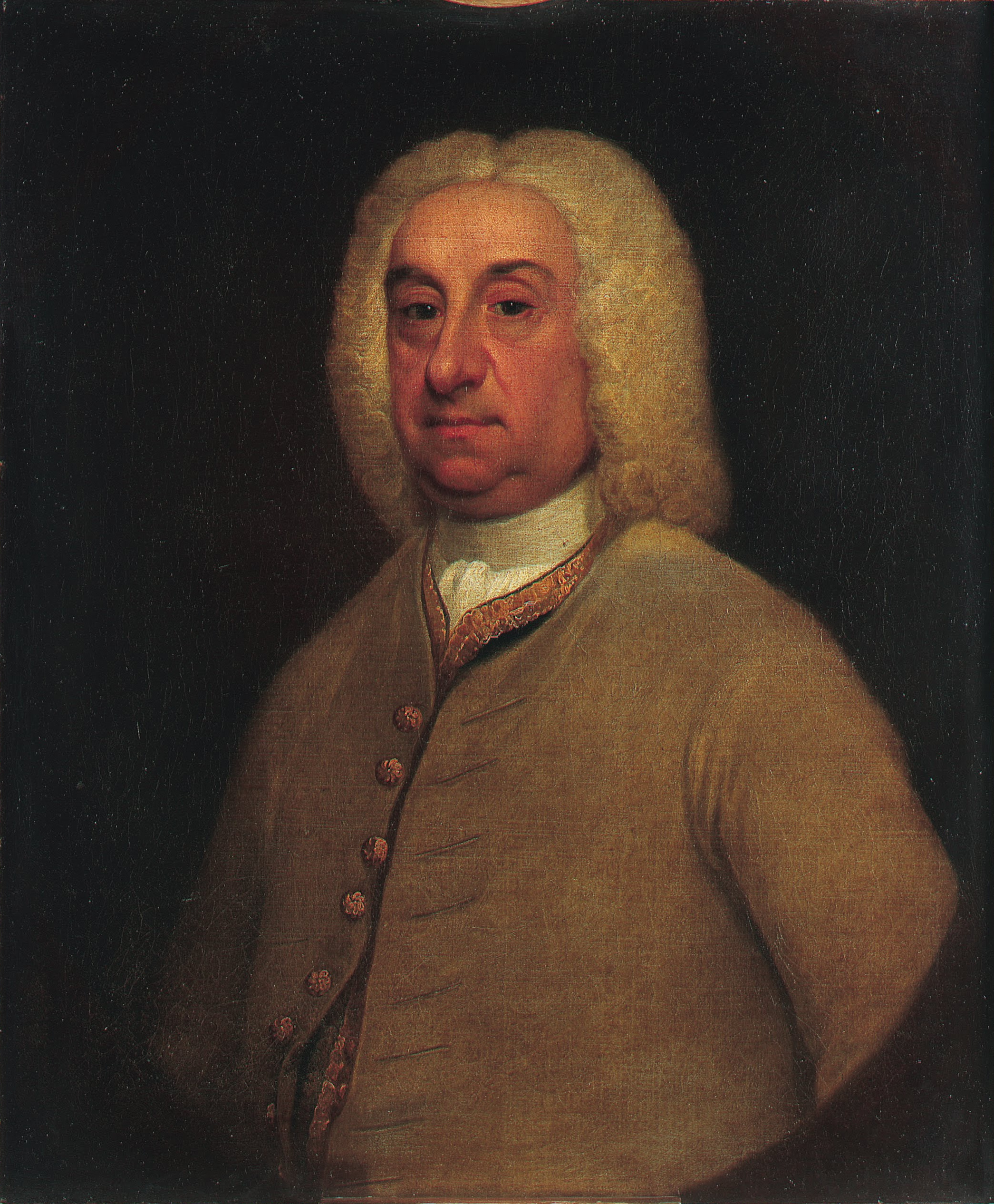
- Born: c. 1675; Breslau, Prussia
- Died: 19 November 1756 (aged 80–81); London, England
- Relatives: Rabbi Aaron Hart (brother); Judith Levy (daughter)

Moses Hart (c. 1675 – 19 November 1756) was a British merchant, financier and philanthropist. Along with his brother, Chief Rabbi Aaron Hart, he was one of the founders of the Ashkenazic Jewish community in England.

During the high-treasurership of Lord Godolphin in the reign of Queen Anne, a government appointment was conferred upon Hart, and thereby he attained to great affluence. In 1722, motivated by religious zeal and by the fact that the London Jewish community had outgrown its temporary house of prayer, Hart contributed a large sum to cover the cost of erecting a permanent building. This was the first building of the Great Synagogue of London; it was inaugurated on New Year's Eve, 1722. In the same year he was recognised as a resident of Great Britain, after he received letters of denization. He and his brother would become involved in petitioning help for Jews across Europe, petitioning George II of Great Britain to intervene in the expulsion of Jews from Prague, which the British government did in 1744. Hart was also part of the campaign to pass the Jewish Naturalisation Act 1753.

Hart married Prudence Heilbuth with who he had six children, among them Judith Levy, the philanthropist. He died on 19 November 1756 and was buried in Alderney Road cemetery.
