= Solomon Hirschell =

British rabbi (1762–1842)

Rabbi Solomon Hirschell
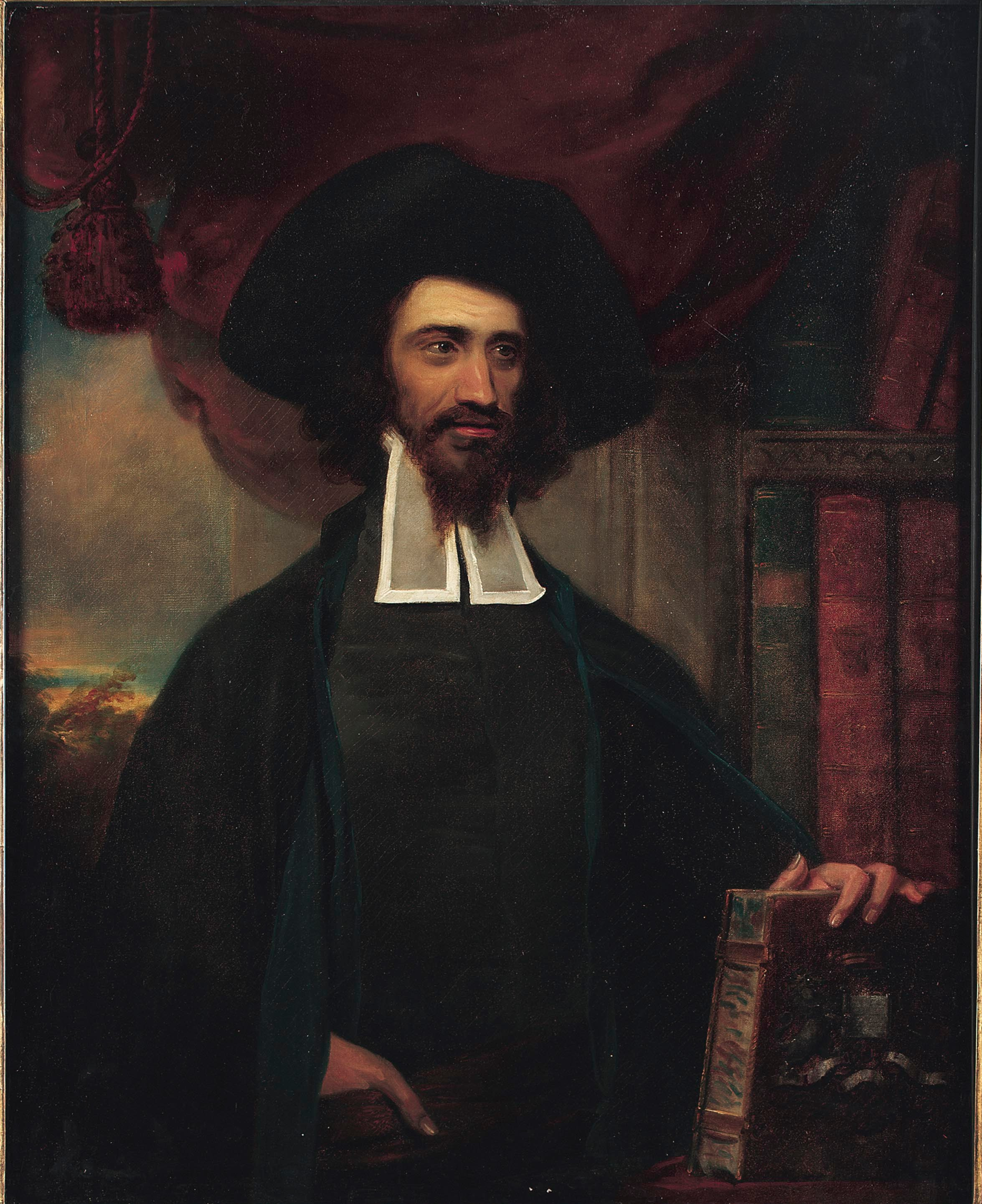
- Rabbi Solomon Hirschell

Chief rabbi of the United Kingdom
- In office 1802–1842
- Preceded by: Tevele Schiff
- Succeeded by: Nathan Marcus Adler

Personal life
- Born: 12 February 1762 London, England
- Died: 31 October 1842 (aged 80) London, England
- Resting place: Brady Street Cemetery
- Parent: Hirschel Levin (father)
- Occupation: Rabbi
- Relatives: Saul Berlin (brother)

Religious life
- Religion: Judaism

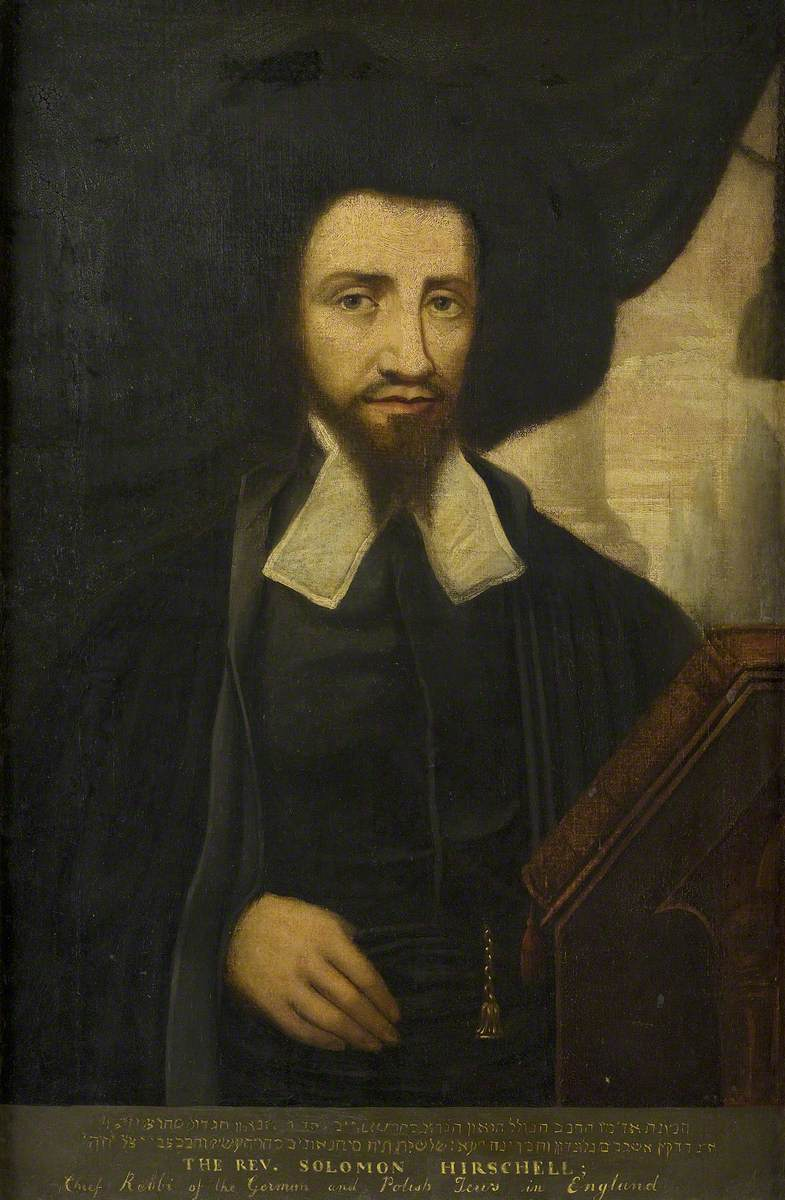
Portrait of Hirschell

Solomon Hirschell (12 February 1762 – 31 October 1842) was a British rabbi who served as the chief rabbi of the United Kingdom from 1802 to 1842. He is best known for his unsuccessful attempt to stop the spread of Reform Judaism in Britain by excommunicating its leaders.

Hirschell's father was a Polish Jew from Galicia, Hirschel Levin, Chief Rabbi of London and Berlin and a friend of Moses Mendelssohn. His older brother was the Talmudist Saul Berlin. He died on 31 October 1842 (27th of Cheshvan 5603), and was buried in the Brady Street Cemetery near Whitechapel in East End of London.

Jewish titles
Preceded by Tevele Schiff	Chief rabbi of the United Kingdom; 1802–1842	Succeeded by Nathan Marcus Adler
