= Abraham Auerbach =

German rabbi (mid-1700s–1846)

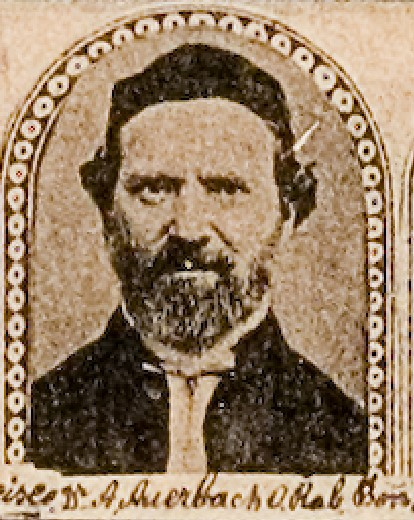

Personal life
- Born: mid-1700s Bouxweiler, Alsace, France
- Died: November 3, 1846 Bonn, Rhine Province, Prussia
- Children: Benjamin Hirsch Auerbach

Religious life
- Religion: Judaism

Abraham Auerbach (mid-1700s – November 3, 1846) was a German rabbi.

A descendant of an old rabbinical family, he was destined from his childhood for the rabbinate, and was educated first by his grandfather at Worms, and later by his uncle, Joseph David Sinzheim, subsequently president of the Central Consistory at Paris. Under the latter's direction, Auerbach acquired not only extensive Talmudic knowledge, but a secular education as well. When, owing to the efforts of Herz Cerfbeer of Medelsheim, a Jewish community had been formed at Strasbourg, Auerbach was charged with its administration.

At the outbreak of the Reign of Terror in France, Auerbach, on account of his connection with Cerfberr (who as former contractor to the royal army was suspected by the revolutionists), was thrown into prison where he remained for a year. On leaving Strasbourg he was appointed rabbi at Forbach, then at Neuwied, and in 1809 at Bonn. In 1837, he resigned the position, ostensibly on account of his great age, but really to have his son succeed him in his place.

Auerbach was the author of several liturgical poems and prayers, and of a poem on the abolition of the poll tax, entitled Dibre ha-Mekes we-Beṭuloh (History of the Tax and its Abolition), still extant in manuscript. The poem was dedicated to Cerfbeer, who by his intervention brought about the abolition. A specimen of the poem was given by Samuel Joseph Fuenn, who was the possessor of the manuscript.

Auerbach left seven sons, among whom the best known was Benjamin Hirsch Auerbach, rabbi at Darmstadt and Halberstadt.
