= Abraham Bing =

Chief rabbi of Würzburg

Personal life
- Born: 1752
- Died: 1841 (aged 88–89)

Religious life
- Religion: Judaism

Abraham Bing (1752–1841) was the Oberrabbiner (Chief Rabbi) of Würzburg, and a Rosh yeshiva there. He trained several prominent German rabbis.

== Biography ==
Bing received his rabbinic training from the talmudist and kabbalist Nathan Adler. (The latter trained, amongst others, Moses Sofer).

From 1769 to 1778, he served as "Klaus" rabbi (rabbi of a small synagogue) in the town of Offenbach am Main. Between 1778 and 1796, he served as dayan (rabbinical judge) in Frankfurt, and from 1796 to 1814 he served as rabbi of the town in Heidingsfeld, near Würzburg (Bavaria). In 1813 he was able to overturn a previous 250-year-old decree banning Jews from settling in Würzburg proper, and in 1814 he assumed the rabbinate of the city, where he also served as the head of a large yeshiva (rabbinic seminary). He was an opponent of the nascent Reform movement.

Several of his pupils played a major role in nineteenth century Orthodoxy in Germany and abroad:

- Nathan Marcus Adler (chief rabbi of the United Kingdom and author of Netinah la-Ger)
- Seligman Baer Bamberger (rabbi of Würzburg, founder of the Würzburg teachers' seminary)
- Isaac Bernays (rabbi in Hamburg and teacher of Samson Raphael Hirsch and Azriel Hildesheimer)
- Jacob Ettlinger (editor of Der Treue Zionswachter, teacher of Samson Raphael Hirsch and Azriel Hildesheimer and author of Aruch la-Ner)
- Jakob Löwenstein (author and rabbi in Baden)
- Abraham Rice (rabbi in Baltimore, Maryland)
- David Seligmann Weisskopf (rabbi of Wallerstein District, founder of Wallerstein yeshiva)

Rabbi Abraham Bing died in Würzburg in 1841, having resigned from the rabbinate two years earlier. Of his writings, only Zichron Avraham (Remembrance of Abraham) was printed (posthumously, edited by Bamberger).

His son, Issochor (Isachar) Abraham Baer Bing (1777–1878) was a writer and cloth merchant. His grandson, Salomon Bernhard Bing (1816–1878), was a cloth dyer and later a wealthy hops merchant. His great-grandsons were Ignaz Bing (1840–1918) and Adolf Bing (1842–1915), the co-cofounders of the large Bing Brothers enamelware and toy company in Nuremberg; Ignaz was also a writer, naturalist, and cave explorer.
