= Hermann Adler =

Chief Rabbi of the British Empire

Rabbi Hermann Adler CVO
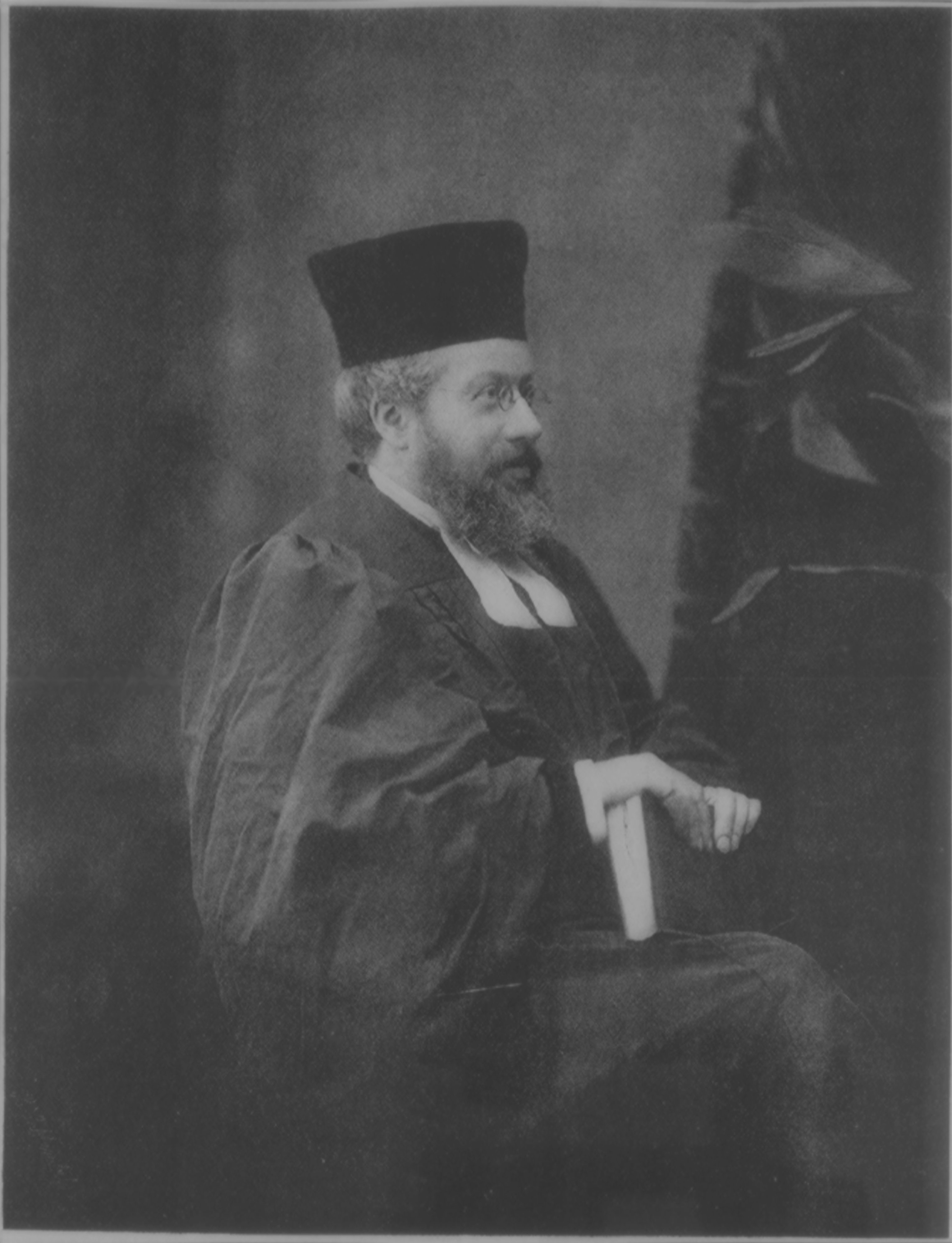
- Hermann Adler, by H. S. Mendelssohn c. 1900
- Title: Chief Rabbi of the United Hebrew Congregations of the Commonwealth

Personal life
- Born: 30 May 1839 Hanover, Kingdom of Hanover, German Confederation
- Died: 18 July 1911 (aged 72) London, England
- Buried: Willesden United Synagogue Cemetery
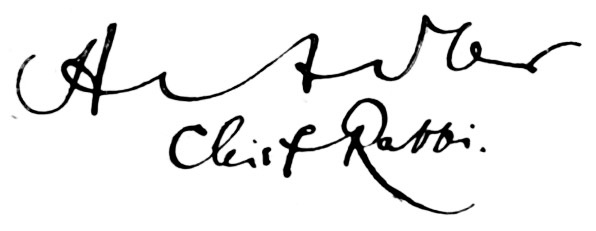
- Signature

Religious life
- Religion: Judaism

Jewish leader
- Predecessor: Nathan Marcus Adler
- Successor: Joseph Hertz
- Synagogue: Bayswater Synagogue
- Position: Chief Rabbi
- Organisation: United Hebrew Congregations of the Commonwealth
- Began: 1891
- Ended: 1911

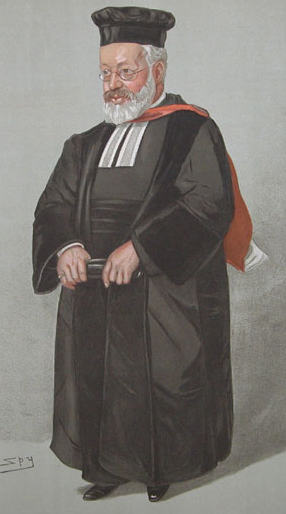
Adler caricatured by Spy for Vanity Fair, 1904

Hermann Adler HaKohen CVO (30 May 1839 – 18 July 1911; Hebrew: נפתלי צבי הירש הכהן אדלר) was the Chief Rabbi of the British Empire from 1891 to 1911. The son (and successor as Chief Rabbi) of Nathan Marcus Adler, the 1911 Encyclopædia Britannica writes that he "raised the position [of Chief Rabbi] to one of much dignity and importance."

== Biography ==
Naftali (Hermann) Adler was born in Hanover. Like his father, he had both a rabbinical education and a university education in Germany, and like him he subscribed to a modernised orthodoxy. He attended University College School in London from 1852 to 1854 and rabbinical college in Prague. He graduated from Leipzig in 1862 with a PhD. He received his semikha (Rabbinic ordination) from Rabbi Solomon Judah Loeb Rapoport. He later received honorary degrees from Scottish and English universities, including Oxford.

== Rabbinic career ==
He was head of the congregation of Bayswater Synagogue, Paddington, during his father's lifetime, and his father's assistant from the time his father's health began to deteriorate in 1879, before succeeding him on his death in 1891.

In 1892 a new headquarters of the Dublin Hebrew Congregation was established. The building was consecrated by Adler who declared "Ireland is the only country in the world which cannot be charged with persecuting Jews".

In 1909 he was appointed a Commander of the Royal Victorian Order (CVO).

Once he was having a lunch with British Catholic cardinal Herbert Vaughan. The cardinal asked the rabbi "Now, Dr. Adler, when may I have the pleasure of helping you to some ham?" The rabbi responded: "At Your Eminence's wedding".

Adler wrote extensively on topics of Anglo-Jewish history and published two volumes of sermons. He was a vigorous defender of his co-religionists and their faith, as well as their sacred scriptures.

He is buried in the Willesden United Synagogue Cemetery in London.

== See also ==
- List of British Jews

Jewish titles
Preceded by Nathan Marcus Adler	Chief Rabbi of Great Britain; 1891–1911	Succeeded by Joseph Herman Hertz
