= Tevele Schiff =

British rabbi

Chief Rabbi Tevele Schiff
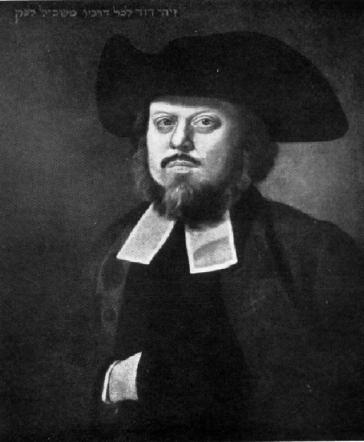

Chief Rabbi of Great Britain
- In office 1765–1791
- Preceded by: Hirschel Levin
- Succeeded by: Solomon Hirschell

Personal life
- Born: David Tevele Schiff
- Died: 17 December 1791 London, England
- Occupation: Chief Rabbi

Religious life
- Religion: Judaism
- Synagogue: Great Synagogue of London
- Position: Chief Rabbi

Chief Rabbi David Tevele Schiff (Hebrew: דוד טעבלי שיף; died 17 December 1791; or, in the Hebrew calendar, 26 Kislev 5551) was the chief rabbi of Great Britain and the rabbi of the Great Synagogue of London from 1765 until his death.

Rabbi Schiff was a disciple of Rabbi Jacob Joshua Falk, author of the Classic Commentary on the Talmud Penei Yehoshua. He was a contemporary of Rabbi Yechezkel Landau, Prague's Chief Rabbi and author of the fundamental Responsae Noda B'Yehuda. His most famous disciple was Rabbi Nosson Adler of Frankfurt-am-Main, famous for his Kabbalistic teachings.

Rabbi Schiff's resting place is at Britain's first Ashkenazic cemetery since the expulsion of Jewry in medieval times. It is situated at 27 Alderney Road, London E1 4EG, in London's East End.

Jewish titles
Preceded by Hirschel Levin	Chief rabbi of Great Britain; 1765–1791	Succeeded by Solomon Hirschell
