= Aaron Hart (rabbi) =

First chief rabbi of Great Britain (1670–1756)

Rabbi Aaron Hart
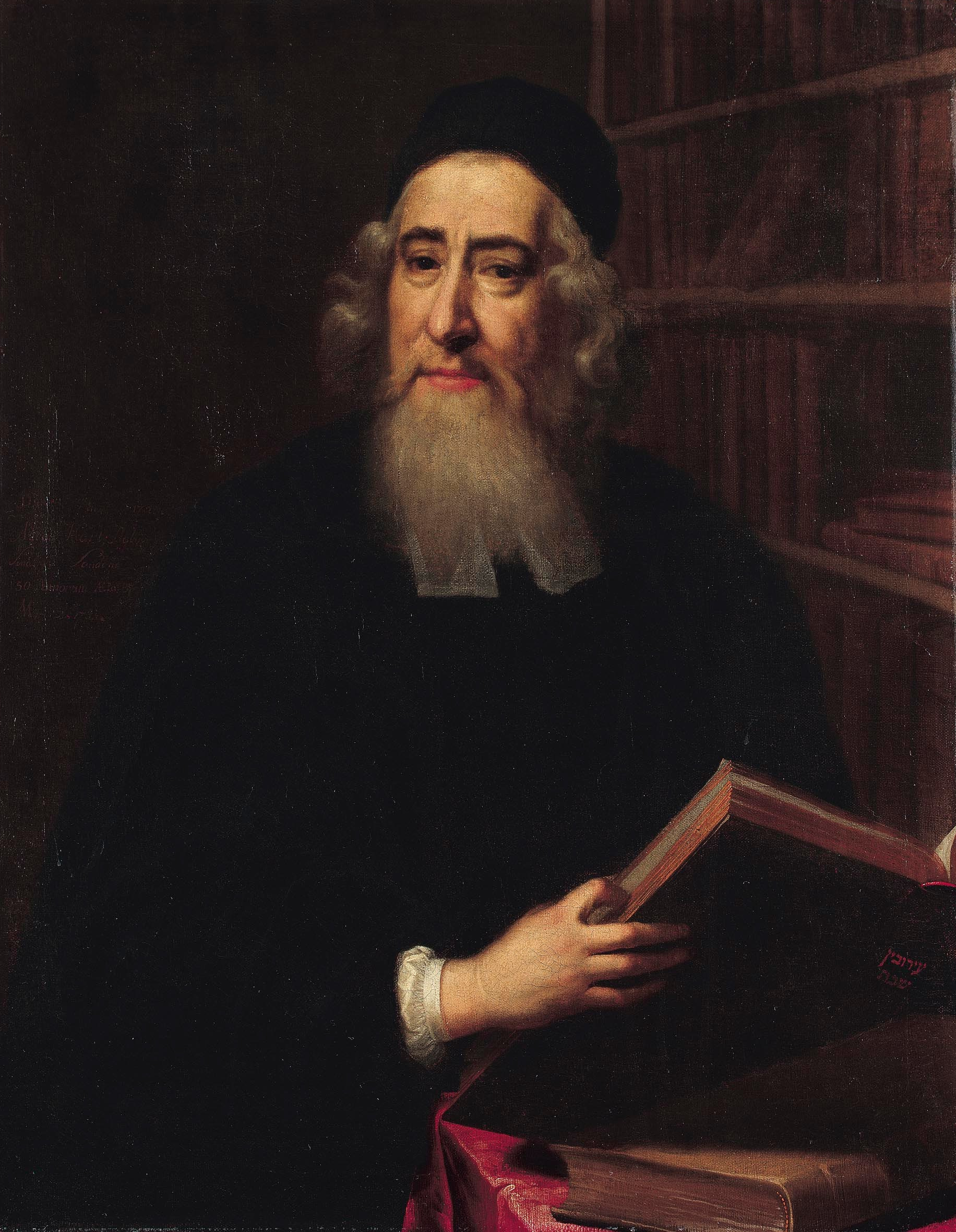
- Title: Rabbi of the Great Synagogue

Personal life
- Born: Aaron Uri Phoebus Hart; 1670 Breslau, Silesia, Holy Roman Empire
- Died: 1756 (aged 85–86) London, United Kingdom

Religious life
- Religion: Judaism

Jewish leader
- Predecessor: Judah Loeb ben Ephraim Anschel (Cohen or Ha-Kohen) / Aaron the Scribe of Dublin (temp., c. 1700–1704)
- Successor: Hart Lyon
- Position: Chief Rabbi
- Synagogue: Great Synagogue of London
- Began: 1704 or 1705
- Ended: 1756

Rabbi Aaron Uri Phoebus Hart (Hebrew: רבי אהרן אורי פײבוש הרט, romanized: Aharon Uri Feibush Hart; 1670 – 1756) was a British rabbi, who served as spiritual leader of the Ashkenazi Great Synagogue of London from 1704 until his death. He is widely regarded as the first chief rabbi of Great Britain.

== Biography ==
He was born in Breslau, Silesia, to Hartwig Moses Hart (also known as Naphtali Hertz of Hamburg) who was a rabbi at Breslau and later at Hamburg. After studying at a yeshiva in Poland, he married the daughter of R. Samuel ben Phoebus of Fürth, author of the Beit Shmuel, a commentary on Eben ha'Ezer.

In 1704 or 1705 he was appointed rabbi of the first Ashkenazic synagogue in London, probably through the influence of his wealthy brother, Moses Hart, founder and parnas of the Great Synagogue, Duke's place, London; and one of the communities two most powerful individuals. Some point to the other of the two most powerful individuals: Abraham of Hamburg (also known as Reb Aberle) a gem dealer, who used his considerable rabbinical knowledge to intimidate the community's spiritual leaders. According to Rubinstein & Jolles: "He almost certainly engineered the downfall of Rabbi Judah Loeb ben Ephraim Anschel in order to replace him with Rabbi Aaron Hart." (Note: "Anschel's tenure ended in when his prayer shawl was found to lack one of its obligatory fringes, something he should have noticed, and which threw doubt on the validity of the prayers he said while wearing it. The garment was rumoured to have been deliberately damaged by the synagogue's shammas (beadle), acting on Abraham of Hamburg's instructions, in order to secure Anschel's departure and put Aaron Hart, more congenial to Abraham, in his place. Whatever the truth, the humiliated Anschel resigned, and became rabbi to the Rotterdam community.")

In 1706 Hart's approval of a controversial divorce (Note: The divorce was done in a highly secretive manner for a wealthy merchant and gambler named Asher Ensel Cohen (or Katz), who was running away from creditors and wanted a conditional divorce that would take effect if he neither returned nor wrote. The divorce proceedings were so questionable that Hart used the services of the Sephardic scribe rather than his own.) was criticized by a member Marcus (Mordechai) Moses, whom Abraham of Hamburg (almost certainly with Hart's approval) had previously prevented from opening a small beth midrash. Rabbi Hart responded by excommunicating Moses based on a 12th-century ruling which he claimed authorized him to do so. (Note: According to Gow: "Hart initially offered mediation, but then excommunicated Marcus Moses under pressure from Abraham." However, Ruderman is more critical writing: "Rabbi Hart responded rashly by excommunicating Moses for daring to question his rabbinic prerogative to issue divorces. The herem (writ of excommunication) of Rabenu Tam (c. 1100–71) could be applied as just punishment, so he claimed, for Moses' insubordinate behaviour. Just as the medieval sage had violently attacked any scholars who had refused to accept his exclusive authority in matters of Jewish law, so too did Rabbi Hart presumptuously claim a similar status as a legal authority. He had no qualms about the hardship the herem would cause Moses and his family, threatening his livelihood through social and economic ostracism from the community.")

Moses turned to other Rabbis who agreed that his excommunication should not stand. Rabbis including Tzvi Ashkenazi and others expressed outrage, criticizing Hart's impetuous and excessive punishment. However, Abraham of Hamburg prevailed on the weak-willed Hart to maintain the excommunication. Moses was forced to start a rival synagogue, later known as the Hambro synagogue. (Note: An excommunication on members of the Hambro synagogue was not lifted until 1750.)

In 1707, Hart published a defense of his position titled Urim ve-Tummim. It is notable for being the first book printed entirely in Hebrew in London. Rabbi Jochanan Holleschau, one of the Rabbis that sided with Moses, wrote a rebuttal called Ma'aseh Rav.

A portrait of Rabbi Hart hangs in the National Portrait Gallery in London.

== Notes ==
Jewish titles
Preceded by New creation	Rabbi of the Great Synagogue; 1704–1756	Succeeded by Hart Lyon
