= Nathan Marcus Adler =

British rabbi (1803–1890)

Chief Rabbi Nathan Marcus Adler
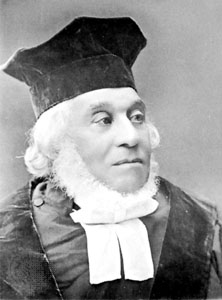
- Title: Chief Rabbi of the British Empire

Personal life
- Born: 13 January 1803 Hanover, Electorate of Hanover
- Died: 21 January 1890 (aged 87) Brighton, United Kingdom
- Resting place: Willesden United Synagogue Cemetery

Religious life
- Religion: Judaism

Jewish leader
- Predecessor: Solomon Hirschell
- Successor: Hermann Adler
- Position: Chief Rabbi
- Began: 13 October 1844
- Ended: 21 January 1890

Painting of Nathan Marcus Adler (19th century, Kempf, The Jewish Museum, London)

Nathan Marcus HaKohen Adler (13 January 1803 – 21 January 1890) (Hebrew name: Natan ben Mordechai ha-Kohen) was the Chief Rabbi of the British Empire from 1845 until his death.

== Life ==
A kohen, Adler was born in Hanover in present-day Germany. His father, Mordecai (Marcus) Baer Adler, was Chief Rabbi of the city. He was named after the kabbalist Nathan Adler.

He studied classics and modern languages, including English and French, at the University of Würzburg; his doctorate in philosophy was from the University of Erlangen in 1828. He studied Torah under his father and received semikhah (rabbinic ordination) from Rabbi Abraham Bing, Chief Rabbi and Rosh Yeshiva of Würzburg, in 1828. He subscribed to what was known as the Frankfurter Orthodoxy.

While a rabbi in Hanover, he became acquainted with Prince Adolphus, Duke of Cambridge, Viceroy of the Kingdom of Hanover (until 1837, a monarchy in personal union with the U.K.), who may have recommended him for the post of Chief Rabbi in Britain.

Out of 13 candidates, mainly from Germany, he made the shortlist of four for the post of Chief Rabbi of the British Empire. The three others were: Samson Raphael Hirsch, Benjamin Hirsch Auerbach, and Hirsch Hirschfeld. With 135 communities voting—having one vote each—on 1 December 1844, Adler received 121 votes, Hirschfeld 12, and Hirsch 2. His distant relative Jacob Adler, who made his acquaintance in the winter of 1883–1884, described him as the "highest religious authority not only of London Jews but of all Orthodox Jews throughout the United Kingdom and the Empire."

The first university-educated British Chief Rabbi and the first to undertake regular pastoral tours within the United Kingdom, he was also a founder of the National Society for the Prevention of Cruelty and Better Protection of Children. His period as Chief Rabbi saw the completion of the emancipation of Jews within the United Kingdom, the election (1847) and seating (1858) of Lionel de Rothschild as the first Jewish member of parliament; Nathan Mayer Rothschild's ascent as the first Jewish member of the House of Lords (1885); and Sir David Salomons's term as the first Jewish Lord Mayor of London (1855). Adler was instrumental in bringing together the United Synagogue, established by an Act of Parliament in 1870. As of 2006, this remains the largest religious grouping within the British Jewish community and takes its religious authority from the Chief Rabbi.

Adler is buried at the US (United Synagogue) cemetery in Willesden.

=== Legacy ===
Adler Street, in London E1, was named after him; the Jewish Institute—a reading room—and two synagogues formerly stood there until the area was destroyed in The Blitz.

His eldest son, Marcus Nathan Adler (1837–1911), was involved in scholarly activities such as writing, editing, and translating. For instance, in 1907, his critical translation of and commentary on Benjamin of Tudela's medieval manuscript, The Itinerary of Benjamin of Tudela, was published (see below at "Sources").

Adler's middle son, Hermann Adler (1839–1911), was also a distinguished rabbi: he was head of a congregation in Bayswater during his father's lifetime, Adler's assistant from the time Adler's health began to deteriorate in 1879, and his successor as Chief Rabbi.

His youngest son, Elkan Nathan Adler (1861–1946), was an author, lawyer, historian, and collector of Jewish books and manuscripts. Adler was among the first to explore the Cairo Genizah, bringing over 25,000 manuscript fragments back to England.

== Works ==
He authored several responsa and produced various other works. His "monumental work" is the commentary Netinah LaGer on the Targum Onkelos, an Aramaic version of the Torah; he also wrote Ahavat Yonatan on Targum Jonathan. He published a German translation of part of Judah HaLevi’s philosophical work, the Kuzari.

Jewish titles
| Preceded by Solomon Hirschell | Chief Rabbi of the British Empire; 1845–1890 | Succeeded by Hermann Adler |
