= Benjamin Hirsch Auerbach =

German rabbi (1808-1872)

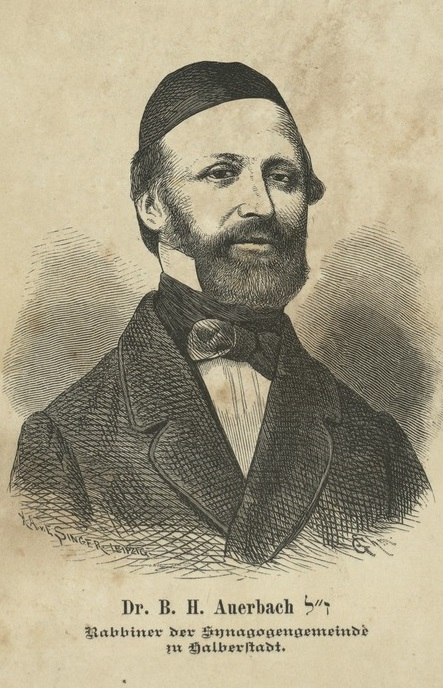
- Benjamin Hirsch Auerbach, 1865

Personal life
- Born: 1808 Neuwied, Duchy of Nassau
- Died: 30 September 1872 (aged 63–64) Halberstadt, Saxony, Prussia
- Parent: Abraham Auerbach (father)

Religious life
- Religion: Judaism

Benjamin Hirsch Auerbach (1808 – 30 September 1872) was a German rabbi and one of the most prominent leaders of modern Orthodox Judaism.

Benjamin received his first instruction from his father, subsequently studying at the yeshibot of Krefeld and Worms. Well equipped with Talmudic learning he entered the University of Marburg, where he studied from 1831 to 1834. Immediately afterward he was called to the rabbinate of Hanau, but declined, preferring the call to Darmstadt, as chief rabbi (Landesrabbiner) of the Grand Duchy of Hesse, for which office no less a personage than Zunz was his competitor. His position was, however, very difficult, as he was strictly Orthodox, while the majority of the congregation were Liberal. For the same reason he became the centre of discussion between Orthodox and Reformist members of the Jewish Community council in Rotterdam in 1848 where he was one of the applicants for the position of Chief Rabbi. Due to the turmoil he withdrew his application. He remained in Darmstadt for twenty-three years, but was forced to resign in 1857. He went to Frankfort-on-the-Main, where he busied himself with literary work until, in 1863, he was called as rabbi to Halberstadt, in which post he served until his death.

As a scholar and author, Auerbach ranks among the first in his party. He was among the first Orthodox rabbis who preached in pure German, and his textbook for religious instruction became popular. In the controversy aroused by the publication of Zecharias Frankel's "Darke ha-Mishnah," he naturally sided with Frankel's opponents, defending the view of the divine origin of the rabbinical law. It was Frankel who was one of the three rabbis asked by the Rotterdam Jews to judge the application of Auerbach for the position of Chief Rabbi.

Besides numerous sermons, he published: (1) "Lehrbuch der Israelitischen Religion," 1839, 3d ed., by his son Selig Auerbach, Giessen, 1893; (2) "Berit Abraham, oder die Beschneidungsfeier und die Dabei Stattfindenden Gebete und Gesänge. In's Deutsche Uebersetzt und mit einer Ausführlichen Literarhistorischen Einleitung Versehen," Frankfort-on-the-Main, 1869, 2d ed., 1880; (3) "Ha-Ẓofeh 'al Darke ha-Mishnah," a criticism of Frankel's "Introduction to the Mishnah," Frankfort-on-the-Main, 1861; (4) "Mishnat R. Nathan," notes on the Mishnah, written by Nathan Adler of Frankfort, who had been Abraham Auerbach's teacher, Frankfort-on-the-Main, 1862; (5) "Sefer ha-Eshkol", an edition of the ritual code of Abraham of Narbonne, Halberstadt, 1863 (see section below); and (6) "Geschichte der Israelitischen Gemeinde Halberstadt," Halberstadt, 1866.

== Family ==
His father, Abraham Auerbach, a descendant of an old rabbinical family which traced its origin back to Menahem Auerbach, one of the exiles of Vienna, was on the maternal side a nephew of Joseph David Sinzheim, the first president of the French Sanhedrin, and after having held various rabbinical positions became rabbi of the consistory of Bonn.

== The Nahal Eshkol Controversy ==
Auerbach published an edition of the "Sefer HaEshkol" in 1863 together with his commentary on it; the "Nahal Eshkol". He published three volumes of the work in his lifetime and claimed to be in possession of a fourth volume that he did not complete before his death.

In 1909 the scholar Shalom Albeck raised doubts as to the authenticity of Auerbach's manuscript and declared it a forgery.

Following Albeck's challenge, four prominent German rabbis (David Zvi Hoffmann, Abraham Berliner, Jacob Schor and Hanokh Ehrentreu) wrote a booklet published in Berlin in 1910 containing a defense of Auerbach named Tzidkat HaTzaddik – (literally "the righteousness of the saint"). Albeck did not leave this response unanswered and published a further booklet named Kofer HaEshkol – (literally "the denial of the Eshkol") (Warsaw, 1911), in which he explained his reasons for declaring the work a forgery.

A further defense of Auerbach was written as late as 1974 by Bernard Bergman in an essay in the Joshua Finkel Festschrift (New York, 1974).

Neither Auerbach or his heirs ever produced the original manuscript from which he worked to transcribe his "Eshkol" and no reasonable explanations have ever been given for the discrepancies in the work.
