= Hirschel Levin =

European rabbi (1721–1800)

Rabbi Hirschel Ben Arye Löb Levin
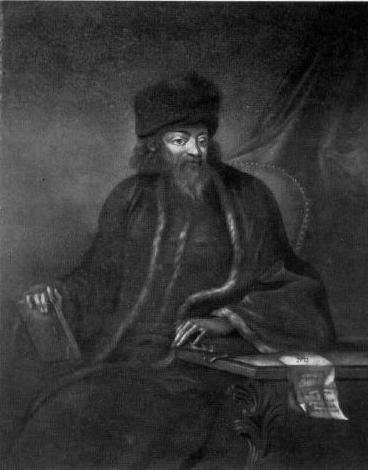
- Rabbi Hart Lyon
- Title: Chief Rabbi

Personal life
- Born: 1721 Rzeszów, Polish–Lithuanian Commonwealth
- Died: 26 August 1800 (aged 78–79)
- Children: Solomon Hirschell, Saul Berlin
- Parent(s): Aryeh Löb and Miriam Lowenstam
- Known for: Chief Rabbi of Great Britain and Berlin
- Occupation: Rabbi

Religious life
- Religion: Judaism

Senior posting
- Post: Chief Rabbi of Great Britain (1758–1764); Chief Rabbi of Berlin (1772–1800)
- Predecessor: Aaron Hart (Great Britain)
- Successor: David Tevele Schiff Meshullam Solomon (Great Britain)

Rabbi Hirschel Ben Arye Löb Levin (also known as Hart Lyon and Hirshel Löbel; 1721 – 26 August 1800) was Chief Rabbi of Great Britain and of Berlin, and Rabbi of Halberstadt and Mannheim, known as a scholarly Talmudist.

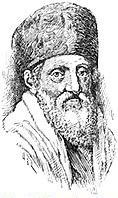
From the Jewish Encyclopedia

== Life ==
He was born in Rzeszów, Polish–Lithuanian Commonwealth to Aryeh Löb and Miriam Lowenstam. His father was rabbi at Amsterdam and his mother was daughter of Rabbi Chacham Zvi Ashkenazi. He was a descendant of Elijah Ba'al Shem of Chelm.

His glosses on the Talmud appear in the Vilna edition under the name of Rabbi Tsvi Hersh Berlin. His son, Rabbi Solomon Hirschell was also Chief Rabbi of the British German and Polish Jewish community, and the first of the British empire. His other son, Saul Berlin, was a Talmudist and notorious forger of the Besamim Rosh.

Jewish titles
Preceded by Aaron Hart	Chief Rabbi of Great Britain; 1758–1764	Succeeded by David Tevele Schiff; Meshullam Solomon
