= Hyman Klein =

Talmudic Scholar

Hyman Klein (1908–1958) was an English scholar of the Babylonian Talmud and translator of rabbinic literature. Klein's major contributions to the study of the Talmud were a series of articles that distinguished between the terse, attributed statements ("Gemara") of the Talmud, and the anonymous ("Sebara") stratum, the latter of which he considered to be Savoraic.

== Biography ==
Klein was born in London and attended the Etz Chaim Yeshivah and University of Cambridge. He also served as head of the Liverpool Talmudical College. He died in Jerusalem.

== Works ==
Klein's articles made major contributions to the methodology of separating the attributed, terse traditions ("Gemara") and the unattributed traditions ("Sebara"). Klein believed that Rav Ashi was responsible for the editing of Gemara, but that Sebara stemmed from the Savoraim. Along with the work of Julius Kaplan and Avraham Weiss, Klein's methodology influenced later scholars, such as Shamma Friedman and David Weiss Halivni.

"Gemara and Sebara," JQR 38 (1947), 67–91

“Gemara Quotations in Sebara,”JQR 43 (1953), 341–63;

“Some Methods of Sebara,” JQR 50 (1959), 124–46;

“Some General Results of the Separation of Gemara from Sebara in the Babylonian Talmud,” Journal of Semitic Studies 3 (1958), 363–72.

Klein also translated tractate Nazir for the Soncino Press.
