= Jakobovits =

Jakobovits is a surname. Notable people with the surname include:

- Amélie Jakobovits (1928–2010), British charity patron, wife of Immanuel
- Immanuel Jakobovits, Baron Jakobovits (1921–1999), Chief Rabbi of the United Kingdom
- Tobias Jakobovits (1887–1944); rabbi, historian and Czech librarian
