= Eli Cashdan =

Rabbi Eli Cashdan MA

Personal life
- Born: Eli "Yiddle" Cashdan; 1 June 1905 Starye Dorogi, Minsk, Belarus
- Died: 14 November 1998 (aged 93) Hendon, London
- Spouse: Minnie Cohen
- Education: Liverpool Yeshiva, Liverpool, London University

Religious life
- Religion: Judaism
- Denomination: Orthodox

Jewish leader
- Position: senior lecturer
- Organisation: Jews' College

Eli Cashdan (Hebrew: יהודה (בר יוסף דב) כשד"ן; Yiddish: יודל כשדן or Yiddle; 1 June 1905 – 14 November 1998) was a rabbi in the UK. He was a chaplain in the Royal Air Force during World War II, a senior lecturer at Jews' College and wrote a number of important books of Jewish interest.

== Biography and early education ==
Cashdan was born in Starye Dorogi, Minsk, (then Russia and now) Belarus, the fifth child of Joseph and Bessie Cashdan. He came to Liverpool, UK in 1905, when 3 months old, with his mother and four siblings. His father, Rabbi Joseph Cashdan, had come to the UK at an earlier date and worked in Liverpool as a rabbi and shohet.

He attended school at one of the first Jewish day schools in the UK (run by Dr S. Fox) where Jewish studies occupied half the day; he matriculated at age 15. He then went on to study at Liverpool Yeshiva (Liverpool Talmudical College; Yeshiva Torat Chaim) where he gained semikha from Rabbi Mordechai Yaacov Krasner at the very young age of 17. Cashdan studied law at London University and also attended Jews' College where in 1927 he obtained a First Class Honours degree in Semitics. He continued his law studies and was called to the Bar at Lincoln's Inn in 1933. Cashdan also received an M.A. degree in Semitics from London University.

In December 1930 Cashdan married Minnie Cohen whom he had met at the Rosh Pinah Youth Group he had set up. She was the elder daughter of Hyman Cohen (a businessman) and his wife, Clara, and they had two children, Basil and Evelyn. For some years the Cashdans lived in Hove, Sussex, after his appointment in 1956 to Jews' College he moved back to London and lived until his death in Hendon. Cashdan was a bibliophile and had an extensive collection of books of Jewish interest.

== Military career and Rabbinical and academic positions ==
In 1941 Cashdan joined the Royal Air Force and he served as senior Jewish chaplain in Middle East until he was discharged in 1946 with the rank of wing commander. He took up an educational post as headmaster of the local Hebrew classes in Hove, Sussex until 1950 when he was appointed senior lecturer at Jews' College. Teaching Semitics and other Jewish academic subjects in Jews' College until his retirement in 1975, a generation of British Rabbis passed through his hands, including Chief Rabbis, Lord Jakobovits and Lord Sacks. Cashdan was a regular and popular teacher at the summer and winter schools of Jewish Youth Study Groups. Cashdan never served as a communal rabbi and although he had semikhah he did not use the title rabbi until later on in his life.

== Publications ==
Cashdan was one of a group of Anglo-Jewish scholars who worked for the Soncino Press and he contributed to the Soncino Books of the Bible series and the Soncino Press Babylonian Talmud. Cashdan wrote the introduction and commentary for the last three of the Minor Prophets: Haggai, Zechariah and Malachi. He translated and annotated Tractates Hullin and Menahot and, from the Minor Tractates (Hebrew: מסכתות קטנות, romanized: Masekhtot Ketanoth), Avoth DeRabbi Nathan.

Cashdan wrote a new translation for the centenary edition of the Singer's Prayer Book the so-called "Cashdan Siddur", published in 1990.

In 1997 Cashdan published a new translation for the Psalms. Chief Rabbi Lord Jonathan Sacks wrote in the foreword to the translation, "Simple, direct, lucid and intelligible....it will allow these masterpieces of religious poetry to speak with their ageless power to a new generation".
