= Etz Chaim Yeshiva (London) =

Coordinates: 51°35′04″N 0°12′17″W

Etz Chaim

Location
- 83/85 Bridge Lane; London, NW11 0EE; England

Information
- Affiliation: Orthodox Judaism, Modern Orthodox

Etz Chaim Yeshiva was a "Lithuanian" Orthodox yeshiva, now advanced kollel, in Golders Green, London, England. It operated as a yeshiva from the early 1900s through the 1990s, when it repositioned to function as the latter. It has several prominent alumni including Commonwealth Chief Rabbis Immanuel Jakobovits and Jonathan Sacks.

== History ==
The yeshiva was founded in about 1900 in London's East End, where it occupied a campus on Thrawl Street; Rabbi Aharon Hyman was one of the founders. Rabbi Joseph Green was the first Rosh Yeshiva, and Rabbi Moshe Yitzchak Segal, later Rosh Yeshiva in Manchester, served as mashgiach ruchani. During World War I, Rabbi Abraham Isaac Kook was associated with the Yeshiva during his stay in London.

Rabbi Nachman Shlomo Greenspan succeeded Green as rosh yeshiva from 1918 to 1961. Rabbi Elyah Lopian was mashgiach ruchani from 1926 - 1950. Rabbi Leib Gurwicz, the latter's son in law and future Rosh Yeshiva at Gateshead, taught in the Yeshiva in the 1940s. Rabbi Hirsch Neumann taught in the yeshiva in the 1920s

Greenspan was succeeded by Rabbi Noson Ordman (1906-1996). Born in Tavrik, Lithuania, Rabbi Ordman was a 14 year alumnus of Telz Yeshiva; he came to London in 1936, and headed Etz Chaim for more than 50 years. From 1976 through the early 1980's Rabbi Aharon Pfeuffer led the Yeshiva alongside Rabbi Ordman.

In the 1960s the yeshiva had experienced a decline, with students drawn to Israeli and American yeshivas. Under Pfeuffer the Yeshiva saw a re-invigoration, attracting British talmidim studying at Israeli Yeshivas, particularly Mir and Hebron. It thus continued its operation with several dozen students.

In the 1990s, Rabbi Zvi Rabi became Rosh Yeshiva. During this time, Etz Chaim relocated to Bridge Lane, Golders Green, when it was repositioned so as to function as a specialized bet midrash comprising several advanced kollels and chaburahs — focusing separately on Choshen Mishpat, Yoreh Deah, Seder Tohorot, and in depth Amud Yomi. Its regular minyan (congregation) is today associated with the Union of Orthodox Hebrew Congregations. Rabbi Rabi headed the institution until his passing in 2020.

== Notable alumni ==
- Commonwealth Chief Rabbi Immanuel Jakobovits
- Commonwealth Chief Rabbi Jonathan Sacks
- Dayan Pinchas Toledano, Chief Rabbi of the Netherlands and Amsterdam Av Beit Din
- Rabbi Louis Isaac Rabinowitz, Chief Rabbi of South Africa
- Rabbi Sinaj Adler, Chief Rabbi of Ashdod
- Dayan Shemuel Bibas, Bet Din for Monetary Cases Jerusalem, and author of halachik works
- Dayan Ivan Binstock, London Beth Din
- Rabbi Kopul Rosen, Principal Rabbi of the Federation of Synagogues
- Rabbi Stanley Abramovitch, American Jewish Joint Distribution Committee
- Rabbi Harry Freedman, translator of several volumes of the "Soncino Talmud" and "Soncino Midrash Rabbah".
- Tzvi Yaron, Religious Zionist philosopher
- Dr Shlomo Adler, GP

== See also ==
- London School of Jewish Studies
