= Nachman Shlomo Greenspan =

Talmudic scholar and rabbi

Rabbi Nachman Shlomo Greenspan (Hebrew: נחמן שלמה גרינשפן; 1878 – August 1961) was a Talmudic scholar, rosh yeshiva of Etz Chaim in London, and an author of a number of Torah works.

== Biography ==
Greenspan was born in the village of Lyakhovichi in the Minsk Governorate of the Russian Empire (present-day Belarus), where his father Yaakov Moshe was engaged in commerce.

Upon the outbreak of World War I, Rabbi Greenspan fled to Britain via Belgium with his children. His wife Beila returned to Warsaw to look after the family's restaurant business. Initially he was Rosh Yeshiva in Liverpool and later moved to Leeds to take up the position of Rosh Yeshiva there. He finally moved to the East End of London, where he assumed leadership of the Etz Chaim yeshiva. Rabbi Greenspan remained at Etz Chaim for the rest of his life, where he produced many hundreds of learned students and pupils alongside distinguished colleagues such as Rabbis Elya Lopian, Leib Gurwicz and Noson Ordman. Among his more well-known students were future Chief Rabbi Lord Jakobovits, Dayan Pinchas Toledano, Judge Leonard Gerber and Arnold J. Cohen.

Greenspan died at the age of eighty-three. He left many Halachic and Talmudic writings, and a large number of his written manuscripts were destroyed in the First World War.

== Works ==
- Kodshei HaGevul (London, 1930)
- Pilpulah shel Torah (London, 1935)
- Meleches Machsheves (London, 1955)
- Meleches Machsheves - (Jerusalem, 2017)

== Sources of information ==
=== References ===
- Obituary in Haneemon, Rabbinic journal (page 28, Hebrew)
- Short biography in the book "An Introduction to Jewish Civil Law", by Arnold J. Cohen, a pupil of Rabbi Greenspan
