= Julius Kaplan (Talmud scholar) =

Talmudic Scholar

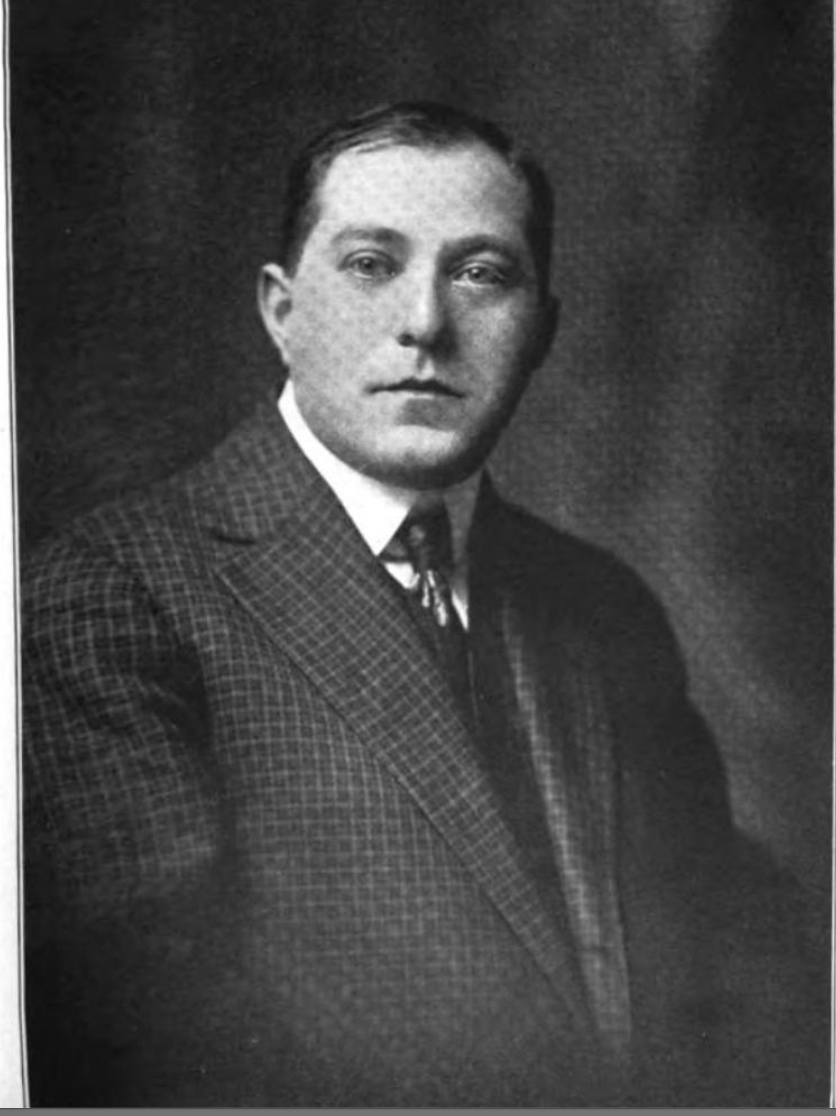
Julius Kaplan at the Jewish Theological Seminary (c. 1915)

Julius Kaplan (יחיאל קפלן) (1939—1885), was a professor of Talmud at Yeshiva College and a scholar of the Babylonian Talmud, who made major contributions to the scientific understanding of the development of the Talmudic text. Kaplan was the first to systematically argue that Ravina and Rav Ashi were not the redactors of the Talmud, but rather the Savoraim.

== Biography ==
Julius Kaplan was born in Koidanov near Minsk, then part of the Russian Empire on May 7, 1885. After studying at the local yeshiva, he went to Vilna and studied with Rabbi Chaim Ozer Grodzinski, then Chief Rabbi of Vilna. In 1906, Kaplan moved to New York and continued his studies at the Rabbi Isaac Elchanan Theological Seminary. Israel Efros was a one time classmate of his. Kaplan received his undergraduate (1914) and masters degree (1915) from Columbia University. In 1915, Kaplan received his rabbinic ordination from the Jewish Theological Seminary, where he also learned critical approaches to rabbinic literature from Louis Ginzberg. After briefly serving in rabbinical positions in Glen Cove, NY and Bradford, PA, in 1917, Kaplan became an instructor of Talmud at the Mizrachi Teachers Institute, which was eventually merged into Yeshiva College by Rabbi Meir Bar-Ilan. Kaplan returned to Columbia University for his PhD and, in 1932, he completed his dissertation, "The Redaction of the Babylonian Talmud," under the supervision of Richard Gottheil. At the time of his passing in 1939, Kaplan served as Professor of Rabbinics at the Graduate School of Yeshiva College and chairman of the faculty of the Teacher's Institute.

== Work ==
Kaplan's book, "The Redaction of the Babylonian Talmud," a reworking of his dissertation, was published in 1933. In the book, Kaplan argued that Ravina and Rav Ashi were not the redactors of the Babylonian Talmud, but created "Gemara," that is, set traditions, and the later Savoraim redacted the Talmud. While it has been known since the time of Rabbi Sherira Gaon that the Savoraim played some role in editing the Talmud and medieval commentators on occasion mention post-talmudic editing, Kaplan was the first to argue that the Talmud as a whole post-dated Rav Ashi. While originally rejected by scholars such as Boaz Cohen (or considered only one possibility by Gedaliah Alon), Kaplan's thesis of the post-Amoraic redaction of the Babylonian Talmud has been further argued in the work of Hyman Klein, Abraham Weiss, Shamma Friedman, and David Weiss Halivni.
