= Naftali Schiff =

English rabbi

- Rabbi Naftali Schiff
- Occupations: Founder and Chief Executive Jewish Futures
- Known for: A serial “social entrepreneur”, Naftali Schiff is universally recognised as founding, directing and developing numerous educational organisations and initiatives
- Title: Chief Executive Jewish Futures

Naftali Schiff is the Founder and Chief Executive of Jewish Futures, also known as Jewish Futures Trust, a not-for-profit international organisation, which creates, incubates and scales dynamic educational organisations and initiatives.

== Early life and education ==
Schiff was raised in London and attended Hasmonean High School. He went on to study at Yeshivat HaKotel in Jerusalem. He holds a B.Sc (Econ) specializing in International Relations from the London School of Economics, and received rabbinic ordination from the Jerusalem Rabbinate as well as a Diploma of Education.

== Professional life ==
In 1993, Schiff became Director of the Jerusalem Fellowships, running educational programs, which has taken thousands of Jews across the globe, including trips to Israel, Australia, America and South America.

In 1996, Schiff founded the Danny Frei Jerusalem Fellowships, a four-week summer program in Israel for Jewish youth from the United Kingdom.

In 1999, Schiff returned to London to head a Aish UK. Under his leadership, Aish UK grew from a staff of ten to tens of full-time educators. Aish UK's objective is to inspire young Jews to develop a deeper connection to Judaism and to ensure a vibrant future for the Jewish people. Through diverse educational opportunities, immersive experiences and creating enduring relationships, it shares the wisdom and beauty of Jewish faith, practice and community – connecting with thousands of young Jews, whatever their background, from school age through leaving home for university life, until they build their own home. Since its founding, the rate of intermarriage in the United Kingdom has reportedly decreased. In 2013. 20% of Jewish marriages in the UK involved Aish alumni, and in 2018 26% of Jewish marriages reported in the UK were Aish Alumni.

In 2004 Rabbi Schiff founded GIFT (Give It Forward Today). GIFT's objective is to create a generation of givers and encourage the culture of giving between people and communal organisations. As well as regular educational workshops and programs in schools, youth movements and communal organisations GIFT provides volunteering opportunities for young people.[9] [10]

Schiff has subsequently created and helped to develop the following organisations and projects under the guidance of the Jewish Futures family:

- Chazon – Klal UK, an educational organisation offering learning programs that uplift, reinforce and strengthen the Jewish connection of teachers, students and families from the Orthodox Jewish community
- J*Link, a group bringing educational programs into mainstream, non-Jewish schools
- Forum for Jewish Leadership (FJL), an organisation dedicated to identifying, inspiring and training a new generation of intellectually curious young Jews, providing them with the skills and confidence to effective, committed leaders of Jewish communities across the globe. Since FJL's inception, hundred of students from the United States, United Kingdom, Australia and Eastern Europe have attended FJL's leadership programs.
- Legacy Live, A film and book production organisation. Legacy Live has produced documentaries including a film about Lady Amélie Jakobovits wife of former Chief Rabbi Lord Immanuel Jakobovits, Baron Jakobovits. Legacy Live produces bespoke films and books on commission.
- Shelanu (Hebrew: שלנו) – an organisation set up to enable Israeli expats living in the UK to connect to their Jewish-Israeli culture.
- Ta'amim (‘Taste’ in Hebrew) – educates Jews of all backgrounds and ages in their unique culinary history, traditions and memories, providing a lifetime’s worth of ways to engage every day in their Jewish identity.
- JRoots – Founded by Schiff in 2006, JRoots educated thousands of young people every year about the Holocaust and Jewish heritage, through inspiring, meaningful and educational journeys across Poland, Eastern Europe, Israel and Morocco.
- Time4Torah – created with the help of his son Ro'i, educating thousands of students across the globe with daily textual online study, with lessons given by Ro'i.
- Eilecha is Jewish Futures newest member organisation, created in 2022 to help inspire connection and involvement through spiritual and musical engagement.

Jewish Futures: In 2015, Schiff founded Jewish Futures, a platform created to unite diverse educational organisations and initiatives, to ensure Jewish futures and Jewish continuity under the guidance of Rav Yitzchak Berkovitz. Rabbi Schiff is Chief Executive of Jewish Futures and uses his 25 years of expertise gained whilst actively working with communal engagement initiatives to nurture and expand its twelve member organisations that sit within the Jewish Futures group. Each of the twelve organisations provide a different means to connecting Jews with Judaism. “JFT is essentially a meta-institution formed as a means to empower, synergize, and support an entire family of initiatives who share the goal of ensuring a vibrant Jewish future.”

Jewish Futures has grown internationally with branches of several of their member organisations opening in Israel.

== Holocaust Education ==
Schiff has been actively involved in Holocaust education for many years In 2006 he founded JRoots, a non-profit educational organisation that offers trips for Jewish youth to destinations of Jewish interest worldwide. JRoots has specialized in passing on the legacy of Holocaust survivors and educating young Jewish people about their heritage and Jewish identity.

Schiff has travelled the world interviewing Holocaust survivors to record their stories. This project was filmed as a documentary series by JRoots multimedia division Legacy Live, The “Vehigadeta Levinchaseries – And you shall tell it to your children”. This first film in the series has been distributed worldwide.

The second film in this series tells the story of Holocaust survivor Eva Neumann, who was featured alongside Rabbi Schiff on Channel 5 News in October 2006.

Schiff aided in publishing the bespoke JRoots Guide to Poland: Triumph and Tragedy. Other films in this series include documentaries about Holocaust survivors Leah Kaufman, Pearl Benisch (student of Sarah Schenirer) and Dov Landau.

In 2018 Rabbi Schiff met Holocaust Survivor Josef Lewkowicz and convinced him to speak for the first time since the Holocaust about his survival story. What started as a short meeting in Josef's daughter's house in America has now developed into a published book by Penguin Random House, "The Survivor" released in March 2023.
