= Adolf Büchler =

Hungarian rabbi, theologian and historian

Adolf Büchler (also Adolph; 18 October 1867 in Priekopa, Austria-Hungary (now Slovakia) – 20 February 1939, London) was an Austro-Hungarian rabbi, historian and Jewish theologian.

== Biography ==
In 1887, he began his theological studies at the Rabbinical Seminary of Budapest, and at the same time studied in the Department of Philosophy of the university under Ignác Goldziher and Moritz Kármán. Büchler continued his studies at the Breslau Seminary and in 1890 graduated with a PhD from Leipzig University, his dissertation being Zur Entstehung der Hebräischen Accente, which was later published in the Sitzungsberichte der Wiener Akademie der Wissenschaften of 1891.

Büchler returned to Budapest to finish his theological studies and graduated as a rabbi in 1892. He then went to Oxford for one year, where he worked under the direction of his uncle, Adolf Neubauer and published an essay, "The Reading of the Law and Prophets in a Triennial Cycle". The same year he accepted a position as instructor at the Vienna Jewish Theological Seminary, teaching Jewish history, the Bible and the Talmud. Büchler became Principal of Jews' College in London in 1906.

== Selected works ==
- Die Priester und der Cultus im Letzten Jahrzehnt des Tempelbestandes, Vienna, 1895
- Die Tobiaden und die Oniaden, Vienna 1899
- Das Grosse Synedrion in Jerusalem und das Beth-Din in der Quaderkammer des Jerusalemischen Tempels, Vienna 1902.

He also contributed some essays to the Jewish Quarterly Review, the Monatsschrift, the Revue des Études Juives, and other periodicals, mainly on the last days of the Second Temple.

== Sources ==
- Adolph Büchler memorial volume (OUP, 1956)
