= Congregation Shomrei Emunah (Baltimore) =

Orthodox Jewish synagogue in Baltimore, Maryland, US

- Hebrew: קהילת שומרי אמונה
- Location in Baltimore

Religion
- Affiliation: Orthodox Judaism
- Rite: Ashkenazic
- Ecclesiastical or organisational status: Synagogue
- Leadership: Rabbi Binyamin Marwick
- Status: Active

Location
- Location: 6221 Greenspring Avenue, Baltimore, Maryland 21209
- Country: United States
- Coordinates: 39°22′8″N 76°40′49″W

Architecture
- Established: 1971 (as a congregation)
- Completed: 2007

Website
- shomreiemunah.org

Congregation Shomrei Emunah (Hebrew: קהילת שומרי אמונה) is an Orthodox Jewish synagogue in the Greenspring neighborhood of Baltimore, Maryland. Rabbi Binyamin Marwick is the synagogue's rabbi.

== History ==
The synagogue was founded in 1971 by Lithuanian-born Rabbi Benjamin Bak, who led the congregation from 1972 until 1989. Bak was succeeded by Rabbi Tzvi Hersh Weinreb, who served as spiritual leader for 13 years before becoming head of the Orthodox Union in 2002. Under Weinreb's administration, membership increased from 140 to 450 families.

Rabbi Dovid Gottlieb, who received his rabbinic ordination from Rabbi Isaac Elchanan Theological Seminary, served as spiritual leader until making aliyah in 2009. He was succeeded by Rabbi Binyamin Marwick, a musmach of Yeshivas Ner Yisroel, rabbi since 2009. The Shul has grown under his leadership to over 700 families.

== Membership ==
The synagogue's large and active membership encompasses a broad spectrum of American Orthodox Jewry, including Hasidic, non-Hasidic, Modern Orthodox, centrist, and Haredi. The congregation is openly supportive of its host country and was one of the first synagogues in the United States to add a prayer for the US armed services to its Shabbat morning prayers following 9/11. Like other Orthodox congregations in the city, synagogue members engage in charitable activities for non-Jewish as well as Jewish causes.

The congregation has paired with the Israeli settlement of Eli as its sister city.

== Activities ==
The synagogue schedules many shiurim (Torah lectures) and adult education opportunities, including guest lecturers, regular shiurim in Daf Yomi, Amud Yomi, Chumash, Navi, and Halakha. The youth program includes all ages from two to post high school. The synagogue has weekly Shabbat youth groups and a popular teen minyan with a weekly kiddush.

The Congregation is a center for many major city events, including Rabbi Frand's annual teshuva drasha, musical concerts and important lectures. In January 2014 the Diaspora Yeshiva Band staged one of its first three reunion concerts at Shomrei Emunah; band founder and lead singer Avraham Rosenblum is a synagogue member.

== See also ==
- History of the Jews in Maryland

== Bibliography ==
- Guttenberg, Shaye, ed. (2002). כרחם אב על בנים: קונטרס על פרקי אבות [As A Father Has Compassion On His Children: Pamphlet on Pirkei Avot] (in Hebrew). Congregation Shomrei Emunah.
