= Elie Munk =

German-born French rabbi (1900–1981)

- Born: 1900; Germany
- Died: 1981 (aged 80–81)
- Occupations: rabbi and rabbinic scholar
- Spouse: Fanny Frumet Goldberger
- Children: Amélie Munk
- Relatives: Immanuel Jakobovits, Baron Jakobovits (son-in-law)

Elie Munk (1900–1981), was a German-born French rabbi and rabbinic scholar, "a scion of a long and distinguished line of German rabbis and scholars".

A number of other Jewish scholars have similar names. Eliyahu Munk translated numerous Jewish Bible commentaries to English. Eli Munk wrote the book Seven Days of the Beginning. All are members of the same extended family.

== Career ==
From 1926 to 1936, he was district rabbi of Ansbach, Bavaria, Germany.

In 1936, he moved with his family to Paris, where he was rabbi of the Communauté Israélite de la Stricte Observance.

After the Nazi invasion of France, they moved to Switzerland in 1940, and remained there until the Liberation of Paris.

== Selected publications ==
- Die Welt der Gebete (2 volumes, 1938). In English, The World of Prayer (2 volumes, 1954–63)
- Das Licht der Ewigkeit (1935)
- La justice sociale en Israel (1947)
- Rachel (on the duties of Jewish women, 1951)
- a translation into French of Rashi's Pentateuch commentary (1957)

== Personal life ==
He married Fanny Frumet Goldberger (1906–1979). Their children included Amélie Munk, who married Immanuel Jakobovits, who became the UK's Chief Rabbi, and Miriam Munk, who married Rabbi Abba Bronspiegel.
