= Davka =

Jewish software company

Davka Corporation
- Company type: Private
- Industry: Software
- Founded: 1982
- Headquarters: Chicago, Illinois, United States
- Products: Judaic games, encyclopediae, word processors, etc.
- Website: http://www.davka.com/

Davka Corporation is a software company specializing in applications related to Jewish history, customs and traditions and the Hebrew language. Founded in 1982, Davka is notable as the publisher of several early games for the Apple II computers including The Lion's Share (1983 video game) by Robert Aaron and The Philistine Ploy by Robert Aaron and Alan Rosenbaum. The company has published numerous software titles for the PC, Macintosh and Palm platforms including the ubiquitous Davkawriter Hebrew/English Word processor.

== Name ==
The name Davka comes from a Hebrew word that is difficult to translate. At times the intent is to say "exactly so"; often, the word "specifically" can be used as a synonym, but it has many other translations.

== About ==
In the late 1990s and somewhat beyond, its major competitor was Jerusalem-based Torah Educational Software.

== Davkawriter ==
DavkaWriter is a Hebrew-English word processing program for Windows. (A Mac version is available as well.)

Its built-in tools include a dictionary, a thesaurus, and a translating tool. It comes with the complete Hebrew texts of the Bible and many other volumes of Jewish literature. Its spellchecker recognizes both English and Hebrew words.

DavkaWriter Platinum was reviewed in 2002, 2004 and 2006 issues of The Jewish Press, referring to updated versions.

=== CD-ROM - Soncino Classics Collection ===
Davka also released a CD-ROM named Soncino Classics Collection that contains:

- Hebrew and English of Tanach
- Aramaic and English of the Soncino Talmud
- Soncino Midrash Rabbah
- Soncino Zohar

In addition to The New York Times' 9 paragraph 1998 review, a full page was devoted in The Jewish Press to this CD in 2003.

== See also ==
- Torah Educational Software
- Jewish Nonviolent video games
