= Authorised Daily Prayer Book =

The Standard Prayer Book, Enlarged American Edition, 1915

The Authorised Daily Prayer Book (formally The Authorised Daily Prayer Book of the United Hebrew Congregations of the British Empire, commonly known as Singer's Prayer Book or Singer's Siddur) was an English translation of the Hebrew siddur created by Rabbi Simeon Singer. First published in 1890, it has gone through many editions, and is still used in many British Orthodox synagogues and homes.

Singer's goal was "to unite accuracy and even literalness with due regard to English idiom, and to the simplicity of style and diction which befits the language of prayer". The siddur became popular not only due to the quality of its translation, and its relatively compact size, but also because the Montefiore family paid for its production, allowing it to be sold for one shilling. The Hebrew text was that of Seligman Baer's classic Avodat Yisrael, to which Singer provided an "authorised" version of the liturgy capable of standardising and stabilising the synagogue service and helping to create an "established" Judaism in the United Kingdom and the Commonwealth, particularly for the United Synagogue (the so-called "Minhag Anglia".) In 1915 the Bloch Publishing Company published an American version, The Standard Prayer Book, which was widely used until the introduction of Philip Birnbaum's Ha-Siddur Ha-Shalem in 1949.

The siddur was expanded in 1917 under Chief Rabbi Joseph Hertz; 1934 saw a "continuous" version, minimizing the need for cross-reference, and which also incorporated additional material. The 1962 Second Edition, under Chief Rabbi Israel Brodie, was completely re-typeset; also the translation was amended where it had become unclear or archaic, and further additional material had been introduced. The Centenary Edition of 1990 saw an extensively revised translation by Rabbi Eli Cashdan, and also included a series of explanatory notes by Chief Rabbi Lord Jakobovits. In 2006, Chief Rabbi Jonathan Sacks penned a new translation, with commentary, instructions, laws & rubrics; this Fourth Edition was designed by Raphaël Freeman and formed the basis for the Koren Sacks Siddur published 2009.

The latest edition of the Authorised Daily Prayer Book - a.k.a. the New Singer's Siddur was published in June 2023, by the current Chief Rabbi Sir Ephraim Yitzchak Mirvis KBE. This new siddur includes additional essays and an introduction by the Chief Rabbi on how to learn responsibility through prayer. Dayan Ivan Binstock of the London Beth Din has produced a guide to the Jewish year and prayer (mirroring such in the Koren) incorporating the customs of the United Synagogue. Going month by month, Dayan Binstock clearly sets the rhythms and practices of daily prayer with helpful charts.
