= Harry Freedman (rabbi) =

British rabbi

Rabbi Harry Mordecai Freedman

Rabbi in England, Australia, and the United States

Teacher at Yeshiva University

Personal life
- Born: October 17, 1901 Vitebsk, Russia
- Died: December 4, 1982 (aged 81)
- Notable work(s): Translations of the Talmud, Midrash Rabbah, and Encyclopedia Talmudit
- Education: University of London, Etz Chaim Yeshiva, Jews College
- Occupation: Rabbi, author, translator, teacher

Religious life
- Religion: Judaism
- Denomination: Orthodox

Harry Mordecai Freedman (17 October 1901 – 4 December 1982) was a rabbi, author, translator, and teacher. Among his more famous contributions are his translations done for several tractates of the Talmud, Midrash Rabbah, and Encyclopedia Talmudit.

== Biography ==
Freedman was born in Vitebsk, Russia in 1901. His family moved to England and he grew up in London. He studied at the Etz Chaim Yeshiva, received a BA from the University of London, semicha from Jews College, and a PHD from the university of London (in 1923, 1924, and 1930 respectively). He served in pulpit positions in England, Australia, and the United States, and served as a teacher at Yeshiva University.

== Family ==
Freedman was father in law to prominent Melbourne lawyer, Arnold Bloch.

== Published works ==
=== Translations ===
Freedman made several significant contributions as a translator.

- Eight volumes of the Babylonian Talmud as part of the Soncino English edition of the Talmud.
- Midrash Rabbah (10 volumes), with Maurice Simon.
- Several volumes of Menachem Mendel Kasher's Torah Sheleimah, called The Encyclopedia of Biblical Interpretation in English.
- Encyclopedia Talmudica, the English edition of Encyclopedia Talmudit.
- Israel Passover Haggadah, an English Translation of Kasher's הגדה ארצישראלית

=== Books ===
- One Hundred Years: The Story of the Melbourne Hebrew Congregation 1841-1941 (1941)
- He wrote the commentary for the biblical books of Genesis, Joshua and Jeremiah for the Soncino Books of the Bible
- A commentary on the Pentateuch, published posthumously in 2001.
