= Moshe Jakobovits =

Moshe Jakobovits משה יעקובוביץ
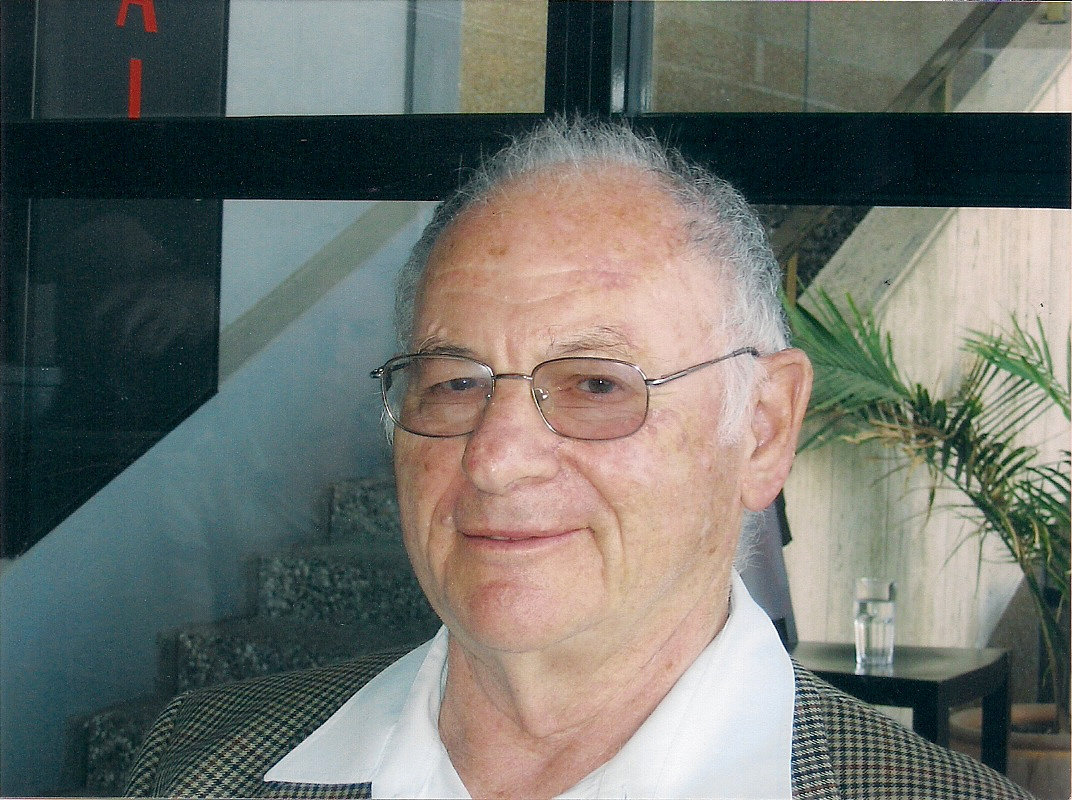

Personal life
- Born: Moshe (Manfred) Jakobovits; 15 March 1926 Prague, Czechoslovakia
- Died: 29 December 2018 (aged 92) Haifa Israel
- Spouse: Sarah Jakobovits (née:Schwarz)
- Children: Naomi Nachshon (née Jakobovits), Tamir Jakobovits
- Parent(s): Rabbi Tobias Jakobovits; Bertha Jakobovits (née Petuchowski)
- Occupation: civil service

Religious life
- Religion: Judaism

Moshe Jakobovits (Hebrew: משה יעקובוביץ; 15 March 1926 – 29 December 2018) was commander of Masu'ot Yitzhak, a kibbutz in Gush Etzion (the Etzion Bloc) destroyed in the 1947–1949 Palestine war (known in Israel as Israel War of Independence), the last commander of the Gush Etzion settlements during the Israel War of Independence, Chief Customs officer of Haifa between the years 1977–1987, and Consul for Economy and Trade (Customs) in Europe between 1987 and 1990.

Jakobovits was one of two sons of Rabbi Tobias Jakobovits, Czech historian and librarian, and was the cousin of Rabbi Immanuel Jakobovits, Baron Jakobovits, Chief Rabbi of the United Hebrew Congregations of the British Commonwealth. Jakobovits added Jakobi to his family name (Moshe Jakobi-Jakobovits) prior to his diplomatic mission for the State of Israel.

== Childhood ==
Moshe Jakobovits was born in 1926 in Prague, capital of Czechoslovakia, son of Bertha (née Petuchowski, of Berlin) and Rabbi Tobias Jakobovits – librarian of the Jewish community of Prague and scholar of Jewish texts. Born to a religious family, Moshe was educated at the Jewish school in his native city. The school was located in the same building in which the family resided, at Jáchymova Street, No. 3, today housing the offices of the Jewish Museum of Prague. In March 1939, days before the entry of the Wehrmacht into Prague, Moshe Jakobovits marked his Bar Mitzvah by ascending to the Torah in the Altneuschul Synagogue in Prague. The venue of the event did not appear on the invitations for the security of invitees. Following his Bar Mitzvah, Moshe joined the Bnei Akiva youth movement.

== Aliyah (immigration) ==
On 21 October 1939, Moshe Jakobovits was sent to Mandatory Palestine under the auspices of the Youth Aliyah, and lived in Tel Aviv with his uncle, Michael Jakobovits. Following his Aliyah, he studied and lived at Yeshiva "Ha'Yishuv Ha'Chadash" of Rabbi Amiel in Tel Aviv, and, subsequently, at Yeshivat "Kol Torah" in Jerusalem. During the 1941/42 academic year, following a conversation with Henrietta Szold, Moshe Jakobovits moved to the Moshav Kfar Haroeh where he joined a group of children preparing for studies at an agricultural school of the Youth Aliyah. In the 1943/44 academic year, the group began its studies at the Mikveh Israel Agricultural School. During his studies at Mikveh Israel, Moshe Jakobovits joined the Haganah and underwent basic training.

== Before the War of Independence ==
=== Joining the "Masu'ot" Group ===
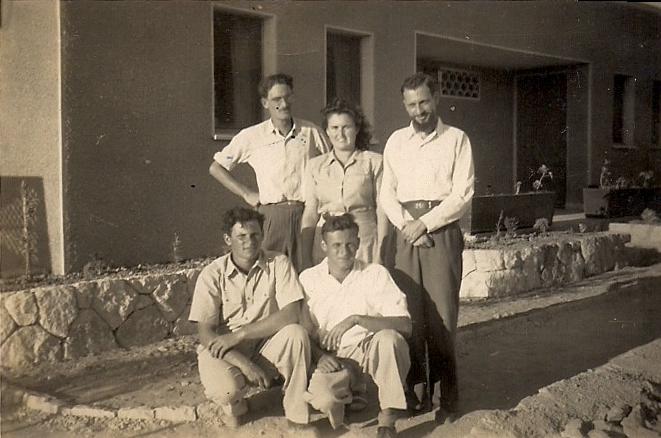
Kibbutz Masu'ot Yitzhak, 1947. Kneeling front left: Moshe Jakobovits, his brother Yoseph. Standing rear right: Immanuel Jakobovits.

At the end of 1943/44 academic year, Jakobovits finished high school at Mikveh Israel and, with other graduates of the school, formed the "Czech Gar'in" ["Gar'in" refers to a "nucleus" or formative group] which began its training at Kibbutz Tirat Zvi in 1943. During his training at Tirat Zvi, he volunteered to be a "Noter" in the Jewish Settlement Police set up by the British, serving as a Noter in the Gilboa Brigade at Tirat Zvi station, and, in parallel, continued to be active in the Haganah. During this period he met his spouse to-be, Sarah Schwarz.

In November 1944, he and fellow members of his Gar'in, then already called the "Masu'ot Group", established a temporary kibbutz settlement within the bounds of Kfar Haroeh, with the objective of establishing a permanent settlement on Mount Hebron, next to Kibbutz Kfar Etzion. In April 1945, the Gar'in moved to Gat Rimon, next to Petach Tikva. At the beginning of November 1945, the Gar'in established a settlement on the land of Hubela, to the west of Kfar Etzion, and decided to name the new kibbutz "Masu'ot Yitzhak," after the Chief Rabbi of Israel, Rabbi Yitzhak HaLevy Herzog, then still living.

=== Commander of Masu'ot Yitzhak ===
Moshe Jakobovits continued to serve as a Noter at Masu'ot Yitzhak as well. He was sent to a Notrim course at the central school for Notrim at a youth village next to Afula, and, upon his return from the course, he was appointed commander of the Notrim station at Masu'ot Yitzhak. In parallel, he continued his activity with the Haganah, as was customary in that period. In this context he participated in the squad leader training course of the Haganah, Jerusalem District, conducted at Gush Etzion (the "Etzion Bloc") in the summer of 1946. That same year, he was called upon to serve as regional director of Masu'ot Yitzhak – this, too, in the context of the Haganah. A dispute erupted between the people of the young kibbutz and the Arabs of the area over a portion of the lands of the settlement, especially concerning a plot that was called the "600 dunam". In the summer of 1947, the Arabs attacked a group of kibbutz members engaged in agricultural work in the disputed area, and a squad of Notrim was summoned from Masu'ot Yitzhak under the command of Moshe Jakobovits. On the heels of a riot that erupted, the British police were summoned and separated the belligerents. An investigation was launched against Moshe Jakobovits for use of arms, and he was suspended from his post as commander of the Notrim station until the investigation was completed. During the period of his suspension (summer to fall, 1947), the Haganah Jerusalem Zone Command sent him to a course for platoon commanders, at that time, effectively an officers' training course.

=== Platoon Commander Course ===
The platoon commander course in which Jakobovits participated (Course 19) was the last such course directed by the Haganah. The course, under the command of Mundak Pasternak (Moshe Bar-Tiqvah), was initially conducted at the kibbutzim Sarid and Ginegar in the Jezreel Valley, with the participants under the cover of naturalists. The platoon of Moshe Jakobovits – Platoon 1, under the command of Danny Mass – trained unarmed at Kibbutz Sarid, while Platoon 2, under Natanel Hitron, and Platoon 3 under Uzi Narkis, trained at Kibbutz Ginegar and included training with a medium machine gun in a hidden cave. A British patrol detected the site of machine gun training and it was consequently decide to move the entire course to Juara. At the end of the course, in November 1947, Moshe Jakobovits stood for oral examination by Haim Laskov and Yigael Yadin, and participated in the graduation review in the presence of Haganah Commander-in-chief Yaakov Dori. Beside Moshe Jakobovits, other graduates of Platoon Commander Course 19 included personalities who held key positions in the War of Independence, and thereafter, as major generals and brigadier generals. Among them were Yekutiel Adam, Avraham Adan ("Bren"), Uri ben Ari, Mordechai ben Porat, Rehavam Ze'evi ("Gandhi"), Avraham Tamir (Avrasha), Israel Tal (Talik), Yaakov Salman, Elad Peled, Moshe Rusnak, Nachum Shoshani, Aharon (Jimmy) Shemi, and many others.

== During the Course of the Battles ==
=== Command of Masu'ot Yitzhak ===
After completion of the course, Jakobovits returned to Masu'ot Yitzhak. A few days thereafter, on 29 November 1947, the United Nations decided upon the partition of Palestine. The Etzion Bloc was included in the intended Arab state. The day after the partition declaration (the onset of the War of Independence), Jakobovits was summoned to the headquarters of the Jerusalem Sector of the Haganah for assignment of a command role. Among the various roles he was offered, Jakobovits elected to return to his role as regional commander in Masu'ot Yitzhak. During the first weeks, he was responsible for securing convoys from Jerusalem to the Etzion Bloc. On the night of 15–16 January 1948, Jakobovits stood at the head of his men, at the western emplacements of Masu'ot Yitzhak, awaiting the arrival of the Mountain Brigade (the Brigade of the Lamed-Heh = Convoy of 35) that had been dispatched to reinforce and resupply Gush Etzion. With dawn, Jakobovits discerned heavy traffic of military vehicles and ambulances in the region of the village of Jeva. Only later would the connection with the bitter fate of the Brigade of the Lamed-Heh become clear.

=== Commander of the Western Sector ===
On 21 March 1948, Moshe (Mosh) Zilberschmidt assumed command of Gush Etzion. In early May, he redesigned the defenses of the four settlements of the Bloc, and divided the Bloc into three defensive sectors. Moshe Jakobovits was named commander of the western sector, in addition to his position as regional commander of Masu'ot Yitzhak. Under his command was a company composed of defenders of Masu'ot Yitzhak and Revadim, responsible for the defense of the two settlements and the adjacent command posts: "the Fifth Point," "Giv'at Olga," "the 600 Dunam," and "Giv'at Hasla'im" ["Boulder Hill"] that connected Masu'ot Yitzhak to Kfar Etzion. In the Arab attack on Gush Etzion on 4 May 1948, Jakobovits sent forces of the brigade under his command to capture the first three command posts.

=== Rescue of the Hospital and Its People ===
On the 12 May 1948, a massive Arab attack began on the redoubts of Gush Etzion. To maintain constant communication between Masu'ot Yitzhak and Kfar Etzion – even in the face of Arab penetration of the first line of defense – Moshe Jakobovits sent a squad from Masu'ot Yitzhak to capture Giv'at Hasla'im. This force managed to deflect charges of the Arab Legion and thus prevent an attack on Kfar Etzion from this direction. Under the cover of darkness, Jakobovits managed to reach Kfar Etzion to coordinate with Ya'akov Altman (named commander of the Bloc after Mosh fell at the Battle of the Russian Monastery) and to convince him to move the hospital, and all of its medical personnel and injured to Masu'ot Yitzhak. Evacuation of the hospital was conducted during the course of the night by the men of Masu'ot Yitzhak who carried the injured on their backs and secured the path via Giv'at Sela'im. The hospital was lodged in natural caves in Masu'ot Yitzhak that had been cleaned and prepared in advance for possible shelter. Thus, Jakobovits saved the lives of about sixty injured and medical staff, among them Weisenberg, director of the hospital, and the chief medic, Rivka Nedivi (Prague, born 1926) who volunteered to remain in Gush Etzion and treat the injured while her infant was evacuated to Jerusalem, along with the other mothers and children.

=== The "Queen" Has Fallen ===
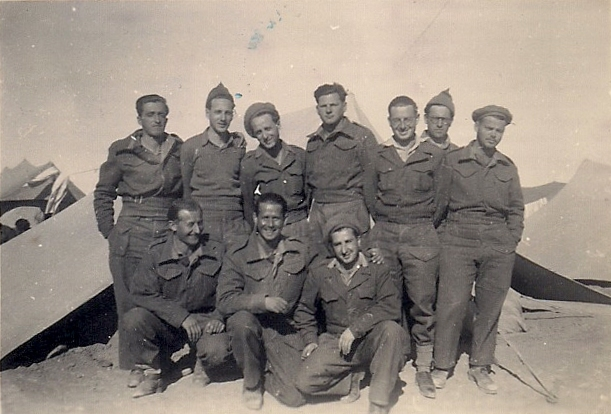
POW group in Jordan, 1949. Moshe Jakobovits is second row, middle.

The next morning, several armored vehicles of the Legion succeeded in penetrating into Kfar Etzion, and its defenders decided to surrender. After the surrender, a massacre was perpetrated on the men of Kfar Etzion, among them Ya׳akov Altman. Nachum ben-Sira, member of Masu'ot Yitzhak, succeeded in escaping the massacre and reached the kibbutz. Moshe Jakobovitz assumed command of the Bloc, the forces under his command were arrayed for the defence of Masu'ot Yitzhak, Revadim and Ein Tzurim. Later in the day, he telegraphed Haganah HQ in Jerusalem, by means of a heliograph: "Queen has fallen, we are left without ammunition and will not be able to hold. Requesting assistance." ('Queen' was the code name for Kfar Etzion.)

== As POW in Jordan ==
It was concluded that the Etzion Bloc would surrender and that its fighters would be taken prisoner. Due to the concern that Arab villagers would breach the kibbutzim and slaughter their inhabitants, Moshe Jakobovits decided that surrender would be orderly and would be coordinated with officers of the Legion, thus ensuring the safety of the surviving residents. On the afternoon of Friday, 14 May 1948 – at the time Ben Gurion declared the establishment of the State of Israel in Tel Aviv – two Legion officers arrived at Masu'ot Yitzhak and began coordination with Moshe Jakobovits, with the assistance of the medic Uriel Ofek, who knew Arabic. They promised to preserve the safety of the people of the settlements, and, in accordance with their promise, soldiers of the Legion took up positions around the settlement and drove away Arab villagers with gunfire. The Legion officers also acceded to Jakobovits's request and allowed him to remove a Torah scroll and Holy Books, previously hidden in the ground, and to remove them along with the population of Masu'ot Yitzhak.

After about two weeks' confinement at the Hebron police station, the prisoners of war were transferred to a prison camp at Umm el-Jammal. The prisoners were released in stages, in several groups, ending in March 1949, and were transferred to Israel via the Mandelbaum Gate. Moshe Jakobovits was the last to leave the POW camp.

== At the Treasury (Israel Tax Authority – Customs) ==
About two months after his release from custody, he was married and the couple moved to Haifa. There, Jakobovits began to work at Customs. In 1977, he was appointed Chief Customs Officer (גובה המכס) for the Haifa and Northern District. At the time of the First Lebanon War, he served as responsible for the negotiating the transport of goods from Lebanon. To that end, he met in Haifa with his Lebanese counterpart from Beirut. In the summer of 1987, Moshe Jakobovits was sent to Milan, Italy, where he served as Consul for Economy and Trade (Customs) in Europe until his return to Israel in the summer of 1990. Moshe Jakobovits was survived by a son and daughter, five grandchildren and four great grandchildren.
