= FJL =

FJL can refer to:

- Fly Jinnah, a low-cost airline based in Pakistan, by ICAO code
- Federico Jiménez Losantos, a Spanish radio presenter and rightist pundit
- Rangomaramidae, a family of flies, by Catalogue of Life identifier
- Forum for Jewish Life, an organization which English rabbi Naftali Schiff had been involved in

== See also ==
- Frans Johan Louwrens Ghijsels (1882–1947) or F. J. L. Ghijsels, a Dutch architect
