= Sidney Brichto =

British rabbi

Rabbi Sidney Brichto
- Rabbi Dr Sidney Brichto

Personal life
- Born: Sidney Brichto; 21 August 1936 Philadelphia, Pennsylvania, United States
- Died: 16 January 2009 (aged 72) London, England
- Spouse: Cathryn Brichto
- Children: 4
- Education: Hebrew Union College – New York

Religious life
- Religion: Judaism
- Denomination: Liberal Judaism
- Position: Rabbi

Sidney Brichto (21 July 1936 – 16 January 2009) was an America-born British Liberal rabbi. In 1964 he became the first executive director of (as it was then) the Union of Liberal and Progressive Synagogues, now known as Liberal Judaism. In 1982, he established the Israel Diaspora Trust.

In 1987, he published widely-discussed proposals to arrive at a historical compromise between progressive and Orthodox streams of Judaism.

== Early life ==
He was born in Philadelphia into an immigrant Orthodox Jewish family. As an adolescent, he began to reject religious orthodoxy in favor of Liberal Judaism. He studied in New York City at the Hebrew Union College – New York, before being ordained in 1961.

== Career ==
In 1961 he moved to England to do post-graduate work at University College London and also became Associate Minister of the Liberal Jewish Synagogue in St John's Wood.

Brichto was also a prolific author, having written extensively in the Jewish and national press. One of his last projects, called The People's Bible, was the publishing of a series of new translations of the Bible, both the Old and New Testaments. Brichto believed that the concept of God is more important than questions of His existence. Equally, the Bible is relevant not because of the veracity of its stories, but because of the morality of its myths. His translations aimed to achieve accessibility as literature, and to do this, he controversially added sections to improve readability and removed large areas of non-consequential material to the appendices.

== Views ==
=== Compromise between Orthodox and Progressive streams ===
In 1987, he published widely-discussed proposals for a historic compromise between progressive streams of Judaism and Orthodox Judaism. He advocated for the Orthodox Beit Din to oversee contentious areas. In return, progressive rabbis would earn respect from the Orthodox rabbinate, a degree of recognition and a role in Beit Din processes concerning progressive Jewry. Brichto's proposals encouraged rabbi John Levi to support such an initiative in Melbourne.

Among Brichto's proposals, progressive streams of Judaism would stop processing their own conversions to Judaism. Instead, their prospective converts would have their status conferred on them by an Orthodox Beit Din. The Beit Din would be expected to show more leniency than usual, but only expecting that those before them demonstrate knowledge of Orthodox practice rather than observance.

The proposal was rejected by Immanuel Jakobovits, Baron Jakobovits, then Chief Rabbi of the United Hebrew Congregations of the Commonwealth. Jakobovits reasoned: "How can an Orthodox Beth Din validate a conversion without kabbalat mitzvot [acceptance of the commandments]?"

However, in 1990, the Chief Rabbi-elect, Jonathan Sacks was more favourable to the proposal. In a letter to Brichto, he wrote: "As soon as I read your article... I called it publicly ‘the most courageous statement by a non-Orthodox Jew this century'. I felt it was a genuine way forward. Others turned out not to share my view." He continued: "It will be a while - 18 months - before I take up office. But I believe we can still explore that way forward together. For if we do not move forward, I fear greatly for our community and for Am Yisrael."

=== Israel and Zionism ===
Brichto was a strong supporter of Israel and Zionism. In 1982, he established the Israel-Diaspora Trust, a forum of influential Jewry in British public life. It was established in response to a decline in public support for Israel amid the 1982 Lebanon War.

In 2001, he distanced himself from colleagues in the progressive rabbinate that agreed to participate in a memorial event alongside Palestinian leaders, commemorating Palestinian suffering during the creation of the State of Israel. Brichto explained that the occasion would “give a propaganda coup to the Palestinian authorities by diverting attention from the fact that they began an unprovoked intifada” months earlier and “after rejecting peace proposals.”, in reference to Yasser Arafat's rejection of a Two-state solution in 2000.

In a 2005 letter published by The Guardian, Brichto wrote that "Jews around the world will continue supporting Israel, not only because it is our spiritual home, but because Israel is seeking peace with the Palestinians, and peace is key among Jewish values."

== Personal life ==
He was married to Cathryn and had a daughter and three sons.

A fellowship was established in his name at the Oxford Centre for Hebrew and Jewish Studies at Oxford University.

== Bibliography ==
His published works included:

- The New Testament (A new translation and modern explanation, ISBN 0-9553833-1-5)
- Genesis (the book of Genesis, ISBN 0-9537398-0-5)
- The Conquest of Canaan (the books of Judges and Joshua, ISBN 0-9537398-4-8)
- Samuel (the two Books of Samuel, ISBN 0-9537398-1-3)
- Song of Songs (the books The Song of Songs, Ruth, Lamentations, Ecclesiastes and Esther, ISBN 0-9537398-2-1)
- St. Luke & The Apostles (the Gospel of Luke and Acts of the Apostles, ISBN 0-9537398-3-X)
- The Genius of Paul (the letters of Paul, ISBN 0-9537398-5-6)
- Moses (divided into Book 1: Moses, Man of Godand Book 2: The Laws of Moses) (the books of Exodus, Leviticus, Numbers and Deuteronomy, ISBN 0-9540476-8-0)
- Apocalypse (Gospel of John and Book of Revelation, ISBN 0-9540476-9-9)

Brichto also wrote a guide to Jews and Jewish life, Funny ... you don't look Jewish (ISBN 1-899044-00-0) in which he explored, among other things, anti-Jewish prejudices against the reality of Jewish culture and life.

His autobiography, Ritual Slaughter: Growing Up Jewish in America (ISBN 0-9540476-1-3), provided detailed information of Brichto's upbringing and move away from Orthodoxy.
