= Josef Lewkowicz =

Polish-born writer and Nazi hunter (1926–2024)

Josef Lewkowicz (15 March 1926 – 26 December 2024) was a Polish-born Holocaust survivor and Nazi hunter.

== Holocaust ==
Lewkowicz was born in a shtetl in southeast Poland in 1926. At the age of 13, he witnessed the Nazi occupation of Poland. By the time he was 16, he had been separated from his mother and siblings, whom he never saw again. Together with his father, Symcha, Lewkowicz was requisitioned for forced labor and entered the concentration camp system in 1942. His father later died at Auschwitz.

Lewkowicz was sent to the Kraków-Płaszów concentration camp operated by the SS in Płaszów, a southern suburb of Kraków, in the General Governorate of German-occupied Poland. The camp was then under the command of Amon Göth, later known as the "Butcher of Płaszów", whose brutality was depicted in the film Schindler's List. Lewkowicz later recounted that Goeth would kill people for looking him in the eye or for walking too slowly. Lewkowicz would ultimately spend time in six different concentration camps, including Auschwitz and Mauthausen. He was the sole survivor of his family during the Holocaust.

== Post-war ==
After the conclusion of World War II, Lewkowicz became a Nazi hunter and worked with the U.S. military to track down Nazi SS leaders among German POWs in American camps. After a few months, he encountered Göth, wearing an ill-fitting soldier's uniform. In 2023, Lewkowicz recounted to Canadian Broadcasting Company (CBC) host Susan Ormiston, "I recognized him right away ... I saw that murderer's face, I knew it very, very well." In addition to Göth, Lewkowicz identified five other high-ranking Nazi officials. All six were hanged following the Nuremberg trials.

Lewkowicz is also credited with rescuing 600 Jewish children who were hidden in monasteries and orphanages throughout Poland to survive the war and helping to relocate them to Israel. His son had encouraged him to reconnect with them, but Lewkowicz chose not to, stating, "I want to forget it. It was such a horrible job."

Lewkowicz later worked as a diamond dealer in South America, then married and raised his family in Montreal, Canada, before moving to Jerusalem.

Lewkowicz refrained from speaking about his Holocaust experiences for much of his life. He had the Auschwitz tattoo on his arm removed by a plastic surgeon in South America, a decision he later expressed regret over. He began speaking publicly about his Holocaust experiences following the urging of his children and the encouragement of Rabbi Naftali Schiff, who has focused on preserving final witness testimonies. This collaboration led to the creation of the book The Survivor and the 2019 documentary The Survivor’s Revenge, which details his postwar experiences. Lewkowicz reflected on the challenge of conveying the human story amidst the overwhelming facts of genocide, stating in his book, "I’m conscious that giving too many examples of depravity may dilute their impact." In later years, he was involved with JRoots, a charity that organizes educational Jewish trips to Poland. He died on 26 December 2024, at the age of 98.

== Media ==
Lewkowicz's life was chronicled in The Survivor, released in the UK in March 2023. It has since been translated into 12 languages and is set to be released in the United States by Harper Horizon on 27 January 2025, International Holocaust Remembrance Day.

The 2019 documentary The Survivor’s Revenge, based on Lewkowicz's life, documents his pursuit of justice of Nazi war criminals, including Amon Göth.
