= Tobias Jakobovits =

Czech rabbi, historian and librarian

Rabbi Tobias Jakobovits
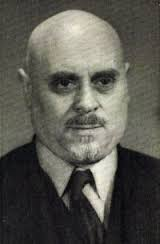
- Jakobovits in 1942

Personal life
- Born: Tobias Jakobovits; 23 November 1887 Lackenbach, Austria-Hungary
- Died: 29 October 1944 (aged 56) Auschwitz concentration camp
- Spouse: Bertha Jakobovits (née Petuchowski)
- Children: Joseph Jakobovits, Moshe (Manfred) Jakobovits
- Parent(s): Rabbi Solomon Jakobovits; Amalia Jakobovits (née Schwartz)
- Education: PhD Charles University in Prague
- Occupation: Scientist, librarian

Religious life
- Religion: Judaism
- Denomination: Orthodox

Tobias Jakobovits (Hebrew: ד"ר טוביאס (טוביה) יעקובוביץ; 23 November 1887 – 29 October 1944) was a Rabbi, historian and Czech librarian, historian of Czech Jewry, and an expert in ancient Hebrew manuscripts. He was the chief librarian of the Prague Jewish community in the inter-war period, and the professional manager of the Jewish Museum in Prague during the Nazi Occupation. He was deported to the Auschwitz concentration camp in the fall of 1944 and was murdered there along with his wife.

His nephew (the son of his oldest brother – Joel Julius Jakobovits), Lord Dr. Israel Immanuel Jakobovits (1921–1999) became the Chief Rabbi of the United Hebrew Congregations of the Commonwealth between 1967 and 1991.

== Biography ==
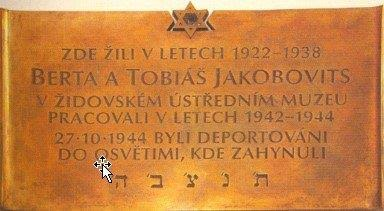
A memorial plaque to Tobias Jakobovits and his wife Bertha, displayed by the Jewish Museum in Prague

Tobias Jakobovits was born on 23 November 1887 in Lakompak, in what was then western Hungary and today is known as Lackenbach in Austria. He was one of the children of the Rabbi Shlomo (Solomon) Jakobovits and his wife Amalia (née Schwartz). Tobias was privileged to receive both a religious and secular education simultaneously in accordance with the cultural state of central Europe at that time. He studied first in the Bratislava Yeshiva (then part of Austria-Hungary, today the capital of Slovakia) and completed his rabbinical studies at the Berlin Seminar.

In 1912 he settled in Prague and was employed as the assistant to the head librarian of the Jewish community. In 1917 he served as the chief rabbi of the Michle Quarter that was then known as Quarter 4 in the city. Concurrently, he continued his studies. He studied Semitic philology at the Charles University (German University) in Prague (named after Archduke Karl Ferdinand of Austria) and completed his doctoral thesis about the subject "The Messianic Concept in the Talmud" in 1920.

The year 1922 was a watershed year in the life of Tobias Jakobovits for a few reasons. He was granted Czechoslovak citizenship, was promoted to the position of head librarian of the Jewish community in Prague and also got married. He married Bertha Petuchowski, the daughter of the Rabbi Petuchowski, who was the instructor of Tobias at the Berlin Seminar. In 1924 their firstborn son, Yoseph Jakobovits was born. Two years later their second son, Moshe (Manfred) Jakobovits, was born. At the same time, Tobias was active in the Council of Rabbis of Bohemia and also worked as an instructor for religious studies at German Jewish schools.

In the year 1928 he discontinued his position as the rabbi in Prague but for the next two years he fulfilled the position of rabbi, cantor and religious school teacher in the small town of Uhlířské Janovice, in proximity to Prague. During this period, he published many research articles about the genealogy and history of Czech Jews. Under his leadership, the library engaged in collecting rare holy books and manuscripts dealing with subjects pertaining to Judaism and the history of Czech Jews. He was the first to manually catalogue all the books and manuscripts that were found in the library. In this endeavor of extensive revising his comprehensive knowledge of the general history of the Jews and his mastery of additional foreign languages and literature is quite apparent.

During the second half of the 1930s the shadow of the approaching war began to affect the family of Tobias Jakobovits. In the middle of 1939, Jakobovits sent his firstborn son, Joseph, to the Land of Israel (Mandatory Palestine) and then a few months later also sent his younger son, Moshe. He fulfilled his position as the head librarian of the Jewish community until 1939. After the conquest and occupation of the city by the Nazis in March 1939 the library was closed, but Jakobovits continued to be employed by the Jewish community as the archiver and researcher. Despite the fact that he was offered a position as an historian in the United States, Jakobovits preferred to stay in Prague and contribute his knowledge in the occupied city.

In 1942 Jakobovits was added to the team of the Jewish Museum in Prague under the Nazi occupation as an expert in history and ancient manuscripts. He became the professional manager of the museum, and despite the fact that Joseph Polak created the concept of the museum, the official responsibility for the running of the museum was predicated on Jakobovits. The Nazis planned on turning the museum into "The Central Museum for the Exterminated Jewish Race" and to present it before the Aryan race. To execute this purpose, they concentrated in the museum a variety of many Jewish treasures that were plundered by them from all around Nazi-occupied Europe. Jakobovits and his colleagues engaged in sorting out hundreds of thousands of Jewish items – holy items, books, handwritten documents and manuscripts –- that arrived from all over Europe. Jakobovits was the curator of the first exhibition that took place under Nazi occupation in the Great Synagogue of Prague in October 1942. The exhibition was based upon the project which he himself instituted in 1927 and included rare Jewish and Hebrew books and manuscripts. It is important to mention that Hans Günther, the head of the "Central Office for Jewish Emigration" (German: Zentralstelle für judische Auswanderung), who was the supervisor of the activity of the museum, refused to include in the exhibition articles that were presented before the war that reflected the sedate life and cooperation between the Jews and the German nation.

In the years 1942 to 1944 Jakobovits participated in a discussion regarding the renovation of the Old New Synagogue (Czech: Staronová synagoga; German: Altneu-Synagoge), also called the Altneuschul, situated in Josefov, Prague, which was Europe's oldest active synagogue and transforming it to be part of the museum. He demanded that anything that was connected to the synagogue had to be removed. In 1943, he participated in the writing of a guidebook to the central Jewish museum and in this work he described the history of the synagogues in which was located the Jewish museum. Jakobovits maintained an optimistic attitude regarding the fate of the Jews who were deported by the Nazis to camps in the east and expressed his hope that the purpose of the museum would be to preserve the Jewish items during the war and until these items would be returned to their rightful owners and the Jewish communities throughout Europe.

Tobias and Bertha Jakobovits were deported to Auschwitz on 27 October 1944 and were murdered there on 29 October 1944. Their sons moved to The Land of Israel (Mandatory Palestine) in the 1930s and their progeny are living today in Israel.

== His research and writings ==
As an historian, Jakobovits performed research about the Jews of Europe in general and, specifically, about the Jews in Czechoslovakia and Bohemia. His research was published in a number of books that were mostly published within the framework of The Yearbook of the Historical Society of Czech Jews and the magazine The Monthly Scientific History of the Jews.

=== Books ===
- Dějiny vzniku knihovny náboženské obce v Praze – 1927
- Entstehungsgeschichte der Bibliothek der israelitischen Kultusgemeinde in Prag – 1927
- Die Judenabzeichen in Böhmen – 1931
- Die Erlebnisse des Oberrabbiners Simon Spira-Wedeles in Prag, 1640–1679 – 1932
- Jüdisches gemeindeleben in kolin 1938

=== Articles ===
- Die Jüdischen Zünfte in Prag – 1936
- Das Prager und böhmische Landesrabbinat Ende des siebzehnten und Anfang des achtzehnten Jahrhunderts – 1933
- Die Brandkatastrophe in Nachod und die Austreibung der Juden aus Böhm.-Skalitz, 1663–1705 – 1938
- Der alte jüdische Friedhof in Prag: ein Führer durch den Friedhof und seine wichtigsten Denkwürdigkeiten aus dem XIV.-XIX published by the Jewish Museum 1960.
