= Isidore Epstein =

British rabbi (1894–1962)

Rabbi Ezekiel Isidore Epstein
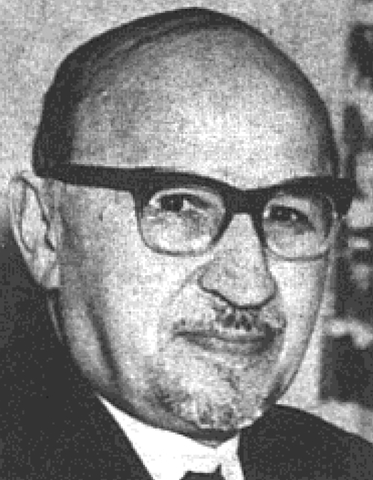
- Rabbi Isidore Epstein

Rabbi of Middlesbrough Hebrew Congregation
- In office 1920–1928

Principal of Jews' College, London
- In office 1945–1961

Personal life
- Born: May 7, 1894 Kovno, Lithuania
- Died: April 13, 1962 (aged 67)
- Notable work: Editor of the first complete English translation of the Babylonian Talmud
- Education: University of London
- Occupation: Rabbi, scholar, educator

Religious life
- Religion: Judaism
- Denomination: Orthodox

Ezekiel Isidore Epstein (Hebrew: יחזקאל יצחק אפשטיין; 1894–13 April 1962) was an English Orthodox rabbi, Jewish studies scholar, and Jewish educator. Epstein edited the first complete English translation of the Babylonian Talmud (the Soncino Talmud), served as the headmaster of Jews' College, London, and was the author of The Faith of Judaism, a work of 20th-century Jewish philosophy. He was also the author of numerous scholarly and popular books on Judaism.

== Biography ==
Epstein was born in Kovno, Lithuania, on 7 May 1893. His father was David Epstein, a bootmaker, and his mother was Malka Epstein. Both parents were Orthodox Jews. The family moved to Paris, France, when Epstein was very young, and, in 1903, moved again to London. There, he attended Old Castle Street School and Raine's Foundation School.

At the age of fifteen, he studied Talmud at Great Garden Street's beit midrash. Due to the quality of his work, he was sent to study at the Pressburg Yeshiva under Rabbi Akiva Sofer. (He had also studied in Paris under Rabbi Zadoc Kahn, Chief Rabbi of France.) He received semikhah (rabbininc ordination) from Rabbi Isaiah Silberstein of Vác, Rabbi Yisrael Chaim Daiches of Leeds, and Rabbi Abraham Isaac Kook while the latter was based in London during World War I.

He was advised by Chief Rabbi of the United Kingdom Joseph Hertz to obtain an academic education. He studied at the University of London, earning a First Class BA Honours degree in Semitic languages, followed by two doctorates: the PhD and the DLit.

He served as rabbi of Middlesbrough Hebrew Congregation from 1920 to 1928, and then joined the teaching staff of Jews' College, London. In 1945, he was appointed Director of Studies and, subsequently, Principal. He retired in 1961.

Epstein married twice: he married his first wife, Jeanie, in Belfast in 1921; the couple had two children, Helen and Jack. However, she died in 1924, and Epstein remarried 3 June 1925. With his second wife, Gertrude, Epstein had a third child on 13 April 1926: Samuel Stanley Epstein, who died on 13 March 2018. Isidore Epstein died on 13 April 1962.

== Works ==
Epstein is known for editing the first complete English translation of the Babylonian Talmud, which published by the Soncino Press between 1935 and 1952. He recruited many scholars for the project, personally reviewing all of the work as it was produced and coordinating notations and commentary on the text.

Epstein was also an editor of Joseph Hertz's Pentateuch and Haftorahs (1929–1936) and editor of a collection of papers (published 1935) in connection with the eighth centenary of the birth of Maimonides (b. 1135).

His publications include:

- The Responsa of Rabbi Simon B. Zemah Duran As a Source of the History of the Jews in North Africa (Oxford University Press, 1930)
- Ed., Moses Maimonides: Anglo-Jewish Papers in Connection with the Eighth Centenary of His Birth (London, 1935)
- Judaism (London, The Epworth Press, 1939)
- Social Legislation in the Talmud (Tnuath Torah Va'Avodah, 1943)
- Man and His Creator: A guide-book for teachers (Jewish Educational Publications) (London, Woburn House, 1944)
- Ed., Joseph Herman Hertz, 1872–1946, in Memoriam (London, Soncino Press, 1947)
- The Jewish Way of Life (Edward Goldston, 1947)
- The Faith of Judaism: an interpretation for our times (London, Soncino Press, 1954)
- Step By Step in the Jewish Religion (London, Soncino Press, 1958)
- Judaism: A Historical Presentation (Penguin, 1950s, many subsequent editions)
