= Hirsch Jakob Zimmels =

- Born: 29 December 1900; Jaworów, Austrian Galicia
- Died: 9 November 1974 (aged 73); London, United Kingdom

Hirsch Jakob Zimmels (29 December 1900 – 9 November 1974) was a rabbi and historian of Judaism.

He obtained a PhD from the University of Vienna in 1926, and was ordained there the following year. In 1939, he fled to London after the Nazi Anschluss. He was interned by the British government in a camp in Australia between 1940 and 1942, after which he returned to London, and was appointed a lecturer in Bible, Talmud and Jewish history at Jews' College, London. In 1961 he became director of studies at that institution, and was appointed principal in 1964, exercising that role until 1969. He wrote widely on Ashkenazi history and culture.
