= Aharon Pfeuffer =

Personal life
- Born: 1949
- Died: 1993 (aged 43–44) Kruger National Park, South Africa
- Occupation: Rabbi, Rosh yeshiva, Posek

Religious life
- Religion: Judaism

Jewish leader
- Yeshiva: Yeshiva Maharsha Beis Aharon; Etz Chaim Yeshiva, London; Yeshiva College of South Africa

Aharon Pfeuffer (Hebrew: אהרן פפויפר, also "Pfoifer"; 1949–1993) was a Rabbi, Rosh Yeshiva and Posek, and a recognized authority on Kashrut.

== Biography ==
Pfeuffer studied in various Yeshivot, primarily Hebron and HaNegev in Israel, as well as Lakewood in the US. He later studied in chavruta with Shmuel Rozovsky, famed Rosh Yeshiva (dean) of Ponevezh, and came to consider him his primary Rabbi. He received Semicha, Rabbinic ordination, from Tzvi Kushelevsky.

He was active in Israel, London, and then Johannesburg: He taught in yeshivot in Hadera and Kfar Haroeh; He co-headed the Etz Chaim Yeshiva (London) from 1976; He founded and headed the Yeshiva Maharsha Beis Aharon from 1982 (later named "Beis Aharon" for him), and lead the Yeshiva gedolah program at the Yeshiva College of South Africa in the early 1980s.

He died in a car accident on his way to the Kruger National Park.

== Works ==
Rabbi Pfeuffer is best known for his series on Kashrut, with volumes titled, e.g., "Kitzur Shulchan Aruch al Hilchos Basar be-Chalav" ("Summarized laws of Milk and Meat"). These explicate the Halacha (law) for the major Rabbinic topics here — with one on Niddah also — and are often recommended as a resource for students preparing for Semicha. These were later popularized in a graphical and tabular format published in both Hebrew and English.

Rabbi Pfeuffer produced several other scholarly works. These include "Zichron Menachem" and "Ohr Aharon" comprising, largely, "shiurim and chidushim" on various Talmudic tractates, the latter written during his years as Rosh Yeshiva.
