= Yeshiva Maharsha Beis Aharon =

Haredi Jewish community in Johannesburg

- Hebrew: ישיבת מהרש"א בית אהרן

Location
- Corner of Sandler Street and Elray Street, Fairmount, Johannesburg; South Africa; 26°09′04″S 28°05′58″E

Information
- Type: Yeshiva
- Religious affiliation: Haredi Judaism
- Established: 1982; 44 years ago
- Founder: Aharon Pfeuffer
- Gender: Male & Female
- Campus type: Urban, suburban
- Website: www.maharsha.co.za/home

Yeshiva Maharsha Beis Aharon (Hebrew: ישיבת מהרש"א בית אהרן, Yeshivat Maharsha Beis Aharon) is a Yeshiva and community based in Fairmount, Johannesburg. It was founded in 1982 by Rabbi Aharon Pfeuffer (for whom the Yeshiva was later named) and led by him until his death in 1993. It is now headed by Rabbi M. Raff. The Yeshiva comprises a Beit Midrash. It also operates a pre-primary, and primary and high schools for boys and girls. In 2014, the synagogue and school facilities were renovated.

== History ==
The yeshiva and community traces its origins to the Yeshiva College of South Africa initiatives of the mid-twentieth century. It was founded amid the Baal teshuva movement, which was gaining traction in Johannesburg's Jewish communities in the 1980s and 1990s.

In 1982, the community and yeshiva were founded by Rabbi Aharon Pfeuffer, of whom the yeshiva is now named after. Pfeuffer's initiative transformed into a subcommunity as a Haredi congregation-cum-learning-centre.

In 1993, Rabbi Pfeuffer was killed in a car accident on the way to Kruger National Park.

During the COVID-19 pandemic, Rabbi Raff of the Maharsha community established a COVID-safe “bubble” for students to study in Oranjeville in the Free State.

== See also ==
- Jewish education in South Africa
- Orthodox yeshivas in South Africa
