= Amud Yomi =

Amud Yomi (Hebrew: עמוד יומי) "column [of the] day" or "daily page") is a daily regimen undertaken to study the Babylonian Talmud one amud each day. (Compare with Daf Yomi in which a daf consists of two amud's, one on each side of the page).

== Initiation ==
The idea for calendar-based learning of the Talmud began with Daf Yomi in 1923. Many have, however, found it difficult to keep up with the "heavy load" of two pages (or one daf) each day. In addition, the pace is considered too fast to delve into the material. As such, Amud Yomi was created as a mechanism allowing for the review of all of Talmud, systematically while at a manageable pace.

== Process ==
With 2,711 dappim (plural for daf) in the Talmud, there are over 5400 amudim. (It is not exactly twice the number of dappim, as some tractates will end on the front side of the page.) Most programs schedule some days for review or catch up, typically on Saturday and/or Sunday. As such, programs will cover between five and seven amudim a week. Depending on the schedule, the entire Talmud would be completed in this fashion after 15 to 21 years. In some cases - such as at Etz Chaim Yeshiva (London) - this pace, relative to Daf Yomi, allows for the major mefarshim to be reviewed alongside the daf, and "shas" may then be completed with commentaries.

== See also ==
- List of masechtot, chapters, mishnahs and pages in the Talmud
- Other study cycles under Torah study § Study cycles
