= Priekopa =

Priekopa Kapás
- Municipality
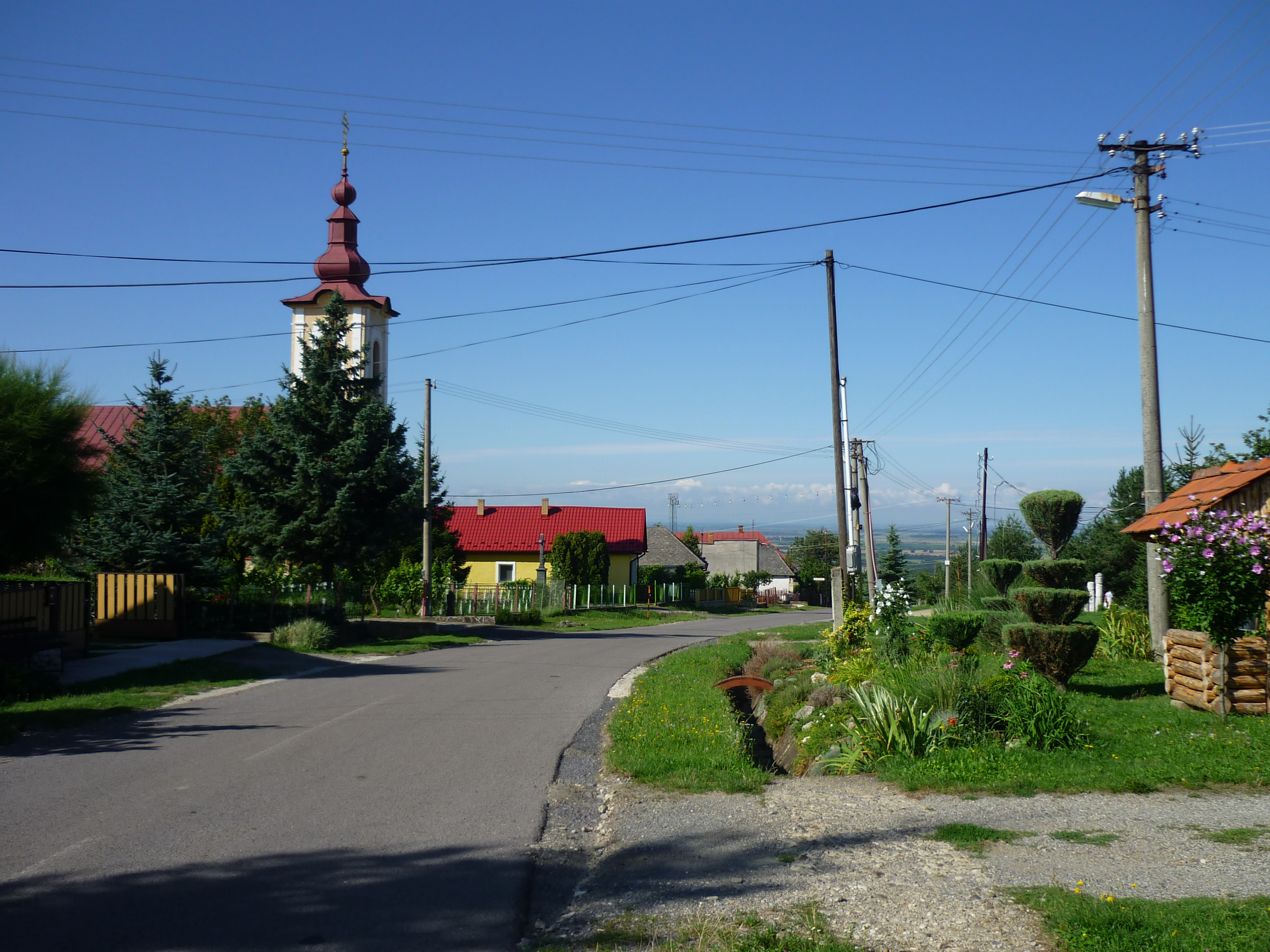

- Flag

- Location of Priekopa in the Košice Region Location of Priekopa in Slovakia
- Coordinates: 48.75°N 22.27°E
- Country: Slovakia
- Region: Košice Region
- District: Sobrance District
- First mentioned: 1418

Area
  - Total: 12.67 km^{2} (4.89 sq mi)
- Elevation: 280 m (920 ft)

Population (2025)
  - Total: 282
- Time zone: UTC+1 (CET)
  - Summer (DST): UTC+2 (CEST)
- Postal code: 726 1
- Area code: +421 56
- Vehicle registration plate (until 2022): SO
- Website: priekopa-obec.sk

Priekopa (Hungarian: Kapás) is a village and municipality in the Sobrance District in the Košice Region of east Slovakia. In historical records the village was first mentioned in 1418. The village lies at an altitude of 108 metres and covers an area of 12.269 km^{2}. It has a population of about 300 people. The village has a soccer pitch.

== Geography ==
The municipality lies at an altitude of 280 metres (920 ft) and covers an area of 12.67 km^{2} (4.89 sq mi) (2025).

== Population ==
Population statistic (10 years)
Year	1995	2005	2015	2025
Count	312	300	290	282
Difference		−3.84%	−3.33%	−2.75%

Population statistic
Year	2024	2025
Count	278	282
Difference		+1.43%

It has a population of 282 people (31 December 2025).

=== Ethnicity ===
Census 2021 (1+ %)
Ethnicity	Number	Fraction
Slovak	269	96.76%
Not found out	8	2.87%
Total	278	

In year 2021 was 278 people by ethnicity 269 as Slovak, 8 as Not found out, 2 as Rusyn, 2 as Other and 1 as Czech.

Note on population: The difference values of population numbers in the table "Population statistic" and in the sections "Ethnicity" & "Religion" is caused by the use of various statistical methods.

=== Religion ===
Census 2021 (1+ %)
Religion	Number	Fraction
Greek Catholic Church	148	53.24%
Roman Catholic Church	95	34.17%
None	14	5.04%
Eastern Orthodox Church	12	4.32%
Not found out	8	2.88%
Total	278	

In year 2021 was 278 people by religion 148 from Greek Catholic Church, 95 from Roman Catholic Church, 14 from None, 12 from Eastern Orthodox Church, 8 from Not found out and 1 from Evangelical Church.
