= Jonathan Sacks, Baron Sacks =

British Orthodox rabbi and politician (1948–2020)

Rabbi The Right Honourable The Lord Sacks
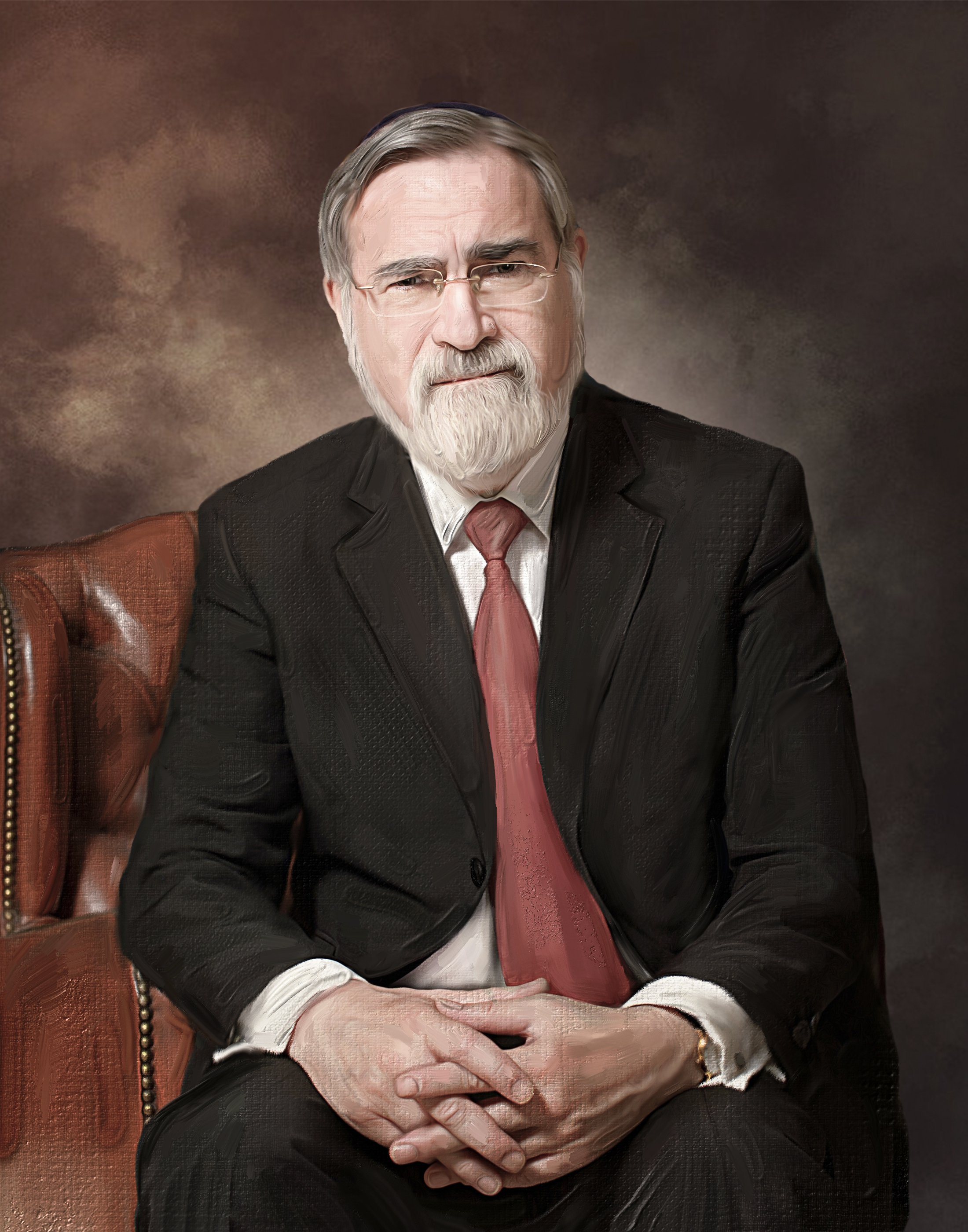
- Artistic portrait of Rabbi Jonathan Sacks

Chief Rabbi of the United Hebrew Congregations of the Commonwealth
- In office 1 September 1991 – 1 September 2013
- Preceded by: Immanuel, Lord Jakobovits
- Succeeded by: Ephraim Mirvis

Member of the House of Lords
- Lord Temporal
- Life peerage 1 September 2009 – 7 November 2020

Personal details
- Born: Jonathan Henry Sacks; 8 March 1948 Lambeth District of London, England
- Died: 7 November 2020 (aged 72) London, England
- Party: None (crossbencher)
- Spouse: Elaine Taylor (m. 1970)
- Children: 3
- Education: Gonville and Caius College, Cambridge (MA); New College, Oxford; King's College London (PhD); Christ's College, Finchley
- Occupation: Rabbi; philosopher; theologian; author
- Semicha: London School of Jewish Studies; Etz Chaim Yeshiva (London)
- Website: Official website

Jonathan Henry Sacks, Baron Sacks (Hebrew: Yaakov Zvi, יעקב צבי) (8 March 1948 – 7 November 2020) was an English Orthodox rabbi, philosopher, theologian, and author. Sacks served as the Chief Rabbi of the United Hebrew Congregations of the Commonwealth from 1991 to 2013. As the spiritual head of the United Synagogue, the largest synagogue body in the United Kingdom, he was the Chief Rabbi of those Orthodox synagogues but was not recognized as the religious authority for the Haredi Union of Orthodox Hebrew Congregations or for the progressive movements such as Conservative, Reform, and Liberal Judaism. As Chief Rabbi, he formally carried the title of Av Beit Din (head) of the London Beth Din. At the time of his death, he was the Chief Rabbi Emeritus.

After stepping down as Chief Rabbi, in addition to his international travelling and speaking engagements and prolific writing, Sacks served as the Ingeborg and Ira Rennert Global Distinguished Professor of Judaic Thought at New York University and as the Kressel and Ephrat Family University Professor of Jewish Thought at Yeshiva University. He was also appointed Professor of Law, Ethics, and the Bible at King's College London. He won the Templeton Prize (awarded for work affirming life's spiritual dimension) in 2016. He was also a Senior Fellow to the Raoul Wallenberg Centre for Human Rights.

== Early life ==
Jonathan Henry Sacks was born in the Lambeth district of London on 8 March 1948, the son of Ashkenazi Jewish textile seller Louis David Sacks (died 1996) and his wife Louisa (née Frumkin; 1919–2010), who came from a family of leading Jewish wine merchants. He had three brothers named Brian, Alan, and Eliot, all of whom eventually made aliyah. He said that his father did not have "much Jewish education".

Sacks commenced his formal education at St Mary's Primary School and at Christ's College, Finchley, his local schools. He completed his higher education at Gonville and Caius College, Cambridge, where he gained a first-class honours degree (MA) in Philosophy.

While a student at Cambridge, he travelled to New York City, where he met with rabbis Joseph Soloveitchik and Menachem Mendel Schneerson to discuss a variety of issues relating to religion, faith, and philosophy. He later wrote, "Rabbi Soloveitchik had challenged me to think, Rabbi Schneerson had challenged me to lead." Schneerson urged Sacks to seek rabbinic ordination and enter the rabbinate.

Sacks subsequently continued his postgraduate studies at New College, Oxford, and King's College London, completing a PhD which the University of London awarded him in 1982. He received his rabbinic ordination from the London School of Jewish Studies and London's Etz Chaim Yeshiva, with semikhah respectively from Rabbis Nahum Rabinovitch and Noson Ordman.

== Career ==
Sacks's first rabbinic appointment (1978–1982) was as the Rabbi for the Golders Green synagogue in London. In 1983, he became Rabbi of the Western Marble Arch Synagogue in Central London, a position he held until 1990. Between 1984 and 1990, Sacks also served as Principal of Jews' College (now London School of Jewish Studies), the United Synagogue's rabbinical seminary. Dr. Sacks was inducted to serve as Chief Rabbi of the United Hebrew Congregations of the Commonwealth on 1 September 1991, a position he held until 1 September 2013.

Sacks became a Knight Bachelor in the 2005 Birthday Honours "for services to the Community and to Inter-faith Relations". He was made an Honorary Freeman of the London Borough of Barnet in September 2006. On 13 July 2009 the House of Lords Appointments Commission announced that Sacks was recommended for a life peerage with a seat in the House of Lords. He took the title "Baron Sacks of Aldgate in the City of London" and sat as a crossbencher.

A visiting professor at several universities in Britain, the United States, and Israel, Sacks held 16 honorary degrees, including a doctorate of divinity conferred on him in September 2001 by the then Archbishop of Canterbury, George Carey, to mark his first ten years in office as Chief Rabbi. In recognition of his work, Sacks won several international awards, including the Jerusalem Prize in 1995 for his contribution to diaspora Jewish life and The Ladislaus Laszt Ecumenical and Social Concern Award from Ben Gurion University in Israel in 2011.

The author of 25 books, Sacks published commentaries on the siddur (daily prayerbook) and completed commentaries to the machzorim (festival prayerbook) for the Rosh Hashanah, Yom Kippur and Pesach. His other books include, Not in God's Name: Confronting Religious Violence, and The Great Partnership: God, Science and the Search for Meaning. His books won literary awards, including the Grawemeyer Prize for Religion in 2004 for The Dignity of Difference, and a National Jewish Book Award in 2000 for A Letter in the Scroll. Koren Publishers Jerusalem published The Koren Sacks Siddur in 2006, and is described by Koren as the "first new Orthodox Hebrew/English siddur in a generation". Covenant & Conversation: Genesis was awarded a National Jewish Book Award in 2009, and his commentary to the Passivor mahzor book won the 2013 Modern Jewish Thought and Experience Dorot Foundation Award from the Jewish Book Council in the United States. His Covenant & Conversation commentaries on the weekly Torah portion are read by thousands of people in Jewish communities around the world. In September 2025, Koren posthumously published a one-volume Torah with Masoretic Text and translation alongside his commentary as well as those commentators he had selected, including Rashi.

Sacks' contributions to wider British society have also been recognized. A regular contributor to national media, frequently appearing on BBC Radio 4's Thought for the Day or writing the Credo column or opinion pieces in The Times, Sacks was awarded The Sanford St Martin's Trust Personal Award for 2013 for "his advocacy of Judaism and religion in general". He was invited to the wedding of Prince William and Catherine Middleton as a representative of the Jewish community.

At a Gala Dinner held in Central London in May 2013 to mark the completion of the Chief Rabbi's time in office, Charles III, at the time Prince of Wales, called Sacks a "light unto this nation", "a steadfast friend" and "a valued adviser" whose "guidance on any given issue has never failed to be of practical value and deeply grounded in the kind of wisdom that is increasingly hard to come by".

=== Chief Rabbi ===
In his installation address upon succeeding Immanuel Jakobovits as Chief Rabbi of the United Hebrew Congregations of the Commonwealth in September 1991, Sacks called for a Decade of Renewal which would "revitalize British Jewry's great powers of creativity". He said this renewal should be based on five central values: "love of every Jew, love of learning, love of God, a profound contribution to British society and an unequivocal attachment to Israel." Sacks said he wanted to be "a catalyst for creativity, to encourage leadership in others, and to let in the fresh air of initiative and imagination". This led to a series of innovative communal projects including Jewish Continuity, a national foundation for Jewish educational programmes and outreach; the Association of Jewish Business Ethics; the Chief Rabbinate Awards for Excellence; the Chief Rabbinate Bursaries, and Community Development, a national scheme to enhance Jewish community life. The Chief Rabbi began his second decade of office with a call to 'Jewish Responsibility' and a renewed commitment to the ethical dimension of Judaism. He was succeeded as Chief Rabbi by Ephraim Mirvis on 1 September 2013.

== Appointments held ==
In addition to serving as Chief Rabbi, Sacks held numerous appointments during his career including:

- Professor of Judaic Thought, New York University, New York (announced 29 October 2013).
- Professor of Jewish Thought, Yeshiva University, New York (announced 29 October 2013).
- Professor of Law, Ethics and the Bible at King's College, London (announced 5 December 2013)
- Chief Rabbi of the United Kingdom and Commonwealth (1 September 1991 – 1 September 2013)
- Lecturer in moral philosophy, Middlesex Polytechnic, 1971–1973
- Lecturer, Jews' College London, 1973–82; director of its rabbinic facility, 1983–1990; Principal, 1984–1990
- Visiting professor of philosophy at the University of Essex, 1989–1990
- Sherman lecturer at the University of Manchester, 1989.
- Riddell lecturer at Newcastle University, 1993.
- Cook lecturer at the University of Oxford, University of Edinburgh and the University of St Andrews, 1996.
- Visiting professor at the Hebrew University of Jerusalem, 1998–2004.

Sacks was also a frequent guest on both television and radio, and regularly contributed to the national press. He delivered the 1990 BBC Reith Lectures on The Persistence of Faith.

== Awards and honours ==
Sacks was awarded numerous prizes, including:

- 1995: Jerusalem Prize (Israel)
- 2000: American National Jewish Book for A Letter in the Scroll
- 2004: The Grawemeyer Prize for Religion (USA)
- 2009: American National Jewish Book Award for Covenant & Conversation Genesis: The Book of Beginnings
- 2010: The Norman Lamm Prize, Yeshiva University (USA)
- 2010: The Abraham Kuyper Prize, Princeton Theological Seminary (USA)
- 2011: The Ladislaus Laszt Ecumenical and Social Concern Award, Ben Gurion University (Israel)
- 2011: Keter Torah Award, Open University (Israel)
- 2013: The Sanford St Martin's Trust Personal Award for Excellence in Religious Broadcasting
- 2013: American National Jewish Book Award for The Koren Sacks Pesah Mahzor
- 2015: American National Jewish Book Award for Not in God's Name: Confronting Religious Violence
- 2016: Templeton Prize, "has spent decades bringing spiritual insight to the public conversation through mass media, popular lectures and more than two dozen books"
- 2021: Genesis Prize Lifetime Achievement Award, awarded posthumously by Israeli President Isaac Herzog.

== Philosophy and views ==
Much has been written about Sacks' philosophical contribution to Judaism and beyond. These include: (1) a volume on his work entitled Universalizing Particularity that forms part of The Library of Contemporary Jewish Philosophers series, edited by Hava Tirosh-Samuelson and Aaron W. Hughes; (2) a book entitled Radical Responsibility edited by Michael J. Harris, Daniel Rynhold and Tamra Wright; and (3) a book entitled Morasha Kehillat Yaakov edited by Rabbi Michael Pollak and Dayan Shmuel Simons.

=== Early influences ===
In a pamphlet written to mark the completion of his time as Chief Rabbi entitled "A Judaism Engaged with the World", Sacks cites three individuals who have had a profound impact on his own philosophical thinking.

The first figure was the Lubavitcher Rebbe, Rabbi Menachem Mendel Schneerson who "was fully aware of the problem of the missing Jews... inventing the idea, revolutionary in its time, of Jewish outreach... [He] challenged me to lead." Indeed, Sacks called him "one of the greatest Jewish leaders, not just of our time, but of all time".

The second was Rabbi Joseph Soloveitchik whom Sacks described as "the greatest Orthodox thinker of the time [who] challenged me to think." Sacks argued that for Rav Soloveichik "Jewish philosophy, he said, had to emerge from halakhah, Jewish law. Jewish thought and Jewish practice were not two different things but the same thing seen from different perspectives. Halakhah was a way of living a way of thinking about the world – taking abstract ideas and making them real in everyday life."

The third figure was Rabbi Nahum Rabinovitch, a former principal of the London School of Jewish Studies. Sacks called Rabinovitch "One of the great Maimonidean scholars of our time, [who] taught us, his students, that Torah leadership demands the highest intellectual and moral courage. He did this in the best way possible: by personal example. The following thoughts, which are his, are a small indication of what I learned from him – not least that Torah is, among other things, a refusal to give easy answers to difficult questions."

=== Universalism vs particularism ===
Writing of Sacks as a rabbi, social philosopher, proponent of interfaith dialogue and a public intellectual, Tirosh-Samuelson and Hughes note that "[Sacks's] vision—informed as it is by the concerns of modern Orthodoxy—is paradoxically one of the most universalizing voices within contemporary Judaism. Sacks possesses a rare ability to hold in delicate balance the universal demands of the modern, multicultural world with the particularism associated with Judaism." This is a view supported by Rabbi Nathan Lopez Cardozo, who wrote in The Jerusalem Post that Sacks's "confidence in the power of Judaism and its infinite wisdom enabled him to enter the lion's den, taking on famous philosophers, scientists, religious thinkers and sociologists and showing them that Judaism had something to teach that they couldn't afford to miss if they wanted to be at the forefront of philosophy and science." Harris and Rynhold, in their introduction to Radical Responsibility, argued: "The special contribution made by the thought of Chief Rabbi Sacks is that it not only continues the venerable Jewish philosophical tradition of maintaining traditional faith in the face of external intellectual challenges, but also moves beyond this tradition by showing how core Jewish teachings can address the dilemmas of the secular world itself. What make Lord Sacks' approach so effective is that he is able to do so without any exception of the wider world taking on Judaism's theological beliefs."

=== Torah v'Chokhma ===
The framework for Sacks' philosophical approach and his interaction between the universal and the particular is not too dissimilar from those positions adopted by other leading Orthodox thinkers of recent times. The favoured phrase of Rabbi Samson Raphael Hirsch was Torah im derekh eretz, 'Torah with general culture'; for Rabbi Norman Lamm it was Torah u-mada, 'Torah and Science'. For Sacks, his favoured phrase was Torah vehokhmah, 'Torah and Wisdom'. As noted in the introduction to Radical Responsibility: "Torah, for Jonathan Sacks represents the particularistic, inherited teachings of Judaism, while hokhmah (wisdom) refers to the universal realm of the sciences and humanities." Framed in religious terms, as Sacks sets out in his book Future Tense:

"Chokhmah is the truth we discover; Torah is the truth we inherit. Chokhmah is the universal language of humankind; Torah is the specific heritage of Israel. Chokhmah is what we attain by being in the image of God; Torah is what guides Jews as the people of God. Chokhmah is acquired by seeing and reasoning; Torah is received by listening and responding. Chokhmah tells us what is; Torah tells us what ought to be."

Tirosh-Samuelson and Hughes are of the opinion that whilst Torah v'Chokhmah is certainly a valid overarching framework, they note that Sacks' perspective is one rooted in modern orthodoxy: "Although he will try to understand various denominations of Judaism, he is always quick to point out that Orthodoxy cannot recognize the legitimacy of interpretations of Judaism that abandon fundamental beliefs of halakhic (Jewish law) authority. Judaism that departs from the truth and acceptance of the halakha is a departure from authentic Judaism and, he reasons, is tantamount to the accommodation of secularism. So, while Sacks will develop a highly inclusive account of the world's religions, there were times when he was critical of the denominations within Judaism."

=== "No one creed has a monopoly on spiritual truth" ===
After the publication of his book The Dignity of Difference, a group of Haredi rabbis, most notably Rabbis Yosef Shalom Elyashiv and Bezalel Rakow, accused Sacks of heresy against what they consider the traditional Orthodox viewpoint. According to them, some words seemed to imply an endorsement of pure relativism between religions, and that Judaism is not the sole true religion, e.g. "No one creed has a monopoly on spiritual truth." This led him to rephrase more clearly some sentences in the book for its second edition, though he refused to recall books already in the stores.

In his "Preface to the Second Edition" of the book, Sacks wrote that certain passages in the book had been misconstrued: He had already explicitly criticised cultural and religious relativism in his book, and he did not deny Judaism's uniqueness. He also stressed, however, that mainstream rabbinic teachings teach that wisdom, righteousness, and the possibility of a true relationship with God are all available in non-Jewish cultures and religions as an ongoing heritage from the covenant that God made with Noah and all his descendants, so the tradition teaches that one does not need to be Jewish to know God or truth, or to attain salvation. As this diversity of covenantal bonds implies, however, traditional Jewish sources do clearly deny that any one creed has a monopoly on spiritual truth. Monopolistic and simplistic claims of universal truth he has characterized as imperialistic, pagan and Platonic, and not Jewish at all. The book received international acclaim, winning the Grawemeyer Award for Religion in 2004.

=== Efforts to accommodate Haredi Jews ===
A book by the British historian and journalist Meir Persoff, Another Way, Another Time, has argued that "Sacks's top priority has been staying in the good graces of the Haredi, or strictly Orthodox, faction, whose high birthrate has made it the fastest-growing component of British Jewry."

=== Relationship with the non-Orthodox denominations ===
In 1990, when he was Chief Rabbi-elect, he wrote to Sidney Brichto, a Liberal rabbi, about Brichto's 1987 proposals. Brichto had advocated for a historical compromise between the Orthodox rabbinate and the non-Orthodox denominations. Among the proposals were radical changes to the conversion process for prospective converts in the non-Orthodox streams. These streams would stop processing their own conversions to Judaism. Instead, their prospective converts would have their status conferred on them by an Orthodox Beit Din. The Beit Din would be expected to show more leniency than usual, only expecting that those before them demonstrate knowledge of Orthodox practice rather than observance.

The proposal had been rejected by the incumbent Chief Rabbi, Immanuel Jakobovits, Baron Jakobovits. However, in his letter to Brichto, Sacks wrote: "As soon as I read your article. ... I called it publicly 'the most courageous statement by a non-Orthodox Jew this century'. I felt it was a genuine way forward. Others turned out not to share my view." He continued: "It will be a while—18 months—before I take up office. But I believe we can still explore that way forward together. For if we do not move forward, I fear greatly for our community and for Am Yisrael."

Sacks provoked considerable controversy in the Anglo-Jewish community in 1996 when he refused to attend the funeral service of the late Reform Rabbi Hugo Gryn and for a private letter he had written in Hebrew, which (in translation) asserted that Auschwitz survivor Gryn was "among those who destroy the faith", was leaked and published. He wrote further that he was an "enemy" of the Reform, Liberal and Masorti movements, leading some to reject the notion that he was "Chief Rabbi" for all Jews in Britain. He attended a memorial meeting for Gryn, a move that brought the wrath of some in the ultra-Orthodox community. Rabbi Dow Marmur, a Canada-based progressive Rabbi, argued that after attending the memorial service, Sacks then attempted to placate the ultra-Orthodox community, an attempt which Marmur has described as "neurotic and cowardly."

Later, in a letter to The Jewish Chronicle in May 2013, Jackie Gryn, the widow of Rabbi Hugo Gryn, wrote: "I feel the time has come for me to lay to rest, once and for all, the idea … that there ever was a 'Hugo Gryn Affair', as far as I am concerned, regarding the absence of the Chief Rabbi at the funeral of my late husband, Hugo… From the beginning, relations were cordial and sympathetic and have remained so", she wrote. "There has never been any personal grievance between us concerning his non-attendance at the funeral, which promoted such venomous and divisive comments and regrettably continues to do so."

Sacks responded to the incident by rethinking his relationship with the non-Orthodox movements, eventually developing what he called the "two principles". Responding to an interview shortly before his retirement, he wrote that "You try and make things better in the future. As a result of the turbulence at that time, I was forced to think this whole issue through and I came up with these two principles; on all matters that affect us as Jews regardless of our religious differences we work together regardless of our religious differences, and on all things that touch our religious differences we agree to differ, but with respect. As a result of those two principles, relations between Reform and Orthodox have got much better and are actually a model for the rest of the Jewish world. Progressive rabbis sit with me on the top table of the Council of Christians and Jews, we stand together for Israel. All of this flowed from those two principles. Until then there had been a view never to do anything with the non-Orthodox movements but once you thought it through you saw that there were all sorts of opportunities."

Sacks years earlier (2004) drew some criticism when he and his beit din prevented the retired Rabbi Louis Jacobs, who had helped establish the British branch of the Masorti movement, from being called up for the reading of the Torah on the Saturday before his granddaughter's wedding.

=== Secularism and Europe's changing demographics ===
Sacks expressed concern at what he regarded as the negative effects of materialism and secularism in European society, arguing that they undermined the basic values of family life and lead to selfishness. In 2009, Sacks gave an address claiming that Europeans have chosen consumerism over the self-sacrifice of parenting children, and that "the major assault on religion today comes from the neo-Darwinians". He argued that Europe is in population decline "because non-believers lack shared values of family and community that religion has".

=== Consumerism and Steve Jobs ===
Sacks made remarks at an inter-faith reception attended by the Queen, in November 2011, in which he criticised what he believed to be the selfish consumer culture that has only brought unhappiness. "The consumer society was laid down by the late Steve Jobs coming down the mountain with two tablets, iPad one and iPad two, and the result is that we now have a culture of iPod, iPhone, iTune, i, i, i. When you're an individualist, egocentric culture and you only care about 'I', you don't do terribly well." In a later statement, the Chief Rabbi's office said "The Chief Rabbi meant no criticism of either Steve Jobs personally or the contribution Apple has made to the development of technology in the 21st century."

=== Position on gay marriage ===
In July 2012 a group of prominent British Jews criticised Sacks for opposing plans to allow civil marriage for gays and lesbians. He said that he understood "the fear that gays have of prejudice and persecution" and went on to say, in a lecture on the institution of marriage, that a world that persecutes homosexuals is one "to which we should never return."

I fully understood... that gays, not just Jews, were sent to the concentration camps, and I did not want to become a voice that would be caught up in a very polarised debate and be seen to be heartless towards the gays in our own community. I am not heartless towards them, I really seek to understand them and they seek to understand where I am coming from. – Rabbi Jonathan Sacks

=== Interfaith dialogue ===
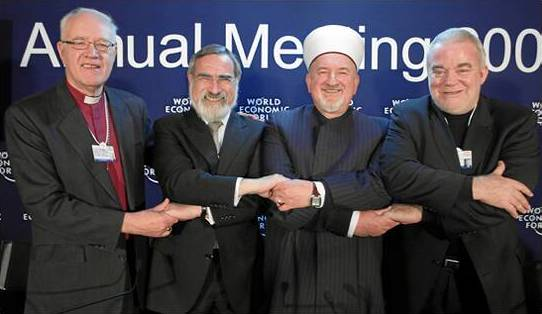
Jonathan Sacks (second from left) with George Carey, Mustafa Cerić, and Jim Wallis at the 2009 World Economic Forum

Sacks was an advocate of interfaith dialogue and sat on the Board of World Religious Leaders for the Elijah Interfaith Institute.

=== Politics in the United States ===
In October 2017, Jonathan Sacks inveighed against a "politics of anger" he said was corroding the fabric of U.S. society. "The politics of anger that's emerged in our time is full of danger," Sacks said. He decried the breakdown of American society into narrower and narrower identities that nurtured a "culture of grievances." Sacks warned that "The social contract is still there, but the social covenant is being lost."

=== On antisemitism ===
In a June 2019 debate on anti-Semitism in the House of Lords, Sacks stated that "there is hardly a country in the world, certainly not a single country in Europe, where Jews feel safe" and that societies tolerating anti-Semitism had "forfeited all moral credibility". Additionally, Sacks equated anti-Semitism to a "mutating virus".

== Public lectures ==
In 2013, Sacks delivered the twenty-sixth Erasmus Lecture, titled On Creative Minorities, hosted by First Things magazine and the Institute on Religion and Public Life. In his lecture, Sacks discussed the role of faith communities as “creative minorities” that sustain moral and cultural vitality in societies experiencing secularization and fragmentation. Drawing on historical, theological, and sociological insights, he urged religious groups to engage the public sphere constructively while remaining faithful to their traditions.

== Publications ==
As author

- The Koren Shalem Humash (Koren, 2025) ISBN 9789657765173
- I Believe: A Weekly reading of the Jewish Bible (Koren, 2022) ISBN 9781592645961
- Studies in Spirituality: A Weekly reading of the Jewish Bible (Koren, 2021) ISBN 9781592645763
- Judaism's Life-Changing Ideas: A Weekly reading of the Jewish Bible (Koren, 2020) ISBN 9781592645527
- Morality: Restoring the Common Good in Divided Times (Hodder & Stoughton, 2020) ISBN 9781473617315
- Covenant & Conversation: Deuteronomy: Renewal of the Sinai Covenant (Koren, 2019) ISBN 9781592640232
- Covenant & Conversation: Numbers: the Wilderness Years (Koren, 2017) ISBN 9781592640232
- Essays on Ethics: A Weekly Reading of the Jewish Bible (Koren, 2016) ISBN 9781592644490
- Lessons in Leadership: A Weekly Reading of the Jewish Bible (Koren, 2015) ISBN 9781592644322
- Not in God's Name: Confronting Religious Violence (Hodder & Stoughton, 2015) ISBN 9781473616516
- Covenant & Conversation: Leviticus, the Book of Holiness (Koren, 2015) ISBN 9781592640225
- The Koren Sacks Pesach Mahzor (Koren, 2013) ISBN 9789653013179
- The Koren Sacks Yom Kippur Mahzor (Koren, 2012) ISBN 9789653013469
- The Koren Sacks Rosh Hashana Mahzor (Koren, 2011) ISBN 9789653013421
- The Great Partnership: God Science and the Search for Meaning (Hodder & Stoughton, 2011) ISBN 9780340995259
- Covenant and Conversation: Exodus (Koren, Jerusalem, 2010) ISBN 9781592640218
- Future Tense (Hodder & Stoughton, 2009) ISBN 9780340979853
- Covenant and Conversation: Genesis (Koren, 2009) ISBN 9781592640201
- The Koren (Sacks) Siddur (Koren, 2009) ISBN 9789653012172
- The Home We Build Together (Continuum, 2007) ISBN 9780826423498
- Authorised Daily Prayer Book (HarperCollins, 2006) ISBN 9780007200917
- To Heal a Fractured World (Continuum, 2005) ISBN 9780826480392
- From Optimism to Hope (Continuum, 2004) ISBN 9780826474810
- Rabbi Jonathan Sacks's Haggadah (Harper Collins, 2003) ISBN 9789653013421
- The Dignity of Difference (Continuum, 2002) ISBN 9780826468505
- Radical Then, Radical Now (published in the US as A Letter in the Scroll) (Continuum, 2001) ISBN 9780826473363
- Celebrating Life (Continuum, 2006) ISBN 9780826473370
- Morals and Markets (Occasional Paper 108) (Institute of Economic Affairs, 1998) ISBN 0255364245
- The Politics of Hope (Vintage, 2000) ISBN 9780224043298
- The Persistence of Faith (Continuum, 2005) - based on his BBC Reith Lectures series ISBN 9780297820857
- One People: Tradition, Modernity and Jewish Unity (The Littman Library, 1993) ISBN 9781874774013
- Community of Faith (Peter Halban, 1995) ISBN 9781870015592
- Faith in the Future (Darton, Longman and Todd, 1995) ISBN 9780232520989
- Will We Have Jewish Grandchildren? (Vallentine Mitchell, 1994) ISBN 9780853032823
- Crisis and Covenant (Manchester University Press, 1992) ISBN 0719033004
- Arguments for the Sake of Heaven (Jason Aronson, 1991) ISBN 0876687834
- Tradition in an Untraditional Age (Vallentine Mitchell, 1990) ISBN 0853032394

As editor

- Torah Studies: Discourses by Rabbi Menachem M. Schneerson (Kehot, New York, 1996) ISBN 0826604935
- Orthodoxy Confronts Modernity (Ktav, New York, 1991) ISBN 0881253634
- Tradition and Transition (Jews College Publications, 1986) ISBN 095121490X

=== Festschrift ===
- Pollak, Michael; Simons, Shmuel, eds. (2014). Morasha kehillat Yaakov : essays in honour of Chief Rabbi Lord Jonathan Sacks. London: London Beth Din. ISBN 9781592643905.

== Personal life ==
Sacks married Elaine Taylor in 1970, and together they had three children: Joshua, Dina and Gila. He was a vegetarian.

== Death ==
Sacks died in London on 7 November 2020, at the age of 72. He had been diagnosed with cancer a month earlier, having been twice previously treated for the disease.

Prime Minister Boris Johnson said that Sacks' leadership had a "profound impact on our whole country and across the world". Rabbi Meir Soloveichik wrote a tribute piece in the Wall Street Journal entitled "What Gentiles can Learn from Lord Sacks". Awarding the 2021 Genesis Prize Lifetime Achievement Award to Rabbi Sacks posthumously in late 2021, Israeli President Isaac Herzog paid tribute to him and praised him as "a master articulator of the Jewish foundation of universal values" who "unapologetically verbalized a proud, dignified Jewish identity."

Jewish titles
Preceded by Immanuel Jakobovits, Lord Jakobovits	Chief Rabbi of Great Britain and the Commonwealth; 1991–2013	Succeeded by Ephraim Mirvis
