= Torah Educational Software =

Jerusalem-based Judaic software distributor

Torah Educational Software (TES) is a distributor of Judaic software based in Jerusalem. Its product Let's Keep Kosher received a rabbinical endorsement.

== Software for Jewish texts ==
- A 1996 followup to a 1994 Davka-vs-TES (Torah Educational Software) comparison of Jewish texts on CD-ROM began by listing the winner: "The competition ... has led to an apparent winner: the consumer!"
- A University of California Press 34 page overview of tools for Talmudic study, especially related to Daf Yomi, gives Artscroll top billing, but in the area of non-print and non-voice, TES is noted for its Gemara Tutor and Talmud Master software.
- Dagesh is the name of their multi-language wordprocessing program, including Hebrew, English, Russian, and Arabic; Dagesh-Pro Translator is bi-directional for Hebrew and English.

== See also ==
- Bar Ilan Responsa Project
- Nonviolent video game#Jewish games
