= Shas (disambiguation) =

Shas or SHAS may refer to:

- Shas, Israeli political party
- Shisha Sedarim, the Six Orders of Mishnah and Talmud
  - Vilna Edition Shas
- Šas, village in Montenegro
- Sacred Heart Apostolic School
- Mohd Fadhli Mohd Shas, footballer
