= Abraham Weiss =

American Talmudist and academic

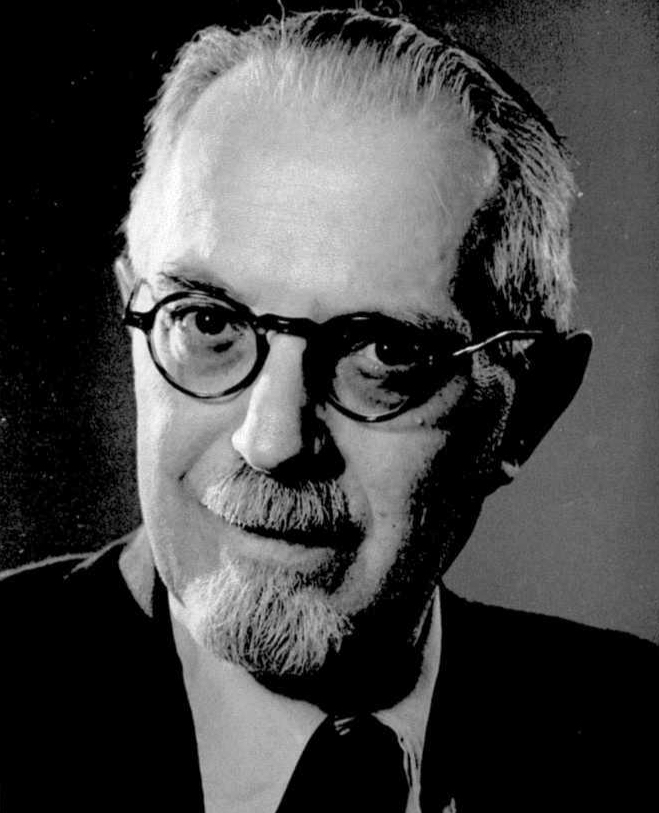
- Born: 1895

Abraham Weiss (1895–1970) was professor of Talmud at Yeshiva University in New York from 1940 to 1967. He is best known for his contribution to the development of the scientific study of Talmud. A noted Talmudic scholar, both in the traditional and academic sense, he is credited with delineating a methodology for a critical textual based study of Talmud.

== Biography ==
Weiss was born in Podhajce, Galicia, where he received a traditional Jewish education. In 1916 he was given ordination from David Horowitz, the Rabbi of Stanislaw, and the following year Weiss entered the University of Vienna. In 1921 he completed a Ph.D. in History and Classical Philology, the topic of the dissertation being, "The Relationship of the Popes to the Jews During the Middle Ages". Throughout this period Weiss continued his Talmudic studies under the guidance of Rabbi Aptowitzer, from whom he received an additional certificate of ordination in 1922.

In 1928 Weiss was invited to serve as Docent for Talmud at the Institute for Jewish Science in Warsaw, Poland. During his time there Weiss was tremendously involved in Zionist activities and Jewish communal affairs. Most notably, Weiss served as vice president of the Mizrachi Organization of Poland (1935–1940), and was appointed to the Jewish Committee (judenrat) of Warsaw. It was in this latter capacity that Weiss helped delay the implementation of the creation of the Warsaw ghetto.

In 1940 Weiss was offered a position at Yeshiva University of Professor of Talmud. He accepted and traveled to the United States with his family, escaping the Nazi Holocaust. He remained at Yeshiva University for over a quarter of a century, with positions within both the undergraduate university and the Bernard Revel Graduate School of Jewish Studies. In 1967, Weiss retired from his post at Yeshiva University and moved to Israel. In Israel, Weiss lectured at Bar-Ilan University until his death in 1970. His sons are Dr. Moshe Weiss and Prof. Benjamin Weiss. His brother in law was the noted Talmudic scholar Hanoch Albeck.

== Thoughts ==
Weiss' research focused on a critical study of the Babylonian Talmud. While previous investigators of the history of the Talmud predominantly sought their information from external sources, Weiss believed that any study of Talmud requires an extensive textual analysis in addition to a conceptual analysis; a method that was later coined the "inside-outside approach". He began with an analysis of the use of terms that indicate a quotation of sources, then moved on to later and earlier elements within Talmudic discussion, and into their significance for chapters, tractates, and for the Talmud as a literary entity.

One of Weiss' conclusions is the opinion that the Talmud was a continuous process from the time of the Amora'im until the time of the Geonim. This was a break from the previously held notion that the final editing of the Talmud occurred at the hands of Ravina and Rav Ashi, two late Amora'im.

His studies on the Babylonian Talmud's evolution and the Saboraic and early Gaonic activities opened many new avenues in the development of Talmud and in the interpretation of Talmudic law.

Compared to the Babylonian Talmud, the Jerusalem Talmud is generally seen as an unclear and difficult to understand. Weiss argued that rather than the Jerusalem Talmud being a corrupted version of an original clear text, it is the unchanged version of the original text, whereas the Babylonian Talmud (which originally resembled the Jerusalem Talmud in level of clarity, he argued) was edited by later generations to add explanations, connective passages, and source citations.

Weiss argued that rather than there originally being "one [Babylonian] Talmud", there were "many Talmuds", as every academy produced its own Talmud covering specific tractates, and our Babylonian Talmud is mostly derived from the Talmud of the academy of Pumbeditha. He argues that the Pumbeditha academy never produced Talmud on the Mishnaic orders of Zeraim and Taharot, so no "Babylonian Talmud" on those subjects ever existed, while occasional Talmud material on those subjects which is quoted elsewhere in the Babylonian Talmud is taken from the Talmuds of other academies.

Weiss saw evidence of textual development in the Mishna similar to that in the Talmud. For example, in Mishna Shabbat 4:1-3 he discerns three levels: an early anonymous Mishnah; additions from early Tannaim (around or before the destruction of the Temple); additions from late Tannaim (after the Bar Kochba revolt).

Regarding other Tannaitic halachic works (Tosefta and halachic midrashim), which the Talmud sometimes quotes but sometimes decides halacha in contradiction to - Weiss argued that different passages (sugyot) in the Talmud were composed by different authors, some of whom had access to the Tosefta or midrashim, some of whom did not.

== Publications ==
- Le-korot Hithavvut Ha-Bavli (1929) Warsaw
- Ha-Talmud Bavli Bi-Hithavvuto Ha-Siferutit vol. I–II(1937, 1939) Warsaw
- Hithavvut ha-Talmud bi-Shelemuto (1943), New York
- Le-Ḥeker ha-Talmud (1954) New York
- Al ha-Yeẓirah ha-Sifrutit shel ha-Amora'im (1962). New York
- Seder ha-Diyyun; Meḥkarim be-Mishpat ha-Talmud (1957) New York
- Diyyunim u-Verurim be-Bava Kamma (1966). New York
- Le-Ḥeker ha-Sifruti shel ha-Mishnah (HUCA, 16 (1941), 1–33, Heb. sect.).
