= Liverpool Talmudical College =

Yeshiva in Liverpool, UK

Coordinates: 53.394°N 2.901°W

The Liverpool Talmudical College (Hebrew: Yeshiva Torat Chaim) was a Yeshiva established in 1914 to provide a higher religious education in Liverpool; it was preceded by a Talmud Torah established in c. 1895. It educated some 200 students a year. It was originally based at the New Central Synagogue (Shaw Street Shul). In 1938 it accepted refugees from Nazi Germany and residential accommodation for the refugees was organised. As Liverpool was a restricted area excluding 'enemy aliens', the College temporarily moved to St Asaph in North Wales. It later moved to self-contained premises in Church Road, Wavertree, a residential district of south Liverpool. With the decline of the Jewish community in Liverpool fewer children enrolled and in the early 1990s the classes moved to the Childwall Synagogue. Amongst its graduates is Rabbi Eli Cashdan.
