= Amélie Jakobovits =

Rebbetzin The Right Honourable The Lady Jakobovits
- Born: Amélie Munk; 31 May 1928; Ansbach, Bavaria, Germany
- Died: 7 May 2010 (aged 81); Royal Free Hospital, London, England
- Resting place: Mount of Olives, Israel
- Occupation: charity patron
- Known for: "Queen Mother" of the UK's Jewish community
- Spouse: Immanuel Jakobovits, Baron Jakobovits (married c. 1947)
- Children: 6
- Parent(s): Elie Munk; Fanny Frumet Goldberger

Amélie Jakobovits, Baroness Jakobovits (née Munk; 31 May 1928 – 7 May 2010) was a British charity patron, and the wife of Immanuel Jakobovits, Chief Rabbi of the United Hebrew Congregations of the Commonwealth, and an important figure in Jewish life in the UK in her own right, who was known as the "Queen Mother" of the UK's Jewish community.

== Early life ==
She was born Amélie Munk on 31 May 1928 in Ansbach, Bavaria, Germany, the daughter of Elie Munk (1900–1981), a rabbi and rabbinic scholar, and his wife, Fanny Frumet Munk, née Goldberger (1906–1979). They moved to Paris in 1936 and, after the Nazi invasion, to Switzerland in 1940, remaining there until Paris was liberated.

== Career ==
Unusually in Orthodox Jewish life, she mediated between her husband and Menachem Mendel Schneerson, who was the Lubavitcher Rebbe, leader of one of the largest Hassidic groups, on matters relating to Israel. Her husband was far more of a "dove", and Schneerson was quite "hawkish". This was made possible by a longstanding connection between them – she had even played football as a child with Schneerson in pre-war France.

She led the first marches in support of the Soviet Jewry movement, supporting Jews being allowed to leave the Eastern Bloc for resettlement in Israel.

She did extensive charity work, including Yad Sarah, Emunah and Kisharon. After her husband died, she became known as the "Queen Mother" of the UK's Jewish community.

== Personal life ==
Through a family friend she met her future husband Immanuel Jakobovits, who proposed to her at the top of the Eiffel Tower. They had two sons and four daughters.

She was a cousin of Deborah Lipstadt, the American writer on the Holocaust.

== Later life ==
She died at the Royal Free Hospital, London, of bronchopneumonia and heart failure, on 7 May 2010. Her death was mourned by a crowd of 5,000 on the Shirehall Estate in Hendon, London, where she had lived in her later years. She was buried next to her husband on the Mount of Olives, Israel.
