= Soncino Press =

British publishing house

- Status: Active
- Country of origin: United Kingdom
- Headquarters location: London
- Distribution: Worldwide
- Publication types: Books

Soncino Press is a Jewish publishing company based in the United Kingdom that has published a variety of books of Jewish interest, most notably English translations and commentaries to the Talmud and Hebrew Bible. The Soncino Hebrew Bible and Talmud translations and commentaries were widely used in both Orthodox and Conservative synagogues until the advent of other translations beginning in the 1990s.

== Acceptance ==
The Soncino translations and commentaries are based, largely, on traditional Jewish sources. They accept the Bible as divine and the biblical history of The Exodus from Egypt and the giving of the Torah to Moses at biblical Mount Sinai as true, and had been generally regarded as Orthodox. Nonetheless, they tended to have some input from Christian and modern academic scholarship and tended not to treat rabbinical Midrash and Aggadah as fact. The Terms and Abbreviations page lists Authorized Version and Revised Version, both of which include New Testament; the latter term is found in Soncino's Talmud.

These works, which passed their half century over two decades ago, have seen their acceptance change. As Orthodox and Conservative Judaism have diverged in recent decades, they have tended to move to different Bible translations reflecting their increasingly different theological viewpoints.

- Orthodox Jews are now more likely to use ArtScroll translations, which shun academic scholarship and treat Midrashic and Aggadic accounts, as well as the Biblical text, as literally true.
- Conservative Judaism has moved in the opposite direction, publishing a commentary, the Etz Hayim Bible, which is considerably more liberal in tone, based on academic sources that accept the documentary hypothesis as the Bible's origin and question the accuracy of its accounts of Jewish history.

Nonetheless, Soncino books still retain a following, particularly among traditional Conservative and some Modern Orthodox Jews in the English-speaking world.

A full page was devoted in The Jewish Press to the Soncino Classics Collection CD-ROM in 2003.

No popular Jewish translation with Soncino's intermediate approach, combining traditionalist outlook and exegesis with openness towards Christian and academic scholarship, has appeared since.

Additionally, because the Soncino publications were generally released without copyright notices at a time when notices were mandatory for establishment of copyright, the works were generally considered as public domain. Legally, however, this is no longer the case in the United States since 1994. (Note: In the United Kingdom, and other contemporary signatories to the Berne Convention, a copyright notice was never required to establish copyright. In the United States copyright for such works originally published overseas was re-established by the Uruguay Round Agreements Act (URAA) of 1994. Copyright was restored for works still in copyright in their native countries as of 1 January 1996. The term of copyright in the UK at the time was life + 70 years, so U.S. copyright was restored for all UK-originating works whose authors were still alive on 1 January 1926 or were born after that date. Under current U.S. law the works will now remain in copyright until the end of a period of 95 years from first publication.)

== History ==
The firm is named for the Soncino family of Hebrew book printing pioneers. Based in Northern Italy, this family published the first-ever printed book in Hebrew type in 1483 (an edition of the Talmud tractate Berakhot) and continued a string of printed editions of the Hebrew Bible, Talmud, and various rabbinical works until about 1547.

== Soncino Books of the Bible ==
The Soncino Books of the Bible is a set of Hebrew Bible commentaries, covering the whole Tanakh in fourteen volumes, published by the Soncino Press. The first volume to appear was Psalms in 1945, and the last was Chronicles in 1952. The series was edited by Abraham Cohen and the commentary was written by several rabbis including Cohen himself, Eli Cashdan, Harry Freedman and Israel Wolf Slotki (identified as I. W. Slotki) (1884–1973).

Each volume contains the Hebrew and English texts of the Hebrew Bible in parallel columns, with a running commentary below them. The Hebrew text in Psalms was originally that of Christian D. Ginsburg's earlier (1894) edition. This led to protests, since Ginsburg had converted to Christianity, so subsequent volumes used a (completely reset) copy of Meir Letteris' second (1866) edition of the Hebrew text. Both Hebrew texts are scrupulous versions of the Masoretic Text, so the differences between them are small. The English translation is the Jewish Publication Society of America Version of 1917.

=== First edition ===
The commentary in the first edition of the series drew mainly upon classical Jewish sources (see below), but also drew upon the best of early-to-mid 20th century Bible scholarship, including the work of Christian expositors.

The Soncino Chumash, covering the Torah and Haftaras, first published in 1947 and frequently reprinted has only the views of the most important medieval Jewish commentators, such as Abraham ibn Ezra, Rashi, Rashbam, Ramban, Sforno, Radak, and Ralbag (Gersonides), but no modern or Christian source references, so as not to duplicate the book The Pentateuch and Haftarahs edited by Chief Rabbi Joseph H. Hertz, also published by the Soncino Press.

=== Second edition ===
A second edition of all books other than the Soncino Chumash appeared in the 1990s, edited by Rabbi Abraham J. Rosenberg (a disciple of Rabbi Moshe Feinstein), who had previously done a Bible commentary for Judaica Press and a Mishnah commentary for Artscroll. In this edition, all work from historical scholars and Christian bible commentators has been removed; it has been replaced by additional references to the Midrash literature and medieval Jewish commentators.

== Soncino Talmud ==
The Soncino Talmud was published from 1935–1952, under the general editorship of Rabbi Isidore Epstein. The translation is distributed both on its own (18 volumes) and in a parallel text edition (35 volumes), in which each English page faces the Aramaic/Hebrew page; it was available also on CD-ROM, as below.

Overview of the volumes of the 35 and 18 volume editions
Seder	Volumes		First edition		Reprinted
Seder	35 vols. ed.	18 vols. ed.	35 vols. ed.	18 vols. ed.	35 vols. ed.
Zeraim (Agriculture)	2	1	1948	1961	1960
Moed (Holidays)	8	4	1938	1961	1956
Nashim (Family)	8	4	1937	1961	1956
Nezikin (Damages)	8	4	1935	1961	1952, 1956
Kodashim (Sacrifices)	6	3	1948	1961	1960
Tohorot (Purity)	2	1	1948	1961	1960
Index vol.	1	1	1952	1961	n/a

The work provides a precise and concise literal translation, with detailed footnotes referencing the classical commentaries. Each of the six Sedarim has its own introduction, and the introduction to each of the individual Tractates includes a topic-summary for each chapter.

Each volume had its own translator, drawn from a group of Orthodox Anglo-Jewish Rabbis and scholars (these include Rabbis H. Freedman and Eli Cashdan; see for a listing); Rabbi Epstein reviewed each translation, to an extent ensuring consistency in form and notation, and provided footnotes and cross references as required.

Subsequent to publishing the translation, Soncino released an index in a separate volume; a translation of the Minor Tractates was also published, as was a translation of the Mishnah, with detailed notes, for those tractates without Gemara.

The work was used by beginning students and laymen through the 1980s, although has largely been supplanted by the Schottenstein (ArtScroll) and Steinsaltz (Koren) translations. One observation, is that relative to these, the Soncino "has limited value in helping one understand the ... progression of ideas at large," functioning rather as a translation; the index is still considered valuable.

== Translations of classical works ==
Among many books on Jewish topics, both translations and original works, Soncino Press has also published a number of other classical works, including the following. Soncino's Midrash Rabbah comprises a translation, with brief commentaries in its footnotes. The Soncino Haggadah is a translation and commentary on the Haggadah by Cecil Roth with the Hebrew text of Koren Publishers.

- Soncino Midrash Rabbah
- Soncino Zohar
- Soncino Haggadah

== CD-ROM – Soncino Classics Collection ==
Davka released a CD-ROM, Soncino Classics Collection, that contains:

- Hebrew and English of Tanach (not including the Soncino commentary)
- Aramaic and English and commentary of the Soncino Talmud
- Soncino Midrash Rabbah
- Soncino Zohar

== See also ==
- ArtScroll
- Hebrew Publishing Company
- Kehot Publication Society
