= Pinchas Toledano =

Chief Sephardi Rabbi of Amsterdam

Pinchas Toledano (פנחס טולידאנו) is Hakham-Emeritus (Chief Rabbi) of Amsterdam and of the Spanish and Portuguese Jews of the Netherlands. He was also the official Av Beit Din, head of the court, of the Netherlands Beit Din.

== Biography ==
He studied under his father, Baruch Avraham Toledano, and also attended various yeshivot in England and Israel, receiving semikha—ordination—at age 20. He is also a certified shochet (ritual slaughterer), sofer (scribe) and mohel (circumciser).

In 1969 he received a BA Hons in Semitics from the University of London. In 1980 he received his PhD from London, his dissertation focusing on the relationship between Rashi and the Targumim.

In 1974 he was appointed Dayan (rabbinic judge) of the Sephardi Community of London and in 1980 was Av Bet Din. In 1998, he was appointed Dayan of the Dutch Sephardi Beth Din. He was appointed as Hakham of the Spanish and Portuguese community of the Netherlands in 2012. Since 2020 he is Hakham-Emeritus.

== Works ==
Dayan P. Toledano is author of several scholarly works. Among these are:

- Berit Shalom, which collects his Rabbinical Responsa in 3 volumes, the largest bulk of which deals with the issue of mamzerim
- Meqor haBerakhah (מקור הברכה), a code of Jewish Law with notes, commentary, and sources as based on contemporary poskim in 4 volumes:

1. Prayers, Blessings
2. Shabbat and Moadim
3. Various Current Laws in Yore Dea
4. Everlasting Life - Mourning Laws
It contains approbations from both Rav Ovadia Yosef and Rav Mordechai Eliyahu, and both have written notes in the volume on points in which they disagree with the Dayan. An English rendition of this work, published as Fountain of Blessings (ISBN 978-1870216029), was also released as a 2-volume set (each volume containing two of the volumes from the original four-volume publication).

- The Bene Israel of India, focusing on the controversy surrounding the Bene Israel, and remonstrating the Sephardic community and State of Israel for its rejection of them. (ISBN 978-0950108636).

== See also ==
- Spanish and Portuguese Jews
- Chief Rabbis of Amsterdam
