= London School of Jewish Studies =

London-based Jewish college

The London School of Jewish Studies (commonly known as LSJS, originally founded as Jews' College) is a London-based organisation providing adult educational courses and teacher training to the wider Jewish community.

Many leading figures in British Jewry have been associated with the School, including Michael Friedländer, Principal from 1865 to 1907; Isidore Epstein, Principal 1948–1961; Louis Jacobs, Moral Tutor 1959–1961; Jonathan Sacks (later Lord Sacks), Principal 1984–1990 and in recent years Ephraim Mirvis, Chief Rabbi of the UK and Commonwealth.

Translation works, including for Tanach and the Talmud, were made by "Scholars involved with Jews' College."

== History ==
The London School of Jewish Studies was founded as Jews' College in 1855, a rabbinical seminary in London. The organisation was re-focused and given its present name in 1999, with an emphasis on providing a broader range of adult educational courses and training to the wider Jewish community. The rabbinical training programme was suspended, and much of the historical holdings of the library were sold off. LSJS has had growing success in its new role, and started offered rabbinical training again in 2012, in partnership with the programme set up by the London Sephardi community.

=== Jews' College ===
Jews' College was opened in Finsbury Square, London, as a rabbinical seminary in 1855 with the support of Chief Rabbi Nathan Adler and of Sir Moses Montefiore, who had conceived the idea for such a venture as early as 1841. The college quickly established itself as a place where high quality rabbinical training was available and its alumni and staff often became prominent in Anglo-Jewry.

In 1881, the College moved to larger premises in Tavistock Square, close to University College, where it was envisaged that Jews' College students would be able to combine their religious studies and university studies to degree level. As early as 1904, the University of London granted an Honours degree in Hebrew and Aramaic, all of the candidates being from Jews' College. In 1932, with the building of Woburn House, a centre for Anglo-Jewry, still in Tavistock Square, Jews' College moved again.

During the Second World War, despite the bombing of London, the College kept its doors open. Apart from the rabbinical studies and degree course, Chazzanut courses and teacher training programmes were now offered.

In 1954, the College moved, yet again, to larger premises in Montagu Place. That building in central London was sold in the early 1980s and now houses the Embassy of Sweden. The College operated from temporary premises at Finchley Synagogue for a number of years, under the leadership of Rabbi Dr Nahum Rabinovitch. Under the auspices of Rabbi Dr Jonathan Sacks and with the financial backing of Stanley Kalms, chairman of Dixons, the College relocated in 1984 to its current building, now known as Schaller House, in Hendon, north-west London, close to the hub of London's Jewish community.

=== London School of Jewish Studies ===
In 1998, the University of London announced that it would be terminating the "Associated Institute" status that the College and three other small institutions enjoyed. Jews' College was forced to seek an academic partner within the University in order to be able to continue its degree programmes. Without the freedom to determine its own curriculum and the financial security that came from student fee income, it became increasingly difficult for the College to survive in its previous form. Rabbinic training was also uneconomic as many students looked to the Torah centres of Israel and America for their education and the number of available rabbinic posts in the UK decreased.

In 2002, the School of Oriental and African Studies (SOAS) decided to terminate its relationship with LSJS, which threatened the organisation's status. A small team of young community leaders and educators, led by the late Marc Weinberg, presented the then Chair of Council, Howard Stanton, with a proposal to use the human and financial resources available to refocus the School's activities and to secure its future as a hub of academic study and lifelong learning, catering to a wide spectrum of the community.

Since then, under the leadership of Rabbi Dr. Raphael Zarum and Joanne Greenaway, LSJS has welcomed hundreds of students to a range of adult education courses and events. In addition to numerous community-focused offerings, more formal programs include the following degree programs: The M.A. degree in Jewish Education with Middlesex University; and the BA (Hons) in Jewish Education, also in partnership with Middlesex University.

== Alei Tzion ==
The London School of Jewish Studies houses the synagogue Alei Tzion. Services take place regularly. These include; Shacharit, Mincha and Maariv prayer. The complete Shabbat services include two children's services.

== Notable alumni ==
- Michael Adler (1868–1944), first Jewish military chaplain to serve in a Theatre of War (1915–1918)
- Rabbi Dr Raymond Apple AO (1935–2024), Senior Rabbi of the Great Synagogue (Sydney) (1972–2005)
- Levi Billig (1897–1936), Arabist and pioneer of Arabic language education in the Yishuv
- Francis Lyon Cohen (1862–1934), first Jewish military chaplain to the British Army (1892–1904)
- Barnett A. Elzas (1867–1936), rabbi and historian in America
- Benzion Halper (1884–1924), Hebraist, Arabist, professor at Dropsie College
- Cyril Harris (1936–2005), Chief Rabbi of the Union of Orthodox Synagogues in South Africa (1987–2004)
- Lord Jakobovits, Chief Rabbi of the United Hebrew Congregations of the Commonwealth (1967–1991)
- J. Leonard Levy (1865–1917), rabbi in America
- Jacob Mann (1888–1940), Polish-American historian
- Jonathan Sacks, Baron Sacks (1948–2020), Chief Rabbi of the United Hebrew Congregations of the Commonwealth (1991–2013)

== Principals ==
- Louis Loewe (1809–1888) served as the first principal (1855–1858)
- Barnett Abrahams (1831–1863) served as principal (1858–1865)
- Michael Friedlaender (1833–1910) served as principal (1865–1907)
- Adolf Buechler (1846–1939) served as principal (1907–1939)
- Isidore Epstein (1894–1962) served as principal (1945–1961)
- Hirsch Jacob Zimmels (1900–1975) served as principal (1964–1969)
- Nachum Rabinovitch (1928–2020) served as principal (1971–1983)
- Jonathan Sacks (1948–2020) served as principal (1984–1990)
- Irving Jacobs (1937–2020) served as principal (1990–1993)
- Daniel Sinclair
