= Immanuel Jakobovits, Baron Jakobovits =

British rabbi (1921–1999)

Rabbi The Right Honourable The Lord Jakobovits
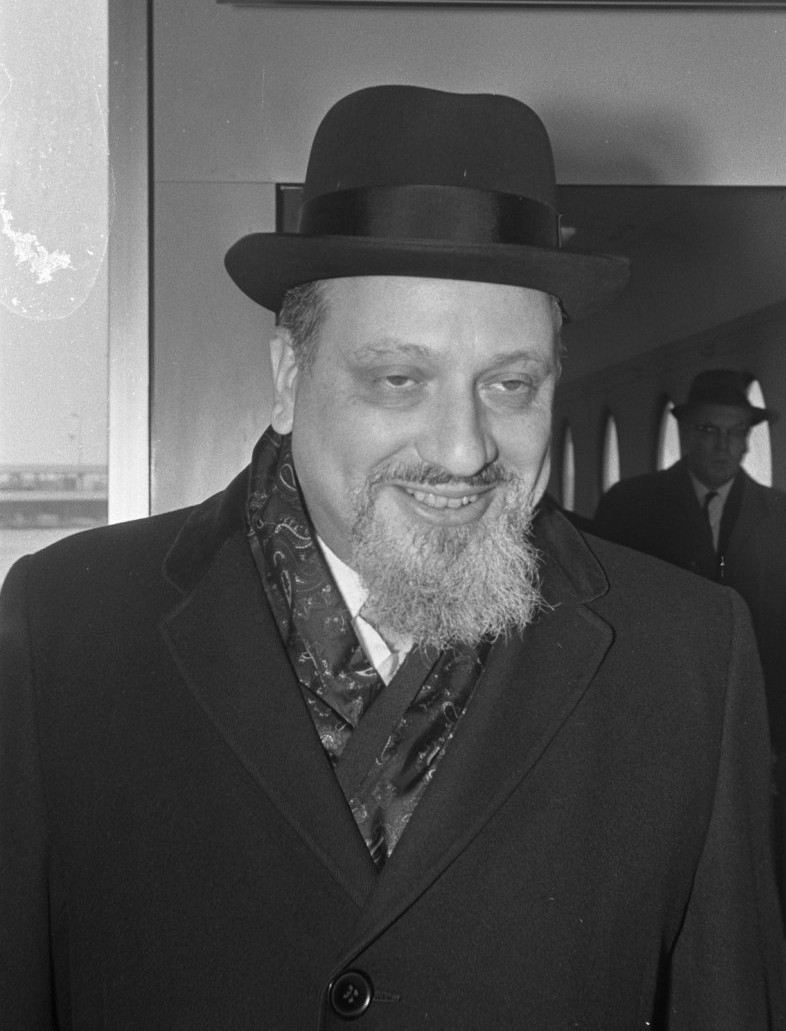
- Jakobovits in 1969
- Title: Chief Rabbi of the United Hebrew Congregations of the Commonwealth

Personal life
- Born: Immanuel Jakobovits; 8 February 1921 Königsberg, East Prussia, Germany
- Died: 31 October 1999 (aged 78) St John's Wood, London, England
- Buried: Mount of Olives, Jerusalem, State of Israel
- Spouse: Amélie Munk (married c. 1947)
- Children: 6
- Parent(s): Rabbi Julius Jakobovits & Paula Wrescher
- Occupation: Chief Rabbi

Religious life
- Religion: Judaism
- Denomination: Orthodox

Jewish leader
- Predecessor: Sir Israel Brodie
- Successor: Jonathan, Lord Sacks
- Position: Chief Rabbi
- Organisation: United Hebrew Congregations of the Commonwealth
- Began: 1966
- Ended: 1991
- Other: Chief Rabbi of Ireland
- Semikhah: Etz Chaim Yeshiva (London)

Immanuel Jakobovits, Baron Jakobovits (8 February 1921 – 31 October 1999) was the Chief Rabbi of the United Hebrew Congregations of the Commonwealth from 1967 to 1991. Prior to this, he had served as Chief Rabbi of Ireland and as rabbi of the Fifth Avenue Synagogue in New York City. In addition to his official duties he was regarded as an authority in medical ethics from a Jewish standpoint. He was knighted in 1981 and became the first Chief Rabbi to enter the House of Lords in 1988 as Baron Jakobovits.

== Biography ==
Jakobovits was born in Königsberg, East Prussia, Germany (now Kaliningrad, Russia), where his father Julius (Yoel) was a community rabbi. The family moved to Berlin in the 1920s, where his father became rabbinical judge on the beth din of the Grossgemeinde, but fled Germany in 1938 to escape Nazi persecutions. In the United Kingdom he completed his higher education, including a period at the Etz Chaim Yeshiva in London, studying under and receiving semicha (rabbi ordination) from the Rabbis Elya Lopian, Leib Gurwicz and Nachman Shlomo Greenspan. He also studied in Jews' College and the University of London (BA and PhD, University College).

He married Amélie Munk of Paris, the daughter of a prominent rabbi, who would support his community work throughout his life. The couple had six children. Lady Jakobovits died in May 2010, and was buried alongside her husband, on Jerusalem's Mount of Olives.

His first position was as rabbi of the Brondesbury synagogue. In 1949, at the relatively young age of 27, he was appointed Chief Rabbi of the declining Jewish community of Ireland. This was to be a stepping stone towards a greater rabbinical career, and in 1958 he assumed the rabbinate of Hermann Merkin's Fifth Avenue Synagogue in New York, a position he held until 1966, when he was called to the Chief Rabbinate of the United Hebrew Congregation of the British Commonwealth. He held this position until his retirement in 1991.

He was knighted in the 1981 Birthday Honours, with the knighthood conferred onon 22 July 1981, and was created a life peer on 5 February 1988, as Baron Jakobovits, of Regent's Park in Greater London, becoming the first rabbi to receive this honour. In 1987 he was given a Lambeth DD by the Archbishop of Canterbury, the first Jew to receive such a degree. In 1991 he received the Templeton Prize for Progress in Religion.

In the House of Lords he became known as a campaigner for traditional morality. Jakobovits aroused considerable controversy when, after the discovery of a possible genetic explanation for homosexuality, he suggested that he saw no "moral objection for using genetic engineering to limit this particular trend". While he did not advocate abortion, he did describe homosexuality as "a grave departure from the natural norm which we are charged to overcome like any other affliction"; if there were genetic explanations for homosexuality, "the errant gene" should be "removed or repaired" to prevent the "disability". In a speech in the House of Lords, Jakobovits made a speech saying that homophobia was an invented term that aimed to "uproot existing moral order."

Jakobovits died of a cerebral haemorrhage on 31 October 1999, and was buried on the Mount of Olives in Jerusalem.

== Other functions ==
Jakobovits was also the president of the Conference of European Rabbis, in which capacity he worked on standardising and regulating religious conversion to Judaism.

== Ideas and philosophy ==
Jakobovits was a firm adherent of the "German-Jewish" Torah im Derech Eretz philosophy, having a broad knowledge of religious subjects as well as secular culture and philosophy. This made him a unique spokesperson for Orthodox Judaism, as he was able to transmit ideas to a wide audience which would otherwise not have achieved dissemination.

Jakobovits was the most prominent figure in 20th century Jewish medical ethics, a field he virtually created on his own. He was also a pioneer in religious bioethics. His speciality was the interaction between medical ethics and halakha. Thanks to his academic training in Ireland, Rabbi Jakobovits approached his comprehensive volume, Jewish Medical Ethics, in light of Roman Catholic medical ethics, with which he often compares Jewish ethics. Whether developing or disputing his analysis, subsequent Jewish bioethicists have utilised his work on abortion, euthanasia, the history of Jewish medical ethics, palliative care, treatment of the sick, and professional duties. Likewise, he is credited with popularizing the viewpoint that Judaism supports the nearly absolute sanctity of life.

Jakobovits' political stance was conservative, and he was particularly close to Margaret Thatcher. When a Church of England report titled Faith in the City was published in December 1985 criticising Thatcher's policies, Jakobovits responded by attacking its underlying philosophy. Jakobovits argued that work rather than welfare should be the over-riding aim of government policy: "Cheap labour is better than a free dole". More controversially, he contended that inner-city black people should learn from Jewish experiences in America. There, he argued, Jews had worked themselves out of poverty, educated themselves, integrated into the host culture and nurtured a "trust in and respect for the police, realising that our security as a minority depended on law and order being maintained". Jakobovits also took a conservative view on trade unions, criticised Faith in the City for not mentioning the role of trade unions, arguing that "The selfishness of workers in attempting to secure better conditions at the cost of rising unemployment and immense public misery can be just as morally indefensible as the rapaciousness of the wealthy in exploiting the working class".

Within Judaism, Jakobovits held mildly Zionist views. He maintained that sooner or later Israel would need to negotiate the territory it conquered during the Six-Day War; which made him a controversial figure, as he mentioned these views publicly.

Jakobovits was also humble and accepting of rabbinic authority.

== Works ==
- Jewish Medical Ethics (1959/1975)
- Jewish Law Faces Modern Problems (1965)
- Journal of a Rabbi (1966)
- The Timely and The Timeless: Jews, Judaism and Society in a Storm-tossed Decade (1977)
- If Only My People: Zionism in My Life (1984)
- Dear Chief Rabbi: From the Correspondence of Chief Rabbi Immanuel Jakobovits on Matters of Jewish Law, Ethics and Contemporary Issues, 1980–1990 (1995)
- Lord Jakobovits in Conversation (2000)

== See also ==
- History of the Jews in Ireland

== Notes ==
Jewish titles
Preceded by Yitzhak HaLevi Herzog	Chief Rabbi of Ireland; 1949–1958	Succeeded by Isaac Cohen
Preceded by Sir Israel Brodie	Chief Rabbi of Great Britain and the Commonwealth; 1966–1991	Succeeded by Jonathan, Lord Sacks
