= Lapin =

Lapin (masculine) or Lapina (feminine) is a Russian patronymic surname Russian: Лапин. Notable people with the surname include:

== Lapin ==
- Aleksandr Lapin (general) (born 1964) Russian general
- Chay Lapin (born 1987), American water polo goalkeeper
- Daniel Lapin (born 1950), political commentator and American Orthodox rabbi
- David Lapin (born 1949), South African corporate advisor and rabbi
- Evgeny Lapin (born 1980), Russian ice hockey player
- Ivan Lapin (born 1988), Russian football player
- Gerri Lapin, pseudonym of Goldie Alexander (1936–2020), Australian author
- Lee Lapin (1948–2009), American author
- Leonhard Lapin (1947–2022), Estonian artist, architect and poet
- Nicole Lapin (born 1984), CNN anchor
- Nikita Lapin (born 1993), Russian footballer
- Raphael Lapin (born 1955), negotiation, mediation and communication expert
- Raymond Lapin (1919–1986), American politician
- Ron Lapin (1941–1995), American surgeon
- Sergey Lapin (police officer), Russian police officer
- Sergey Georgyevich Lapin (1912–1990), Soviet Union diplomat and politician

== Lapina ==
- Ginta Lapiņa (born 1989), Latvian model
- Marina Lapina (born 1981), Russian-born Azerbaijani hammer thrower
- Svetlana Lapina (born 1978), Russian high jumper

== See also ==
- Lapin, Argentina, a settlement in the province of Buenos Aires
- Mon Lapin quotidien, formerly Lapin, a French language comic published by L'Association
- Rabbit, or lapin in French, mammal in the family Leporidae
- Rabbit hair, or lapin, the fur of the common or Angora rabbit
- Suzuki Lapin, a Japanese car
