= David Lapin =

South African rabbi (born 1949)

David Lapin (born October 30, 1949) is a South African born rabbi. Since 2019, Lapin has held the position of rabbi of KBA synagogue, located in Raanana, Israel, and an international leadership and strategy consultant.

== Early life and education ==
Lapin's father is also a rabbi. Lapin studied under his great uncle Rabbi Eliyahu Lopian (1876–1970) (also known as Reb Elyah), a rabbi of the Mussar Movement. Lapin was a student of Rabbi Avrohom Gurwicz at Gateshead Yeshiva, Rabbi Mishkowski at Kefar Hassidim and Rabbi Haim Shmuelewitz at Mir Yeshiva in Jerusalem. He gained his smicha from Rabbi Isser Yehudah Unterman, the Chief Rabbi of Israel.

== Career ==
In 1989 Lapin founded the South African Institute of Business Ethics (SAIBE). In this capacity, Rabbi Lapin authored the Code of Ethics for Southern African Enterprises which was adopted by the first King Commission on Corporate Governance. SAIBE later developed into a consulting firm, Strategic Business Ethics Inc. now known as Lapin Consulting International Inc. of which Rabbi Lapin is the CEO.

In 1997 Lapin emigrated to the USA and in November 2012 was considered by The United Synagogue as a late entrant candidate in the selection process to succeed Rabbi Dr. Jonathan Sacks as Chief Rabbi of the United Kingdom, a role which was then given to Ephraim Mirvis.

In 2019 Lapin moved to Raanana, Israel, where he leads a community. He continues to consult globally. Lapin International is still headquartered in the United States, where most of its clients are located.

== Family ==
Rabbi Daniel Lapin is the older brother, and Rabbi Raphael Lapin is the younger brother, of David Lapin, their sister is Rebbetzin Judith Chill . Their father was the notable South African Rabbi Avraham Hyam Lapin (1912–1991) who was a nephew of Rabbi Elyah Lopian (1876–1970). Rabbi Lapin is married and has five children, four daughters and a son residing in the USA, Canada and Israel.

== Publications ==
Lead By Greatness: How Character Can Power Your Success (2012) ISBN 978-0-9834677-0-0
