= Suchard (disambiguation) =

Suchard is a surname. Notable people with the surname include:

- Lior Suchard (born 1981), Israeli mentalist, entrepreneur, entertainer, performer, and master of ceremonies
- Marc A. Suchard (born 1972), American statistician
- Rabbi Mordechai Suchard, founder of Gateways
- Philippe Suchard, Swiss chocolatier and founder of Chocolat Suchard
