= Casriel Dovid Kaplin =

British rabbi

Casriel Dovid Kaplin (1931–2006) was a rabbi and a dayan in the London Beth Din. He lived for much of his life in London, England. He published three volumes of his responsa as well as numerous scholarly articles, besides having many unpublished writings.

== Early years ==
Casriel Dovid Kaplin was born in the East End of London in 1931 (Chol Hamoed Sukkos 5632) to Jerusalem-born Noach Kaplin, a grandson of Reb Nochum Magid who formerly held lectures in the Hurva Synagogue in the Old City of Jerusalem. During World War II the family was evacuated to Letchworth because of their dwelling's proximity to the London Docks, a major target of German bombing. He became barmitzva while living at Letchworth; in later years he would bemoan the fact that he was not able to have his own personal tefillin at the ceremony. However, the pilpul (discourse) he delivered on the occasion of his barmitzva was heard by Rabbi Elya Lopian and Dayan Yehezkel Abramsky, two great Torah scholars who were living in Letchworth at the time.

== Rabbinate and scholarship ==
After World War II Kaplin studied at Gateshead Yeshiva. In 1952 he transferred to the Chevron Yeshiva for several years, after which he was accepted in Gateshead Kolel. He received semicha from Rabbi Isser Zalman Meltzer, Rabbi Zvi Pesach Frank the Chief Rabbi of Jerusalem, and Rabbi Shlomo Dovid Kahana.

In 1960 Kaplin married the eldest daughter of Aharon Zucker (of Stamford Hill). He continued his studies at Gateshead Kolel until 1965, when he was appointed as the rabbi of the Shomrei Hadath Synagogue, Hampstead, London. He had not been long in this position when he received a call to join the London Beth Din.

== London Beth Din ==
Casriel Kaplin's first appointment was as a rabbi with the Federation of Synagogues. The London Beth Din then offered him a better job and he transferred there in the late 1960s, in a position he was to hold for the next thirty years. This proved to be a turning point in Kaplin's career. He rapidly built up expertise in the areas of agunos and the correct spelling of names in gittin as well as in practical issues relating to mikvehs. As his reputation grew Kaplin began to receive rabbinical questions from all over the world, and is quoted in such classic responsa as Minchas Yitschok and Yabia Omer.

== Book theft scandal ==
In 1998, rare books from the collection of the London Beit Din began to appear for sale in private auctions. Kaplin was fired and repaid £200,000. No criminal charges were filed by Scotland Yard. Kaplin returned more than 300 volumes, but "it is still unclear how many remain at large".

== Final years ==
In retirement Kaplin moved to Jerusalem, Israel, where he was invited to serve as Rosh kollel of Rabbi Yitschok Myer Morgenstern's Yeshivas Toras Chochom. On a visit to his family in England for Pesach 2006, he fell ill with severe breathing problems. He did not recover and died in London on the 14 Iyar of that year.

== Works ==
Kaplin published three volumes of responsa:

- Keser Dovid
- Keser Dovid Tinyono
- Keser Nehora
- Keser Zohov was brought out in 2024 from his files
- Keser Dovid al HaTorah was brought out from his notes in 2023 It was Financed by Mr Jonathan Winegarten in memory of his parents
- A posthumous edition of novellae on tractate Mikva'ot was published in 2007 under the name Keser Dovid.
