= Tzvi Kushelevsky =

Talmudic scholar and teacher

Rabbi Tzvi Kushelevsky
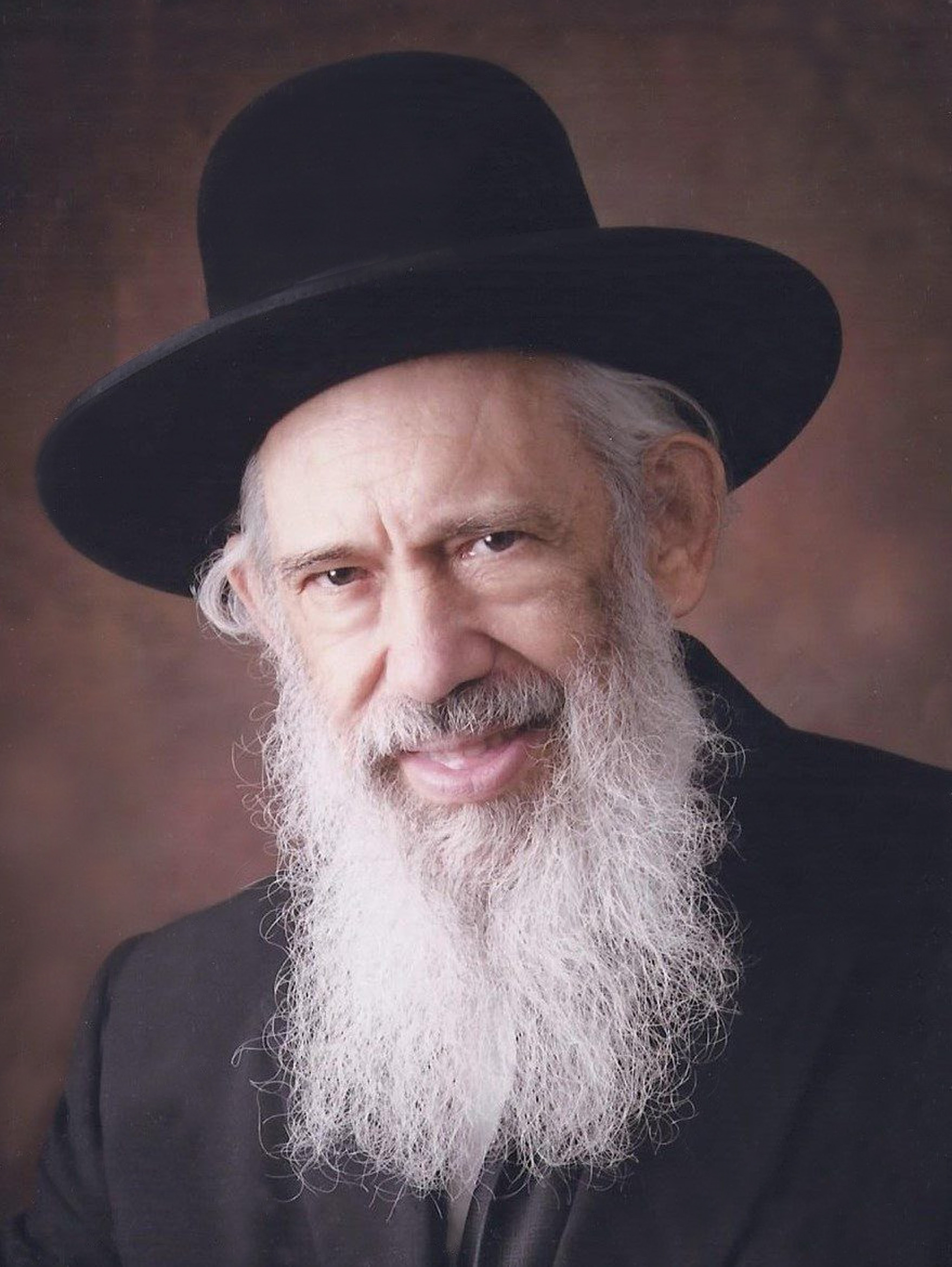
- Kushelevsky in 2024
- Title: Rosh Yeshiva, Heichal HaTorah BeZion

Personal life
- Born: March 3, 1936 (age 90) Israel
- Spouse: Sara Leah Kushelevsky (died 2015) Rachel Danieli (m. 2018)
- Children: 1
- Parent: Eliyahu Kushelevsky
- Education: Radin Yeshiva; Gateshead Yeshiva; Machon Harry Fischel

Religious life
- Religion: Judaism
- Denomination: Orthodox Judaism

Jewish leader
- Position: Rosh yeshiva
- Yeshiva: Yeshiva Heichal HaTorah BeZion, Jerusalem

Tzvi Kushelevsky (Hebrew: צבי קושלבסקי; born 3 March 1936) is an Israeli Orthodox rabbi and Talmudic scholar. He is the founder and the rosh yeshivah of Heichal HaTorah BeZion, a yeshiva in Jerusalem.

== Early life and education ==
Kushelevsky was born on 3 March 1936 to Eliyahu Kushelevsky, who was the Rabbi of the city of Be'er Sheva, then part of Mandatory Palestine. While still a child, his family moved to the United States.

Kushelevsky studied in the Radin Yeshiva in New York, founded by Rabbi Mendel Zaks; Gateshead Talmudical College in England; Hebron Yeshiva; and the Harry Fischel Institute for Talmudic Research.

His parents returned to Israel in 1953.

== Career ==
As a rabbi, Kushelevsky served for a period as a rosh kollel in Manchester. In 1971, he returned to Israel to serve as a rosh kollel in Be'er Sheva, the city of his birth, where he intended to found a yeshiva. He served for a period as rosh yeshiva of Yeshivas Itri, which he left with some of his students, moving to Yeshiva Torah Ore.

In the 1980s, Kushelevsky established his own yeshiva, Heichal HaTorah BeZion. Initially located on Yellin St. in Jerusalem, the yeshiva subsequently moved to the former Pressburg Yeshiva building in Givat Shaul, Jerusalem. Around 2000, the yeshiva again relocated to a new, purpose-built building in Har Nof, Jerusalem. The yeshiva, which is also widely known as "Reb Tzvi's", became for many decades a popular choice for young men from the US, UK and other English-speaking countries.

== Personal life ==
Rabbi Kushelevsky married his first cousin Sara Leah, the daughter of his uncle Rabbi Leib Gurwicz, the rosh yeshiva of Gateshead Talmudical College. He was thus both a brother-in-law and cousin to Rabbi Avrohom Gurwicz, head of the Gateshead Talmudical College yeshiva in Gateshead.

Sara Leah Kushelevsky died aged 77 in March 2015. Rabbi Tzvi and Sara Leah Kushelevsky did not have children.

Rabbi Kushelevsky married his second wife Rachel Danieli on 27 July 2018. She had 7 children from a previous marriage. Rachel Kushelevsky gave birth to Rabbi Kushelevsky's first child, Eliyahu, a boy, on 10 March 2024 in Jerusalem. She was aged 56 at the time of the baby's birth. Rabbi Kushelevsky was aged 88 years at the baby's birth.

== Works ==
- Simchas Tzvi on fundamental topics in Shas, compiled from his lectures by his student Rabbi Simcha Fordsham
- Yalkut Shiurim, a collection of lectures on Shas
- Sha'arei Bina, a work on the laws of Shabbat, Jerusalem 2012
- Toras Tzvi on various tractates of the Talmud. Volumes published on tractates Yevamot, Ketubot, Bava Kamma and Bava Metzia
- Sha'arei Tefilla, explanations and essays on Jewish prayer, with an essay on Jewish faith
- Toras Tzvi, essays and commentary on the Torah

== See also ==
- List of oldest fathers
- List of oldest mothers
