= Dov Yaffe =

Lithuanian-born Israeli rabbi

Rabbi Dov Yaffe דב יפה
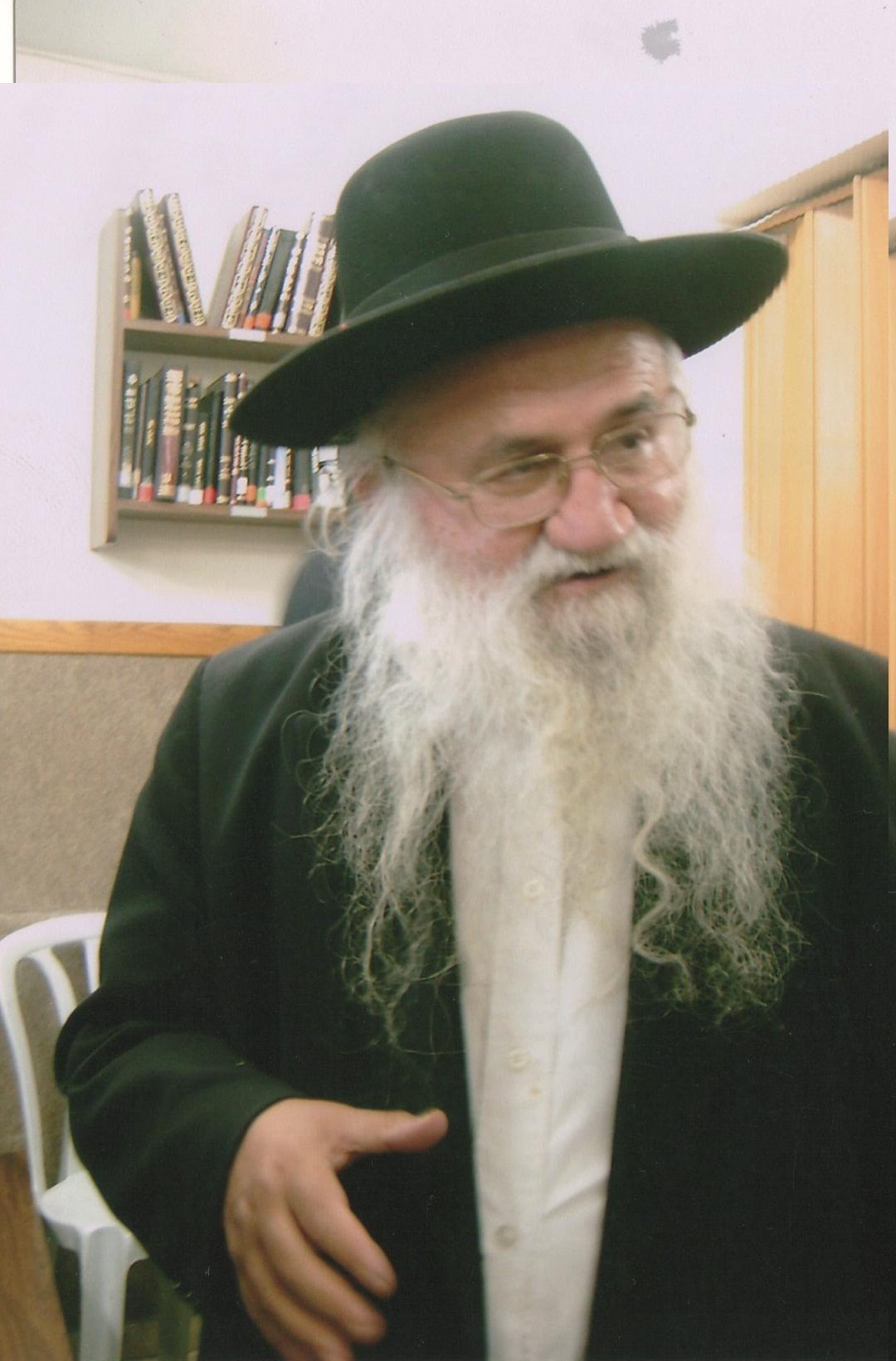

Personal life
- Born: June 1928 Vilna
- Died: November 8, 2017 (aged 89)
- Spouse: Rivka

Religious life
- Religion: Judaism
- Yahrtzeit: 19 Cheshvan, 5778

Dov Yaffe (Hebrew: דב יפה; 1928–2017) was a Polish-born Israeli rabbi, mashgiach, and leader of the Musar movement.

== Youth ==
He was born at Vilna in June 1928. In 1935, at age 7, he moved with his parents to the Land of Israel and settled in Tel Aviv where he studied at Yeshivas Hayishuv Hachadash and afterward at the Hebron, Ponevezh, and Slabodka yeshivos.

== Career ==
He became the assistant to Rabbi Elyah Lopian at the Knesses Chizkiyahu yeshiva which relocated to Rekhasim in Northern Israel in 1955. While based in Rekhasim, he taught Musar to thousands of students in Knesses Chizkiyahu, in Karmiel, and in Kol Yaakov in Jerusalem

== Family ==
He was married to Rivka and had six children.

== Final illness and death ==
Prior to his death, he was hospitalized at Laniado Hospital in Kiryat Sanz, Netanya. He died on November 8, 2017, at age 89.

== Works ==
His writings were published in Divrei Chachamim and other s'farim.
