= Harvey Belovski =

British Orthodox rabbi (born 1968)

Rabbi Harvey Belovski

Rabbi of Golders Green United Synagogue (Dunstan Road)
- In office 2003–2023

Chief Strategist and Rabbinic Head of University Jewish Chaplaincy

Personal details
- Born: 18 January 1968 (age 58) London, United Kingdom
- Education: University College, Oxford
- Occupation: Rabbi, educator, organisational advisor
- Known for: Shem MiShmuel: Selections on the Weekly Parashah and Festivals, The Shabbat Siddur Companion

Harvey Belovski (born 18 January 1968), is a British Orthodox rabbi. He was the rabbi of Golders Green United Synagogue (Dunstan Road) from 2003 to 2023 a position previously held by Chief Rabbi Lord Sacks. Belovski was a leading candidate for the Chief Rabbinate of the UK in the 2012 selection process which eventually appointed Rabbi Ephraim Mirvis.

== Background and education ==
Belovski grew up in north-west London and graduated in 1989 from University College, Oxford in Mathematics. He studied at the Gateshead Talmudical College, from where he received semicha (rabbinic ordination) in 1994 and subsequently at the Gateshead Beis Hatalmud Kollel. He received further semicha-ordinations from the Amsterdam Beth Din and Dayan Gershon Lopian, emeritus rabbi of Edgware Yeshurun Synagogue, whom he considers his primary teacher. He also holds a PhD in hermeneutics from the University of London.

Belovski has published two books – Shem MiShmuel: Selections on the Weekly Parashah and Festivals, and The Shabbat Siddur Companion, as well as an online version of his PhD dissertation –Harmonisation as Theological Hermeneutic and many articles in The Jewish Chronicle among other journals.

== Current advisory and teaching roles ==
- Principal and Governor of Rimon Jewish Primary School
- Chief Strategist and Rabbinic Head of University Jewish Chaplaincy
- Research and Teaching Fellow at the London School of Jewish Studies
- Rabbi of Kisharon
- Rosh (Rabbinic Head) of The Midrasha for Women
- Rabbinic Advisor of PaL (Phone and Learn)
- Faculty Member at the Montefiore College Semicha course
- Lecturer at the JLE (Jewish Learning Exchange)
- Member of the Rabbinical Council of the United Synagogue
- Member of the Advisory Council at the London School of Jewish Studies
- Member of the President’s Forum at Jewish Care
- Member of Advisory Group of Sex Matters, the British gender-critical advocacy group.
