= Yehuda Weissler =

Rabbi's work in Siberian Communities

Rabbi Yehuda Weissler
- Title: Chief Rabbi of Siberia

Personal life
- Born: 7 March 1969 (age 57) Manchester, England

Religious life
- Religion: Judaism

Rabbi Yehuda Weissler, born 1969 in Manchester U.K is a British Rabbi who served as Chief Rabbi of Siberia and Novosibirsk Oblast in the 1990s.

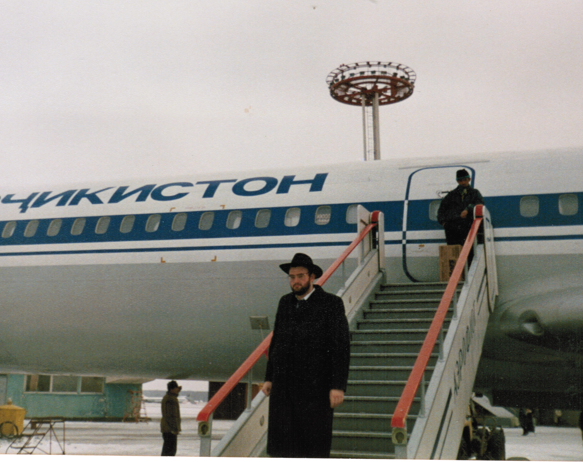
Rabbi Yehuda Weissler, winter 1993, upon his arrival in Siberia at the Novosibirsk Tolmachevo Airport.

Weissler together with his wife Mirelle and their son Shmuli moved to Novosibirsk, the capital city of Siberia in December 1993.

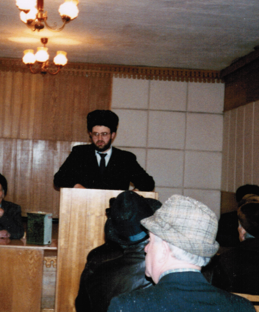
Rabbi Yehuda Weissler delivering his inaugural address in a Novosibirsk community center in January 1994.

According to the Jewish Telegraphic Agency (JTA), Chief Rabbi Weissler was involved in reestablishing Jewish communal life in Novosibirsk, including synagogue services and educational programs for Jewish youth.

Rabbi Weissler was also reported to have addressed the European Agudath Israel Convention in Bournemouth, UK in 1995 regarding the growth and welfare of Jewish communities in Siberia and the former Soviet Union.

== Biography ==
He studied Talmud and Jewish theology at the Manchester and Gateshead Yeshiva and later in Israel at the Ponevezh Yeshiva in Bnei Brak.
