= Golders Green =

Area of Barnet in London, England

Coordinates: 51.5736°N 0.1921°W

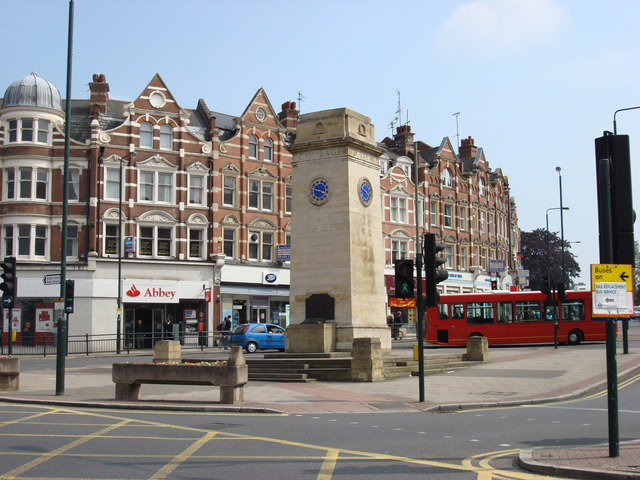
- Golders Green clock tower

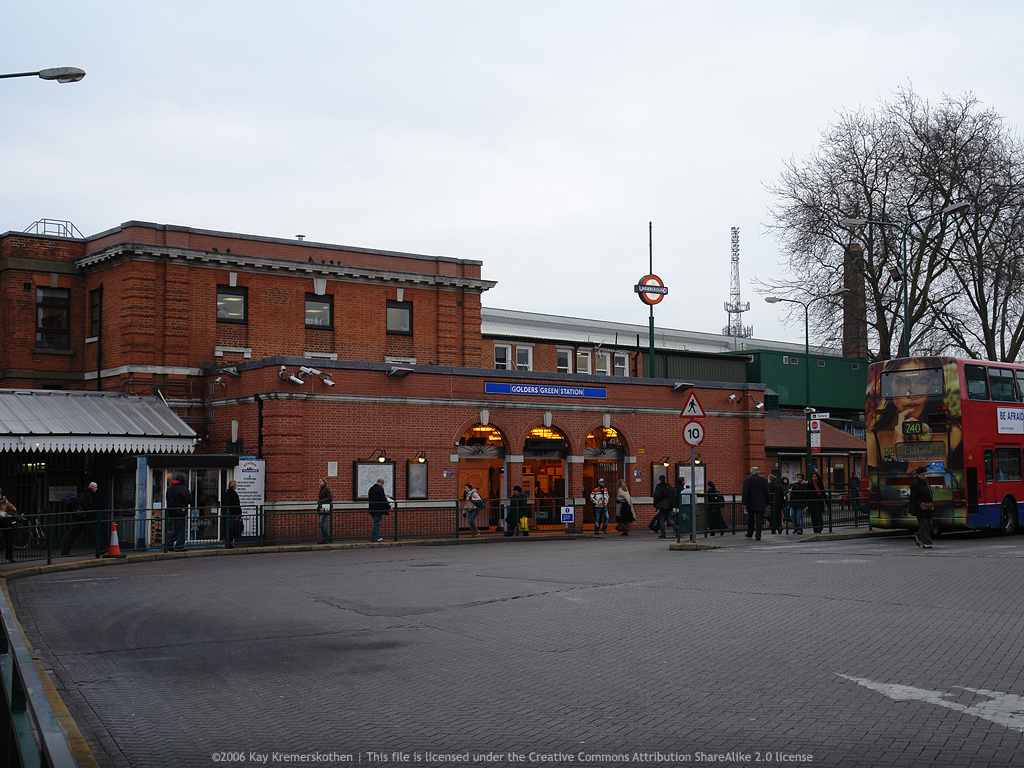
- Golders Green Underground station

- Location within Greater London
- Population: 18,818 (2011 Census.Ward)
- OS grid reference: TQ248876
- London borough: Barnet
- Ceremonial county: Greater London
- Region: London
- Country: England
- Sovereign state: United Kingdom
- Post town: LONDON
- Postcode district: NW11, NW2
- Dialling code: 020
- Police: Metropolitan
- Fire: London
- Ambulance: London
- UK Parliament: Finchley and Golders Green
- London Assembly: Barnet and Camden

Golders Green is a suburb in the London Borough of Barnet in north West London, 5.6 miles (9 km) northwest of Charing Cross. Its historical origins lie in a medieval small suburban linear settlement that was sited near a farm and public grazing area green. The bulk of Golders Green forms a late Victorian/early Edwardian suburb centered on a commercial crossroads, the rest being of a later build.

It was founded as a medieval hamlet in the large parish of Hendon, Middlesex. The parish was superseded by Hendon Urban District in 1894 and by the Municipal Borough of Hendon in 1932, abolished in 1965. In the early 20th century, it grew rapidly in response to the opening of a tube station of the London Underground, adjacent to the Golders Green Hippodrome, which was home to the BBC Concert Orchestra for many years. The area has a wide variety of housing and a busy main shopping street, Golders Green Road.

It is known for its large Jewish population, as well as for being home to the largest Jewish kosher hub (located west of Hoop Lane after the rail bridge) in the United Kingdom, which attracts many Jewish tourists.

== History ==
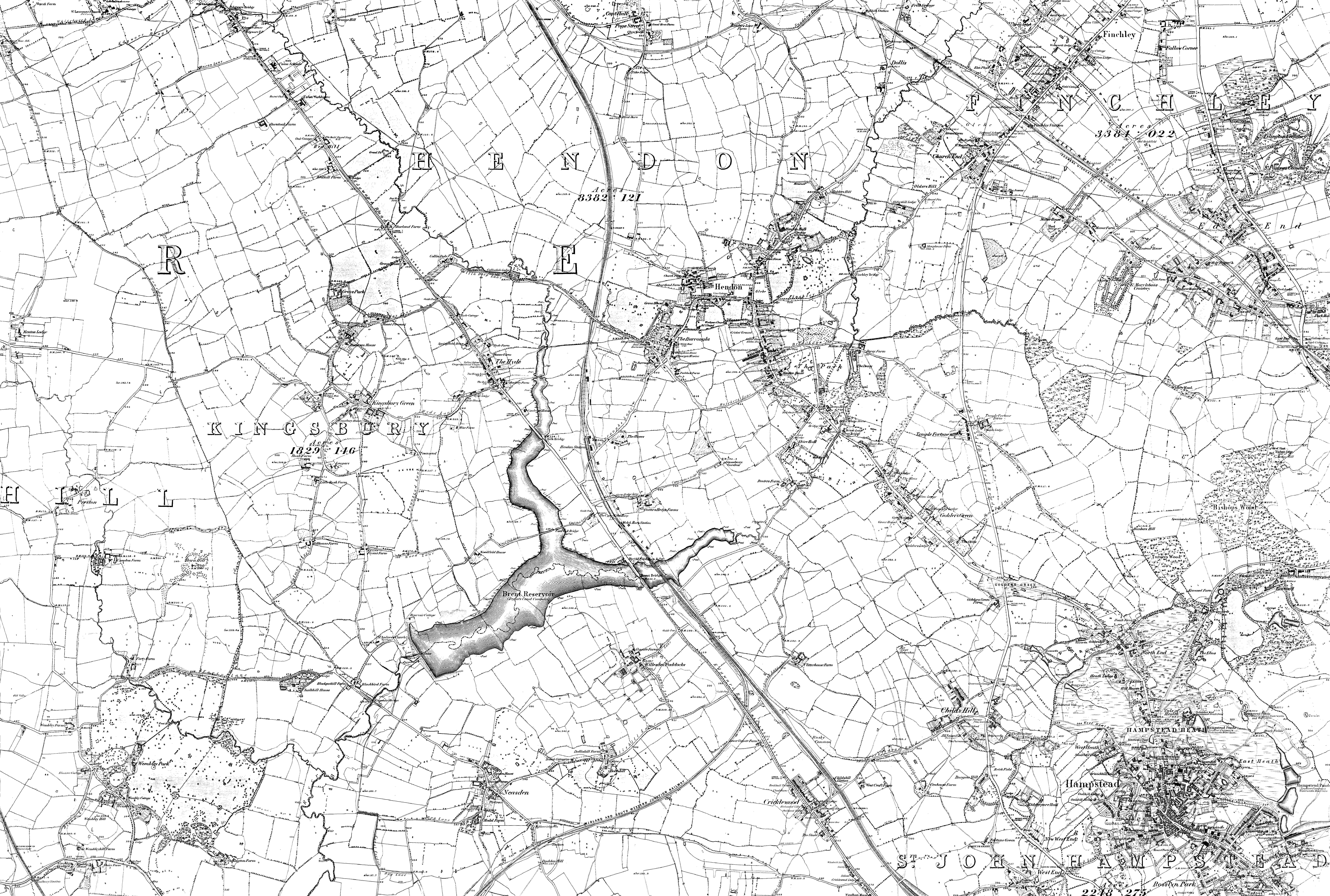
Extract of OS Map of 1868–1883. Click on map to view wider sheet.

The name Golders comes from a family named Godyere who lived in the area, and Green alludes to the manorial common at a cross roads next to which the settlement was built. Golders Green has been a place in the parish and manor of Hendon since around the 13th century. The earliest reference to the name of the adjacent district of "Temple Fortune" is on John Rocque's map of 1754, which also shows what is now Golders Green Road as Groles Green. However the name Temple Fortune reveals a much earlier history. It is likely that the name refers to the Knights of St John, who had land here (c. 1240). Fortune may be derived from a small settlement (tun) on the route from Hampstead to Hendon. Here a lane from Finchley, called Ducksetters Lane (c. 1475), intersected. It is likely that the settlement was originally the Bleccanham estate (c. 10th century). By the end of the 18th century Temple Fortune Farm was established on the northern side of Farm Close.

The building of Finchley Road (c. 1827) replaced Ducksetters Lane as a route to Finchley, and resulted in the development of a small hamlet. Hendon Park Row (c. 1860s) is of this period, and consisted of around thirty small dwellings built by a George Stevens, which were, with two exceptions, demolished around 1956. A small dame school and prayer house run by Anglican deaconesses existed in the 1890s and 1900s, and developed to become St. Barnabas (1915). Along Finchley Road were a number of villas (c. 1830s), joined by the Royal Oak public house (c. 1850s). By the end of the 19th century there were around 300 people living in the area, which included a laundry and a small hospital for children with skin diseases. The principal industry was brick making.

In 1895, Golders Green Jewish Cemetery was established adjacent to Hoop Lane, with the first burial in 1897. Golders Green Crematorium was opened in 1902 (although much of it was built after 1905). A significant moment in Temple Fortune's development into a suburban area occurred in 1907, when transport links were vastly improved by the opening of Golders Green Underground station.

Although the area had been served by horse-drawn omnibuses (since at least the 1880s) and later motor buses (from 1907), the tram line of 1910, connecting Finchley Church End with Golders Green Station, led to the development of the area west of Finchley Road. The establishment of Hampstead Garden Suburb brought major changes to the area east of Finchley Road. Temple Fortune Farm was demolished and along the front of the road the building of the Arcade and Gateway House (c. 1911) established the Hampstead Garden Suburb's retail district.

In 1913, the Golders Green Hippodrome, former home of the BBC Concert Orchestra, and the police station opened. The 3,000 seater, Orpheum Theatre (1930) was intended to rival the Hippodrome in Golders Green and it enjoyed a royal visit from Elizabeth II, in 1972, but closed its doors in 1974, and was completely demolished in May 1982.

In March 2026, four ambulances owned by Hatzalah, a Jewish volunteer service, were set on fire. A month later, two Jewish locals were stabbed in a separate incident, which was condemned by the prime minister, Keir Starmer. Both incidents were characterised as antisemitic by the Metropolitan Police. On 14 May 2026, King Charles III paid a visit to the community and met with both victims of the stabbings, together with the first responders to the incident. The King voiced his concerns about the rise of antisemitism in the area. The following month, a communal stairwell in a residentual apartment building on Bridge Lane, mainly inhabited by Jewish familied was set on fire. Residents confronted the suspect and extinguished the fire, preventing any damage or injuries. A suspect fled the scene.

== Geography ==
For local elections Golders Green ward covers the north and west of the area; Childs Hill the south to the centre and Garden Suburb, named after Hampstead Garden Suburb: most of the east. Councillors are elected from across 21 wards. Nationally it votes for the MP for seat of Finchley and Golders Green, which encompasses the parts of the NW11 and NW2 postcode districts it contains. The same boundaries are used for the Golders Green, Childs Hill and Garden Suburb wards of the Metropolitan Police Service.

It is about 160 feet (50 m) to 260 feet (80 m) above sea level.

The area is adjacent to the Heath Extensions part of Hampstead Heath.

== Demography ==
Golders Green is often referred to as a Jewish area, and 2021 Census data shows that 49.9% (7,358 of 14,744) of residents identified as Jewish, making it the epicentre of the largest Jewish population in Europe alongside surrounding areas, including Hampstead, Hendon and Finchley within the Borough of Barnet, which is home to 55,000 Jews, the highest percentage Jewish population in any Borough of the United Kingdom.

Ethnically, the Golders Green ward was 64% White (43% British, 21% Other, 1% Irish). Indians, Other Asians and Black Africans made up 5% each, while 6% claimed 'Any other ethnic group'.

=== Jewish community ===
There has been a prominent Jewish community in Golders Green since the early 20th century, following the building of the station at the end of the Hampstead railway. Golders Green United Synagogue was the first purpose-built synagogue in the suburb, with its foundation stone laid on 16 October 1921. The Jewish community grew substantially after Hitler's rise to power drove many German Jews to England, the first German Jewish immigrants to the area forming the Golders Green Beth Hamedrash. Soon after, Galician Jewish immigrants formed other synagogues. With it came the formation of Jewish schools such as Menorah Primary School before the onset of World War II.

There are close to fifty kosher restaurants and eateries under rabbinical supervision in Golders Green, and more than 40 synagogues throughout the area continuing into neighbouring Hendon, as well as 30 Jewish schools (some in outlying areas owing to space restriction), many of them independent.

== Economy ==
Golders Green has restaurants with many cuisines including Indian, Israeli, Thai, Turkish, Japanese, Chinese, Korean and Italian eateries. These are over a dozen coffee bars; together with a number of niche food stores. The area is home to several leading banks.

== Transport ==
Golders Green station is a London Underground tube station on the Northern line in London fare zone 3. It is the first surface station on the Edgware branch when heading north. On the station's forecourt is Golders Green bus station. This is a major hub for London Buses in North London. National Express coaches also stop at the bus station before/after central London.

Many bus routes pass through Golders Green, including the 210 to Finsbury Park, the 139 to Waterloo, the 13 to Victoria and the 102 to Edmonton Green, and from Golders Green station the 240 to Edgware, the 183 to Pinner, and both the 83 and the 245 to Alperton begin their routes.

== Education ==
There are six state aided primary schools in Golders Green; these include: Brookland Infant & Junior, Garden Suburb Infant & Junior, Menorah Primary School and Wessex Gardens.

The King Alfred School is located on North End Road and Henrietta Barnett School is located in nearby Hampstead Garden Suburb.

== Places of worship ==
=== Churches ===
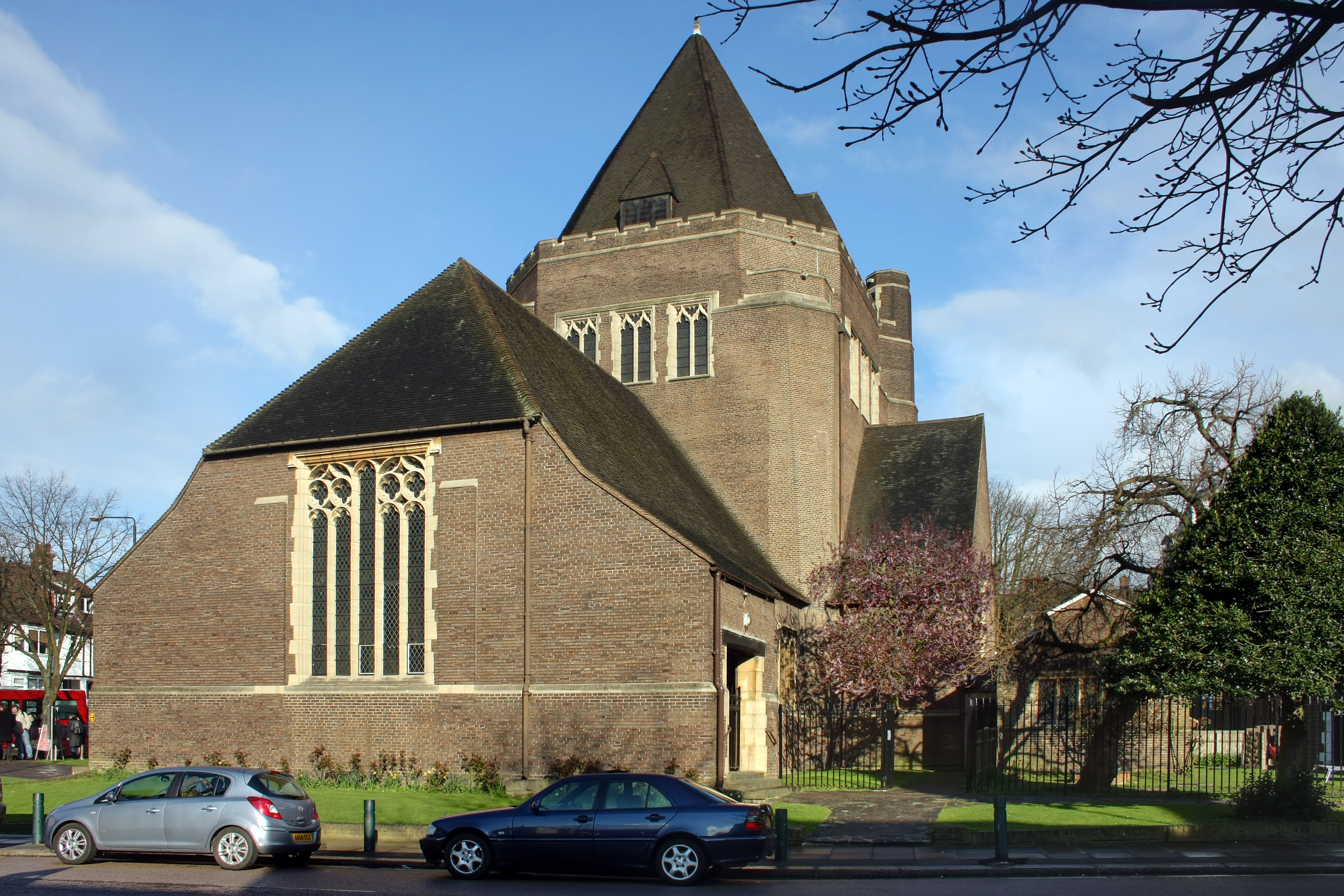
Golders Green Parish Church (Church of England)

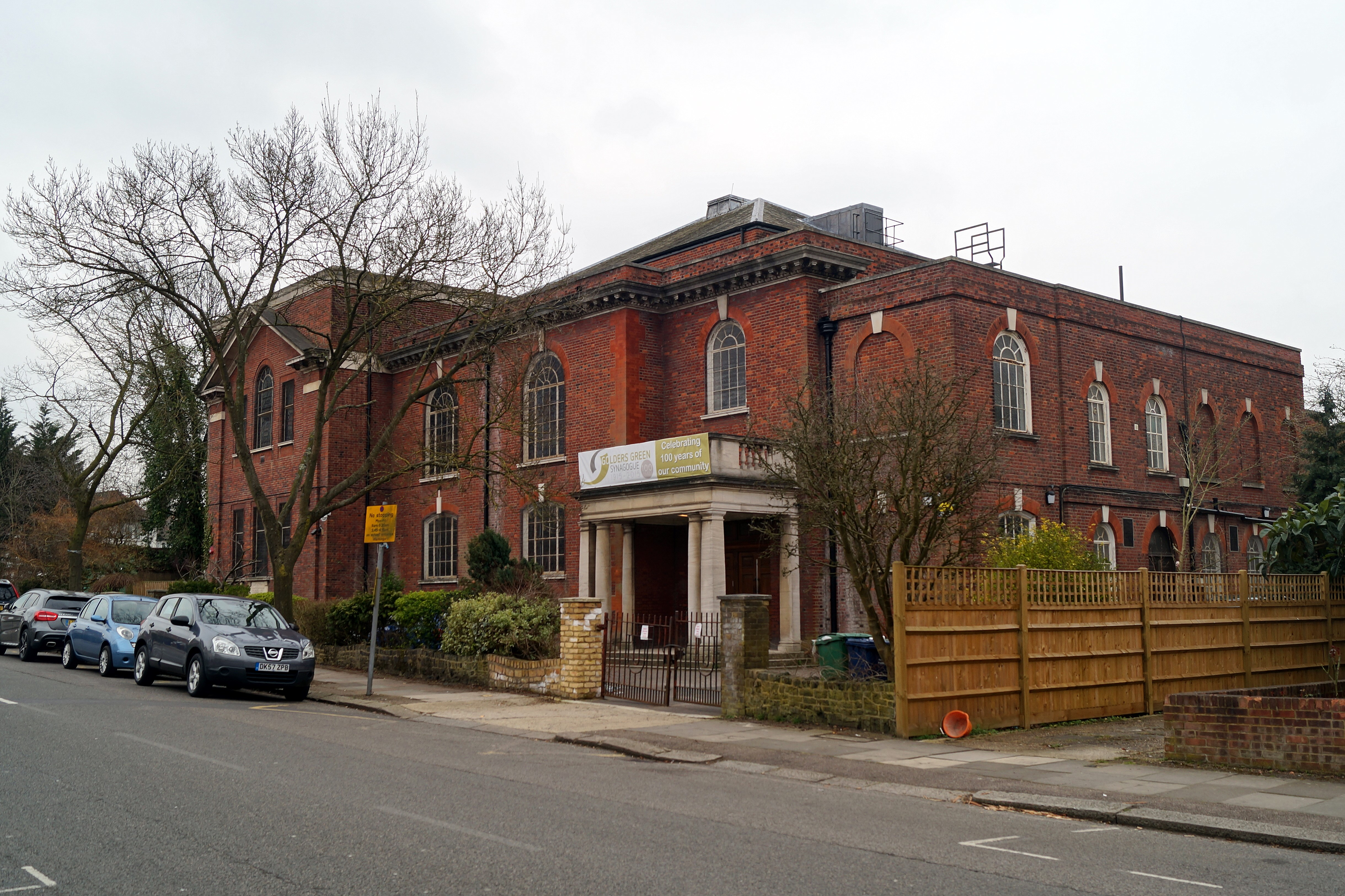
Golders Green Synagogue

The Anglican parish church of St. Alban the Martyr in North End Road was designed by Sir Giles Gilbert Scott, and in 1933 replaced the original eponymous church, on the site, which is now the parish hall. The latter was built in 1910 and made a parish church in 1922.

St Edward the Confessor, a Roman Catholic church, was built in 1915 and consecrated in 1931. A Carmelite monastery was established in Bridge Lane in 1908 and sold in 2007.

There is a Greek Orthodox cathedral on Golders Green Road, and a Coptic Orthodox church, both having been Anglican churches for most of the 20th century. The Greek Orthodox church was built in 1914.

The Golders Green Unitarian Church, built in 1925 on Hoop Lane, is Grade II listed; Historic England singles out for mention a "notable temera mural by Ivon Hitchens", among other works. The congregation seceded from Rosslyn Hill Unitarian Chapel (Hampstead) in 1903 but took a generation to build its own place of worship. St Ninian's Presbyterian Church on Helenslea Avenue was built in 1911 by T. P. Figgis, noted for designing stations on the Northern line. The congregation merged with Golders Green Methodist Church (now Trinity Church, Hodford Road) in 1979. The building found new life as a Hindu temple, but was decommissioned in 2013.

=== Synagogues ===
There are several synagogues in the area. The first, Golders Green United Synagogue (Dunstan Road), started in 1915 and its current building in Dunstan Road opened in 1922. The Golders Green Beth Hamedrash opened in Golders Green in 1934, moving to the Riding in 1956. The Sassover Beis Hamedrash Helenslea Avenue moved to Golders Green from the East End in 1939 as well as the Beis Yissochor Dov (Hager's) currently in Highfield Avenue.

The Beth Shmuel Synagogue in 1942 in Oakfields Road and relocated at 169–171 Golders Green Road in 1945 and is a prominent synagogue in North West London, with Rabbi Elchonon Halpern its longest serving Rabbi for 72 years up until his death in 2015. In about 1960 the Eastern Jewish Community established the Ohel David Eastern Synagogue at the Lincoln Institute, the former site of the Golders Green Beth Hamedrash. The Machzike Hadath Synagogue moved to Golders Green in the 1970s, opening its present building in 1983.

=== Other religious buildings ===
The former Golders Green Hippodrome theatre became an El Shaddai International Christian Centre in 2007 and then an Islamic centre in 2017, and now is a Hillsong Church.

== Community facilities ==
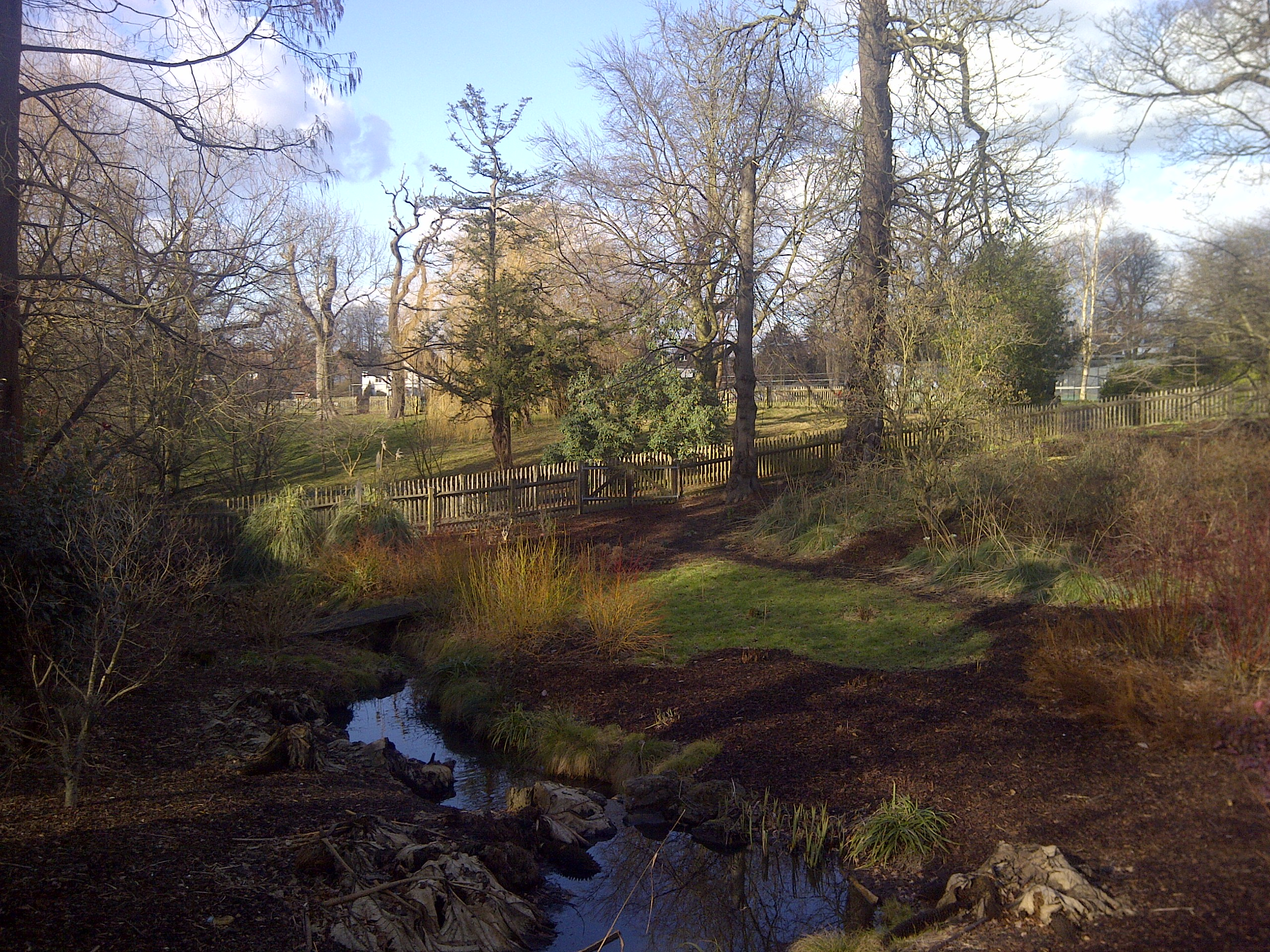
Water Garden in Golders Hill Park

Golders Hill Park, adjoining the West Heath of Hampstead Heath, is a formal park, which includes a small (free) zoo, a walled horticultural garden, pinetum, duckponds, a water garden and a very popular café. During the summer, children's activities are organised and there is often live music on the bandstand. Close to the park, also adjoining the West Heath is the Hill, a formal garden with an extensive and imposing pergola.

Nearby Golders Green Crematorium has an extensive garden with features such as a special children's section and a pond, in keeping with the distinct Italianate air.

== Appearances in popular culture ==
In his 1946 book "The Great Divorce", C.S. Lewis has a character from Golders Green. Sarah Smith and her husband are the last characters to enter the novel. She appears with great pomp and circumstance, arrayed in splendor and arriving behind a procession complete with music. She is beautiful and one of the "great ones" in heaven, but on earth had led an anonymous life in Golders Green.

== Places of interest ==
- Golders Green Hippodrome
- Ivy House on North End Road, former home of the renowned Russian ballerina Anna Pavlova
- Golders Green War Memorial
- Golders Hill Park
- Golders Green tube station

== Notable people ==
- Dannie Abse, Welsh poet and doctor, lived in Golders Green.
- Michael Allmand VC (1923–1944), recipient of the Victoria Cross, was born in Golders Green.
- Ian Black, journalist and author.
- Alex Clare, singer-songwriter, lives in Golders Green.
- Peter Frankl, lives in Gresham Gardens, Golders Green.
- Lillian Hall-Davis (1898-1933), silent-era actress, lived in Golders Green for the last few years of her life.
- Elchanan Halpern, a Rabbi in Golders Green.
- Samuel Greenstein, middle distance athlete, lives in Golders Green.
- Kazuo Ishiguro, novelist, lives in Golders Green.
- Anthony Joshua, British professional boxer, lived in Golders Green with his mother.
- Ghada Karmi, author, lived in Golders Green with her family after leaving Israel in 1948.
- Lina Khan, American legal scholar serving as chairwoman of the Federal Trade Commission, grew up in Golders Green.
- Ernest Krausz (1931–2018), Romanian-Israeli professor of sociology and President at Bar Ilan University, lived there.
- Sydney Kyte (1896–1981), bandleader, lived in Golders Green from the 1930s to the 1960s.
- Michael McIntyre grew up in Golders Green.
- Mary Macarthur, women's rights campaigner, lived there.
- Marilyn Malin, publisher, editor and literary agent, was born and grew up in Golders Green.
- Louis Marks, television screenwriter and producer, was born there.
- Nicolas Medtner, composer and concert pianist, lived at 69 Wentworth Road, 1935-51.
- Kathleen Simon, Viscountess Simon, abolitionist, lived and died in Golders Green.
- Osi Umenyiora, former New York Giants defensive end, was born in Golders Green.
- Evelyn Waugh, novelist, author of Brideshead Revisited, lived in nearby North End, Hampstead.
