= Daniel Lapin =

American rabbi

- Born: January 1, 1947 (age 79); Johannesburg, South Africa
- Citizenship: U.S. naturalized citizen (1973)
- Occupations: American Orthodox rabbi Author; Radio Show Host
- Organization(s): American Alliance of Jews and Christians, Toward Tradition
- Website: http://www.rabbidaniellapin.com

Daniel Lapin (born January 1, 1947) is an American rabbi of Orthodox Judaism, author, and public speaker. He was previously the founding rabbi of the Pacific Jewish Center in Venice, California, and the former head of Toward Tradition, the Commonwealth Loan Company and the Cascadia Business Institute. Lapin currently hosts a daily television program with his wife, Susan, and provides spiritual advice to people through his website.

== Early life and education ==
Lapin was born on January 1, 1947, in Johannesburg, South Africa, to a family of Lithuanian Jewish descent; the son of Rabbi A.H. (Avraham Hyam) Lapin, a rabbinical leader in South Africa and great-nephew of Rabbi Elya Lopian. He is the eldest of four siblings.

Before coming to the United States, he studied in yeshivas in Gateshead and Jerusalem. Lapin has rabbinic ordination from three institutions: Gateshead Yeshiva (1969); Yeshiva Knesset Hezekiah in Israel (1972); and from Rabbi Jacob Ruderman in Baltimore, Maryland (1975).

While in his early twenties, he returned to South Africa and taught physics and Bible at Yeshiva College of South Africa. He initially planned to move to Israel but moved to New York and later California. He partnered with Matis Weinberg and started a yeshiva for high school and post-high school students in Santa Clara, California, in 1976.

His family re-located to Washington State in 1991 to develop Toward Tradition and host a nationally syndicated weekly radio show.

Lapin has two brothers, David and Raphael, who are also Orthodox rabbis and have similar educational backgrounds. His sister is married to an American rabbi. Lapin's wife and business partner, Susan Lapin, is also an author and lecturer.

== Professional career ==
=== Pacific Jewish Center ===
From 1976 until 1991 Lapin was the rabbi of the Pacific Jewish Center in Venice, California.

=== Broadcasting and television ===
In 1995, Lapin began to broadcast a weekly radio talk show on KVI in Seattle. The show ended in 2006 when he began hosting a Sunday afternoon radio show on KSFO in San Francisco. Lapin has also been a frequent guest of Dave Ramsey on The Dave Ramsey Show on radio and television and on the Glenn Beck Program on Fox News Channel and TheBlaze.

=== Lifecodex Publishing Company ===
Lapin is the founder of the Lifecodex Publishing Company.

== Publications and lectures ==
=== Books ===
Lapin has written many books, most of them self-published by LifeCodex publishing, most of which are available only as audio books.

- America's Real War Multnomah Books, division of Random House, 2012

== Awards and recognition ==
Lapin has received endorsements from Dave Ramsey, Dr. Kenneth L. Hutcherson, Dr. James Dobson, Dr. Pat Robertson, and Zig Ziglar. In 1998, he was recognized by Seattle Magazine as one of the "Four Faces of Faith" and featured in an article that included three other religious leaders.

In 2007, he was named by Newsweek as one of the top 50 rabbis in America.

== Jack Abramoff ==
Lapin has been linked to Jack Abramoff through his organization Toward Tradition. From the early 1990s until 2004, Abramoff was a board member of the organization, which required its board members to contribute at least $10,000 per year to the organization, and served a few terms as chairman of the board. Abramoff met his contribution one year by donating $10,000 from the Capital Athletic Foundation, an organization Abramoff controlled. E-mails later surfaced that were alleged to have been sent between Lapin and Abramoff. In these e-mails, Abramoff requests that Lapin create fake awards for Talmudic studies to help Abramoff gain admittance to the Cosmos Club in Washington, D. C. Lapin later released a formal statement confirming that no awards were ever issued to Abramoff, and stated that he was joking in the e-mails and believed that Abramoff was as well.

== Family ==
Lapin told the interviewer that he "is the oldest child" brother of Rabbi David Lapin and Rabbi Raphael Lapin; their sister is Rebbetzin Judith Chill. Their father was the notable South African Rabbi Avraham Hyam Lapin (1912–1991), who was a nephew of Rabbi Elyah Lopian (1876–1970). Lapin married Susan Friedberg on 15 May 1979. They have six daughters and one son.
