= Knesses Chizkiyahu =

Yeshiva in Rekhasim, Israel

Coordinates: 32°44′52″N 35°05′57″E

Yeshivas Knesses Chizkiyahu
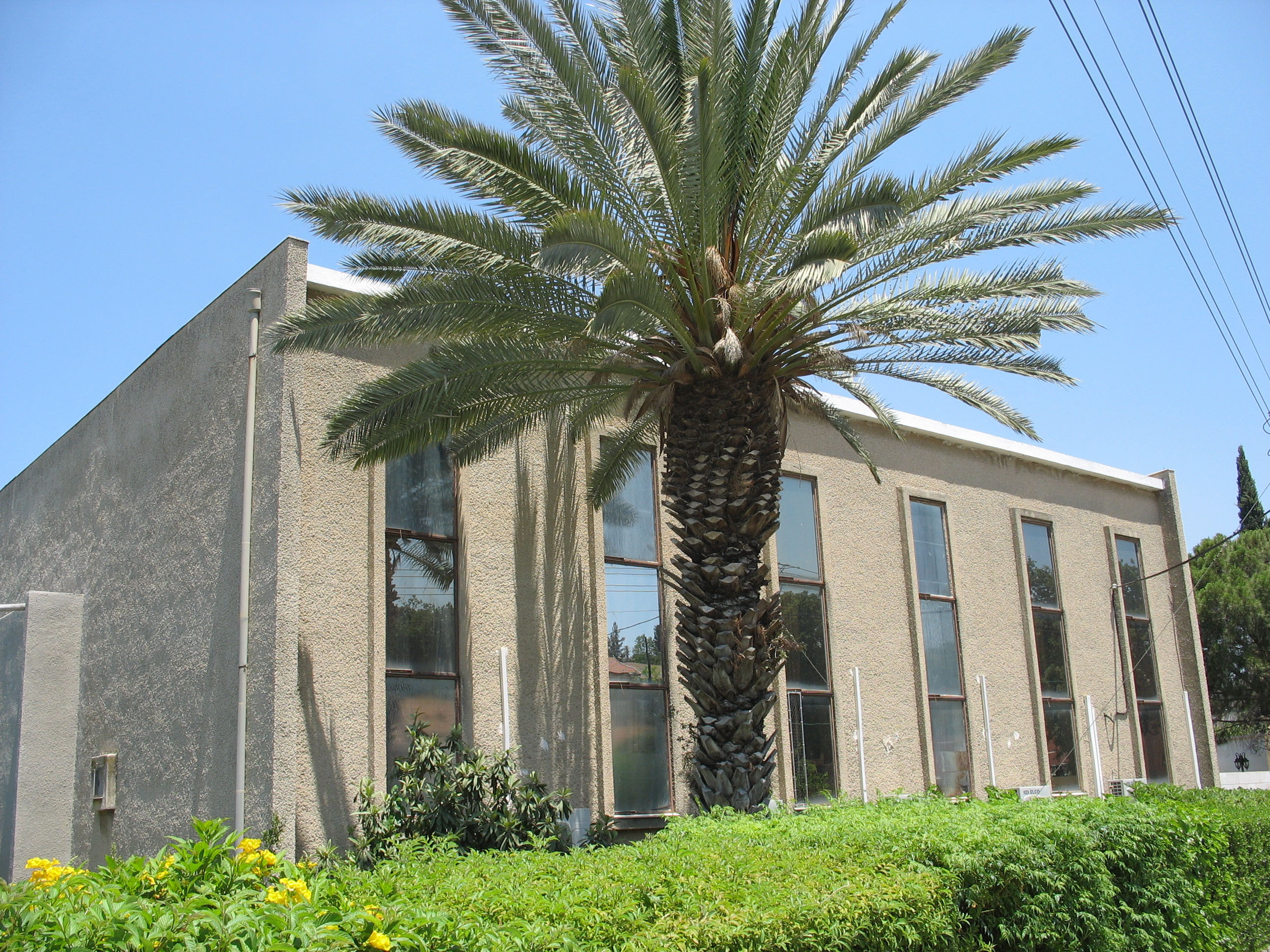
- Rekhasim; Israel

Information
- Established: 1955; 71 years ago
- Founder: Rabbi Noah Shimonowitz
- Affiliation: Haredi Judaism
- Rosh yeshiva: Rabbi Yehoshua Mann
- Mashgiach ruchani: Rabbi Dov Yaffe

Knesses Chizkiyahu was one of the first Litvak yeshivas founded after the establishment of the State of Israel and one of the first Torah institutions in the northern part of the country. Founded in Zikhron Ya'akov in 1949, it relocated to Kfar Hasidim, adjacent to Rekhasim, in 1955, where it operates today with nearly 200 students and a kollel.

== Early history ==
Knesses Chizkiyahu was founded by Rabbi Noah Shimonowitz, one of the greatest students of Rabbi Boruch Ber Leibowitz, who decided to open a yeshiva after surviving the Holocaust. He visited the Chazon Ish for his blessing and advice, and was told to seek a suitable location in the north of Israel, which at the time did not host any Torah institutions. Together with his brother-in-law, Rabbi Dovid Mishkovsky, Rabbi Shimonowitz established the yeshiva in the central synagogue of Zikhron Ya'akov and named it after Mishkovsky's father, Rabbi Chizkiyahu Yosef Mishkovsky, former Rav of Krinik, Poland. The initial enrollment of three students expanded to thirty students by the end of the first year.

In 1952, Rabbi Elyah Lopian, the contemporary leader of the Mussar movement, joined the staff as Mashgiach Ruchani, together with his son-in-law, Rabbi Kalman Pinsky. Lopian's influence on the yeshiva was so pronounced that it continues to this day. As an example of one tradition which he instituted, any yeshiva student who fills a cup to wash his hands must refill it for the next user in line.

== Move to Kfar Hasidim ==
The yeshiva experienced much difficulty in its early years, as students lacked sleeping facilities and organized meals due to the country's difficult economic situation. The location of the yeshiva in the central synagogue also caused friction between the students and local residents coming to pray. The yeshiva administration decided to find a new building, and then to leave Zikhron Ya'akov altogether.

When the news spread that the yeshiva was seeking a new home, many Orthodox Jewish communities extended a hand of welcome, but none were located in the north where the Chazon Ish had desired a yeshiva to be founded. Finally, a group of activists from the northern village of Kfar Hasidim petitioned the yeshiva and were accepted.

With the blessing of the Chazon Ish, the yeshiva purchased a 10 dunams (0.010 km^{2}; 0.0039 sq mi) lot on the outskirts of the village and five buildings containing a beth midrash, dining hall, dormitories and offices. The yeshiva moved into its new home at the end of April 1955.

Five days after the move, the Rosh Yeshiva, Rabbi Shimonowitz, died of a stroke. Rabbi Lopian took charge and appointed Shimonowitz's brother-in-law, Rabbi Raphael Eliyahu Eliezer Mishkovsky, who was also the Rav of Kfar Hasidim, as the new rosh yeshiva.

Mishkovsky worked together with Lopian to shape and guide the yeshiva and its students. In May 1964, they laid the cornerstone for a new building to house the many students who had outgrown the original site. This building is still in use today.

== Faculty ==
Mishkovsky led the yeshiva until his death in 1981. He was succeeded as rosh yeshiva by his son-in-law, Rabbi Dovid Yitzchak Mann (1945–2012), who was succeeded upon his death by his eldest son, Rabbi Yehoshua Mann. The mashgiach ruchani, Rabbi Elyah Lopian, died in 1970; he was succeeded by his protégé, Rabbi Dov Yaffe, who served until his death in November 2017.

== Rosh yeshivas ==
- Rabbi Noah Shimonowitz (1949–1955)
- Rabbi Raphael Eliyahu Eliezer Mishkovsky (1955–1981)
- Rabbi Dovid Yitzchak Mann (1981–2012)
- Rabbi Yehoshua Mann (2012- )

== Notable alumni ==
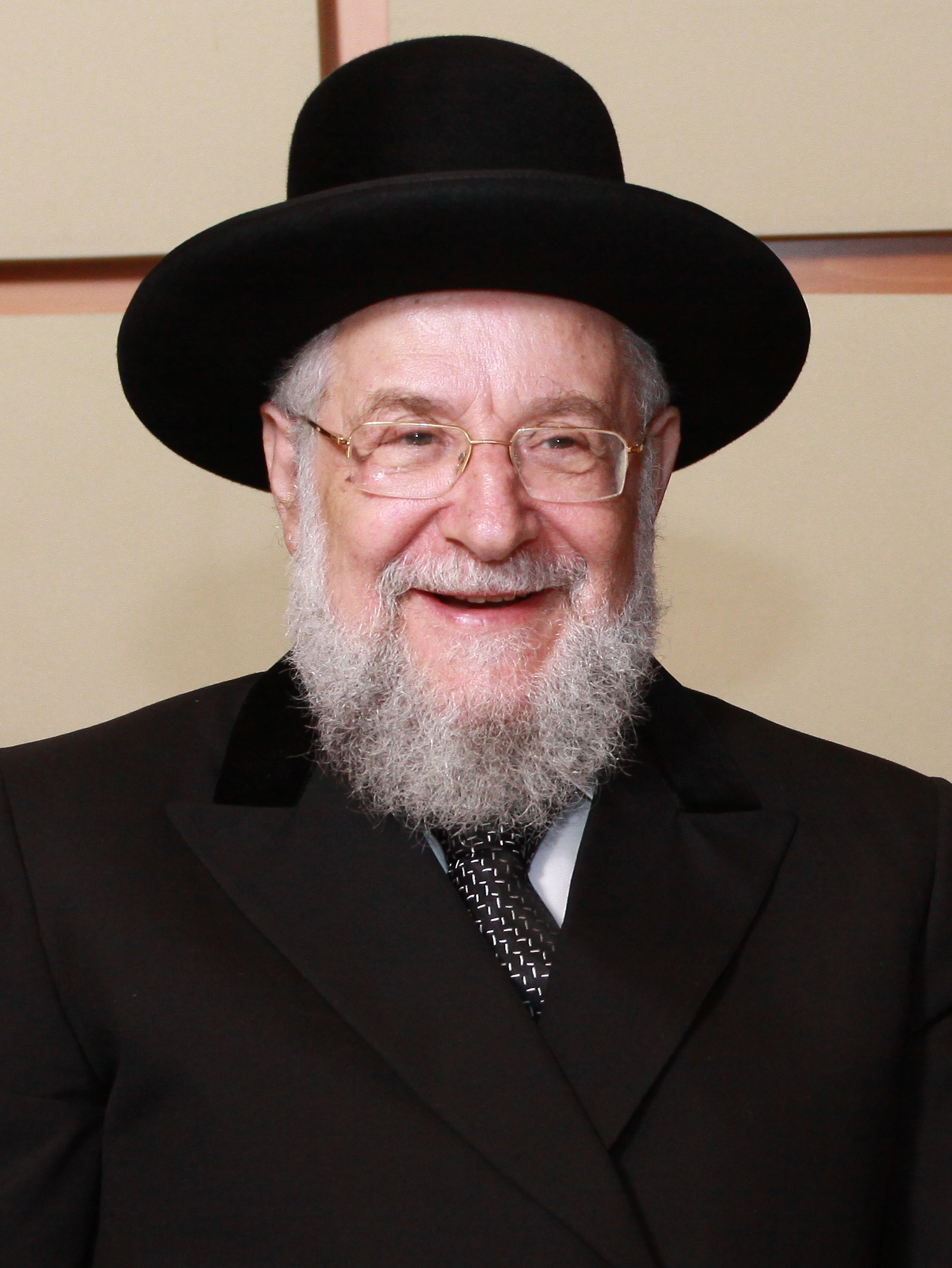
Rabbi Israel Meir Lau

- Rabbi Israel Meir Lau, Ashkenazi Chief Rabbi of Israel
- Dayan Gershon Lopian, Rabbi and Jewish Judge in London, England
- Rabbi Aryeh Birnhack, Rebbi at the Hasten Talmud Torah of Indianapolis
- Rabbi David Lopian, Rosh Hayeshivah of Mikdash Melech in Brooklyn, NY
- Duvi Honnig, Director of Parnasah Finder and the Parnasah Expo in NY, NY
- Rabbi Moshe Stav, Ram at Yeshivat Kerem B'Yavneh
- Rabbi Daniel Lapin
