= Berel Berkovits =

Rabbi who served London's Federation of Synagogues

Dayan Avrohom Dov (Berel) Berkovits (Hebrew: אברהם דב (ברל) ברקוביץ; 3 June 1949 – 15 April 2005), known as Berel Berkovits, was a Rabbi and Dayan who served on the beit din of London's Federation of Synagogues. His knowledge of secular law allowed him to extend how he carried out his religious communal service. This covered a range of "contemporary social issues" but most particularly in the area of family law. It was in completing one such attempt on an international level that his years ended.

== Berkovits amendment ==
Berkovits used his dual skills in Jewish and secular law to draft an amendment to Great Britain's 1996 Family Law Act which gave judges discretion to refuse a decree to a divorcing Jewish couple until any issues of Jewish law are cleared up. "He liked to call this the Berkovits amendment."

== Education ==
His secondary religious studies were at Gateshead Talmudical College. and also Mir of Jerusalem.

== Family ==
His father, Rabbi Moshe Dovid Berkovits, was a rabbi in Oradea (Yiddish: גרויסווארדיין Groysvardeyn) in Romania and subsequently in London. In his youth Dayan Berkovits was close with his maternal grandfather, Rabbi Yosef Adler, and later on was involved with the publication of that grandfather's rabbinical works.

Berkovits was approaching age 56 when he predeceased his mother. Other survivors include siblings, his wife, and four sons.
