= Muizenberg Shul =

Modern Orthodox synagogue in Cape Town, South Africa

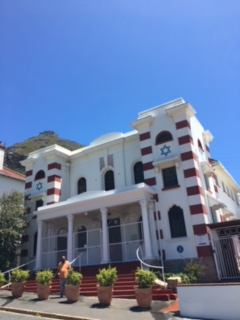
- Muizenberg Shul, in 2024

- Location of the synagogue in Greater Cape Town

Religion
- Affiliation: Modern Orthodox Judaism
- Rite: Nusach Ashkenaz
- Ecclesiastical or organizational status: Synagogue
- Ownership: Muizenberg Hebrew Congregation
- Leadership: Rabbi Ryan Newman
- Status: Active

Location
- Location: Camp Road, Muizenberg, Cape Town, Western Cape
- Country: South Africa
- Interactive map of Muizenberg Shul
- Coordinates: 34°06′24″S 18°28′02″E

Architecture
- Architects: Herbert Black; George Fagg
- Type: Synagogue architecture
- Style: Neoclassical
- Established: 1924 (as a congregation)
- Groundbreaking: 14 February 1924
- Completed: 1925

Website
- muizenbergshul.co.za

The Muizenberg Shul, formally the Muizenberg Hebrew Congregation, is a Modern Orthodox Jewish congregation and synagogue, located in Muizenberg, in Greater Cape Town, in the Western Cape region of South Africa. The congregation was established in 1924, and the synagogue was completed in the following year.

== History ==
The foundation stone was laid on 14 February 1924 by Rev. A. P. Bender, who led the Gardens Shul. Construction was completed at the end of 1925 and the synagogue officially opened in 1926. It was built to serve both the growing Jewish resident population and the high volume of Jewish holidaymakers. 600 Jewish families from Eastern Europe settled in the town in the 1920s. Rabbi Lionel Mirvis served the community as did his son, Rabbi Ephraim Mirvis (currently Chief Rabbi of the United Hebrew Congregations of the Commonwealth), who led high holy days services at the shul. In a blue plaque unveiling ceremony attended by former Premier of the Western Cape, Helen Zille, the synagogue was honoured for its historical significance in 2021.

Since 2020, the congregation has been led by full-time rabbi, Ryan Newman. According to Newman: “Muizenberg may be the largest Jewish community in South Africa during the holidays. We have a minyan of over fifty men every single day. You can’t walk a minute on the beach without seeing a group of people you know sitting together. The amazing thing is that you see Jews here from across the spectrum of Orthodoxy. You have people – and often very different rabbis – from Chabad, Mizrachi, Ohr Somayach, etc. all joining together in a single shul.”

South Africa's Chief Rabbi, Warren Goldstein and his counterpart in the UK, Rabbi Ephraim Mirvis, attended centenary celebrations for the congregation in January 2024.

== See also ==
- History of the Jews in South Africa
- List of synagogues in South Africa
