= Raphael Lapin =

American lawyer

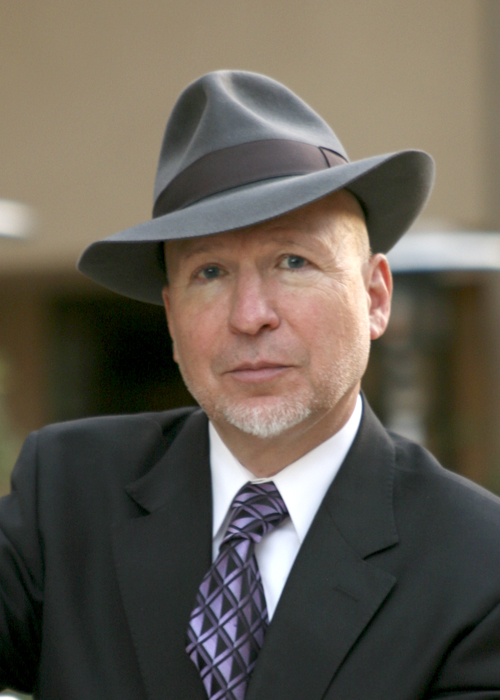
- Education: Masters Degree, Talmudic Law; Specialty Certificates, Negotiation, Mediation; Rabbinic Ordination
- Alma mater: Gateshead Institute of Talmudic Law; Harvard Law School
- Known for: Negotiation Expert, Professor of Law
- Notable work: Book - Working With Difficult People

Raphael Lapin is a negotiation specialist and author currently residing in California. He is the founder of Lapin Negotiation Strategies and serves as a consultant to Fortune 500 companies and governments internationally. He is a negotiation expert and was a syndicated columnist for American City Business Journals and a regular contributor to Research Magazine. He was also an adjunct professor at Whittier Law School and faculty at Southwestern Law School.

== Career ==
Lapin began his practice in family law mediation after moving to San Jose, California in 1992 after his father died. He took over as the rabbi of Congregation Am Echad, the synagogue where his father was rabbi. He received his training in negotiation and mediation from Harvard Law School's program on negotiation. He trained under Professor Roger Fisher, director of the program.

Lapin is also the founder of Lapin Negotiation Strategies, an international corporate negotiation, mediation and conflict resolution consultancy that began in 1995. His company's services have been retained by many companies including British Telecom, Nothrup Grumman, Yahoo, and Turner Construction. He was also contracted by the Qatar government in 2009 to teach business leaders and ministry officials in modern negotiating techniques.

== Family ==
Rabbi Daniel Lapin and Rabbi David Lapin are the older brothers of Raphael Lapin, their sister is Rebbetzin Judith Chill . Their father was the notable South African Rabbi Avraham Hyam Lapin (1912–1991) who was a nephew of Rabbi Elyah Lopian (1876–1970).

Raphael Lapin has 9 kids: Aryeh Lapin, Devorah Lapin, Moshe Dov Lapin, Zevi Lapin, Tova Lapin, Esther Lapin, Avigail Lapin, Mickey Lapin, and Eli Lapin, respectively.

== Published works ==
=== Books ===
- 2009, Working With Difficult People, DK Publishing

=== Articles ===
- 2010, Advisor of Confidant, AdvisorOne
- 2008, Cuban Missile Crisis Standoff Has Business Lessons, San Jose Bizjournal
- 2007, Three Steps Help Prepare For Negotiation, San Jose Bizjournal

== See also ==
- Negotiation
