= Leib Gurwicz =

British rabbi

Rabbi Leib Gurwicz
- Title: Gateshead Rosh Yeshiva

Personal life
- Born: Aryeh Ze'ev Kushelevsky; 1906 Molėtai, Russian Empire
- Died: 20 October 1982 (aged 75–76) London, England
- Spouse: Liba Lopian; Molly Isbee
- Children: Yitzchak Dovid; Avrohom; Sarah Leah (Toki); Chaim Ozer
- Education: Mir yeshiva (Poland)

Religious life
- Religion: Judaism

Jewish leader
- Predecessor: Rabbi Nachman Dovid Landinski
- Successor: Rabbi Avrohom Gurwicz
- Position: Rosh yeshiva
- Yeshiva: Gateshead Talmudical College

Aryeh Ze'ev (Leib) Gurwicz (1906–20 October 1982) was an influential Orthodox rabbi and Talmudic scholar. He was the son-in-law of Rabbi Elyah Lopian and best known as Rosh Yeshiva of the Gateshead Yeshiva in Gateshead, England, where he taught for over 30 years.

He studied at various yeshivas in Lithuania and Poland before moving to England to get married in 1932.

== Early life and education ==
He was born Aryeh Ze'ev Kushelevsky in the small town of Molėtai, Russian Empire (now Lithuania), where his father, Rabbi Moshe Aharon Kushelevsky served as rabbi. His mother was a direct descendant of the Vilna Gaon. His brother was Rabbi Eliyahu Kushelevsky (1910–1992), who later served as av beis din (head of the rabbinical court) of Beersheba.

At the age of thirteen he left home to learn in yeshiva. He sneaked across the border into Lithuania and went to learn at the Vilkomir yeshiva ketana, where he proved himself to be a diligent and capable student. After a year and a half in Vilkomir, he traveled to Vilna in the hopes of seeing his family, who had moved there, however his father had been called back to Malat. In the meantime, Vilna was the new home of the Mir yeshiva, which had relocated deep in Russian territory during World War I. Gurwicz decided to join the Mir yeshiva in Vilna, becoming one of its youngest students.

After studying for a few years at the Mir yeshiva, he was forced to change his Polish passport. Due to political tensions between Lithuania and Poland, Polish nationals were liable to be expelled from the country. The nearest passport office was in Baranovich, where a student of the Baranovich Yeshiva arranged the forgeries. Forced to choose a new surname, he selected his mother's maiden name, Gurwicz, which he kept for the rest of his life. He stayed on in the Baranovich Yeshiva and paid off his debt to the student who had forged his passport by agreeing to learn the Ketzos HaChoshen with him for a year.

Altogether, Gurwicz learned in the Mir for eight years, after which he traveled to study under Rabbi Yitzchok Zev Soloveitchik (known as "the Brisker Rav"). The Brisker Rav valued his student highly and said of him: "Reb Leib knows how to learn".

== Marriage and move to England ==
In 1932 Rabbi Elyah Lopian, then head of the Eitz Chaim yeshiva in London, came to Poland — then the Torah center of the world — with his eldest daughter, Liba, in the hopes of finding a suitable marriage partner for her. Rabbi Lopian's friend, Rabbi Yerucham Levovitz, recommended that he go to the Brisker Rav and ask for "Leibeleh Malater". Father and daughter were favorably impressed with the young genius, and when the marriage terms were written up, it was agreed that Liba would leave London and live in Poland, where Rabbi Gurwicz would continue learning.

During the engagement period, however, Lopian's wife, Sarah Leah, died at the age of 49 in England, leaving 13 orphans. Liba, the eldest girl, wrote to her fiancé saying that she could not leave her father with the burden of caring for all the children on his own, and that if Leib wished to break the shidduch, she would understand. Unsure of how to proceed, Rabbi Gurwicz traveled to the elder sage of the generation, the Chofetz Chaim, who was then 94 years old and in poor health. Instead of giving a direct response to Gurwicz's question about whether to proceed with the shidduch, the Chofetz Chaim kept repeating a series of verses from the morning prayers, including "Blessed is He Who redeems and rescues". Gurwicz understood this as a message that he should go ahead and marry Liba Lopian and move to England.

His bride insisted that they use the presents and money they received for their wedding to pay for a ticket for his father to join them at the wedding in England; it was the first time father and son had met since Gurwicz had left home at age 13. A few years after Rabbi Kushelevsky returned to Poland, he was murdered by the Nazis. As a resident of England, Gurwicz was able to help his sister, brothers-in-law, and several friends obtain visas to leave Nazi-occupied Poland in 1940 by acting as their sponsor.

The Gurwiczes had three sons and a daughter: Avrohom, who succeeded his father as rosh yeshiva; Yitzchak Dovid, a consulting engineer; Chaim Ozer, a lecturer at Gateshead Yeshiva; and Sarah, who married her cousin (Leib Gurwicz's nephew) Rabbi Tzvi Kushelevsky, head of the Heichal HaTorah BeTzion Yeshiva in Jerusalem.

== London ==
Upon arriving in London, Gurwicz gave a shiur at his father-in-law's Etz Chaim Yeshiva; one of his students was Rabbi Immanuel Jakobovits, who received semicha from him. He also served as the Rav of the Great Garden Street Synagogue in the East End.

== Gateshead ==
In 1948 Gurwicz's brother-in-law, Rabbi Leib Lopian, who studied in the Gateshead Kollel headed by Rabbi Eliyahu Eliezer Dessler, wrote to him in London suggesting that he join the staff of the budding Gateshead yeshiva. This yeshiva had grown to 120 students from the influx of refugees following World War II, and now included immigrant students whose learning skills were much greater than those of boys from the East End, since the former had studied in Europe's leading yeshivas. Rabbi Gurwicz was accepted to the staff and began teaching the highest shiur (class). Under his leadership, the number of students increased many times over, and Gateshead became Europe's primary Torah center. He also served as the chairman of the World Agudath Israel.

In 1977 his first wife died of a heart attack. He was married to his second wife, Malka (Mollie) Isbee, for nearly four years, until his death in 1982.

== Death and succession ==
Gurwicz suffered a stroke on 20 October 1982 and died later that day. The funeral was held on Thursday, 21 October.

He was succeeded as rosh yeshiva by his son, Avrohom Gurwicz.

== Works ==
- Rashei Shearim (Hebrew: ראשי שערים, literally, "Gateshead") (1971) — a compilation of the main lectures which he delivered in the yeshiva.
- Arza Devei Rav (Hebrew: ארזא דבי רב, "Pillar of the Beth Midrash") (1979) — Talmudic discourses containing hundreds of original Torah thoughts (chiddushim). The first word of the title is based on his name, אריה זאב (Aryeh Ze'ev).
- Meorei Sheorim (Hebrew: מאורי שערים, "Illuminating Gates"), a collection of his mussar and hashkafa (Jewish philosophy) talks, was published posthumously by his students.
