= Avrohom Gurwicz =

British rabbi

Rabbi Avrohom Gurwicz
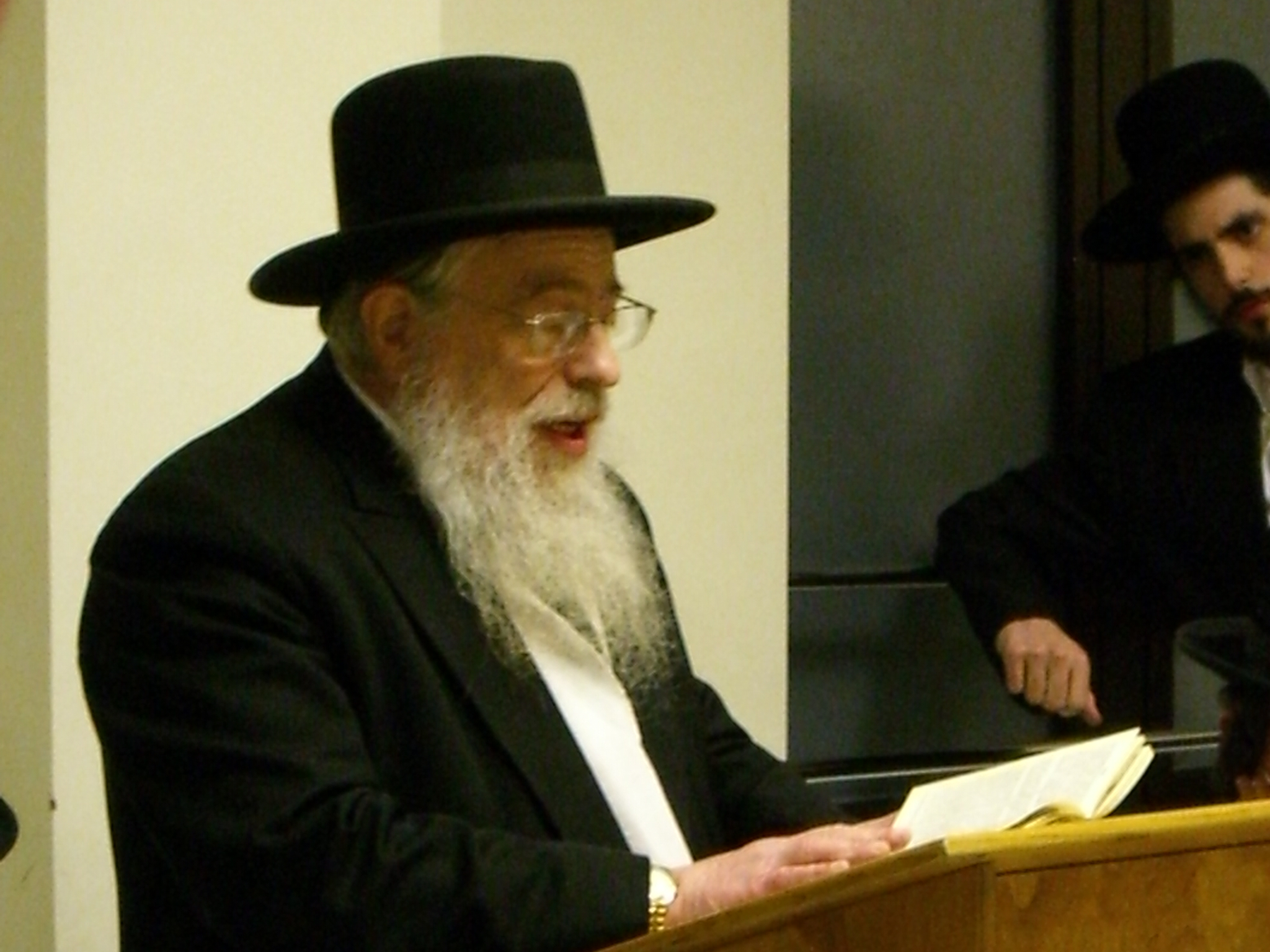
- Gurwicz speaking in 2008
- Title: Gateshead Rosh Yeshiva

Personal life
- Born: London, England
- Parent: Leib Gurwicz (father)
- Education: Gateshead Talmudical College

Religious life
- Religion: Judaism
- Denomination: Orthodox

Jewish leader
- Predecessor: Leib Gurwicz
- Yeshiva: Gateshead Talmudical College
- Position: Rosh yeshiva
- Began: October 1982

Avrohom Gurwicz is a British Orthodox rabbi and Talmudic scholar. Since 1982 he has been the rosh yeshiva of Gateshead Talmudical College.

== Biography ==
Gurwicz was born in London, England, the second son of Rabbi Leib Gurwicz, the rosh yeshivah of Gateshead Talmudical College. He is the grandson of Rabbi Elyah Lopian and son-in-law of Lopian's son, Rabbi Leib Lopian. Through his father's mother, he is a descendant of the Vilna Gaon. Gurwicz is a brother-in-law (through his sister Sarah) and cousin to Rabbi Tzvi Kushelevsky, head of the Heichal Hatorah beTzion yeshiva in Jerusalem. Among his sons-in-law is Rabbi Nissan Kaplan, the rosh yeshiva of Daas Ahron and former maggid shiur in the Mir yeshiva in Jerusalem.

In the mid-1950s, he spent several years as a student at Yeshivas Brisk in Jerusalem, where he developed a relationship with the Brisker Rav. His marriage to his first cousin, the daughter of Leib and Tzipa Lopian, was finalised after a Goral HaGra performed by their mutual grandfather, Elya Lopian. In his early years, he also studied in Gateshead Kolel.

In 1963, he became a maggid shiur at the Gateshead Talmudical College. Following the death of both his father, Leib Gurwicz, and his father-in-law, Leib Lopian, he ascended to the position of rosh yeshiva. He delivers a daily Gemara shiur in Yiddish, beginning each one with a mussar lesson from Chovos Halevavos.

In February 2025, Gurwicz announced that the Haredi community should leave the United Kingdom should the Children's Wellbeing and Schools Bill be passed. In March 2025, he supported voting in the World Zionist Congress elections for the Eretz Hakodesh party.

== Works ==
- Anfei Erez, five volumes on the Talmud.
- Ve'anafeha Arzei El on the Torah and Jewish holidays
- Leket Hearos, notes from the shiurim he has given.
