= Pacific Jewish Center =

Orthodox synagogue in Venice, Los Angeles, California

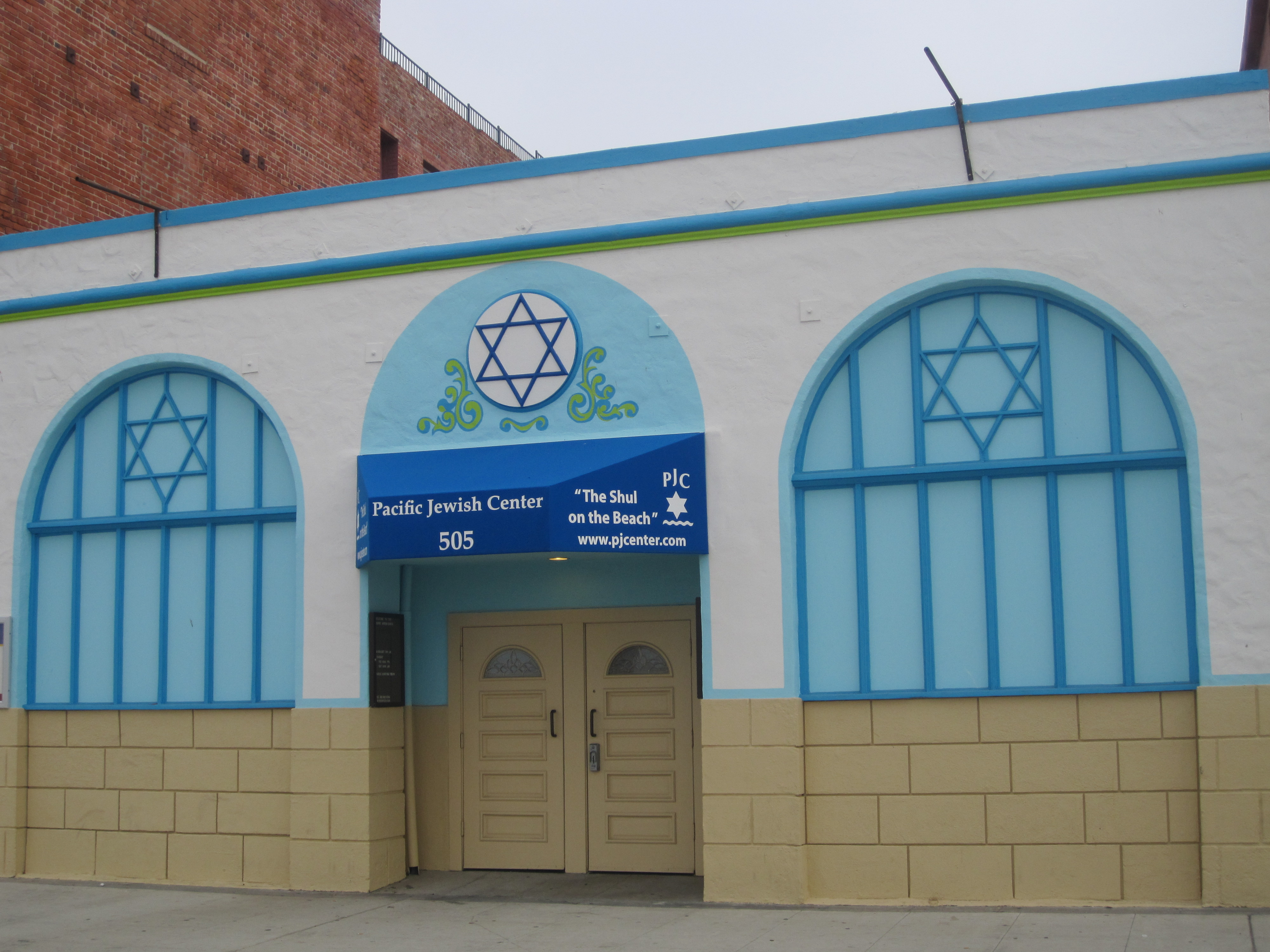
- The synagogue on the Venice Boardwalk, 2009

- Location in western Los Angeles

Religion
- Affiliation: Orthodox Judaism
- Ecclesiastical or organisational status: Synagogue
- Leadership: Rabbi Shalom Rubanowitz
- Status: Active

Location
- Location: 505 Ocean Front Walk, Venice, Los Angeles, California 90291
- Country: United States
- Coordinates: 33°59′35″N 118°28′44″W

Architecture
- Established: c. 1940s (as Bay Cities Synagogue)
- Completed: 1925 (power station completed)

Website
- pjcenter.com

The Pacific Jewish Center, abbreviated as PJC and also known as the Shul on the Beach, is an Orthodox Jewish synagogue located at 505 Ocean Front Walk, in Venice, Los Angeles, California, in the United States. The synagogue is known for its outreach to unaffiliated and disconnected Jews. The Shul remains the last of the synagogues built in Venice during the first part of the 20th century. Although an Orthodox synagogue, worshippers who identify themselves as many different denominations are all welcomed when attending services and other events due to its location in an eclectic neighborhood.

The 1925 building, originally a power station, was identified as a City of Los Angeles landmark.

== History ==
Pacific Jewish Center was established as Bay Cities Synagogue in the 1940s. The congregation was one of several synagogues established in Venice Beach in the 1920s (two others also on the Venice boardwalk). All except this one, and Mishkon Tefilo, had disappeared by the late 1960s. The membership had gradually dwindled until there was hardly a minyan available. However in 1977, a group of young, Orthodox Jews led by Michael Medved and Rabbi Daniel Lapin re-established the community and it soon became the nexus of Orthodox outreach in Los Angeles for the next decade. Lapin was the unpaid rabbi of the congregation from 1978 to 1992.

The Bar Mitzvah of Jason Gould, son of Barbra Streisand and Elliott Gould, was held at the shul.

== Controversy ==
An attempt led by the Pacific Jewish Center to construct an eruv in the Venice Beach neighborhood met with opposition from the Sierra Club and others concerned with impacts to birds or disruption to esthetics of the beach. The California Coastal Commission conditionally approved the project in late 2006.
