= Yehuda Refson =

Rabbi Yehuda Refson (1946 – 22 March 2020) served as the head of the regional Beth Din of Leeds, England, from 1976 until his death in 2020. He was also the local Chabad emissary.

== Career ==
Yehuda Refson was born in Sunderland in 1946. He studied at the Gateshead Yeshiva and at the Brunoy Yeshiva in France.

Dayan Refson arrived in Leeds in 1976.

In addition to his rabbinical (Shomrei Hadas Synagogue), beis din and Chabad emissary/outreach activities, Refson and his wife are co-directors of the Leeds Menorah School.

Refson also has an oversight position regarding the local kosher meat supply.

=== Transportation lawsuit ===
Along with eight others, Refson brought a court case because the city council refused "free school transport ... for the purpose of facilitating the attendance ... at their present schools."

When the court noted that there were closer Jewish schools, albeit not Orthodox, Refson was the key point man, as stated in the court's summary of the case. The court record includes his "I am the decisor of Halachic matters which affect the entire community... my responsibility is for the orthodox community of Leeds."

== Education ==
His early religious education was at Gateshead Yeshiva and then at Yeshiva Tomchei Temimim Lubavitch of Brunoy, France, which was headed by Rabb Nissan Neminov.

Rabbi Refson received religious ordination

- from the central Lubavitch Yeshiva in Brooklyn both as a rabbi and as a rabbinical judge
- from Rabbi Moshe Feinstein as a rabbi.

== Teaching ==
In 2018 he released a four-part online course titled "Soul Talk: The Science of Being."
