= Lee Lapin =

Lee Lapin, 1948–2009, was a popular surveillance and espionage author, best known for his offbeat, grammatically questionable, yet information-rich instructional book series, How to Get Anything On Anybody. The series is published by Paladin Press, is now in its third revision, and is frequently included in library collections across North America.

Lapin reportedly lived on a small island off the coast of Marin County, California where, for relaxation, he raised wolves.

Lee Lapin was the nom de plume of Scott French. He died January 11, 2009, at the home of his son in Colorado.
