= Ephraim Mirvis =

Chief Rabbi of the UK and Commonwealth (born 1956)

Rabbi Sir Ephraim Mirvis KBE
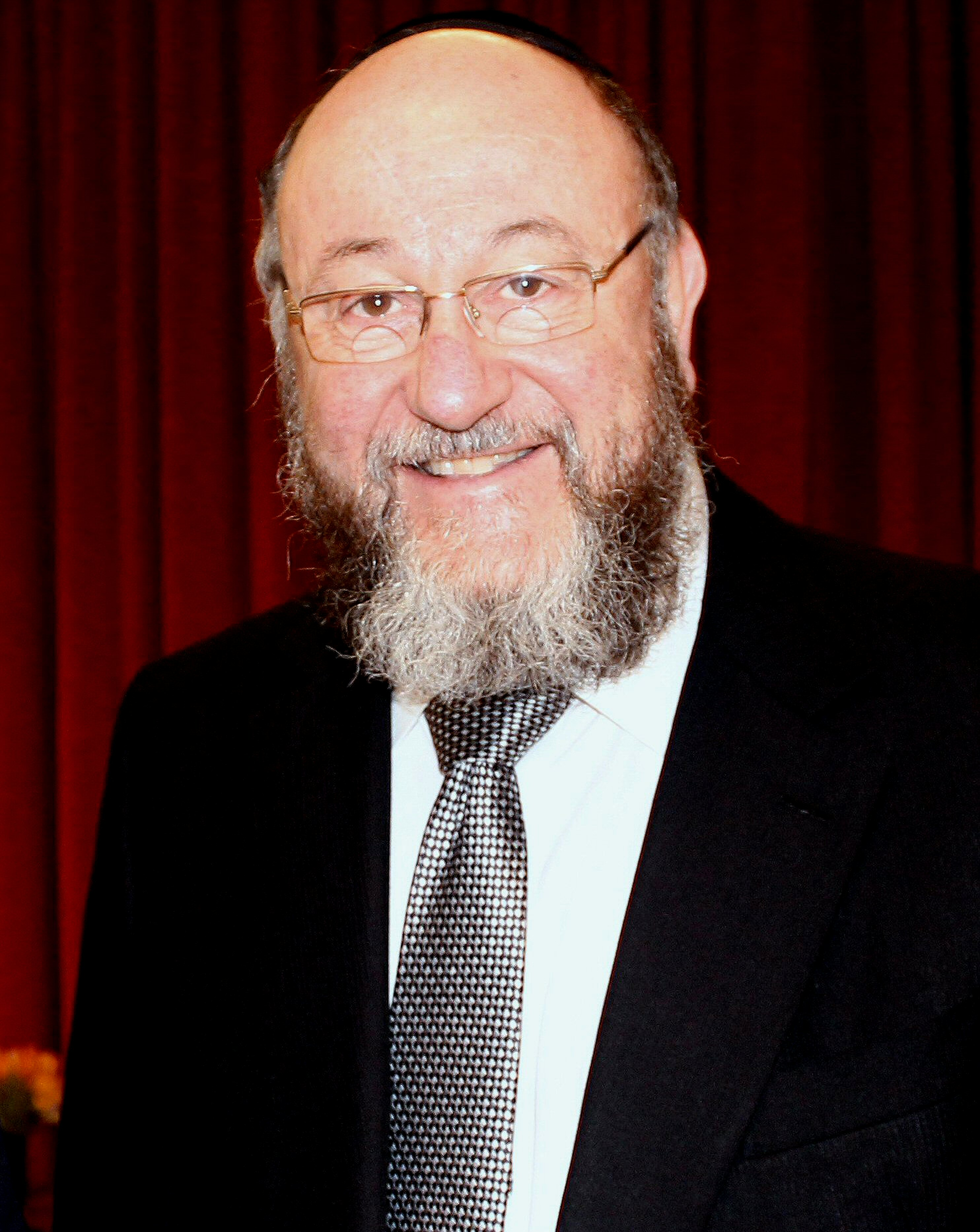
- Mirvis in 2015
- Title: Chief Rabbi of the United Hebrew Congregations of the Commonwealth

Personal life
- Born: Ephraim Yitzchak Mirvis; 7 September 1956 (age 70) Johannesburg, Union of South Africa
- Spouse: Valerie Kaplan Mirvis
- Children: 5
- Education: University of South Africa

Religious life
- Religion: Judaism
- Denomination: Orthodox

Jewish leader
- Predecessor: The Lord Sacks
- Position: Chief Rabbi
- Organisation: United Hebrew Congregations of the Commonwealth
- Began: 1 September 2013
- Residence: London, England
- Semikhah: Machon Ariel, Jerusalem

Sir Ephraim Yitzchak Mirvis KBE (born 7 September 1956) is a South African-born British Orthodox rabbi who serves as the Chief Rabbi of the United Hebrew Congregations of the Commonwealth. He served as the Chief Rabbi of Ireland between 1985 and 1992.

== Early life and education ==
Mirvis was born in Johannesburg, Union of South Africa, in 1956, the son of rabbi Lionel and Freida Mirvis. His father was the rabbi of the Claremont and the Wynberg Hebrew Congregations in Cape Town, as well as Muizenberg Shul in the Western Cape; he also served as rabbi in Benoni for a time, during which Mirvis attended local schools. Mirvis says his father preached against the apartheid system, and visited political prisoners held on Robben Island, while his mother was the principal of the Athlone teacher training college, which was then the country's sole college for training black pre-school teachers. His grandfather, Lazar Mirvis, was a Jewish minister in Johannesburg.

Mirvis's cousin is the American novelist, Tova Mirvis. His nephew Shlomo Mirvis is married to Shira Marili Mirvis, the first woman to serve as the spiritual leader of an Orthodox synagogue in Israel.

Mirvis attended Herzlia High School in Cape Town from 1968 to 1973. After moving to Israel in 1973, Mirvis studied at Yeshivat Kerem B'Yavneh from 1973 to 1976 and Yeshivat Har Etzion, in the West Bank Israeli settlement of Alon Shvut, from 1976 to 1978. He studied at Machon Ariel in Jerusalem from 1978 to 1980 and received his rabbinic ordination there. At the same time, Mirvis obtained a BA in education and classical Hebrew from the University of South Africa and received certification from Yaakov Herzog Teachers College as a high school teacher in Israel.

Mirvis has a deep interest in chazanut and has studied voice and Jewish cantorial music in Jerusalem. He has also been certified as a shochet and mohel.

== Career ==
=== Rabbinical appointments ===
Mirvis led High Holy Days services at Muizenberg Shul in the Western Cape, where his father served as the congregation's rabbi. In 1982, Mirvis was appointed Rabbi of Dublin's Adelaide Road Synagogue and Chief Rabbi of Ireland in 1985, serving at this post until 1992. From 1992 to 1996, he was the rabbi of the Western Marble Arch Synagogue in London, after the previous holder of the position, Rabbi Jonathan Sacks, became Chief Rabbi in 1991.

In May 1996, Mirvis was appointed rabbi at the Finchley United Synagogue, also known as Kinloss, in London. There, he founded and directed a community-based, adult education programme, the Kinloss Learning Centre, which has drawn hundreds of participants on a weekly basis since 2003 and has served as an educational model emulated by other communities. Mirvis is the founder rabbi and honorary principal of Morasha Jewish Primary School and founder and President of the Kinloss Community Kollel.

=== Other positions held ===
While living in Ireland, Mirvis was chairman of the Board of Governors of Stratford Jewish Schools, in Dublin, from 1984 to 1992. Mirvis has been a member of the Steering Committee of the Conference of European Rabbis since 1986 and has served as its Associate President since 2013. In 1992, he arranged and hosted the Biennial Conference of European Rabbis at the Western Marble Arch Synagogue and in 2001, he led the first group visit by United Synagogue rabbis to the United States.

Mirvis has been the Religious Advisor to the Jewish Marriage Council since 1997. He has served on the Council of the London School of Jewish Studies, on the Steering Committee of the Encounter Conference and the Singer's Prayer Book Publications Committee. He was Chairman of the Rabbinical Council of the United Synagogue from 1999 to 2002. As the Chief Rabbi of the United Hebrew Congregations, he is also the President of the London School of Jewish Studies. He has been a Patron of Prisoners Abroad, a human rights and welfare charity, since 2014.

Chief Rabbi Mirvis currently sits on the Standing Committee of the Conference of European Rabbis, and recognises the importance of advocating for Kosher food.

=== Interfaith relations ===
==== Christians ====
Mirvis served as the President of the Irish Council of Christians and Jews (CCJ) from 1985 to 1992. He has participated in dialogue with Church leaders in the UK at Windsor Castle and Lambeth Palace. In 2005, he addressed a CCJ meeting at the Synod of the Church of England.

In 2016, Mirvis launched the 'In Good Faith' programme, in partnership with Justin Welby, the then Archbishop of Canterbury. The initiative is a way of bringing Anglican and Jewish clergy together so that they might encourage their respective congregations to work on interfaith projects together.

==== Muslims ====
Mirvis was the first United Synagogue rabbi to host an address by an imam, Mohammed Essam El-Din Fahim, in his synagogue. He has also led a delegation of members of his community to the Finchley Mosque and initiated a joint project between his synagogue and the mosque for a Jewish-Muslim public service day on 25 December.

=== Chief Rabbi of the United Kingdom ===
In 2012, Mirvis was named as a possible successor to Jonathan, Lord Sacks as Chief Rabbi of the United Hebrew Congregations of the Commonwealth, along with Rabbi Harvey Belovski, Rabbi Shmuley Boteach, Rabbi Michael Broyde, Rabbi Warren Goldstein, and Rabbi Michael Melchior. Mirvis was named his successor as Chief Rabbi of the United Hebrew Congregations of the Commonwealth on 17 December 2012. He took office on 1 September 2013.

His appointment was welcomed by the Conference of European Rabbis. Jeremy Newmark, chief executive of the secular Jewish Leadership Council in the UK, called the appointment "immensely popular." Rabbi Laura Janner-Klausner, the senior rabbi of the Movement for Reform Judaism in Great Britain, said: "I welcome the appointment of Mirvis as another powerful voice for British Jewry. I look forward to working closely with him as a partner on areas of common interests to the Jewish and wider community." The Orthodox Union in the United States also welcomed Mirvis' selection as the Chief Rabbi.

== Views ==
Mirvis was an advocate for the freedom of Soviet Jewry as Chairman of the Irish National Council for Soviet Jewry from 1984 to 1992. In 1986 he lobbied successfully against the request of a Dutch Nazi war criminal, Pieter Menten, to reside in Ireland. Mirvis has led campaigns to improve the quality of life, safety and security in and around synagogues in the United Kingdom and Lond

Shortly after beginning his tenure, Mirvis announced that he would become the first Chief Rabbi to attend the annual Limmud Conference, a move which was considered extremely controversial at the time and a departure from the approach of his predecessor Rabbi Lord Jonathan Sacks.

=== Israel ===
As Chief Rabbi of Ireland and before the opening of an Israeli Embassy in Ireland, he represented Israel's interests at government level and in the media. In 1999, he led a group of British rabbis on a solidarity trip to Israel. Since 1997, he hosted the annual Bnei Akiva Yom Ha'atzmaut service at Finchley shul where it is still held. Regarding the 2014 Israel–Gaza conflict, while deploring the loss of life in Gaza, Mirvis defended Israel's right to protect itself from Hamas rocket attacks, adding that the conflict was used as a cover to voice antisemitic sentiment.

=== Women's role in Judaism ===
Mirvis has supported the expanding of women's roles in Orthodox Judaism. In 2012, he appointed Lauren Levin as Britain's first Orthodox female halakhic adviser, at Finchley Shul in London. He also supports Shabbat prayer groups for Orthodox women, saying, "Some of our congregations have women prayer groups for Friday night, some Saturday mornings. This is without women reading from the Torah. But for women to come together as a group to pray, this is a good thing." He also supports women becoming United Synagogue trustees, and Orthodox women reciting Kaddish. In 2016, Mirvis launched a new qualification for female educators to be advisers on Jewish law in the area of family purity and as adult educators in Orthodox shuls. The part-time training course, known as the Ma'ayan Programme, is 18 months long and is the first such course in the United Kingdom.

Mirvis has made strides to encourage women to participate in advanced Jewish learning, creating a series of events to encourage them to do so under the brand Neshama. Mirvis also upholds the normative Orthodox Jewish positions that female rabbis and same-sex marriages are not permitted.

=== LGBT ===
In September 2018, Mirvis issued a guide on the well-being of LGBT+ pupils in Orthodox Jewish schools. The guide was the first of its kind anywhere in the world. It upheld the traditional prohibitions against the act of homosexuality, but was nevertheless considered controversial by some Haredi and Hasidic Orthodox groups, in part because it made clear that the Torah still demands "sensitivity to the feelings of everyone, including LGBT+ people", and that there should be a zero-tolerance approach to either homophobic or transphobic bullying or disregard for their wellbeing. He also stated "Young LGBT+ people in the Jewish community often express feelings of deep isolation, loneliness and a sense that they can never be themselves. Many are living with the fear that if they share their struggles with anyone they will be expelled, ridiculed and even rejected by family and friends. They may even be struggling with a loss of emunah (faith, trust in God) and the fear of losing their place of acceptance and belonging in the Jewish community."

=== British politics ===
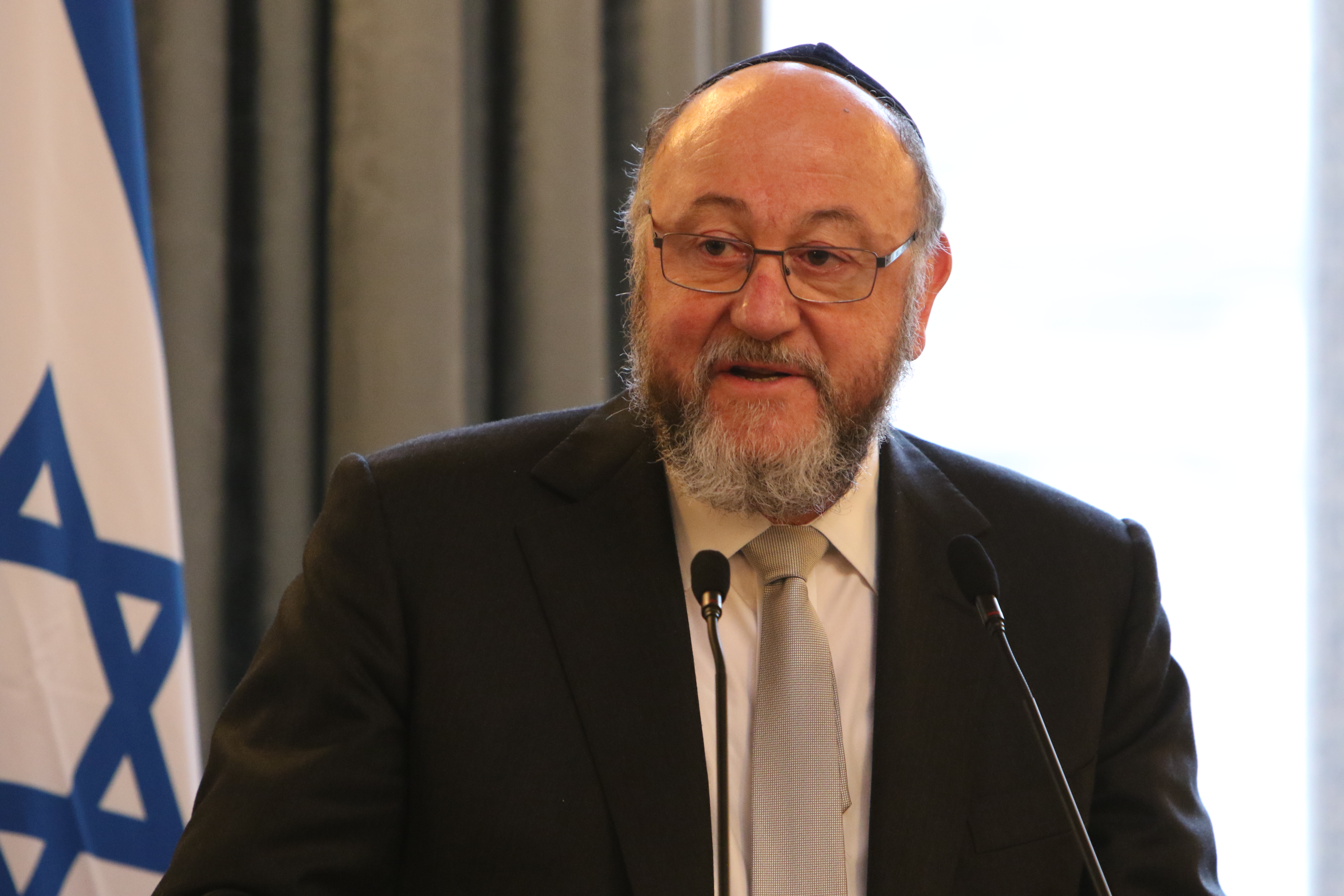
Mirvis speaking at a Holocaust Memorial Day event on January 23, 2018, in London.

In late November 2019, Mirvis made an unprecedented intervention in British politics by stating in The Times that the Labour Party candidate Jeremy Corbyn was unfit for high office. While allowing that "Convention dictates that the Chief Rabbi stays well away from party politics – and rightly so", he added that the forthcoming elections constituted an exception, since "the very soul of our nation is at stake". According to Mirvis, "the overwhelming majority of British Jews are gripped by anxiety" over the possibility that Labour might win the election and over perceived inadequacies in the Labour Party's handling of anti-Jewish racism. Such racism was incompatible with British values. Arguing that Corbyn's statements that the issues have been dealt with were a "mendacious fiction", he suggested that voters go to the polls to make a "conscience vote".

The Archbishop of Canterbury Justin Welby echoed Mirvis's concerns about Jewish sensitivities. A Labour spokeswoman replied that "Jeremy Corbyn is a lifelong campaigner against anti-Semitism and has made absolutely clear it has no place in our party and society and that no one who engages in it does so in his name."

Mirvis also condemned Corbyn's successor as Labour leader, Sir Keir Starmer, when his government announced a partial limitation on arms sales to Israel in September 2024: "This announcement feeds the falsehood that Israel is in breach of International Humanitarian Law, when in fact it is going to extraordinary lengths to uphold it."

== Achievements ==
Following his appointment, he created the ‘Centre for Community excellence’. This new department of the Office of the Chief Rabbi provides guidance and seed funding to Jewish communities, in order to promote the most creative and dynamic programming ideas. One of his most successful campaigns is ‘Shabbat UK’ which was based upon the Shabbat Project, which originated in South Africa. The campaign encourages all Jews, regardless of religious affiliation or level of observance to engage better with Shabbat and reaches tens of thousands of people across the country.

In 2017, when Rabbi Joseph Dweck, Senior Rabbi of the S&P Sephardi Jewish community in the UK, made controversial comments about aspects of Jewish law, including on homosexuality, a bitter scandal erupted which threatened to split the Orthodox Sephardic Jewish establishment. It was Mirvis who stepped in to defuse the row, enabling Dweck to remain in his position although several rabbis still opposed this and one prominent Sephardic Rabbi lashed out at the Chief Rabbi claiming he had sold out the United Synagogue to Reform.

== Honours, awards and recognition ==
Mirvis received the Jerusalem Prize for Education in the Diaspora in 1990, on behalf of the Stratford Jewish Schools, from the President of Israel, Chaim Herzog. In 2015 he was awarded the Freedom of the London Borough of Barnet. He has received honorary doctorates from Touro College and Middlesex University.

In 2024, The Jerusalem Post named Mirvis to its "50 Most Influential Jews" list alongside Ammiel Hirsch, Hirschy Zarchi, and Yuda Drizin for "spiritual guidance in trying times".

Mirvis was appointed Knight Commander of the Order of the British Empire (KBE) in the 2023 New Year Honours for services to the Jewish community, interfaith relations and education.

== Personal life ==
Mirvis married Rhodesian-born Valerie Kaplan in Israel. They have four sons, Hillel, Daniel, Noam and Eitan, and nineteen grandchildren. Their eldest child, Liora Graham, died of cancer in 2011. Valerie Mirvis was a front-line Child Protection Social Worker until May 2012. She is a published author and healthcare specialist.

He is a supporter of Tottenham Hotspur.

Jewish titles
Preceded by David Rosen	Chief Rabbi of Ireland; 1985–1992	Succeeded by Gavin Broder
Preceded by Jonathan, Lord Sacks	Chief Rabbi of Great Britain and the Commonwealth	Incumbent
