= Gateshead Talmudical College =

Yeshiva in Gateshead, England

Coordinates: 54°57′11″N 1°36′38″W

- ישיבת בית יוסף גייטסהעד

Location
- 88 Windermere Street; Gateshead, NE8 1UB; United Kingdom

Information
- School type: Yeshiva gedola
- Religious affiliation: Haredi Judaism
- Established: 1929; 97 years ago
- Founder: Rabbi Dovid Dryan
- Rosh yeshiva: Rabbi Avrohom Gurwicz
- Enrollment: 350 (2019)
- Website: gatesheadyeshiva.org

Gateshead Talmudical College (Hebrew: ישיבת בית יוסף גייטסהעד), popularly known as Gateshead Yeshiva, is located in the Bensham area of Gateshead in North East England. It is the largest yeshiva in Europe and considered to be one of the most prestigious advanced yeshivas in the Orthodox world. The student body currently (as of 2019) numbers approx. 350. Although students are mainly British, there are Europeans, Americans, and Canadians, as well as some from South America, Australia and South Africa. Most students are Litvish, but up to a third are Hasidic.

== History ==
A group photo of the students and staff, probably from the early 1930s.

The yeshiva was founded in Gateshead in 1929 by Reb Dovid Dryan, with the Chofetz Chaim serving as an active patron and appointing the original head of the yeshiva. The first rosh yeshiva and menahel (principal) were respectively Rabbi Nachman Landinski and Rabbi Eliezer Kahan, both alumni of the Novardok yeshiva network and both of whom had escaped Communist Russia's religious persecution by escaping across the border from Russia to Poland.

Originally, Rabbi Avraham Sacharov was designated as the first rosh yeshiva, but Chief Rabbi Joseph Hertz asked William Joynson Hicks, the Home Secretary, to block Sacharov's immigration in an attempt to prevent the establishment of a yeshiva outside his jurisdiction. The attempt failed, and Landynski, Sacharov's brother-in-law, was appointed instead. At its inception, Gateshead Yeshiva was seen as a branch of Novardok, officially sharing its doctrines, ideals and methodology and named "Yeshivas Beis Yosef" in common with other branches of Novardok.

By 1948, an official American fundraising (including registration as a domestic not-for-profit corporation) was established. (501(C)3)

As of 2020, the Yeshiva is the only one in England to have government accreditation, and the lunchroom has been rated "5 (Very Good)" for Food Hygiene.

== Notable faculty ==
Roshei yeshiva:

- 1929-1951: Rabbi Nachman Dovid Landinski, an alumnus of Radin, Eishyshok, Kelm, Mir, Łomża and Suvalk yeshivas

=== Biography ===
Rabbi Nachman Dovid was born in Radin in 1902. His father was Rabbi Moshe Landinski, Rosh Yeshivas Radin and Rosh Kollel Kodshim. Even at a young age, his prodigious mind was apparent; at the age of nine, he was sent away from home to study under the tutelage of R' Zundel M'eishyshok. By the time of his bar-mitzvah, he was farhered on Tumim Baal Peh. After studying in Novardok, he continued to serve as Rosh Yeshiva in several Novardok yeshivos (Novardok had a large network of yeshivos), although he eventually came to the attention of the Communist authorities, and had to escape from town to town, where he would continue to give talks to the local young men.

After escaping White Russia, he was appointed Rosh Yeshiva of Vishkava, a suburb of Warsaw, Poland. His students benefited from his tremendous koach hasbarah. Shortly after 1930, upon the recommendation of the Chafetz Chaim, he was appointed Rosh Yeshiva of Gateshead, or, to put it more accurately, he was appointed with the task of "establishing" a yeshiva in Gateshead. Reb Nachman Dovid invested all his talent into securing students and funds for the fledgling yeshiva, and thus established a place of Torah in the English "wasteland".

He often gave his lessons with no books open in front of him, displaying an uncommon talmudic mastery.

In the aftermath of the war, the Rosh Yeshiva took in Rabbi Leib Lopian and Rabbi Leib Gurwicz as maggidei shiur, the former in 1947, the latter in 1948.

The Rosh Yeshiva's son, Yankel Landinski, was diagnosed with haemophilia, and the students set up a blood bank for him. In 1951, the Rosh Yeshiva brought him to the USA for treatment, but eventually he succumbed to his disease. In the Rosh Yeshiva's absence, the Yeshiva was taken over by Rabbis Lopian and Gurwicz. When the Rosh Yeshiva planned on returning, he was informed that they should not return to him his position; something that Rabbi Shakovitzki declared to be a tremendous avlah.

The Rosh Yeshiva died in 1968 in the United States.

- 1947-1979: Rabbi Leib Lopian, son of Rabbi Elyah Lopian, an alumnus of Telz yeshiva
- 1947-1982: Rabbi Leib Gurwicz, an alumnus of Mir, Baranovitch and Brisk yeshivas
- 1984-: Rosh Yeshiva: Rabbi Avrohom Gurwicz, an alumnus of Brisk yeshiva, and a past student

Mashgichim:

- Rabbi Moshe Schwab
- Rabbi Matisyohu Salomon
- Rabbi Mordechai Yosef Karnowsky

== Notable alumni ==
Over its history, Gateshead Yeshiva has produced thousands of alumni, among them prominent rabbis.

- Rabbi Harvey Belovski (rabbi of Golders Green United Synagogue)
- Dayan Berel Berkovits (Dayan of the Federation of Synagogues)
- Yigal Calek, conductor and composer
- Rabbi Dr. Nathan Lopes Cardozo (founder and Dean of the David Cardozo Academy)
- Rabbi Pini Dunner (Senior Rabbi at Beverly Hills Synagogue, California, USA)
- Dayan Chanoch Ehrentreu (head dayan of London Beth Din)
- Professor Paul W. Franks (professor of Jewish Philosophy, Yale University)
- Rabbi Boruch Horovitz (Rosh Yeshiva of Dvar Yerushalayim)
- Rabbi Yaakov Moshe Hillel (Rosh Yeshiva of Ahavat Shalom)
- Dayan Casriel Dovid Kaplin (dayan of London Beth Din)
- Rabbi Daniel Lapin
- Professor Ze'ev Lev (founder of the Jerusalem College of Technology)
- Paul Reichmann, Canadian businessman
- Rabbi Jonathan Rietti (lecturer at Gateways)
- Dayan Yehuda Refson (Chief religious judge, Leeds, England)
- Rabbi Yitzchok Tuvia Weiss (Gaavad, Edah HaChareidis, Jerusalem)
- Rabbi David Leibel

== Academic approach ==
The yeshiva's academic approach emphasises a deep and thorough understanding of the literal meaning of the Gemara. This method involves meticulous examination of each word to achieve profound comprehension. The educational philosophy discourages abstract pilpul (dialectical argumentation) for its own sake, instead encouraging deeper insights to emerge naturally from the foundational understanding of the text. This approach represents a synthesis of the analytical rigour of Telz (associated with Rabbi Leib Lopian) and the expansive, elucidative style of Mir (where Rabbi Leib Gurwicz studied), both infused with the devotion of Novardok, influenced by Rabbi Eliezer Kahan. The curriculum covers traditional yeshiva tractates and also includes a structured study of Jewish law (seder halachah), a feature not universally present in yeshivas.

The yeshiva was originally established as a branch of the Novardok network of yeshivas then existing in Eastern Europe. The primary focal point of Novardok hashkafa is extreme reliance on Divine providence and commitment to achieving spiritual goals without feeling encumbered by physical and material constraints.

Chavrusas are arranged at an event called Yom HaChavrusa where older students take responsibility for newer students. The faculty includes several shoel u'meishivs available to guide students during their study sessions.

== Buildings and structure ==
When Rabbi Landinski arrived in Gateshead he began to teach in the 'Blechenner Shul', a tin shed synagogue, which in 1939 was replaced with the current Gateshead community synagogue. The original building procured by the yeshiva was at 179 Bewick Road. As the yeshiva expanded it acquired neighbouring properties in Rectory Road and at 177 Bewick Road. In 1961 a new building was erected at 88 Windermere Street to house a new beth hamedresh (the hall used for study and prayer), with the dining room on the floor below and the kitchens in the basement. The old beth hamedresh building at 179 Bewick Road and neighbouring houses in Rectory Road were demolished to make way for a new two-storey dormitory block, Clore House, which was opened in 1963, forming the beginnings of the yeshiva campus. A later three-storey building further up Bewick Road joined the first dormitory block and attached the yeshiva dormitories with the back of the study hall via a bridge. Later on, in 1992, a new building, Sebba House was built, which consisted of a more modern dormitory building for about 70 students. In 1997 a new building, Tiferes Yonasan, was erected, which attached the study hall further down Windermere Street to the dormitories and extended the main building, including the study hall and the dining room. The last extension on the right hand side added more lecture halls. In addition, these extensions created a courtyard leading on from the back alley, from Rydal Street.

The yeshiva is currently planning on building a new building on Rectory Road, across from the main yeshiva building. This will include dormitories, shiur rooms, offices, and laundry and bakery facilities.

== Gateshead Foundation for Torah ==
The Gateshead Foundation for Torah was established in 1966 "to further the publication of Jewish literature." Among the works they've published are:

- Sefer Roshei she'arim
- Sabbath Shiurim: 5729
- Sabbath Shiurim: 5739

== Sources ==
- Gateshead: Its community, Its personalities, Its Institutions by Miriam Dansky (1992), ISBN 0-944070-88-4 is a unique history of the Gateshead Jewish community and in particular its famous yeshiva.
- Gateshead Book of Days by Jo Bath, Richard F. Stevenson (2013), ISBN 0750951923
