= Gateways (organization) =

Gateways is an international organization whose self-declared mission is it to "raise Jewish consciousness."

== Origins ==
Gateways was founded in 1998 by Rabbi Mordechai Suchard with the stated goal of "providing opportunities for Jews to unlock the treasure of their heritage through dynamic educational and social programs." The organization is based in Monsey, New York, United States. It began as an American offshoot of Arachim (meaning "values"), an Israeli Judaism outreach organization founded in 1979. Funding for Gateways is entirely from individual donors.

== Programs ==
The programs educate in Jewish values and traditions." Gateways often joins with other organizations to co-sponsor events.

Programs include:

- Family education.
- Learning programs for collegiates and young professionals.
- Services focused on the Russian American Jewish community.
- Singles networking and matchmaking.
- Learning opportunities via the internet, including an "Ask the rabbi" portal.
- Life skills and professional development seminars.
- Jewish holiday programs.

In addition to the New York metropolitan area, the organization hosts events throughout the United States.

== Gateways personalities ==
Gateways is staffed by a team of 45 working in seven departments.

=== Rabbi Mordechai Suchard ===
Rabbi Mordechai Suchard, left, with a guest at the Gateways Shavuot Retreat in 2008

Rabbi Mordechai Suchard is the founder and executive director of Gateways. He is a Jewish educator, speaker and author.

==== Biography ====
Suchard was born in South Africa. His father is a dayan (ecclesiastical "judge") on the Johannesburg Beth Din. He studied at the Telshe yeshiva, in Cleveland, Ohio. He attended Ponevezh in Bnei Brak, Israel, and received his rabbinic ordination from Rabbi Itzhak Kolitz, the Chief Rabbi of Jerusalem and Dean of the Jerusalem Beth Din.

Suchard founded Gateways to promote the continuity of Judaism. He has established and run a network of outreach organizations targeting college students, young professionals, singles and Russian immigrants in the United States. He is active in Jewish education on the Internet. Suchard has served on the rabbinical board of "Ask The Rabbi" answering questions about Jewish law, philosophy and ethics.

He speaks across America on Jewish issues such as prophecy and seeing God in one's life.

Suchard was on the American delegation accompanying US President George Bush when he visited Israel in May 2008 to mark the country's sixtieth birthday celebrations.

==== Political views ====
Rabbi Suchard is a supporter of Senator Joe Lieberman, contributing to his political campaign from 2002 to 2006.

=== Rabbi Mordechai Becher ===
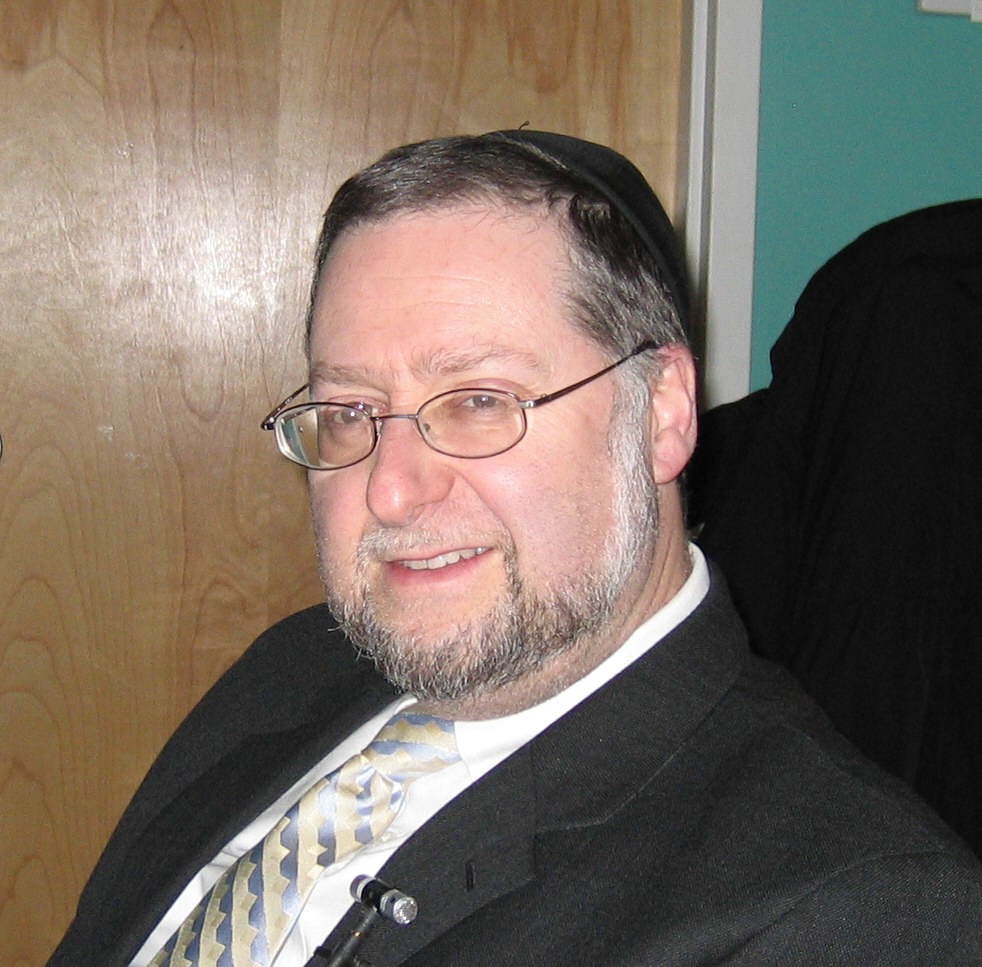
Rabbi Mordechai Becher before a presentation, February 2009

Rabbi Mordechai Becher is an author and lecturer on topics of Jewish philosophy and ritual law and practice.

==== Biography ====
Born in Australia, Becher attended the Bialik College in Melbourne for elementary school. He received his rabbinic ordination from the Chief Rabbinate of Israel and the Chief Rabbi of Jerusalem. Shortly thereafter, he started lecturing at Neve Yerushalayim, Darchei Binah and Ohr Somayach College, remaining at the latter for 15 years. He also served as a senior lecturer at Ohr Somayach Thornhill for four years in Toronto, Ontario, from 1992 to 1996.

Becher first moved to Israel in 1978, and served in the armoured infantry in the Israel Defense Forces,. He was an army chaplain, teaching in training programs for rabbis and educators. His wife, Chavy, is from Philadelphia, Pennsylvania in 1985 and lived for a time in Kiryat Moshe, Israel. He has co-authored two books on contemporary issues in Jewish law and has responded to legal, ethical and philosophical questions on the Ohr Somayach "Ask the Rabbi" website.

Becher considers Rabbi Moshe Shapiro to be his rebbe, or primary mentor in areas of Torah and Judaism.

Becher lives with his wife and their six children in Passaic Park. He is an instructor at Yeshiva University.

==== Gateways ====
Becher is a Senior Lecturer for Gateways. He also lectures for Project Genesis and is one of the leading voices in American Orthodox Jewish outreach.

He is known for his sense of humor, evidenced by some of the lectures he delivers, with titles including "Guns and Moses: A Jewish Perspective on Politics," "The Rooster, the Tree and the SUV," "First Fruits, Cheeseburgers and Lord of the Flies" and "Shabbos: Who Invented the Weekend Anyway?"

==== Other endeavors ====
Becher is the author of books, including Avodat Ahavah (Labor of Love, available only in Hebrew) covering the Jewish laws related to kiruv. He co-authored After the Return: A Guide for the Newly Observant with Moshe Newman and wrote Gateway to Judaism: The What, How and Why of Jewish Life. Becher has contributed to the development of computer software programs related to Israeli geography.

Becher has a radio show on OU-Radio, which operates in a question and answer format. Becher is the host of a cable television show that airs on Shalom TV, carried on Time Warner Cable's Channel 1 On Demand entitled "Dimensions of the Daf," a reference to the Talmud, a page of which is referred to as a daf. Becher has given lectures for organizations that include the UJA and the Zionist Organization of America.

Becher has studied comparative religion, archeology and history and is on the speakers list of the Israeli Consulate in New York.

- Lectures by Rabbi Mordechai Becher

=== Rabbi Jonathan Rietti ===
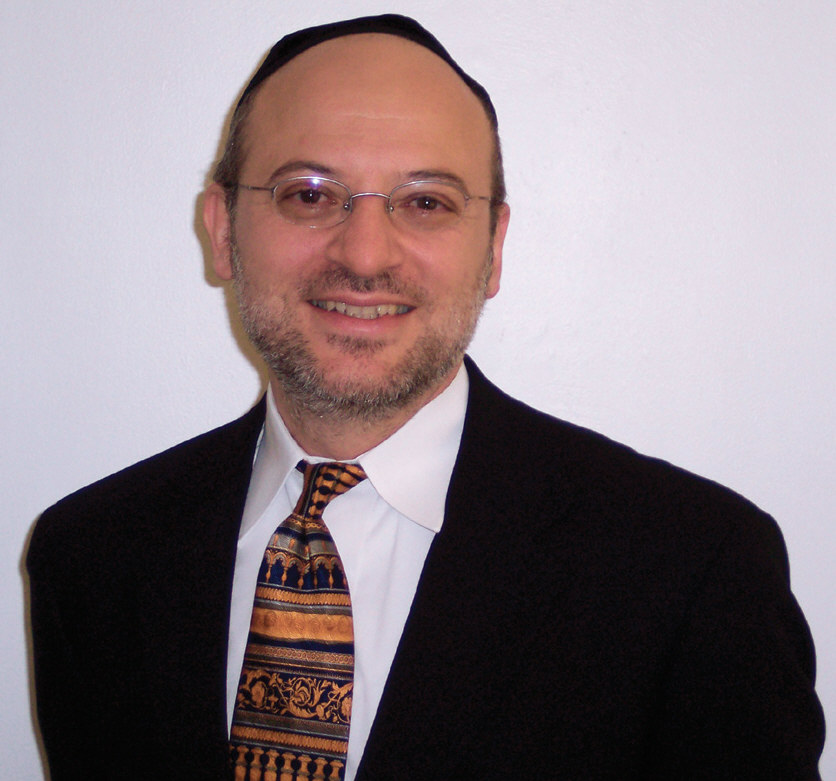
Rabbi Jonathan Rietti

Rabbi Jonathan Rietti is an English-born Rabbi, educator, and prominent speaker.

==== Biography ====
Rietti was born in London, the son of British actor and director Robert Rietti.

A descendant of the Sephardic leader the Ben Ish Chai, Rabbi Rietti studied at Dvar Yerushalaim under Rabbi Baruch Horovitz and then went on to receiving his rabbinical ordination from Gateshead Talmudical College and was then involved in establishing a growing kollel in Gibraltar.

Rietti is a senior lecturer for Gateways. He lectures on Jewish life and identity, lecturing throughout the United States. He possesses a Master's degree in education and has been an educational consultant since 1986, offering guidance to parents of gifted and ADD children.

Rietti is the author of a book entitled The Art of Healthy Living, based on Maimonides' teachings of healthy diet.

He runs educational seminars and lectures, focusing on inner growth, relationships, positive parenting, health, and support for the authenticity of Judaism. He has recorded over 200 lectures.

== See also ==
- Baal teshuva
- Jewish fundamentalism
- Jewish Renaissance
- Orthodox Judaism outreach
