= Golders Green United Synagogue =

Synagogue in London, United Kingdom

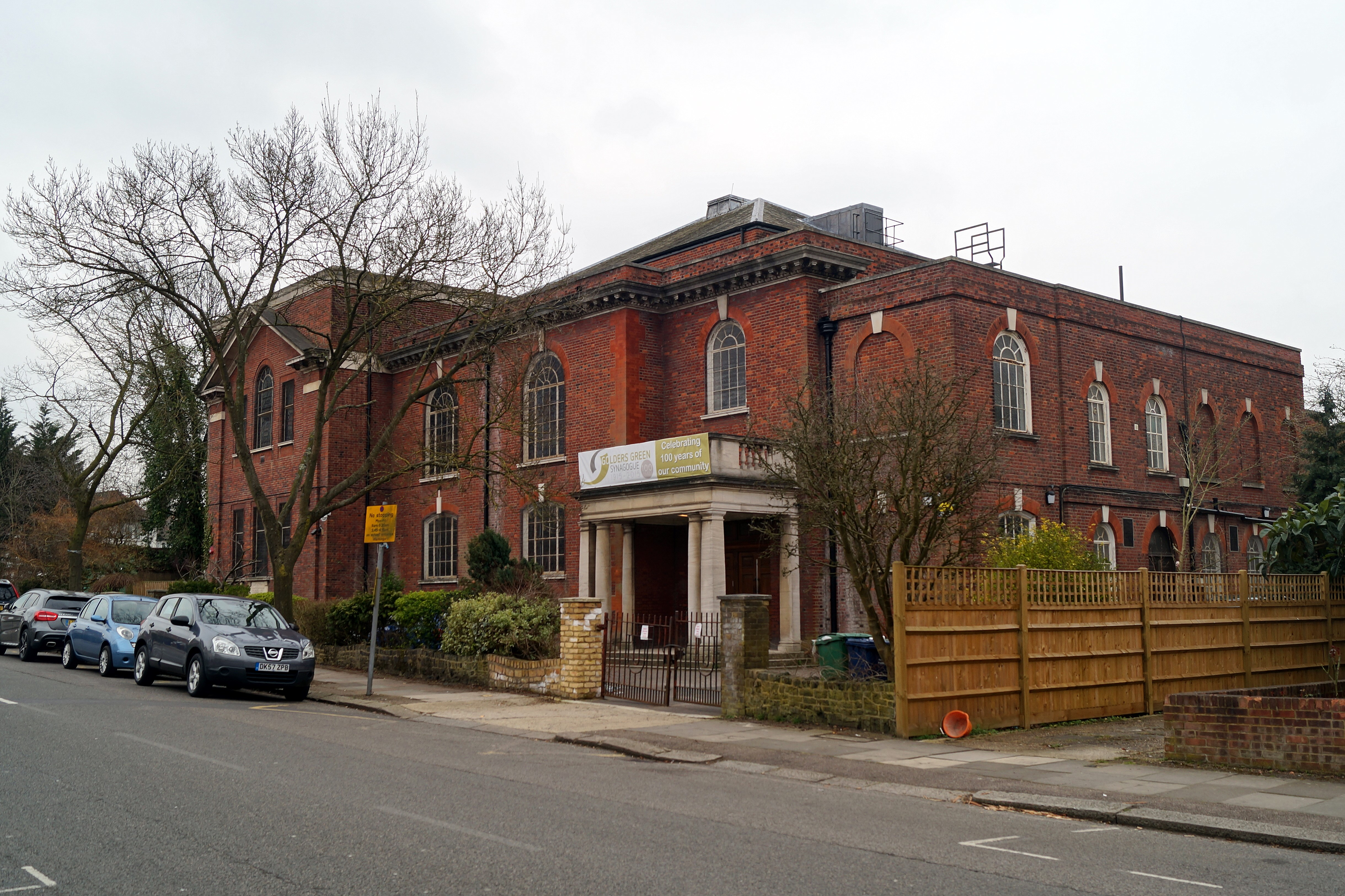
- The synagogue, in 2016

- Location of the synagogue in Greater London

Religion
- Affiliation: Orthodox Judaism
- Rite: Nusach Ashkenaz
- Ecclesiastical or organizational status: Synagogue
- Leadership: Rabbi Sam Fromson; Rebbetzin Dr Hadassah Fromson
- Status: Active

Location
- Location: 41 Dunstan Road, Golders Green, Borough of Barnet, London, England, NW11 8AE
- Country: United Kingdom
- Interactive map of Golders Green United Synagogue
- Coordinates: 51°34′06″N 0°12′01″W

Architecture
- Established: 1915 (as a congregation)
- Completed: 1922; 104 years ago

Website
- goldersgreenshul.org.uk

Listed Building – Grade II
- Official name: Golders Green Synagogue
- Type: Listed building
- Designated: 20 May 2007
- Reference no.: 1393834

Golders Green United Synagogue is an Orthodox Jewish congregation and synagogue, located at 41 Dunstan Road, Golders Green, in the Borough of Barnet in London, England, in the United Kingdom.

== History ==
It dates to 1915 when services were first held, during the First World War, in the hall of Golders Green Parish Church. The current synagogue building in Dunstan Road, which was designated a Grade II listed building on 20 May 2007, opened in 1922 and currently serves more than 500 member households.

Golders Green Synagogue is closely associated with Rimon Jewish Primary School, which opened its doors in 2012 on the synagogue premises.
