= Elyah Lopian =

Rabbi of the Mussar Movement

Rabbi Eliyahu Lopian (Hebrew: אליה לופיאן; 1876 – 21 September 1970), known as Reb Elyah, was a rabbi of the Mussar Movement.

== Biography ==
Lopian was born in Grajewo, Poland in 1876 and studied at the yeshiva in Łomża and at the Kelm Talmud Torah of Rabbi Simcha Zissel Ziv. He immigrated to England in 1928, where he was the rosh yeshiva of the Etz Chaim Yeshiva in the East End of London, working for many years alongside Rabbi Nachman Shlomo Greenspan. His wife Soroh Leah Rotman died in 1934, shortly after the engagement of their daughter Lieba to Rabbi Leib Gurwicz.

In 1950 he left the Etz Chaim Yeshiva and immigrated to Israel where he taught and was Mashgiach Ruchani at the Knesses Chizkiyahu yeshiva located in Zikhron Ya'akov (and later Kfar Hasidim).

He died in Israel on 21 September 1970, and was buried in the Mount of Olives Jewish Cemetery.

He had 13 children. After his death a street was named in his honor in the Ramat Shlomo neighborhood of Jerusalem.

His work Lev Eliyahu was edited by his students.
