= Lauderdale Road Spanish & Portuguese Synagogue =

Synagogue in the City of Westminster, London, England

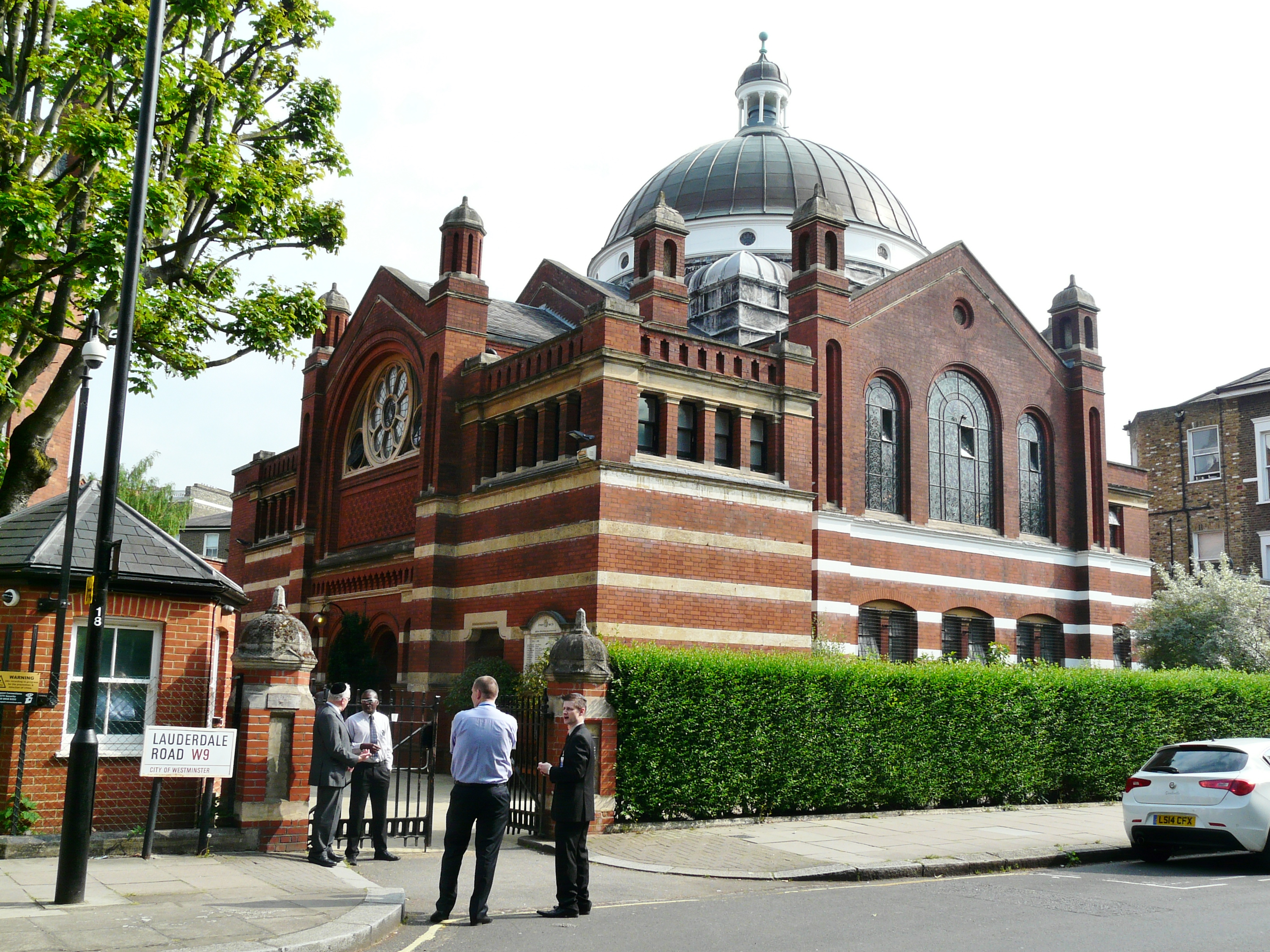
- The synagogue in 2014

- Location of the synagogue in the City of Westminster

Religion
- Affiliation: Orthodox Judaism
- Rite: Spanish & Portuguese Sephardi
- Ecclesiastical or organisational status: Synagogue
- Leadership: Senior Rabbi Joseph Dweck
- Status: Active

Location
- Location: Lauderdale Road, 2 Ashworth Road, Maida Vale, City of Westminster, London, England W9 1JY
- Country: United Kingdom
- Coordinates: 51°31′40″N 0°11′05″W

Architecture
- Architects: Davis & Emanuel
- Type: Synagogue architecture
- Style: Byzantine Revival
- Established: 1657 (as a congregation)
- Completed: 1896

Website
- sephardi.org.uk/lauderdale

Listed Building – Grade II
- Official name: Spanish and Portuguese Synagogue
- Type: Listed Building
- Designated: 6 September 1989
- Reference no.: 1264017

The Lauderdale Road Spanish & Portuguese Synagogue, more commonly called the Lauderdale Road Synagogue, is an Orthodox Jewish congregation and synagogue, located in Maida Vale on Lauderdale Road in the City of Westminster, West London, England, in the United Kingdom.

The synagogue is the community hub of the S&P Sephardi Community, also known as Qahal Qadosh Shaar Shamayim (Hebrew translation: "The Holy Congregation of the Gate of Heaven"). The congregation worships in the Sephardi rite, and it is the oldest Jewish community and largest of Sephardi origin in the United Kingdom.

The synagogue, completed in 1896, was designated as a Grade II listed building in 1989.

== History ==
Logo of the congregation

The Spanish and Portuguese Jews’ Congregation of London was founded in 1657 following a petition by Rabbi Menashe Ben Israel of Amsterdam to Oliver Cromwell from six Jews living in London who sought permission to worship freely and to acquire land for a cemetery. Cromwell provided a verbal guarantee and it was the first time that Jews were able to profess their faith openly since their 1290 expulsion by Edward I.

=== A move across London ===
The history of Lauderdale Road synagogue is history of the move across London by the Sephardi community. Until the mid-nineteenth century there was only one Sephardi synagogue in London, Bevis Marks Synagogue, in East London at the edge of the City of London. Poorer community of families originally from Spain and Portugal, many of them crypto-Jewish refugees from the Spanish and Portuguese inquisitions, had originally congregated in this area in the eighteenth century.

However, by the mid-nineteenth century, the single synagogue meant that members of the Sephardi community resident in wealthier West London had no Sephardi place of worship or were forced to walk across town on the Sabbath for prayers. The drift of Sephardi Jews away from East London gathered pace leading to diminished presence at Bevis Marks and the need for a new synagogue. As the community rose in prosperity and West London emerged as the capital’s most desirable district, this movement accelerated.

The community’s first West London Sephardi synagogue was established in Wigmore Street in 1853; in 1867 it moved to Bryanston Street, near Marble Arch. However in the 1880s, as Victorian London evolved, the community continued to shift westwards and attendance at Bryanston Street declined. In 1892 it was ascertained only 64 members of the congregation were living within a mile of Bryanston Street, but that 93 lived within the same distance of Clifton Road, in Maida Vale, which was fast emerging as the heart of the community. A total of 62 per cent of members of the London Sephardi community were living in North West and West London. This led to the decision being taken to build a large synagogue in the area.

=== The Sephardi cousinhood ===
The Lauderdale Road Synagogue opened in 1896. The synagogue building was constructed in the Byzantine Revival style by architects Davis & Emanuel. Its interiors reflect the success of its membership in the late nineteenth century in global commerce across the British Empire and beyond. It has a large domed ceiling, grand stained glass windows set in arched recesses, tapestry carpets across the polished wooden floors, as well as a large ark.

The nineteenth century history of Lauderdale Road is wrapped up with the Sephardi families of what the chronicler of Jewish life in Britain Chaim Bermant called "the Cousinhood" or the Victorian Anglo-Jewish gentry. Many of the most esteemed families of Victorian Anglo-Jewry were associated with Lauderdale Road synagogue such as the Sassoon, Montefiore and Mocatta families. Prominent figures who attended Lauderdale Road in the nineteenth century included the sons of David Sassoon of Bombay, such as Sassoon David Sassoon, Reuben David Sasson and Arthur Sassoon. Sir Edward Sassoon, of the next generation, was president of the community. Their arrival marked the start of a growing number of members who were not by heritage Sephardi Jews from Spain and Portugal but Mizrahi Jews originally from communities across the Middle East.

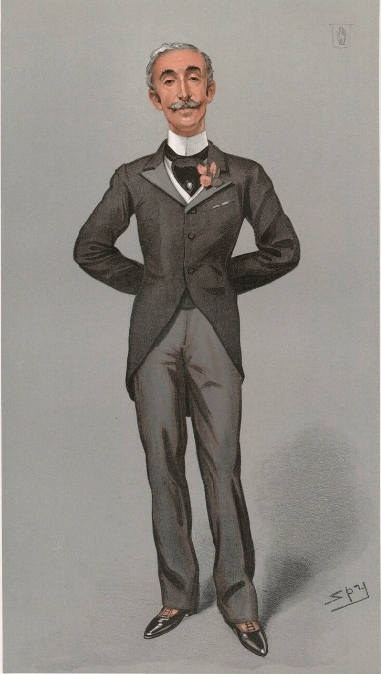
Sir Edward Sassoon was the president of the community.

=== The Jewish National Home ===
Lauderdale Road also played a key role in both the emergence of Zionism in the United Kingdom and the worldwide effort to compile Sephardi heritage. At the turn of the century the Sephardi community was led by Haham Rabbi Moses Gaster, from 1887 to 1917, who played a major role in the promotion of Zionism in the British Jewish community. The first meeting to plan the Balfour Declaration was held in the home of Haham Rabbi Gaster.

The role of senior rabbi was filled by the Sephardi scholar Rabbi Shem Tob Gaugine 1920–1953, who led a large scale ethnographic effort to compile the full diversity of Sephardi and Mizrahi customs and approach to Jewish law, compiled in the multi-volume Keter Shem Tob.

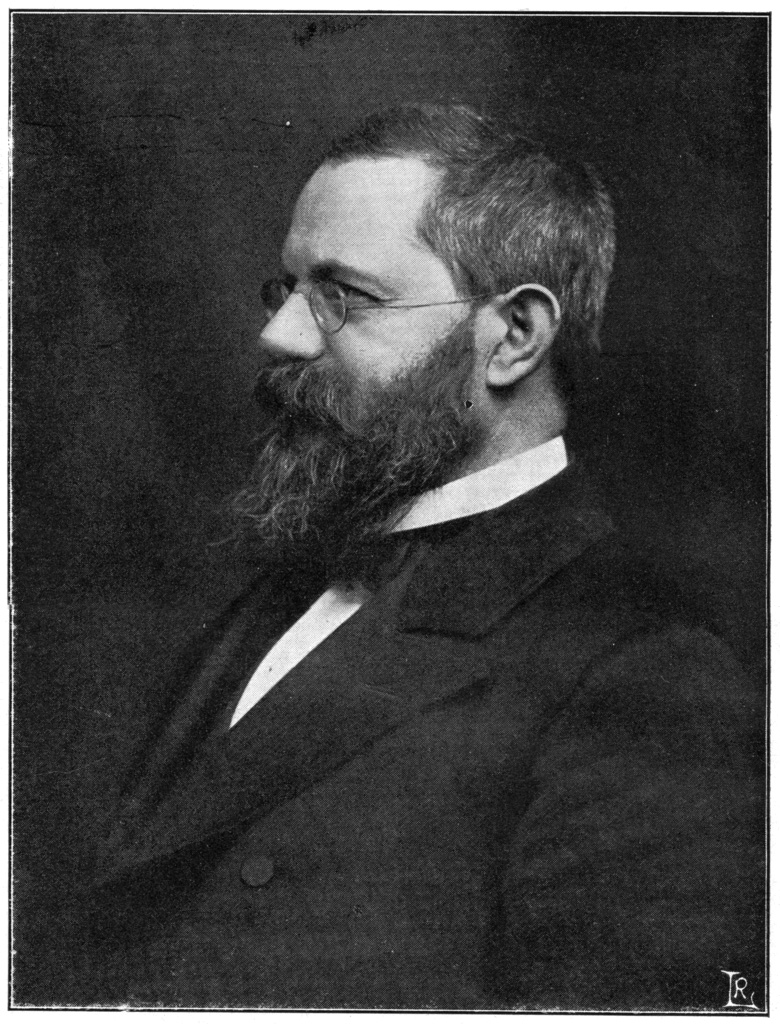
Haham Rabbi Moses Gaster, a former leader of the community

Growing prosperity continued to change the profile of the community. The orphanage, originally attached to Lauderdale Road was closed in 1940 as it was no longer necessary. Almshouses in East London were similarly disposed of. During World War Two the synagogue suffered bomb damage along with much of the surrounding area due to German air raids. Members of the community also began to enjoy political prominence at this time. Sir Philip Sassoon, who between 1924 and 1929 and again from 1931 until 1937 when he served as Under-Secretary of State for Air and in 1937 was First Commissioner of Works until his death in 1939, was a member and donor to the community. During this time another prominent member of the community Leslie Hore-Belisha served first as Minister of Transport from 1934–1937 and then as War Secretary from 1937–1940. Meanwhile, the community suffered heavy losses amongst its young men who fought in large numbers in both World Wars. However, despite its material and political successes, rising assimilation, both to the wider Ashkenazi community and British society more generally saw the still dominantly Spanish and Portuguese origin community begin to shrink in the second quarter of the twentieth century.

=== Postwar Jewish migration ===
Lauderdale Road's history in the late twentieth century was defined and revived by a new wave of Jewish migration to London. The postwar years saw the declining numbers of this historically Spanish and Portuguese Sephardi community go into reverse with the large-scale arrival into the community of Baghdadi and Iraqi Jews from Asia and the Middle East. Albert M. Hyamson, a prominent member of the community and a leading historian of Anglo-Jewry, remarked in 1951:

"By now the complexion of the Community had changed considerably. The names of the Yehidim were still for the most part Sephardi, whatever those of their mothers may have been, but the Lopezes, the Baruch Lousadas, the Gonzales, the Nunes, and others of the seventeenth and early eighteenth centuries, savouring of the peninsula, had become exceptional. Prominent in their place were not only Italian ones such as Montefiore, but also those reminiscent of oriental lands—Aloof, Abecasis, and above all Sassoon."

A leading figure in welcoming this postwar migration was Haham Rabbi Solomon Gaon, who took up the leadership of the community from 1947–1977. Gaon also served as chief rabbi to the Sephardi communities of the British Commonwealth. A programme at Montefiore College, a Jewish educational organisation associated with Lauderdale Road, welcomed young Jewish men to pursue Jewish studies in London principally from Morocco, Tunisia and Algeria as those communities emigrated en masse to Israel and France in the decades following the creation of the state of Israel, opening up the community further. Perhaps the most notable figure who partook in the programme at Montefiore College was Rabbi Israel Elia, who came to London from Djerba, Tunisia, as a young boy in 1971 to join the scheme. He later qualified as a rabbi at Jews' College London and served the Lauderdale Road community alongside Rabbi Abraham Levy and later on alongside Rabbi Joseph Dweck until his death in 2024.

Meanwhile, prominent members of the community in the twentieth century included Alan Mocatta. Nathan Saatchi, who led his family to London from Baghdad, was the father of Charles and Maurice Saatchi, and a prominent member of the community. Maurice Saatchi married his first wife Gillian Osband at Lauderdale Road. Both Charles and Maurice Saatchi have donated to the Lauderdale Road Jewish community. The writer Simon Sebag Montefiore received his Bar Mitzvah at Lauderdale Road.

== Today ==
=== A pan-Sephardi community ===
Over the course of the twentieth century the community welcomed Jewish refugee and immigrant families from across North Africa, Asia and the Middle East. Lauderdale Road is a growing community with over 600 member families. Now in the twenty-first century the community continues to welcome new families from France, Israel and the United States. Reflecting its identity as a pan-Sephardi and no longer strictly Spanish and Portuguese descended community, the congregation was renamed in 2015 as the S&P Sephardi community. Today the community has families with historic origins across the Sephardi diaspora, including Iraq, India, Iran, Morocco, Tunisia, Egypt, Syria, Lebanon and Gibraltar, and frequently hosts events, talks and religious ceremonies honouring them all.

The S&P Sephardi Community also maintains the historic Bevis Marks Synagogue and the Holland Park Synagogue. Associated with the community are its Beth Din, Sephardi Kashrut Authority, JewishChoice Elderly Care Campus, the Montefiore Endowment, alongside various cemeteries and charities. Together these form the communal and philanthropic heart of Sephardi culture in the UK. To accommodate young families a La Petite Nursery, a Jewish daycare centre for small children, opened on site.

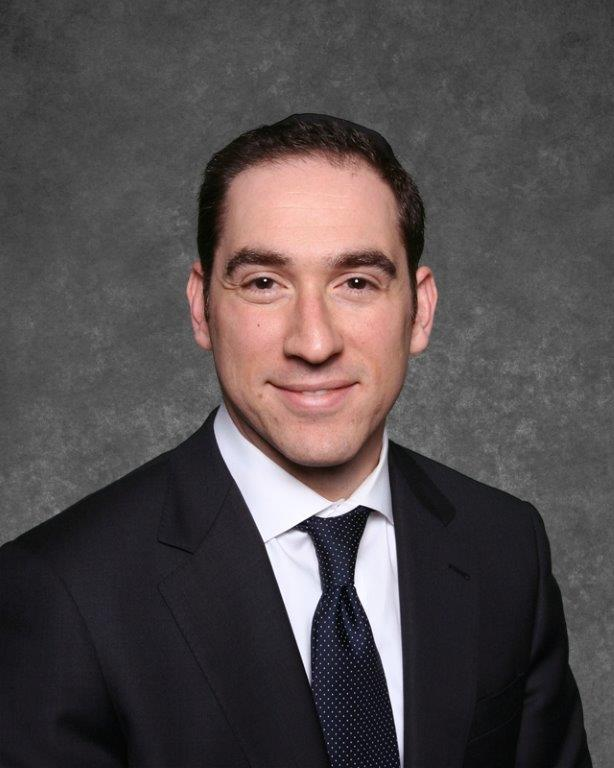
Rabbi Joseph Dweck, the community's current Senior Rabbi

From 1977 to 2012 the community was led by Rabbi Abraham Levy, a self-described moderate and "defiant centrist" in Jewish community affairs, who established the Naima Jewish Preparatory School and welcomed continued arrivals from across the Muslim world and Iraq especially. Rabbi Abraham Levy has said "the Iraqis were a rejuvenating force within our congregation."

=== A globalised community ===
Today the congregation's senior rabbi is Rabbi Joseph Dweck, originally from the United States. In reverence to its Victorian heritage, Lauderdale Road is one of very few synagogues where the rabbis and wardens continue to wear traditional top hats. According to Rabbi Abraham Levy, in his youth "many prominent members of the congregation would come to the service in white tie and tails" for the Kol Nidre service on Yom Kippur and that "tails gave way to jackets in the 1990s and now it is lounge suits." This evolving style reflects the continuing link and evolution from Lauderdale Road's history as the synagogue of the Sephardi Anglo-Jewish gentry, or "Cousinhood" as it became a globalised, pan-Sephardi community.

The Western Sephardi liturgy of the London S&P Sephardi community is considered one of the closest to the Sephardi liturgy originally in Spain. However, reflecting the pan-Sephardi identity of the community, additional parallel services are held on High Holy Days following the liturgy used by Baghdadi Jews and Iraqi Jews. This way Lauderdale Road both honours its unique role as a custodian of Spanish and Portuguese Jewish liturgy but also embraces the customs of the Jewish Middle East.

== See also ==
- History of the Jews in England
- List of Jewish communities in the United Kingdom
- List of synagogues in the United Kingdom
