= European Jewish Cemeteries Initiative =

European Jewish Cemeteries Initiative may refer to:

- Lo Tishkach European Jewish Cemeteries Initiative, a project by Conference of European Rabbis (founded in 2006)
- ESJF European Jewish Cemeteries Initiative, German-based nonprofit (founded in 2015)
