= Maryina Roshcha =

Maryina roshcha may refer to:

- Maryina Roshcha District, a district in Moscow, Russia
- Maryina Roshcha Synagogue, a synagogue in Moscow
- Maryina Roshcha (Lyublinsko-Dmitrovskaya line), a station of the Moscow Metro, Line 10
- Maryina Roshcha (Bolshaya Koltsevaya line), a prospective station of the Bolshaya Koltsevaya line
- Maryina Roshcha railway station, a station of Moscow Central Diameters Line D2
