= Joseph Dweck =

American rabbi

Rabbi Joseph Dweck
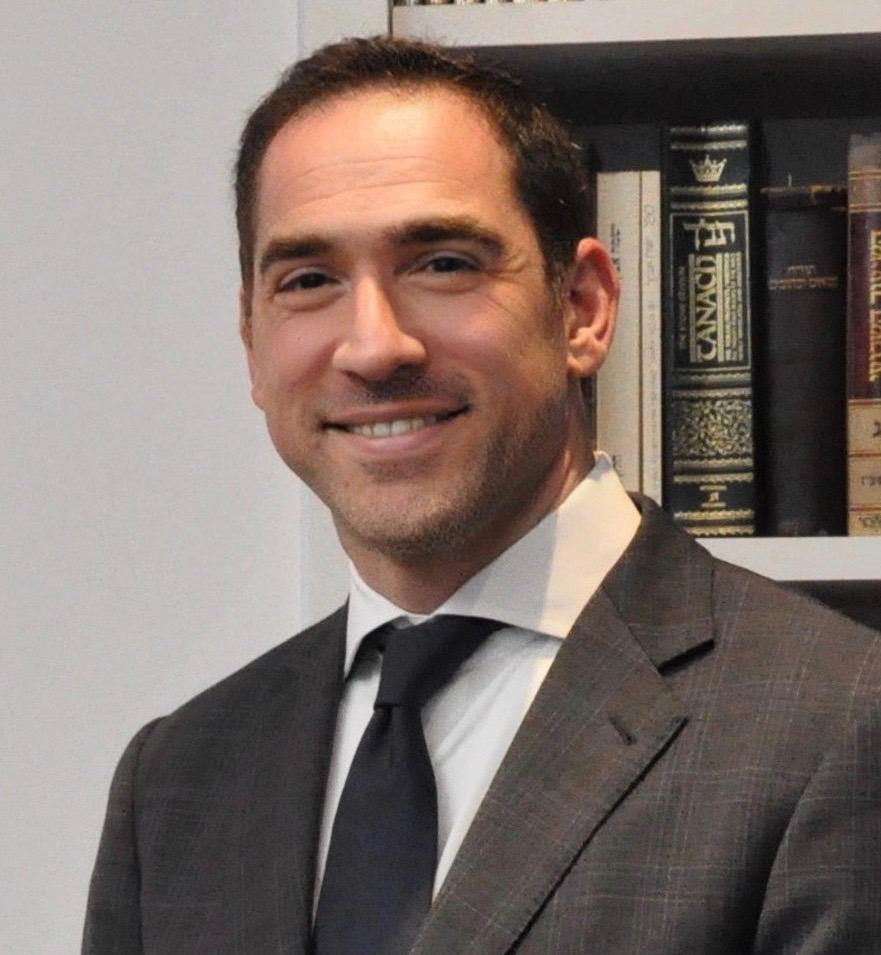
- Rabbi Dweck

Personal life
- Born: 1975 (age 50–51) Los Angeles, California
- Spouse: Margalit Dweck (née Bar-Shalom)
- Children: 5

Religious life
- Religion: Judaism
- Denomination: Sephardi

Jewish leader
- Predecessor: Rabbi Dr Abraham Levy
- Position: Senior Rabbi
- Organization: Spanish and Portuguese Jews' Congregation

Joseph Dweck (born 1975) is an American rabbi and hazzan, who served as Senior Rabbi of the Spanish and Portuguese Jewish community of the United Kingdom.

== Biography ==
Joseph Dweck was born in 1975 in Los Angeles, into a family of Syrian Jewish descent.

After finishing high school, he studied in Jerusalem at Hazon Ovadia Yeshiva under the tutelage of Sephardi Chief Rabbis of Israel Ovadia Yosef and Yitzhak Yosef. He studied psychology and philosophy at Santa Monica College in Los Angeles and received a Bachelor of Science degree in Liberal Arts from Excelsior University in Albany, New York.

In 1995 he married Margalit, daughter of Adina Bar-Shalom and granddaughter of Rav Ovadia Yosef. Rav Ovadia Yosef referred to Rabbi Dweck as his "heart's desire" and "the esteemed Rabbi who brings merit to the community" in an approbation written for Dweck's book on Jewish blessings, Birkhot Shamayim.

Rabbi Dweck received his semikha (rabbinic ordination) from Rav Ovadia Yosef under the auspices of the Sephardic Rabbinical College of Brooklyn, New York.

From 1996 to 1999, Dweck studied at the YULA Kollel in Los Angeles under Rabbi Nachum Sauer. In 1999 he moved to Brooklyn, New York to become a fellow of the newly established Sephardic Rabbinical College under the direction of Rabbi Shimon Alouf, where he studied for the next seven years and received semikha.

From 1999 to 2014, he served as rabbi of Sha'are Shalom, a Syrian synagogue in Brooklyn. From 2005 to 2008, Dweck also taught Mishna at Barkai Yeshiva in Brooklyn. He assumed the role of Hebrew Principal in 2009, and became Rosh Yeshiva in 2010, a position he held for four years.

In 2013, Rabbi Dweck was appointed Senior Rabbi of the Spanish and Portuguese Jews' Congregation of the United Kingdom, later rebranded The S&P Sephardi Community. Rabbi Dweck was elected with a 270–4 vote. On Sunday, 24 September 2014, Rabbi Dweck was officially installed as Senior Rabbi at Bevis Marks Synagogue. In his capacity as Senior Rabbi, Rabbi Dweck serves as the Deputy President of the London School of Jewish Studies; a President of The Council of Christians and Jews alongside Chief Rabbi Ephraim Mirvis, The Archbishop of Canterbury and other religious heads; and Ecclesiastical Authority of The Board of Deputies of British Jews. Rabbi Dweck also serves as a member of the Standing Committee of the Conference of European Rabbis. In 2015, he was selected by the Jewish News in conjunction with the Jewish Leadership Council as one of the top ten "young rolemodels at the forefront of British-Jewish life."

Dweck holds a Master of Arts degree in Jewish Education from Middlesex University in collaboration with the London School of Jewish Studies.

== Career ==
Hazan (Cantor)

In his earlier years, Rabbi Dweck trained as a Hazan (cantor) in Israel under famed Hazan Moshe Habusha and later in Brooklyn, NY, under Rabbi Refael Elnadav. In 1999, he joined Sha’are Shalom, a Syrian synagogue in Brooklyn, NY as their hazzan.

Community Rabbi

Shortly thereafter, he was asked to assume the position as rabbi of the congregation, a position he held for 15 years. Under his guidance, the synagogue flourished, as the original 50 members grew into over 350 families, with Rabbi Dweck deeply involved in all aspects of daily community life.

Teacher

Rabbi Dweck began his formal teaching career as a high school teacher of Jewish Law and Philosophy at Magen David Yeshiva in Brooklyn, New York where he taught for two years.

From 2005 to 2008, Rabbi Dweck taught Mishna at Barkai Yeshiva in Brooklyn, New York City. He assumed the role of Hebrew Principal in 2009, and later became Rosh Yeshiva/Head of School in 2010, a position he served for four years.

Head of School

Rabbi Dweck centred Barkai's core vision on the concept that "the Author of the Torah is the Author of the world". As such, all students were taught the five books of the Torah, establishing a comprehensive framework of thought, with secular studies taught uncompromisingly through the lens of Torah. This encompassed all aspects throughout the curriculum, including art and physical education.

Head of S&P Sephardi Community

In 2013, Rabbi Dweck was appointed Senior Rabbi of the Spanish and Portuguese Jews’ Congregation of the UK, later rebranded The S&P Sephardi Community. Rabbi Dweck was elected with a 270–4 vote, a margin believed to be the largest in UK synagogue history. On Sunday, 24 September 2014, Rabbi Dweck was officially installed as Senior Rabbi at the community's cathedral synagogue, Bevis Marks. The Jewish Chronicle reported that:

"Religious leaders from across the Anglo-Jewish spectrum, from Liberals to Lubavitch, came to celebrate the arrival of the fresh-faced new leader, aged just 39, at the community's oldest congregation. Dayanim from the Federation and United Synagogue and a large contingent from independent Sephardi communities attended, as well as Emeritus Chief Rabbi Lord Jonathan Sacks, who took part in the ceremony."

In his inaugural address Rabbi Dweck said:

"The most precious element of [The S&P's] history are the ideas and the thinking that came from my predecessors because of their commitments not only to Jewish life, observance and continuity but also because they taught our Torah within a relevant and rational framework. This trend of traditional observance, coupled with immersion in the world and society, is the crowning glory of our Sephardi tradition."

He went on to say that Judaism should be available to the community in 'High Definition’.

As Head of S&P, Rabbi Dweck's responsibilities include:

- Oversight of the religious functions of the various member synagogues
- Setting the strategic and spiritual vision for the community
- Overseeing the Sephardi Bet Din
- Spiritual Head of The Sephardi Kashrut Authority (SKA)
- Ambassador and Spokesperson for the community at various national and international forums
- Interacting with Jewish students on university campuses across the UK

Annual Scholar-In-Residence with the Sephardic Community Alliance

Despite no longer living in the United States, Rabbi Dweck has maintained a relationship with the Sephardic Community Alliance. He participates in many of their programs and is said to be an especially popular Scholar-in-Residence during their annual summer programming for the Syrian community in Deal, New Jersey.

Honorary roles

In his capacity as Senior Rabbi, Rabbi Dweck has the honor of serving as the Deputy President of the London School of Jewish Studies; a President of The Council of Christians and Jews along with the Chief Rabbi Ephraim Mirvis, The Archbishop of Canterbury and other religious heads; and Ecclesiastical Authority of The Board of Deputies of British Jews. Rabbi Dweck also serves as a member of the Standing Committee of the Conference of European Rabbis.

In 2015, the Jewish News in conjunction with the Jewish Leadership Council published '40 Under 40', listing young members of the British Jewish Community at the forefront of Jewish life, with Rabbi Dweck listed 4th among the top 10.

== Views on social issues ==
=== Comments on homosexuality ===
In May 2017, Rabbi Dweck delivered a lecture in which he presented his approach regarding the Torah view on homosexuality, declaring that Jewish law does not legislate against the feelings involved (sexual relations, he stated, are prohibited by the Torah). He suggested that contemporary developments on this issue, while problematic, are also "a fantastic development to humanity" as they force humanity to rethink the question of love, and potentially remove the stigma associated with platonic love and affection between men. He preceded his words with caveats and stated his awareness of the controversial nature of the topic, explaining that he had been thinking about it for years and felt the need to discuss it because "no one was talking about it openly in Orthodox Judaism." This lecture proved highly controversial and while some welcomed and supported it, others strongly rejected it, including Rabbi Aharon Bassous and the Beth Din of the prominent Haredi rabbi Nissim Karelitz. Rabbi Dweck issued a clarification letter explaining his Halakhic stance and intentions.

In the wake of the controversy, a rabbinic panel to question Dweck on his statements and teaching was convened, consisting of Chief Rabbi Ephraim Mirvis, Dayan Chanoch Ehrentreu (Av Beth Din of Europe), Dayan Menachem Gelly (Rosh Beth Din of the London Beth Din), and Dayan Avraham David (Rosh Beth Din of the Sephardi Beth Din). The panel concluded that Dweck could continue his role as the Senior Rabbi of the Sephardi community. The decision was supported by former Chief Rabbi Lord Jonathan Sacks.

In January 2018, Rabbi Dweck resumed his lectures with a new series at the London Jewish School of Studies, at a sold-out return to Hendon.

== See also ==
- Chief Rabbis of the British Empire and Commonwealth
- Spanish-Portuguese Jews in the United States
