= Solomon Gaon =

Sephardic rabbi

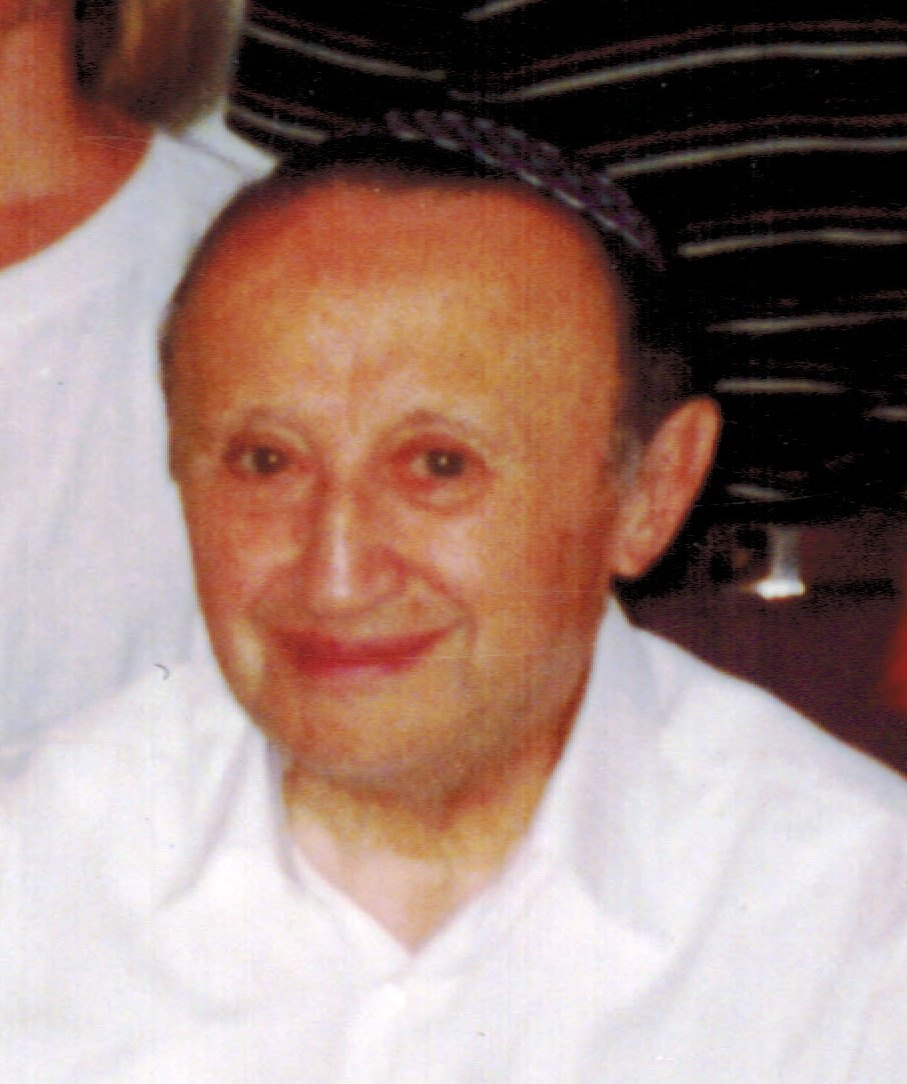
- Born: December 15, 1912; Travnik, Bosnia and Herzegovina
- Died: December 22, 1994 (aged 82); New York City, United States

Solomon Gaon (1912–1994) was a Sephardic Rabbi and Hakham of the Spanish and Portuguese Jews of the British Commonwealth.

== Biography ==
Solomon Gaon was born in Travnik, Bosnia and Herzegovina in 1912 and studied at the yeshiva in Sarajevo. Both his parents were murdered in the Holocaust. He received his rabbinic ordination from Jews' College in London. In 1949 he became Haham (Chief Rabbi) of the Sephardic congregations of the British Commonwealth. With Alan Mocatta, he is credited with revivifying a declining community. Beginning in 1963 he became involved (initially on a part-time basis) with Yeshiva University in New York, and was integral in the founding of its Sephardic Studies Program.

Rabbi Gaon's overseas activities were controversial with some members of his London congregation, and he left under difficult circumstances. A 1977 ballot on his retirement as spiritual leader drew 75-75 and was only carried by the deciding vote of the president of the Mahamad (council). His departure deepened the rift within the community. No successor as Haham has yet been elected. Rabbi Abraham Levy served as "Spiritual Head" until his retirement in 2012.

After moving to New York, Rabbi Gaon was also connected with the Spanish and Portuguese Congregation Shearith Israel. In 1968 Rabbi Gaon delivered the main address at the dedication of the first synagogue consecrated in Spain since the Expulsion of the Jews in 1492. He became a professor at Yeshiva University in 1976, and founded and directed the Jacob E. Safra Institute of Sephardic Studies. He served as president of the Union of Sephardic Congregations of the United States and Canada. He was the principal representative of the Sephardic people at the March 31, 1992 event at the Beth Yaacov synagogue in Madrid, during which King Juan Carlos of Spain revoked the 1492 Edict of Expulsion. Haham Rabbi Gaon received Spain's Prince of Asturias Award in 1992 for his lifetime of efforts seeking a renewal of relationships between and among the Sephardim and the Spanish people. In 1991, he presided when Jewish services were held for the first time in 500 years in Zaragoza, Spain.

In addition to numerous articles and sermons, Gaon authored:

- Prayer Book for Boys and Girls, 1969
- Haggadah or Order of Services for Domestic Use on the First Two Nights of Passover According to the Rite of the Spanish and Portuguese Jews' Congregation, London, 1975
- Book of Prayer of the Spanish and Portuguese Jews' Congregation, London, (ed) 1980
- Del Fuego: Sephardim and the Holocaust. (ed) with Mitchell Serels, 1987 (ISBN 978-0872031432)
- The Influence of the Catholic Theologian Alfonso Tostado on the Pentateuch Commentary of Isaac Abravanel Ktav, 1993 (ISBN 978-0881254389)
- Minhath Shelomo: A Commentary on the Book of Prayer of the Spanish & Portuguese Jews Union of Sephardic Congregations, 1990 (ISBN 978-0881253511)

== Archives ==
Gaon's personal papers are at Yeshiva University Archives in New York City.
