= Alter Hilewitz =

Hasidic author (1906–1994)

Rabbi Alter Hilewitz Ha'Levi
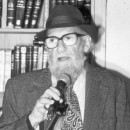

Personal life
- Born: September 1, 1906 Zembin, Borisovsky Uyezd, Minsk Governorate, Russian Empire
- Died: August 11, 1994 (aged 87) Israel
- Buried: Har HaMenuchot
- Spouse: Leah Movshovitz; Sima Cohen
- Parent: Menachem Mendel Hilewitz (father)
- Education: University of the Witwatersrand

Religious life
- Religion: Judaism
- Synagogue: Maryina Roshcha Synagogue
- Yahrtzeit: 4 Elul

Rabbi Alter Hilewitz (also spelled Hilevitz or Hilavits; Hebrew: אלתר הילביץ; September 1, 1906 – August 11, 1994) was an author of halakhic literature and an editor of Encyclopedia Talmudit and Encyclopedia Judaica. He was a prominent Chabad Hasid.

== Early life and education ==
Hilewitz was born in Zembin (now Belarus) to Rabbi Menachem Mendel Hilewitz, who served as the rabbi of the town, and was son-in-law to Rabbi Avraham "Avromke" Landau of Zembin. In his youth, he studied at Yeshiva Tomchei Tmimim of Lubavitch during the period of the Rashab. His sister Guta Beila married Chabad Mashpia Rabbi Shilem Koratin of Lubavitch and his other sister Alte married Rabbi Avraham Baruch Pewsner of Minsk and Kharkov, their children included Hillel Pewsner. Hilewitz was famously a friend to Izi Kharik, a Yiddish poet who was killed during the Great Purge.

During the October Revolution, he quit his studies at Yeshiva and returned to his home, where he studied at the Yiddish Pedagogical Technikum. In 1925, he moved to Minsk, where he met Rabbi Moshe-Zvi Neria and many other important Chabad rabbis, and studied the philosophy of Zionism. He was temporarily a student at the local university and studied in underground Chabad yeshivas in Russia. He was arrested five times by Soviet authorities for practicing his religion. He was considered by some to be a Marxist and recruited members for the Communist Youth Union.

== Career ==
He moved to Moscow in 1933 and worked at the Russian State Library and later for the city itself. Concurrently, he served as rabbi at Maryina Roshcha Synagogue. He attempted to obtain permission to exit the USSR, but was refused on eleven separate occasions, including after three meetings with Mikhail Kalinin.

In 1936, Hilewitz immigrated to Eretz Yisroel and married Leah Movshovitz, daughter of Rabbi Mordechai Shlomo Movshovitz, Rabbi of Malastovka. She died a few years into their marriage, and he remarried to Sima Cohen, daughter of Rabbi Israel Dov Cohen, rabbi of Mount Carmel. They settled in Haifa and he taught at Yeshiva Tifereth Israel. In 1944, at the request of Meir Bar-Ilan, he moved to Jerusalem, where he joined a team of rabbis editing the Encyclopedia Talmudit with Shlomo Yosef Zevin.

In 1951, he traveled on a mission to Johannesburg where he promoted Jewish education, directing a seminary for rabbis and a Midrasha. He served as a rabbi and posek for the town. During his time in South Africa, he received a doctorate in philosophy from the University of the Witwatersrand. His thesis was a treatise on "Military Laws and Especially on the Connection to the Hasmoneans, the Revolt and the Family". He returned to Jerusalem in 1975 and was a leader of the Beit Midrash Me'eretz in Mevaseret Zion.

== Personal life ==
Hilewitz had four children: Menachem Hilewitz, Nechama Hilewitz (who married Londoner Alan Unterman, later a rabbi in South Manchester), Yehudah, and Hadassah. He died on August 11, 1994, and was buried in Har HaMenuchot in Jerusalem.

== Selected works ==
- Hilavits, Alter (1950). ללשונות הרמב״ם : מחקרים ובירורים (in Hebrew). Jerusalem: Mosad ha-Rav Ḳuḳ. OCLC 19158312.
- Hilavits, Alter (1976). חקרי זמנים: מחקרים ובירורים בזמני השנה בהלכה ומנהג לאור המקורות (in Hebrew). מוסד הרב קוק.
- Hilavits, Alter (1990). חקרי זמנים: מחקרים ובירורים בסוגיות התלמודים וברמב״ם מסודרים לפי זמני השנה עם פרקי רמב״ם (in Hebrew). Ḳol ha-mevaśer.
