= Rabbinical Center of Europe =

Rabbinical authority for Europe

- Formation: 2000; 26 years ago
- Founder: Gershon Mendel Garelik (among others)
- Legal status: Non-profit foundation
- Headquarters: Brussels, Belgium
- Secretary General: Menachem Margolin
- Website: www.rce.eu.com

The Rabbinical Center of Europe (RCE) is an international rabbinical organization for Europe, which encompasses more than 1,000 community rabbis from across the continent.

The organization is headquartered in Brussels, Belgium, and maintains a satellite office in Jerusalem. It is led by the Secretary General, Menachem Margolin.

== History ==
Increasing tensions and religious disputes between various Chabad rabbis and shluchim led to the creation of the organization, which sought to create a better organized authority for European Chabad Jewry. Among the founders of the organization are Gershon Mendel Garelik, Hillel Pewsner, Berel Lazar, Azriel Chaikin, and David Moshe Lieberman, rabbis leading various communities across Europe. The organization was created to compete with the Conference of European Rabbis, although there is large overlap between membership and reach of the two.

== Mission and activities ==
The organization's purpose is to convene in rabbinical gatherings, overseeing historic cemeteries, and assisting in building mikvehs and being an authority for maintaining and assessing Jewish resources across the European continent. There are annual conferences for rabbis to convene, and ones held that deal with issues of kashrut and are attended by delegations from across Europe, as well as a delegation of the Chief Rabbinate of Israel, in which one of the Chief Rabbis attends.

The organization maintains contact with various governments in Europe to promote Jewish religious interests for the Jewish populations of those countries, and many delegations have met with diplomats, prime ministers, and presidents.

The organization occasionally gives out humanitarian awards, including to then-President of the European Commission Romano Prodi in 2004. The RCE has also engaged in activism to defend circumcision, having been vocal during attempts to ban the practice in Germany. They additionally have protested against the banning of ritual slaughter necessary for the koshering of meat, as was done in Denmark in 2014.

In 2006, the organization announced a major project to establish 25 mikvehs across Europe with a budget of €1,500,000. The project concluded six years later, and it was announced that another 25 would be established by the end of 2008. Since the 2000s, more projects have been planned and coordinated for mikvehs including a 2013 proposal to build another 30.

In 2023, the organization was widely criticized by activists and other organizations for its refusal to recognize the Armenian Genocide. In a response to the criticism by Armenian organizations, the Center criticized their use of rhetoric labelling The Republic of Artsakh as a "ghetto," stating "belittling the extent of the Jewish people’s suffering to further any political interest through incessantly using phrases associated with the Holocaust suffered by the Jewish people."
