= History of the Jews in Moscow =

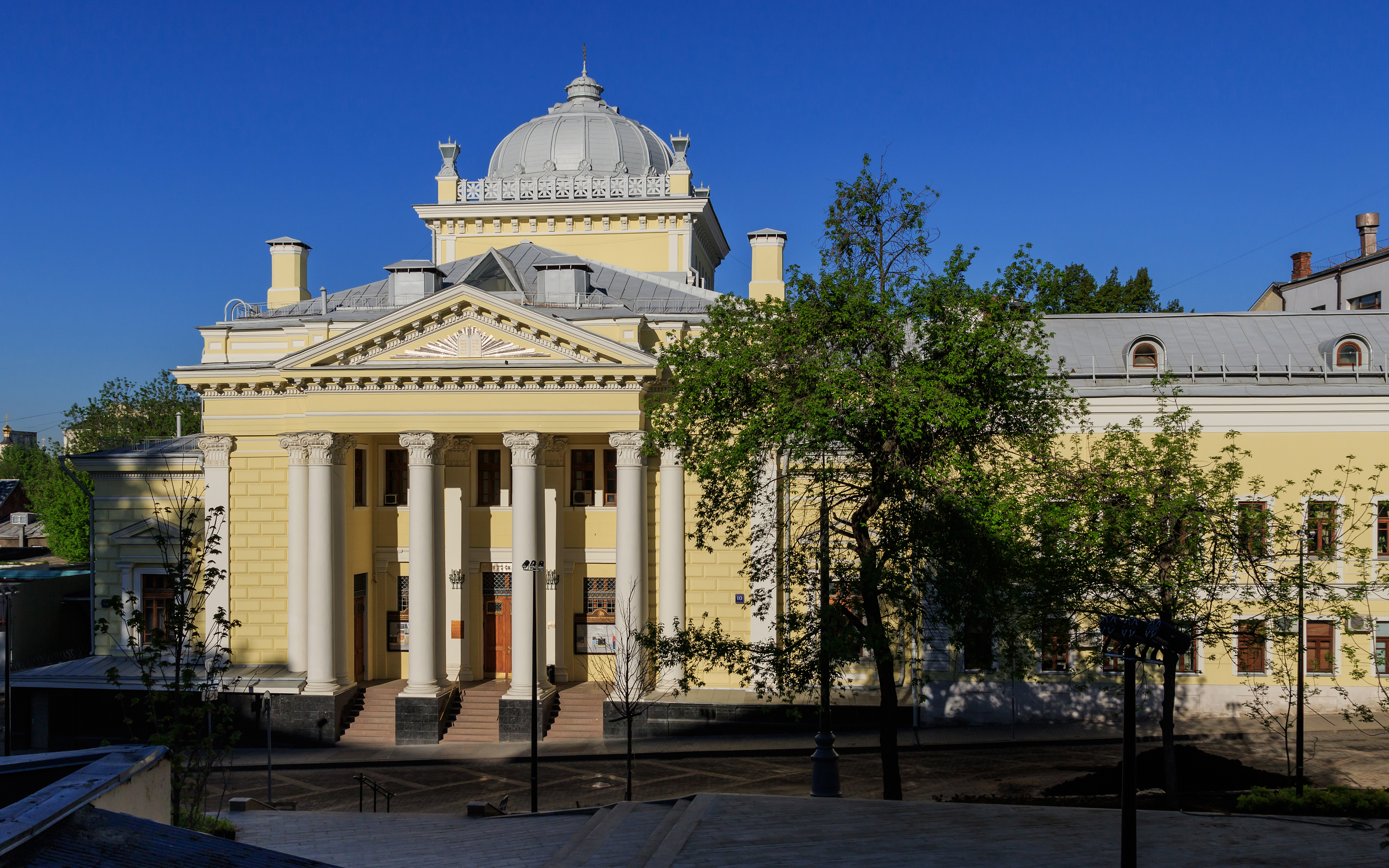
Moscow Choral Synagogue

The history of the Jews in Moscow goes back to the 17th century, although the city did not become an important Jewish center until the late 19th century when more Jews were legally allowed to settle. Prior to the 19th century, Jews had arrived in the city as prisoners of the Russo-Polish war or after 1790, as merchants allowed one month stays. In the late 1800s, the Jewish population boomed, and then dramatically dropped after the 1891 expulsion of Jews from the city. The population grew once again following World War I, and was a Jewish and Zionist cultural center until the end of the revolution, after which it became a Soviet Jewish center for a period of time. The Moscow Jewish community experienced a number of highs and lows under the Soviet Union as Jewish identity became increasingly taboo in the eyes of the government. After the collapse of the Soviet government and the mass migration of a huge portion of Russian Jews from the country, Moscow has still maintained a sizable Jewish population.

== Imperial Russia ==
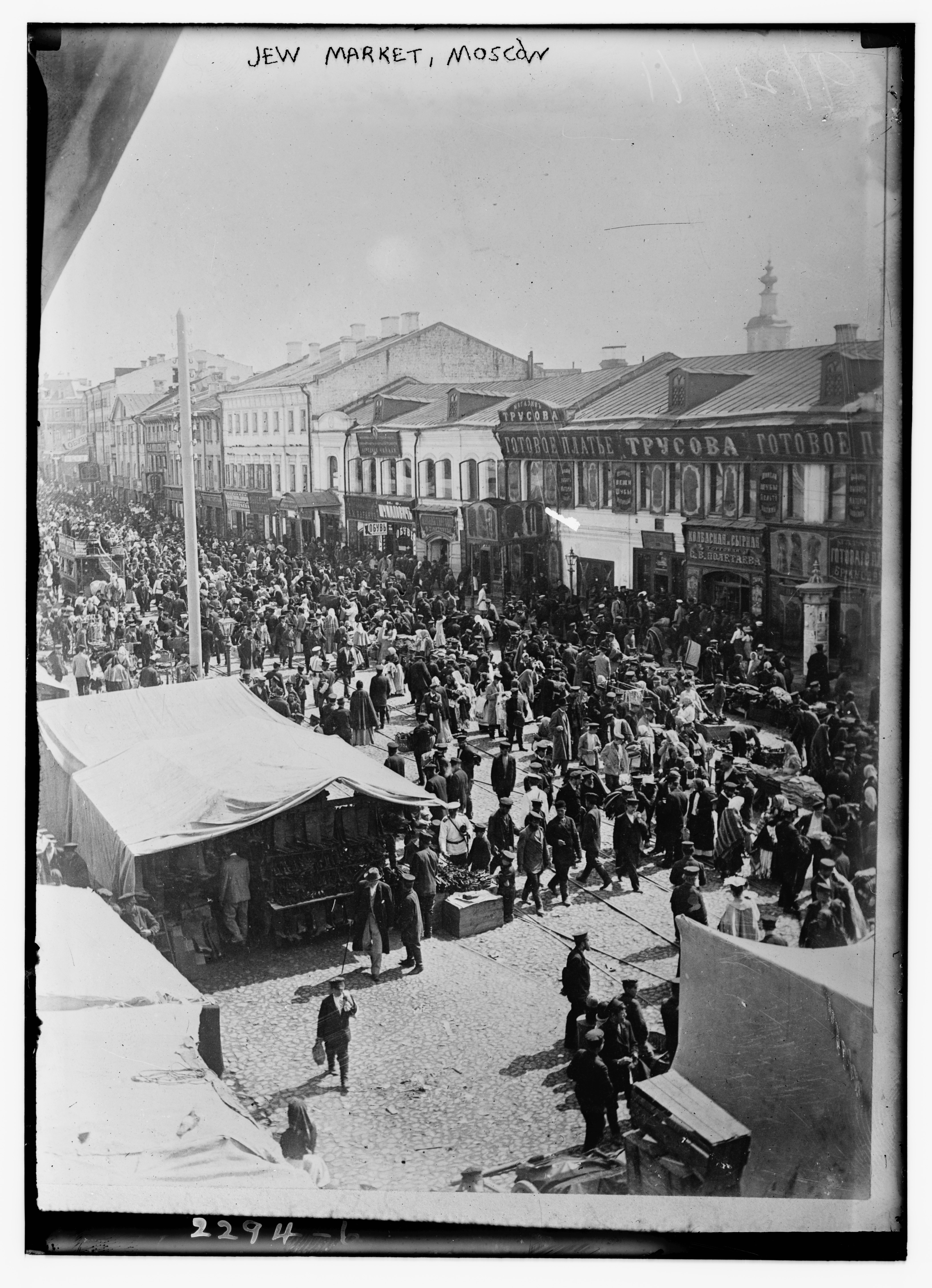
Jewish Market in Moscow, 1911

From the beginning of the 16th century to the middle of the 17th century, Jews were excluded from Moscow in Russia on account of religious enmity toward them. Conditions underwent a change in the reign of Catherine II. With the separation of White Russia from Lithuania and its addition to Russia proper (1772), the numerous Jewish populations of White Russia came under Russian rule. They were the first Russo-Jewish subjects. Jewish merchants from White Russia, particularly from the town of Shklov, began to arrive to Moscow, but they remained only for short periods. With the further addition to Russia of Polish territories, Jews from other governments came to Moscow. All these temporary visitors were permitted to stay only in a particular inn, Glebovskoye Podvoriye, also known as the "Jewish Inn." Since the inn was the only place at which these Jews could stay, the prices were extremely high.

Beginning with the second decade of the 19th century the Jewish population of Moscow began to increase. From the year 1827, during the reign of Nicholas I, the Jews were compelled to serve for 25 years in the army. Many such Jewish soldiers were sent to Moscow." Most of the first Jews to settle in Moscow were these cantonists, Jews that had been conscripted to the army as children, and were now done with their military service. Some of them had married Jewish women from the Pale of Settlement, where the vast majority of Jews were stricted to living. In 1858, the Jewish population in the District of Moscow was 340 men and 104 women. During the rule of Tsar Alexander II, Jews who met certain criteria were allowed to live in the city. These were: Jews who had university degrees, completed military service, or were pharmacists, dentists, midwives, or first-guild merchants. As the Jewish population increased, many Jews who came did not fit the criteria and were illegal and unregistered. Liberal city administrators at the time largely looked the other way. In 1871, the Jewish population was about 8,000. In this time, the foundations of the community were laid, including the creation of the first Jewish cemetery in 1860s and the opening of a Jewish school and first formal synagogue in 1871.

When Alexander III became Tsar in 1881, he took more hardline stances on Jews in Russia. By this point, in 1882, the Jewish population of the city had boomed to 12,000-16,000 of whom the majority were not registered legally. Jews were contributing greatly to the economy, and owned 29.3 percent of the capital declared by first-guild merchants, and were some of the most important bankers and entrepreneurs. With this success, however, came unease from some Russians at the new Jewish influence in the city, and the community now numbered 35,000 in 1890 (3% of the total population).

When Grand Duke Sergei Alexandrovich became Governor General of Moscow in 1891, he named one of his goals as being “to save Moscow from the Jews.” On March 28th 1891, which was also the Eve of Passover a law was passed which prohibited Jewish craftsmen from living in Moscow and prohibited the from entering Moscow. Immediately after the law went out the police began to forcibly evict thousands of thousands of families, including some who had lived in Moscow for decades or even their entire lives. Those evicted were given 3 months to a year to dispose of their property, forcing many to sell their property at below market rates. Those who were too poor to leave the city were transported to the Pale of Settlement in the same conditions as criminals. On October 15th the right to live in Moscow was revoked from Cantonists and their descendants, and those not registered with the community where expelled. The Expulsion reached its peak in the Winter of 1892, while Russian police hunted down Jews and kicked them out of the city they also offered large rewards for any who seized any Jews still hiding. In addition to expelling these classes of people the Russian police also abused and expelled Jews of other social classes. The press was barred from reporting on the expulsions, though news of them did reach the outside world. An appeal to the government made by merchants and industrialists warning that the expulsion would severely harm the economy, though the expulsion continued.

The police estimated that about 30,000 Jews had been expelled with about 5,000 remaining in Moscow; these 5,000 were made up of the families of some Cantonists, wealthy merchants and their servants, and those who worked in "liberal professions". In addition thousands of Jews where impoverished, and hundreds converted to Christianity in order to stay in Moscow. The newly-built Choral Synagogue, opened a year prior, was ordered closed in addition to eight other synagogues of the fourteen in the city. In 1897, the Jewish population was 8,095, less than a quarter of what it was prior to the expulsion.

The American government sent a commission to Moscow to investigate what the reports they had heard of the expulsion, once there the Russian authorities showed them pictures of Jews who had been expelled and brought them to Moscow, where they subsequently investigated and confirmed the reports, and the information they gathered was then published by congress in 1892. A Jewish-American banker named Joseph Seligman sent an appeal to the Holy See asking them to intercede on the Jews behalf though this was no use.

Some of the Jews who were expelled from Moscow resettled "without permission" in nearby suburbs, but in fall of 1892 the Russian government began expelling those jews who were not registered with the community, which largely affected the new arrivals. But in 1893 Russian commercial and industrial enterprises intervened to limit the scale of this expulsion.

World War I caused a wave of Jewish migration to Moscow, and helped revive to Jewish community to a state of flourishing once again. Additionally, for years, more Jewish students had been coming to the city to study in university. A number of the newly settled Jews also took part in the war industry, and amassed small fortunes. Moscow became a center of Jewish and Zionist culture, and Jewish and Hebrew printing presses, theater, and social and political causes thrived.

== Post-Revolution and the Soviet Union ==
- Historical ethnic composition of Moscow
Ethnic group	1897^{a}	1939	1959	1970	1979	1989	2002
Russians	987,044	3,614,430	4,507,899	6,301,247	7,146,682	7,963,246	8,808,009
Ukrainians	4,478	90,479	115,489	184,885	206,875	252,670	253,644
Tatars	4,288	57,687	80,489	109,252	131,328	157,376	166,083
Armenians	1,604	13,682	18,379	25,584	31,414	43,989	124,425
Azerbaijanis		677	2,528	9,563	7,967	20,727	95,563
Jews	5,070	250,181	239,246	251,350	222,900	174,728	79,359
Belarusians	1,016	24,952	34,370	50,257	59,193	73,005	59,353
Georgians		4,251	6,365	4,195	12,180	19,608	54,387
TOTAL	1,038,591	4,137,018		7,061,008	7,931,602	8,875,579	10,382,754
- ^a By native language

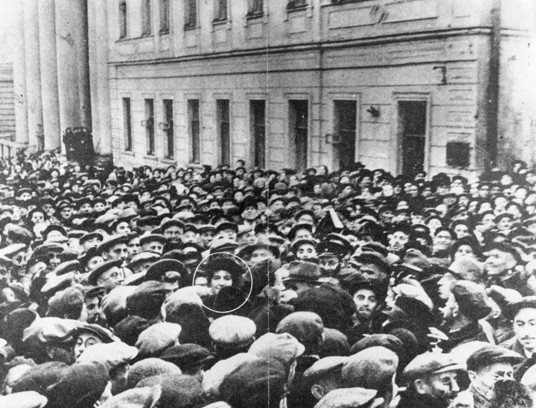
Israeli ambassador to the Soviet Union Golda Meir surrounded by crowd of 50,000 Jews near the Synagogue on the first day of Rosh Hashanah in 1948.

While Hebrew cultural activities continued throughout the revolution, when the fighting was over the new Soviet regime shut down most such cultural institutions in the years immediately following, with the notable exception of Habimah Theater. At the same time Zionist activities were heavily depressed, in the 1920s through the mid 1930s Moscow was the center of Soviet Jewish culture and social activity. The Jewish section of the Soviet Communist Party, Yevsektsiya was headquartered in Moscow, and published the daily Yiddish newspaper, "Der Emes" (the truth) from 1920 to 1938. There was also Jewish state theater and state Yiddish theater in the city in this time period. After the population deflated during the civil war, it rapidly increased—going from 28,000 in 1920 to 86,000 in 1923 to 131,000 by 1926 (6.5% of the total population of the city).

The cultural boom ended in the mid 1930s, following the implementation of a new state anti-religious campaign beginning in 1929. By 1936, the last Jewish school had been shuttered and by 1937 and 1938 most Yiddish schools and cultural institutions had closed as well. The Great Purge also swept up a number of Jewish Moscow elite and lead to their arrest.

In 1940, the Jewish population of the city was estimated to be 400,000.

During World War II, the Jewish Anti-Fascist Committee set up operations in Moscow in 1943. The committee gather major Soviet Jewish figures to help in the Soviet war effort against Nazi Germany and try to mobilize world Jewry around the cause, both in opinion and aid, and they published the Eynikayt newspaper. After the war, a number of the main committee members were arrested on trumped-up false charges on Stalin’s orders, and 10 people were ultimately executed.

Post-war, Stalin embarked on a number of anti-Semitic campaigns and plots. Many of these directly impacted the Moscow Jewish community, and numerous Moscow Jews were fired from universities, hospitals, the press, and the government or arrested and even executed as a result of false charges by Stalin and the government in the last years of his life. One particular motivation for Stalin was the Jewish reaction to Golda Meir's visit to Moscow in 1948 as the first diplomatic representative of the State of Israel. A spontaneous mass gathering in her honor occurred near the Choral Synagogue during her visit on Rosh Hashanah, to Stalin's displeasure. Afterwards, there were a number of efforts to stomp out Jewish culture and feeling and spur anti-Semitism in the Soviet bloc.

While the census of 1959 showed 239,246 Jews (4.7% of the population) registered in the municipal area of Moscow, many think this number to be massive underestimate, and some speculate that Moscow's Jewish population at that time was as high as 500,000.

In the 1950s and 60s, the Choral Synagogue was given permission to distribute the Jewish calendar to other synagogues in the Soviet Union. Starting from 1961, a separation was erected and enforced in the Choral Synagogue to keep foreign visitors, as well as Israeli diplomats, from interacting with the local congregation. In 1962, matzo baking and distribution was restricted in Moscow and large swaths of the Soviet Union. The Moscow Jewish Dramatic Ensemble was established in 1962, and began drawing large crowds performing Yiddish folklore plays, such as those of Sholem Aleichem.

Following the Six-Day War in Israel, a number of Jews applied to emigrate from the Soviet Union to the Jewish State and a large number were denied, known as refusniks. Meanwhile, Jewish nationalist groups gained traction while working underground in an atmosphere of repression. They protested, published samizdat, had seminars on Jewish history, and started Hebrew ulpans. Some of these activists, such as Natan Sharansky, Yosef Begun, and Ida Nudel were arrested as a result.

During Glasnost and Perestroika, Jewish life in Moscow expanded and new cultural organizations formed. At the same time, anti-semitic organizations grew louder and there were rumors that a pogrom could occur during the Moscow celebrations of the millennium of Christianity in Russia. In 1992, firebombs were thrown at the Maryina Roshcha Synagogue in Moscow, and in 1999 there was a failed bomb attack on the Bolshaya Bronnaya Synagogue in the city.

== After Soviet collapse and today ==
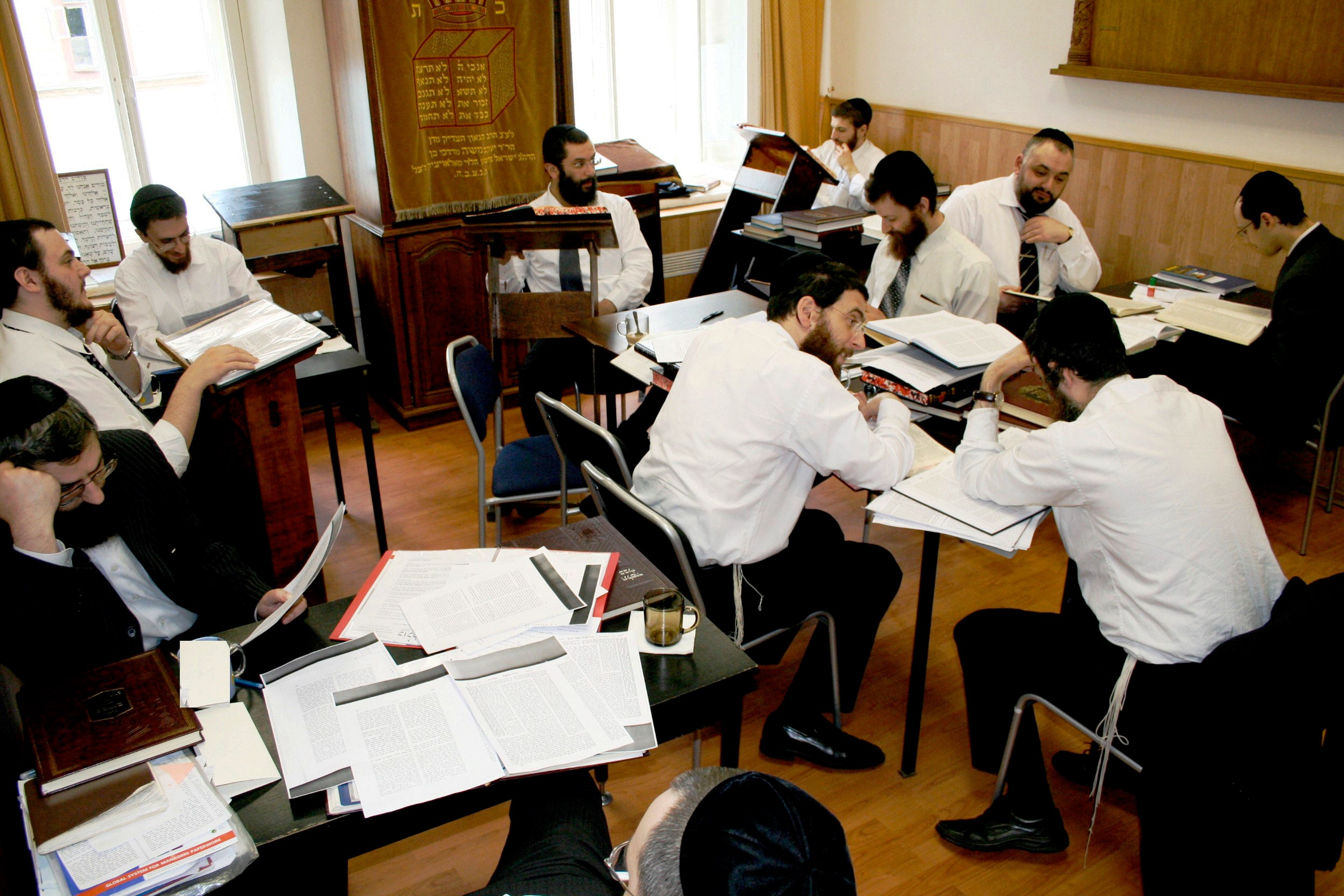
Kollel Birkat Yitzhak in Moscow in 2008

While a significant portion of Jews left the Soviet Union in the late 1980s and the 1990s for Israel and the United States, the Moscow Jewish community remains large. More religious institutions, schools, and synagogues have opened in Moscow since the dissolution of the Soviet Union. The Jewish population of Moscow has also been buoyed by the Jews moving from other Soviet provinces and states to Moscow. The 2002 census showed 148,000 Jews living in Moscow, making it the largest Jewish community in Russia.

== See also ==
- Ethnic groups in Moscow
