= Gershon Mendel Garelik =

Chabad rabbi (1932–2021)

Rabbi Gershon Mendel Garelik (14 May 1932 – 13 February 2021) was a Chabad rabbi in Milan, Italy for more than 60 years. He was also head of Chabad institutions in Italy. He was also an active Beit Din head in that city. He was active in the Rabbinical Center of Europe and was chairman of that organisation's executive committee. He previously served as chairman of the RCE.

== Life ==
Rabbi Garelik was born in the city of Yalta in Russia. His parents were Chaim Meir and Rivka Garelik.

He learned in the underground Yeshivot (because learning religion was forbidden during the soviet rule) in Russia. In 1947 his family escaped Russia, first they were in the DP camps in Germany until they finally moved to Israel.

In Israel he learnt in the Chabad Yeshivot there under Rebbi Shlomo Chaim Kesselman. in that period of time he also helped the Yemenites settle in Israel, with Torah education saving them from the Christian missionaries.

For the 1956 school year he went to the Central Lubavitch Yeshiva in 770. There he received Semicha.

In the summer of 1958 he married Basya (Posner). The wedding took place in the courtyard of 770 and the Lubavitcher Rebbe was Mesader Kiddushin.

During a visit to New York in 1971 his plane was delayed and walked 10 miles from John F. Kennedy Airport to Crown Heights, Brooklyn to avoid riding in a car on the Shabbat.
