= Shem Tob Gaguine =

British rabbi (1884–1953)

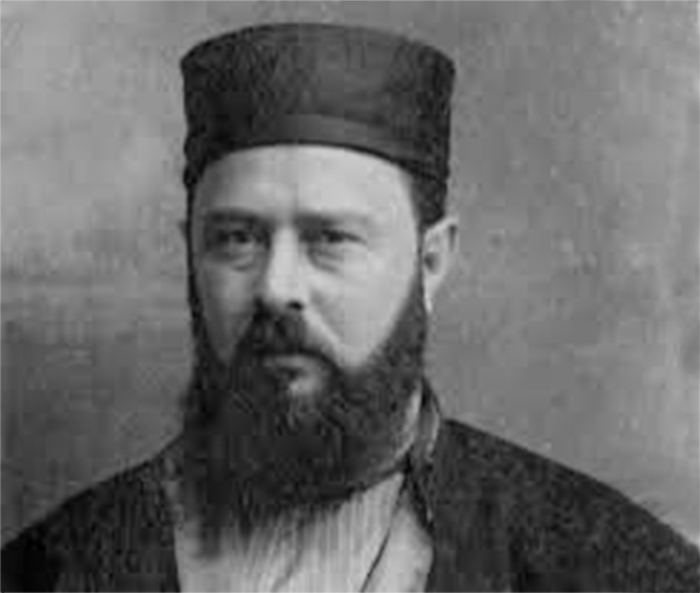

Personal life
- Born: 5 September 1884 Jerusalem, Ottoman Empire
- Died: 30 July 1953 (aged 68) Manchester, United Kingdom

Religious life
- Religion: Judaism

Shemtob Gaguin(e) (5 September 1884 – 30 July 1953) was a Sephardic rabbi and scion of a famous Moroccan rabbinical dynasty which emigrated to Palestine from Spain at the time of the Inquisition.

== Biography ==
He was the great-grandson of R. Chaim Abraham Gagin, the first Hakham Bashi of the Holy Land during the Ottoman Empire, and the son and nephew respectively of Rabbis Isaac and Abraham Gaguin. He was the great-great-grandson of the famous scholar and kabbalist, Sar Shalom Sharabi.

He studied at the "Doresh Zion" College, Jerusalem and was a pupil of R. Jacob Alfiya. At an early age, he contributed articles to the Palestinian Hebrew Press (Hahhabbezeleth et al.) on aspects of Jewish traditional observances, as well as on biblical and philological matters. He was awarded rabbinical diplomas by numerous authorities, including R. Haim Berlin and Chief Rabbis Jacob Meir, C.B.E. and Abraham Kook, C.B.E. of Palestine. In 1911, Rabbi Gaguine was appointed to serve in the office of dayyanut in Cairo. In 1919, he was invited to serve In Manchester, being appointed Ab Beth Din 1n 1920. In 1927 he was appointed Rosh Yeshibah of Judith Montefiore College in Ramsgate. He was also served as a Senior Rabbi to Lauderdale Road synagogue in Maida Vale of the Spanish and Portuguese Jews Congregation of London.

His son, Rabbi Dr. Maurice Gaguine, served as rabbi of the Withington Congregation of Spanish and Portuguese Jews.

== Positions held ==
- Dayan of the Beth Din of the autonomous Jewish Community of Egypt from 1911 to 1919.
- Senior Rabbi of the Sephardi Congregation of Withington, Manchester, 1919–1926.
- Dayan of the Manchester Beth Din, 1920–1926.
- Appointed Ecclesiastical Chief (Haham) and Ab Beth Din of the Spanish and Portuguese Jews in England in 1920.
- Principal (Rosh Yeshivah) of the Judith Montefiore Theological College, Ramsgate, from 1927.
- Appointed by Act of Parliament in 1934 as Vice President of the Rabbinical Commission for the Licensing of Shochatim in Great Britain.
- Head of the Sephardi Medrash "Heshaim" in London from 1935.

== Published works ==
His major contribution to Jewish scholarship was Keter Shem Tob, an encyclopaedic treatise which examines and compares the rites, ceremonies and liturgy of the eastern and western Sephardim and Ashkenazim, paying particular attention to the customs of Spanish and Portuguese Jews. The first two volumes were published in 1934. The final work comprised a total of 7 volumes, the last 4 of which were published posthumously with the help of his son, Rabbi Dr. Maurice Gaguine. In 1998 "Keter Shem Tob" was republished as a complete set.

His other works were:

- Pirke Shirah, 1937 (poems and special prayers)
- Jews of Cochin, 1953
- Various articles on talmudic, theological and legal subjects in the Jewish Chronicle, Jewish Guardian, Jewish World, World Jewry, Jewish Tribune (India), Israel’s Messenger (China), Rosh Hashana Annual (South Africa) etc.
- Shulhan Aruch, a critical study based on several old editions and unpublished manuscripts.
- Six Responsa
- Sermons
- Rambles in Spain, synagogal inscriptions and local Jewish customs.
- Various commentaries on Midrash Rabbah and Midrash Tanchuma.

A significant bulk of his responsa, sermons, and other works was never published, and they remain in manuscript or lost.

He was also the editor of "Yehudith" (organ of the Montefiore College).

(For further information, see Jewish Encyclopedia, Encyclopaedia Judaica and Ozar Israel.)
