= Ethnic groups in Moscow =

- Historical ethnic composition of Moscow
Ethnic group	1897^{a}	1939	1959	1970	1979	1989	2002
Russians	987,044	3,614,430	4,507,899	6,301,247	7,146,682	7,963,246	8,808,009
Ukrainians	4,478	90,479	115,489	184,885	206,875	252,670	253,644
Tatars	4,288	57,687	80,489	109,252	131,328	157,376	166,083
Armenians	1,604	13,682	18,379	25,584	31,414	43,989	124,425
Azerbaijanis		677	2,528	9,563	7,967	20,727	95,563
Jews	5,070	250,181	239,246	251,350	222,900	174,728	79,359
Belarusians	1,016	24,952	34,370	50,257	59,193	73,005	59,353
Georgians		4,251	6,365	4,195	12,180	19,608	54,387
TOTAL	1,038,591	4,137,018		7,061,008	7,931,602	8,875,579	10,382,754
- ^a By native language

Moscow is the most populous city in Europe and Russia, the population of which is mostly made up of ethnic Russians, but it also hosts a significant population of ethnic minorities. The last census of 2021 reported 69.7% of the population was Russian.

== Statistics ==
According to the 2010 Russian census, more than 20 ethnic groups resided in Moscow. As of 2021, Russians made up 69.7% of population (90.2% among those who declared their ethnicity during the survey).

Ethnicity	Year																			
Ethnicity	1897 (Note: Taken from language of respondents)		1939		1959		1970		1979		1989		2002		2010			2021		
Ethnicity	Number	%	Number	%	Number	%	Number	%	Number	%	Number	%	Number	%	Population	%	% of ethnicity declared	Population	%	% of ethnicity declared
Russians	987,044	95.0%	3,614,430	87.4%	4,507,899	88.6%	6,301,247	89.2%	7,146,682	90.1%	7,963,246	89.7%	8,808,009	84.8%	9,930,410	86.3%	91.6%	9,074,375	69.7%	90.2%
Tatars	4,288	0.1%	57,687	1.4%	80,489	1.6%	109,252	1.5%	131,328	1.7%	157,376	1.8%	166,083	1.6%	149,043	1.3%	1.4%	84,373	0.6%	0.8%
Armenians	1,604	0.1%	13,682	0.3%	18,379	0.4%	25,584	0.4%	31,414	0.4%	43,989	0.5%	124,425	1.2%	106,466	0.9%	1.0%	68,018	0.5%	0.7%
Ukrainians	4,478	0.4%	90,479	2.2%	115,489	2.3%	184,885	2.6%	206,875	2.6%	252,670	2.8%	253,644	2.4%	154,104	1.3%	1.4%	58,788	0.5%	0.6%
Azerbaijanis	–	–	677	–	2,528	–	4,889	–	7,967	0.1%	20,727	0.2%	95,563	0.9%	57,123	0.5%	0.5%	37,259	0.3%	0.4%
Uzbeks	–	–	659	–	2,478	–	5,973	–	4,222	–	9,183	0.1%	9,183	0.1%	35,595	0.3%	0.3%	29,526	0.2%	0.3%
Jews	5,070	0.4%	250,181	6.0%	239,246	4.7%	251,350	3.6%	222,900	2.8%	174,728	2.0%	79,359	0.8%	53,145	0.5%	0.5%	28,014	0.2%	0.3%
Georgians	–	–	4,251	0.1%	6,365	0.1%	9,563	0.1%	12,180	0.2%	19,608	0.2%	54,387	0.5%	38,934	0.3%	0.4%	26,222	0.2%	0.3%
Tajiks	–	–	184	–	1,005	–	1,652	–	1,221	–	2,893	–	35,385	0.4%	27,280	0.2%	0.2%	22,783	0.2%	0.2%
Belarusians	1,016	–	24,952	0.6%	34,370	0.7%	50,257	0.7%	59,193	0.7%	73,005	0.8%	59,353	0.6%	39,225	0.3%	0.4%	17,632	0.1%	0.2%
Kyrgyz	–	–	77	–	–	–	–	–	1,173	–	3,044	–	4,102	–	18,736	0.2%	0.2%	16,858	0.1%	0.2%
Others	–	–			76,173										225,031	2.0%	2.1%	595,543	4.6%	5.9%
No ethnicity declared	–	–													668,409	5.8%	–	2,950,721	22.7%	–
Total	1,038,591	100%	4,137,018	100%	5,085,581	100%	7,061,008	100%	7,931,602	100%	8,875,579	100%	10,382,754	100%	11,503,501	100%	100% (10,835,092)	13,010,112	100%	100% (10,059,391)

Notes

- 668,409 people were registered from administrative databases, and could not declare an ethnicity. It is estimated that the proportion of ethnicities in this group is the same as that of the declared group.

== Largest minorities ==
=== Caucasians ===
The term Caucasus refers to a geographical area in the South of Russia and beyond. The Caucasus itself is diverse in terms of religion, language and culture.

In modern Russia, "Caucasians" (кавказцы, kavkaztsy) is an umbrella term for people from Armenia, Azerbaijan, Georgia and Northern Caucasus: Chechnya, Dagestan, Northern Ossetia, etc.

==== Armenians ====
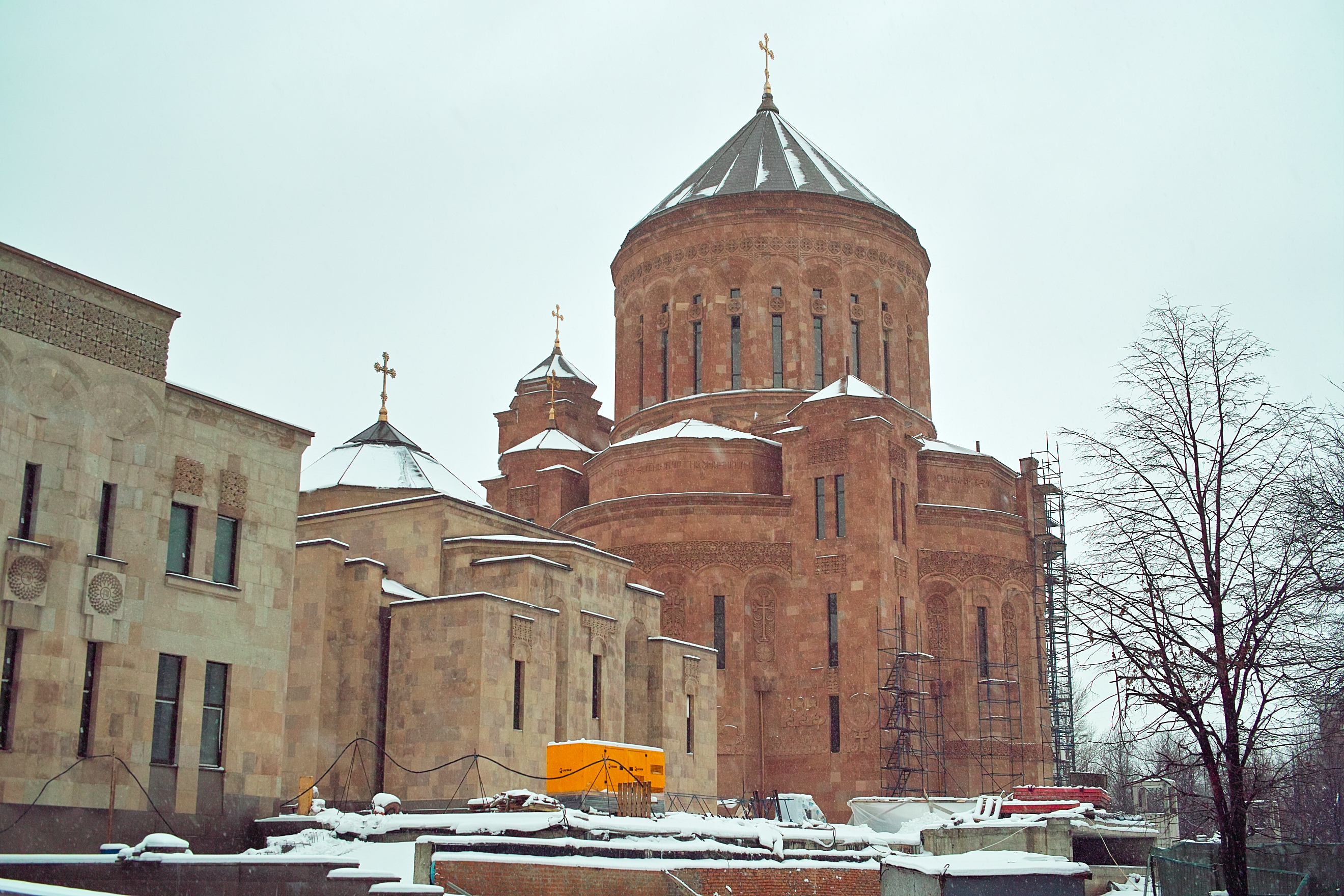
The Armenian Cathedral of Moscow, completed in 2011

The Armenian community of Moscow is one of the largest Armenian communities outside Armenia and one of the largest ethnic minorities of Moscow. In fact, some estimates even say that Moscow's Armenian population is equal to the population of Armenian capital Yerevan.

==== Jews ====
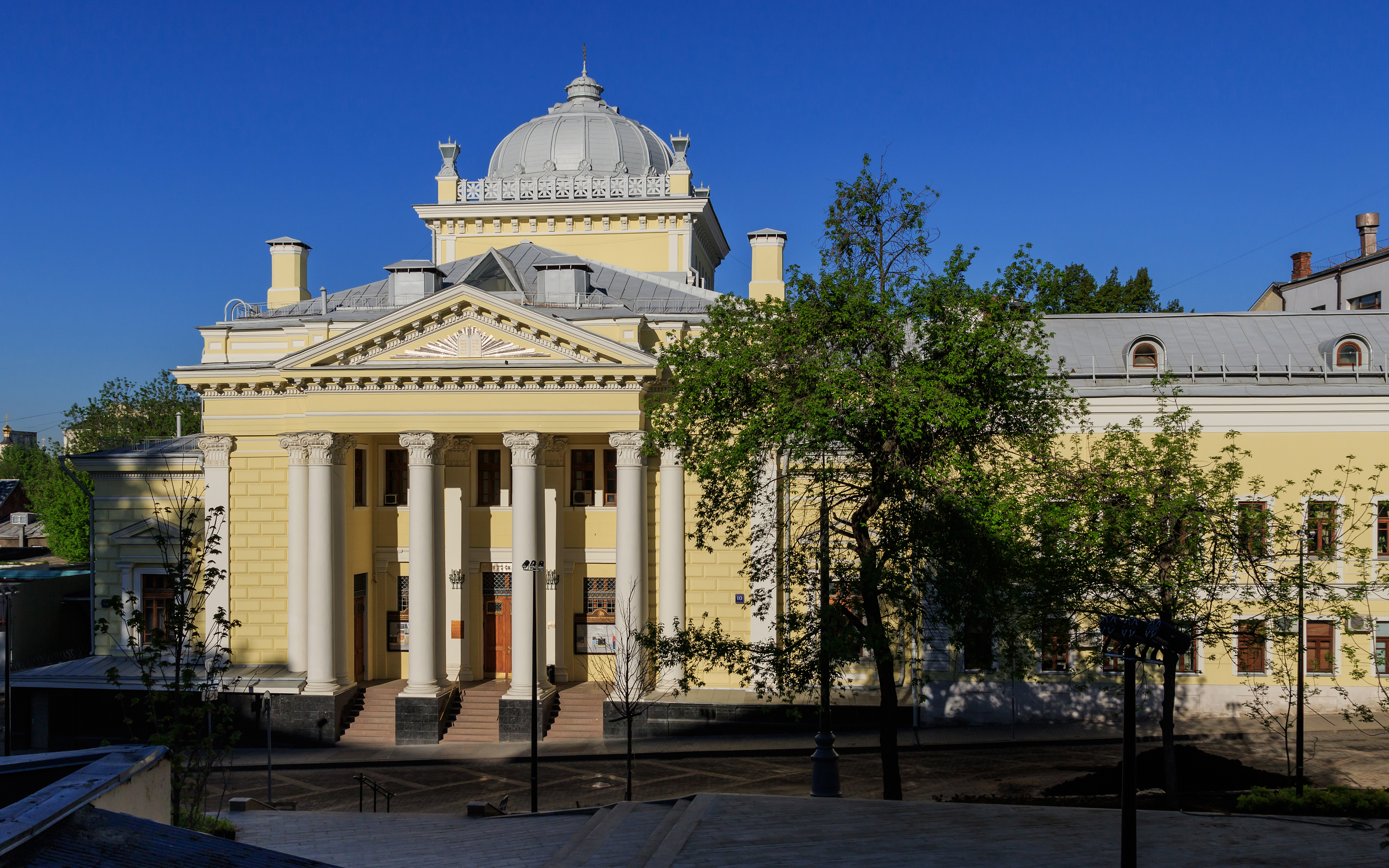
Moscow Choral Synagogue

See also: History of Jews in Moscow

Jews were the largest non-Slavic ethnic group in Moscow before the collapse of the Soviet Union. Their number dwindled from 251,350 in 1970 to 53,145 in 2010. As most Russian Jews, Moscow Jews also migrated to Israel and the US.

Jews began to settle in Moscow around the 16th century. In the 19th as the Pale of Settlement was instructed Jews were forbidden to settle in the city except for those who served in the army and after their end of service allowed to stay in the city. In 1848 there were 313 Jews in Moscow. In 1861, during the reign of Tsar Alexander II, "useful Jews", such as scholars, merchants and artisans, were allowed to settle in Moscow and the number of Jews grew rapidly. In 1890 they numbered 40,000 men and the community built synagogues, schools and charities, many located in the Zarayadye quarter on the Moskva River and in Marina Rostcha neighborhood.

Nevertheless, after the assassination of Alexander II in 1881, a more radical policy was adopted towards the Jews. Jewish enrolment was restricted in schools and universities and in 1891 all Jews were forced out of Moscow.

After the Russian Revolution in 1917 the pale of settlement was abolished and Jews were permitted to settle again in the city, many of whom were refugees. In the 1920s and 30s, the state promoted Yiddish-language arts and literature in an effort to influence its Jewish citizens. This resulted in a brief, rich cultural flourishing exemplified by the famed Moscow State Yiddish Theatre, whose inaugural production (1921) was a staging of Sholem Aleichem's stories with sets by Marc Chagall. In 1939 there were around 250,000 Jews in Moscow.

During WWII many Jews fled to inner parts of the Soviet Union but most of them returned at the end of the war and by 1970 there were again around 250,000 Jews in Moscow.

After the collapse of the Soviet Union, most of Jews emigrated from the city. In that period there was a revival of Jewish religious life, the leading bodies of Russia’s Jewish organizations were centered in Moscow and a number of synagogues re-opened. In 2010 there were 53,000 Russian Jews living in Moscow although it is estimated that there are around 150,000 people of Jewish origin in the city.

In addition, Moscow has one of the largest Israeli expatriate communities in the world, with 80,000 Israeli citizens living in the city as of 2014, almost all of them native Russian-speakers from Israel.

==== Yazidis ====
- Yazidis in Russia
