= Hillel Pewsner =

French rabbi (1922–2008)

Rabbi Hillel Pewsner

Personal life
- Born: 27 February 1922 Minsk, Belarusian Soviet Socialist Republic
- Died: 3 October 2008 (aged 86) France
- Buried: Mount of Olives Jewish Cemetery

Religious life
- Religion: Judaism
- Denomination: Chabad-Lubavitch
- Yahrtzeit: 4 Tishrei

Military service
- Rank: Legion of Honour

Rabbi Hillel Pewsner (Hebrew: הלל פבזנר) was a Chabad posek who served as a leader of the Chabad Hasidim in France for over 55 years. He also served as Av Beit Din of the Lubavitch committee in France. He founded the first Jewish Talmudic school in Paris since the conclusion of World War II.

== Early life ==
Pewsner was born in Minsk during the Soviet period, in what is now Belarus. He was the eldest son of Rabbi Avraham Baruch Pewsner and his wife Alte. His father was a spiritual leader of Chabad Hasidim in Minsk. His mother was the sister to Alter Hilewitz and the daughter of Menachem Mendel Hilewitz, who was a rabbi in the town of Zembin and son-in-law to Rabbi Avraham Segal-Landau, a descendant of Tzvi Ashkenazi.

In 1930, his father was arrested by Soviet authorities for refusing to desist from the promotion of religion, and was exiled form the city for two years. His family moved into his maternal grandparents' house in Snovsk, and after his punishment had ended, they moved to Kharkiv, where his father continued practicing Judaism and was a member of the Hasidic underground. In 1939, his father was arrested again for being a member of the "anti-Soviet clerical underground," and was sentenced to five years in exile in Kyzylorda, where he died.

== Studies and early adulthood ==
Pewsner studied in the meantime at the Tomchei Tmimim, and much of his youth was spent studying Torah in underground Chabad yeshivas. Due to crackdowns on organized religion by the Soviet authority, the students often had to travel from city to city to stay in class. He began studying in Berdychiv with his brother Shalom Dov Ber, who later died in the Holocaust. He then went to Zhytomyr and later Voronezh. During World War II he fled with many members of Chabad to Samarkand. At the end of the war, he went to Bensheim and then to a DP camp in Pocking. During his time in Germany, he studied at Yeshiva that was opened by Rabbi Avraham Eliyahu Plotkin.

During his studies, he helped smuggle Hasidic Jews from Prague and the Soviet Union before returning to Prague to continue his studies full-time. In 1946, he moved to Paris and studied at the Brunoy Yeshiva. He was ordained as a Rabbi by Plotkin, Schneur Zalman Garelik, and Nachum Shmaryahu Shonkin. In 1948, he married Eshka Eidelman, daughter of Sluwa and Rabbi Aryeh Dov Eidelman. He then settled in Brunoy where he served as a Mashgiach at the yeshiva where he studied.

== Rabbinate ==
In 1952, following the emigration of Rabbi Zalman Shimon Dworkin to New York, Pewsner was appointed rabbi of the Chabad community in France. He also worked as a rabbi for the certification of Chalav Yisrael. 9 years later, he became the head rabbi at the 17th Synagogue in Paris. In the 1970s, he began distributing Kosher food and in Bordeaux and other cities with Jewish populations, as well as overseeing kosher wine production for distribution.

In the 1980s, following a growth in the Lubavitcher community in France, a rabbinate was formed and Pewsner was appointed the Av Beit Din. He also observed Mikveh in Paris, and following the collapse of the Iron Curtain, he travelled to CIS countries to build Mikvehs for the Jewish population.

In 2000, he became one of the co-founders of the Rabbinical Center of Europe.

== Sinai Education Institute ==
In 1965, Pewsner established the Sinai educational center with the aim of providing a Jewish education to Jewish children in Paris. It became one of the largest Jewish schools in the city, and grew to 4 different buildings, one of which was named "Beis Hillel" following his death. He presided over thousands of students from K-12 for decades during his tenure as director of the school system.

In 1997, he was given the Legion of Honour, the highest French order of merit, by then-president of France, Jacques Chirac.

== Death and family ==
Pewsner died Wednesday 3 October 2008 from Pneumonia. Many prominent rabbis, including David Moshe Lieberman, Joseph Sitruk, and David Messas spoke at his funeral. His son, Avraham Baruch, was named his successor in the Rabbinate. He was buried in the Mount of Olives Jewish Cemetery in Jerusalem. A month after his death, a memorial ceremony was held at the Sinai Institute for his son.

=== Family ===
His descendants include:

- His son, Rabbi Avraham Baruch Pewsner, rabbi of Chabad in Paris
- His son Menachem Mendel Pewsner, shluchim in Geneva College
- His son, Rabbi Yosef Yitzchak, director of the Sinai Institute in paris
- His son-in-law, Rabbi Yechiel Menachem Mendel Kalmenson, Rosh yeshiva of Tmimim in Brunoy
- His son-in-law, Rabbi Yechezkel Naparstek, shluchim in Paris
- His son-in-law, Rabbi Chaim Slonim, shluchim in Dijon
