= Abraham Levy (rabbi) =

British Orthodox rabbi and author (1939–2022)

Rabbi Abraham Levy OBE

Personal life
- Born: 16 July 1939 Gibraltar
- Died: 25 December 2022 (aged 83) Maida Vale, London, England
- Buried: Golders Green Jewish Cemetery
- Spouse: Estelle (m. 1963)
- Education: University of London
- Occupation: Rabbi; theologian; author

Religious life
- Religion: Judaism

Jewish leader
- Position: Spiritual head of the British Spanish and Portuguese Congregation
- Began: 1 September 1962
- Ended: 1 September 2012
- Semikhah: Jews' College

Abraham Levy OBE (Hebrew: אברהם די יצחק הלוי, romanized: Abraham de Yitzḥak ha-Levi; 16 July 1939 – 25 December 2022) was an English Orthodox rabbi, theologian and author. He served as spiritual head of the Spanish and Portuguese Jewish community in Britain from 1962 to 2012, and was a founding member of Naima Jewish Preparatory School. Levy was appointed an Officer of the Order of the British Empire (OBE) for services on inter-faith co-operation in the 2004 New Year Honours.

== Biography ==
Abraham Levy was born on 16 July 1939 in Gibraltar. His uncle was Sir Joshua Hassan, former Chief Minister of Gibraltar. His siblings were the former Mayor of Gibraltar Solomon Levy, Nita Corre, Loli Berisch and James Levy. Rabbi Abraham Levy is also a relative to Fleur Hassan-Nahoum, deputy mayor of Jerusalem.

He moved to the United Kingdom in 1951 to study at Carmel College, and received his ordaination from Jews' College and a PhD from the University of London. He became spiritual head of the Britain Spanish and Portuguese Jewish community in 1962, a position he held until 2012. Levy served as rabbi of the Bevis Marks Synagogue and Lauderdale Road in London. He was also Honorary Deputy President of London School of Jewish Studies, founder and Honorary Principal of Naima Jewish Preparatory School, and an ecclesiastical authority for the Board of Deputies of British Jews.

Levy died from prostate cancer at his home in Maida Vale, London, on 25 December 2022, aged 83. He had one son. He is buried at Hoop Lane Sephardi Cemetery in Golders Green. King Charles paid tribute to him, describing him as a "kind and towering figure" and said he knew him "as a greatly respected and admired teacher across communities."

== Awards and honours ==
- In 1993, Levy was awarded a Knight Commander (Encomienda) Order of Civil Merit (Spain).
- In 2004, Levy was appointed an Officer of the Order of the British Empire (OBE) for services to inter-faith co-operation.

== Publications ==
- Levy, Abraham (1972). The Sephardim: A Problem of Survival. Elmar Printer & Stationers.
- Gubbay, Lucien; Levy, Abraham (1989). The Jewish Book of Why and What: A Guide to Jewish Tradition, Custom, Practice and Belief. New York: Shapolsky Publishers. ISBN 978-0-944007-09-9.
- Gubbay, Lucien; Levy, Abraham (1992). The Sephardim: Their Glorious Tradition from the Babylonian Exile to the Present Day. Carnell. ISBN 978-1-85779-036-8. Illustrated.
- Gubbay, Lucien; Levy, Abraham (2006). Ages of Man: A Plain Guide to Traditional Jewish Custom, Practice and Belief in Modern Times. Sephardi Centre. ISBN 978-0-232-51646-3.
- Levy, Abraham (2017). A Rocky Road'. Halban. ISBN 978-1-905559-81-7. Levy's memoirs, filled with anecdotes from both public life and community service and a testimony to his religious faith.
