= Conference of European Rabbis =

Orthodox rabbinical alliance in Europe

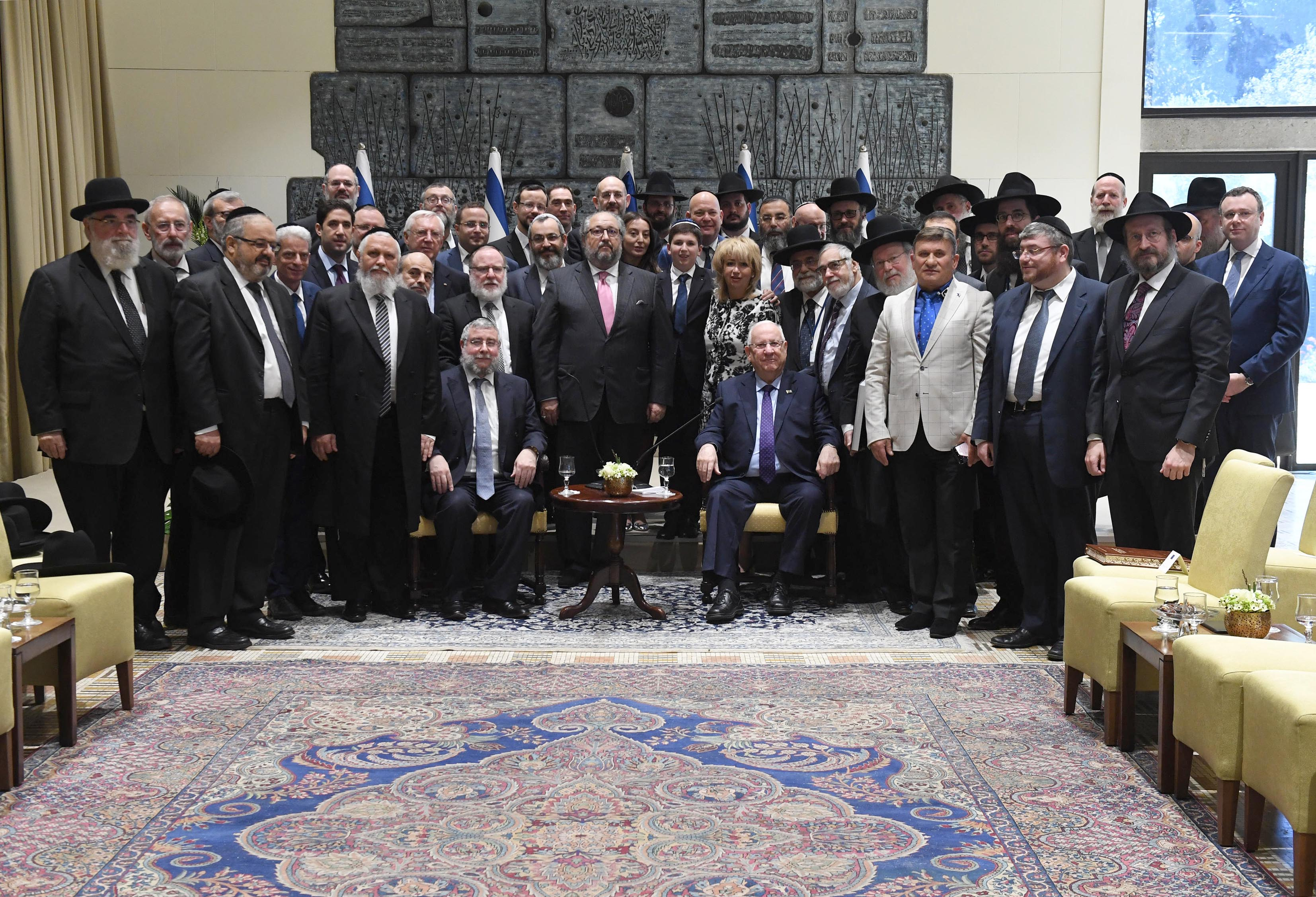
Conference of European Rabbis, November 2018

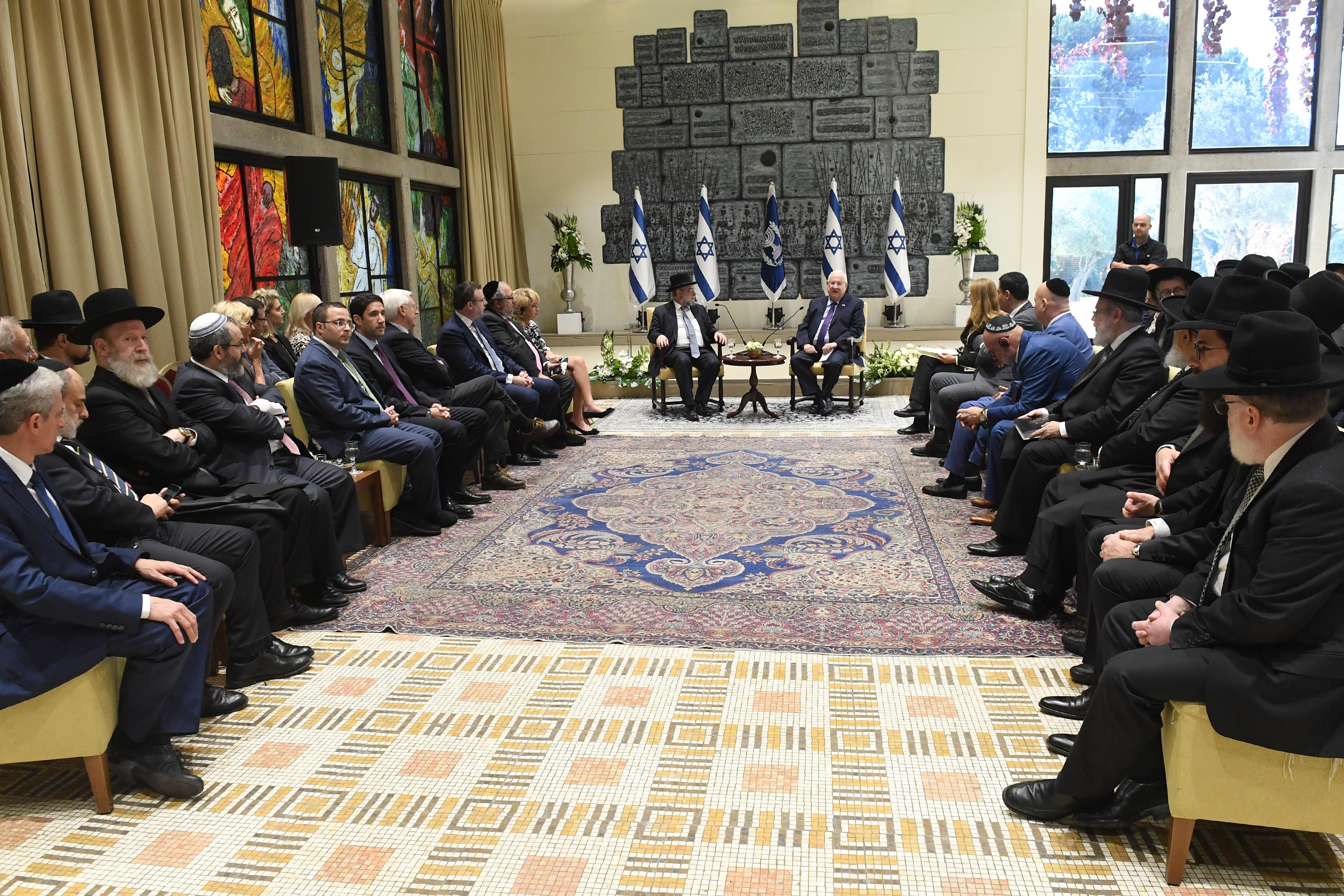
Reuven Rivlin at a meeting with the Conference of European Rabbis, November 2018

The Conference of European Rabbis (CER) is the primary Orthodox rabbinical alliance in Europe. It unites more than 700 religious leaders of the mainstream synagogue communities in Europe. It was founded in 1956 on the initiative of British Chief Rabbi Sir Israel Brodie, in order to revive the vanquished Jewish communities on the European mainland. Brodie was supported by the chief rabbi of France, Jacob Kaplan, the chief rabbi of Amsterdam, Aharon Schuster and the British Sephardic spiritual leader, Hacham Gaon. The first conference took place in 1957 in Amsterdam. As a result of the CER union with the rabbinates of the stronger western European orthodox communities, the vast majority of mainstream communities throughout the continent retained Orthodox affiliation and rabbinical leadership (with the exception of Hungary and Sweden where non-Orthodox groups had a strong prior presence). Even as some major Western European communities were deliberating joining non-Orthodox movements in the post WWII period, the strong rabbinical alliance was successful in ensuring an Orthodox rabbinate and securing the continuity of the orthodox rite even where the larger part of the membership had become secularized.

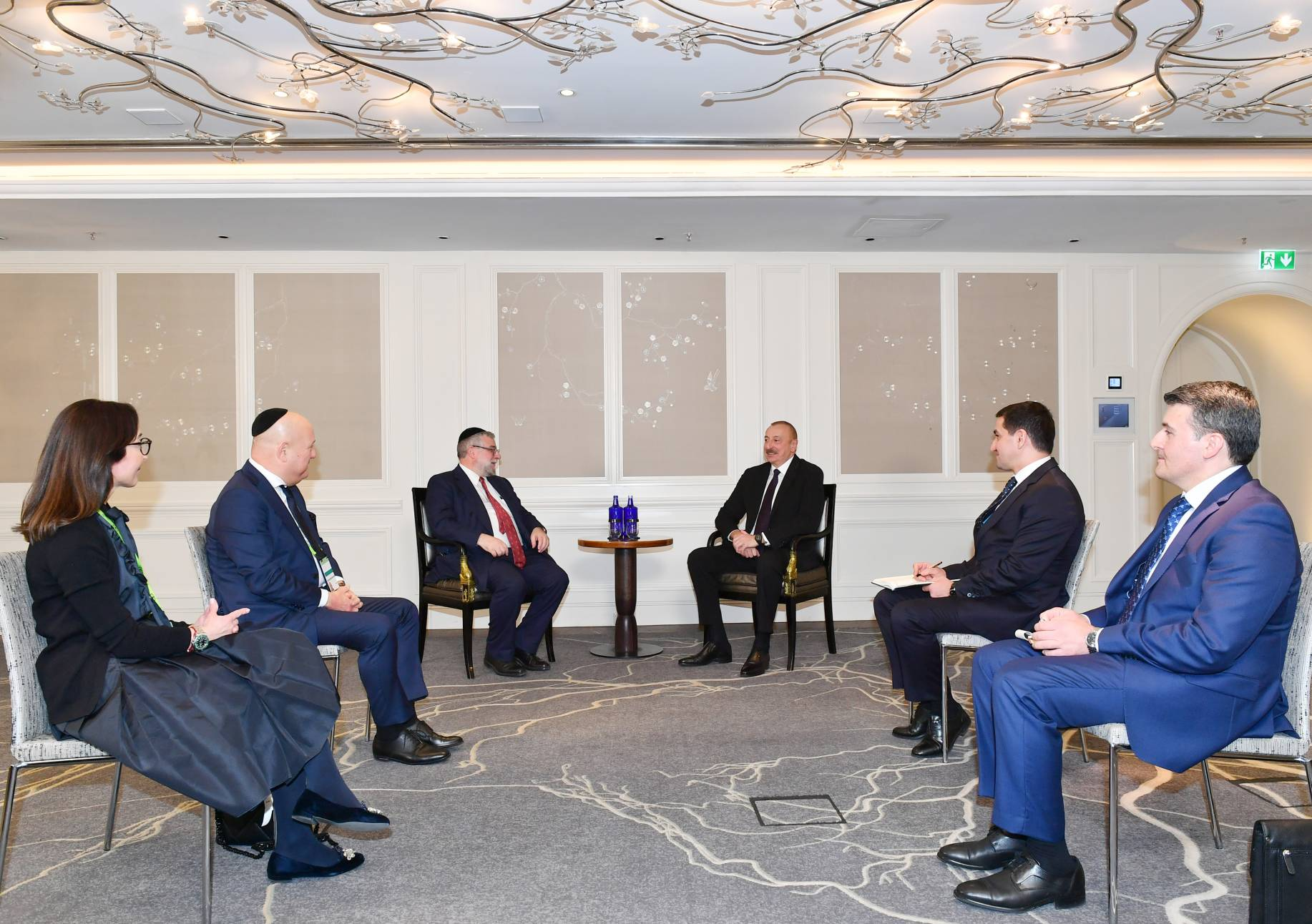
Ilham Aliyev met with President of the Conference of European Rabbis 2023

The organization is run by a standing committee of 35 members which convenes twice a year for working meetings and policy assessments in one of the European capitals. All European chief rabbis and congregational rabbis are invited to the conventions. The conventions are combined with a visit to the local Jewish community and institutions, and meetings with the government and other bodies for strengthening ties and cooperation on matters of local and pan-European Jewish significance. The Standing Committee members are in general, the chief rabbis of European countries and major cities and senior rabbinical judges.

The Conference of European Rabbis is mandated to defend the religious rights of Jews in Europe, and has become the voice of Judaism for the European continent. The CER has recently been involved with defending the rights of Jews to slaughter animals for consumption according to Jewish law and the right to circumcise their children. The CER also functions as a rabbinical authority, with expert committees to certify conversions and kashruth (kosher) operations and to pass rabbinical legal decisions affecting the broader Jewish community. The CER has always been the expert address for European Jewish communities and rabbis for support in the facilitation of their religious functions, recruitment of rabbis and educators and other issues. The CER has a special department for the planning, engineering and building of mikvehs (ritual baths) which has fulfilled over a dozen such projects all over Europe.

Following Russia's invasion of Ukraine, the Conference of European Rabbis has supported Jewish refugees from Ukraine.

== Daughter organizations ==
=== EEK ===
EEK kosher authority was established by the CER in order to maintain a golden standard of Kosher supervision and help local rabbis with the certification of kosher food. This organization collaborates with kosher authorities worldwide to provide recognized certification for the kosher consumer.

=== Hulya ===
Established in 2010 in Luxembourg by then Chairman of the Standing Committee, Pinchas Goldschmidt, was created in order to assist with rabbinical training, communal development and teaching rabbis the skills necessary to work in a modern European environment. Hulya is primarily financed by the Matanel Foundation, Luxembourg, and has its offices in Luxembourg.

=== European Beth Din ===
The European Beth Din was established over 15 years ago, as an initiative of the late Chief Rabbi Lord Jakobovits, who was then president of the Conference of European Rabbis. Responding to repeated requests from European communities where there was no functioning Rabbinical Court (Beth Din), the EBD was established to provide comprehensive Jewish legal services across a broad array of European cities.

The EBD was headed by Dayan Chanoch Ehrentreu who led the most distinguished UK Rabbinical Courts in London for 30 years and prior to that in Manchester. Dayan Ehrentreu was the undisputed senior Orthodox Halachic authority in Europe. In addition, the EBD employs Dayanim from established European Rabbinical Courts.

Whilst the EBD is based in Basle, Switzerland, it serves individuals and communities from the following countries: Germany, Poland, Bulgaria, Czech Republic, Slovakia, Austria, Hungary, Romania, Turkey, Norway, Sweden, Denmark and Finland.

Services include: Supervision of Jewish Religious Divorce, Dispute Arbitration Mediation, Supervision of Adoptions & Conversions, Communal Dispute Resolution. The EBD's website is EuropeanBethDin.com.

=== Lo Tishkach ===
The Lo Tishkach European Jewish Cemeteries Initiative (distinguish from the ESJF European Jewish Cemeteries Initiative established in 2015) was established in 2006 as a joint project of the Conference of European Rabbis and the Conference on Jewish Material Claims Against Germany. It aims to guarantee the effective and lasting preservation of Jewish cemeteries and mass graves throughout the European continent.

This initiative, identified by the Hebrew phrase Lo Tishkach (‘do not forget’), is establishing a comprehensive publicly accessible database of all Jewish burial grounds in Europe, currently featuring details on over 9,000 cemeteries and mass graves. The Lo Tishkach project is also producing a compendium of the different national and international laws and practices affecting these sites, to be used as a starting point to advocate for the better protection and preservation of Europe’s Jewish heritage.

A key aim of the project is to engage young Europeans, bringing Europe’s history alive, encouraging reflection on the values that are important for responsible citizenship and mutual respect, giving a valuable insight into Jewish culture and mobilising young people to care for our common heritage. The project uses Jewish cemeteries – a physical legacy of formerly vibrant Jewish communities – as the focus of a practical activity and learning programme to meaningfully transmit to younger generations the lessons of the Holocaust.

Groups of young people trained by Lo Tishkach have already begun to visit thousands of Jewish burial sites across Europe. These groups gather vital information on local Jewish life, history and culture, photograph and survey each cemetery, and undertake practical work to help preserve and protect these important sites. Lo Tiskach's official website is lo-tishkach.org

== See also ==
- Rabbinical Center of Europe
