= Alan Mocatta =

Sir Alan Abraham Mocatta, OBE (27 June 1907 – 1 November 1990) was a British judge, an expert on restrictive practices and a leader of the Spanish and Portuguese Jews of Britain.

== Legal and military career ==
After attending Clifton College and New College, Oxford, he was called to the bar at the Inner Temple in 1930.

In World War II he first served as 2nd Lieutenant in 12 LAA Regiment, RA, TA, 1939, and was promoted to brigade major, 56 AA Brigade, 1940–41; to GSO (2) AA HQ BTNI, 1941–42; and finally to Lieutenant-Colonel General Staff, Army Council Secretariat, War Office, 1942-45. He was awarded the OBE in 1944.

Returning to his legal career after the end of the war, he was appointed QC in 1951. He was elected a Bencher of his Inn in 1960. He served as a Judge of the High Court of Justice (Queen's Bench Division) from 1961 (the year in which he received his knighthood) to 1981. Also from 1961 to 1981 he was a Member of the Restrictive Practices Court, of which he was President from 1970.

In 1982 he served as Treasurer of the Inner Temple.

He contributed also to legal literature as joint editor on the 14th-19th editions of Scrutton on Charter Parties; editor on the 3rd edition of Rowlatt on Principal and Surety; and as a member of the Advisory Panel for the 4th edition of Halsbury's Laws of England.

From 1955 to 1956 he was Chairman of the Treasury Committee on Cheque Endorsement.

At the 1962 Winter Assizes in Carmarthen, he presided over what was then the longest criminal trial in British legal history, sitting for 55 court days in what became known as 'The West Wales (or Black Mountains) Lime Fraud enquiry'.

He was also Chairman of the Council of Jews' College, 1945–61 and Vice-President of the Board of Elders of the Spanish and Portuguese Jews' Congregation, London, from 1961 to 1967, and President from 1967 to 1982.
