= Maryina Roshcha Synagogue =

Orthodox synagogue in Moscow, Russia

- Russian: Московская Синагога Хабада в Марьиной Роще
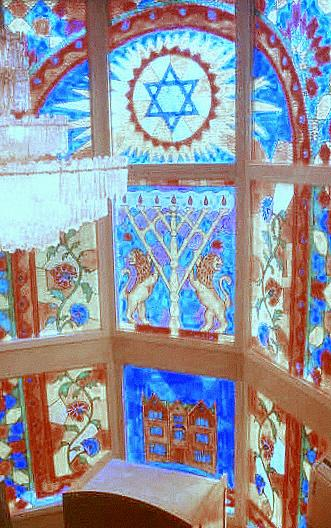
- Stained glass windows in the synagogue in 2008

- Location of the synagogue in Moscow

Religion
- Affiliation: Hasidic Judaism
- Rite: Nusach Ashkenaz
- Ecclesiastical or organisational status: Synagogue
- Status: Actice

Location
- Location: 5a Vtoroy Vysheslavtsev Lane, Moscow
- Country: Russia
- Coordinates: 55°47′27″N 37°36′29″E

Architecture
- Architect: Israel Gudovich
- Type: Synagogue architecture
- Established: 1925 (as a congregation)
- Completed: 1996
- Materials: Brick

The Maryina Roshcha Synagogue (Russian: Московская Синагога Хабада в Марьиной Роще), also known as the Mar'ina Roscha Contemporary Synagogue, is a Hasidic Jewish congregation and synagogue, located at 5a Vtoroy Vysheslavtsev Lane, in Moscow, Russia. The congregation was established in 1925.

== History ==
Also known as the "Second Moscow Synagogue" (after the Moscow Choral Synagogue), the synagogue building was completed in 1996, and replaced the one destroyed by fire in 1993. Since 2000 it's also a Chabad-Lubavitch Community Center.

The synagogue is part of a large Jewish spiritual center under the auspices of the Moscow Jewish Public Center (Russian: МЕОЦ), which also incorporated nearby former Bakhmetevsky Bus Garage and Beyt Schwidler school.

== See also ==
- History of the Jews in Moscow
- List of synagogues in Russia
