= Bevis Marks Synagogue =

Synagogue in London, United Kingdom

- Hebrew: קָהָל קָדוֹשׁ שַׁעַר הַשָׁמַיִם
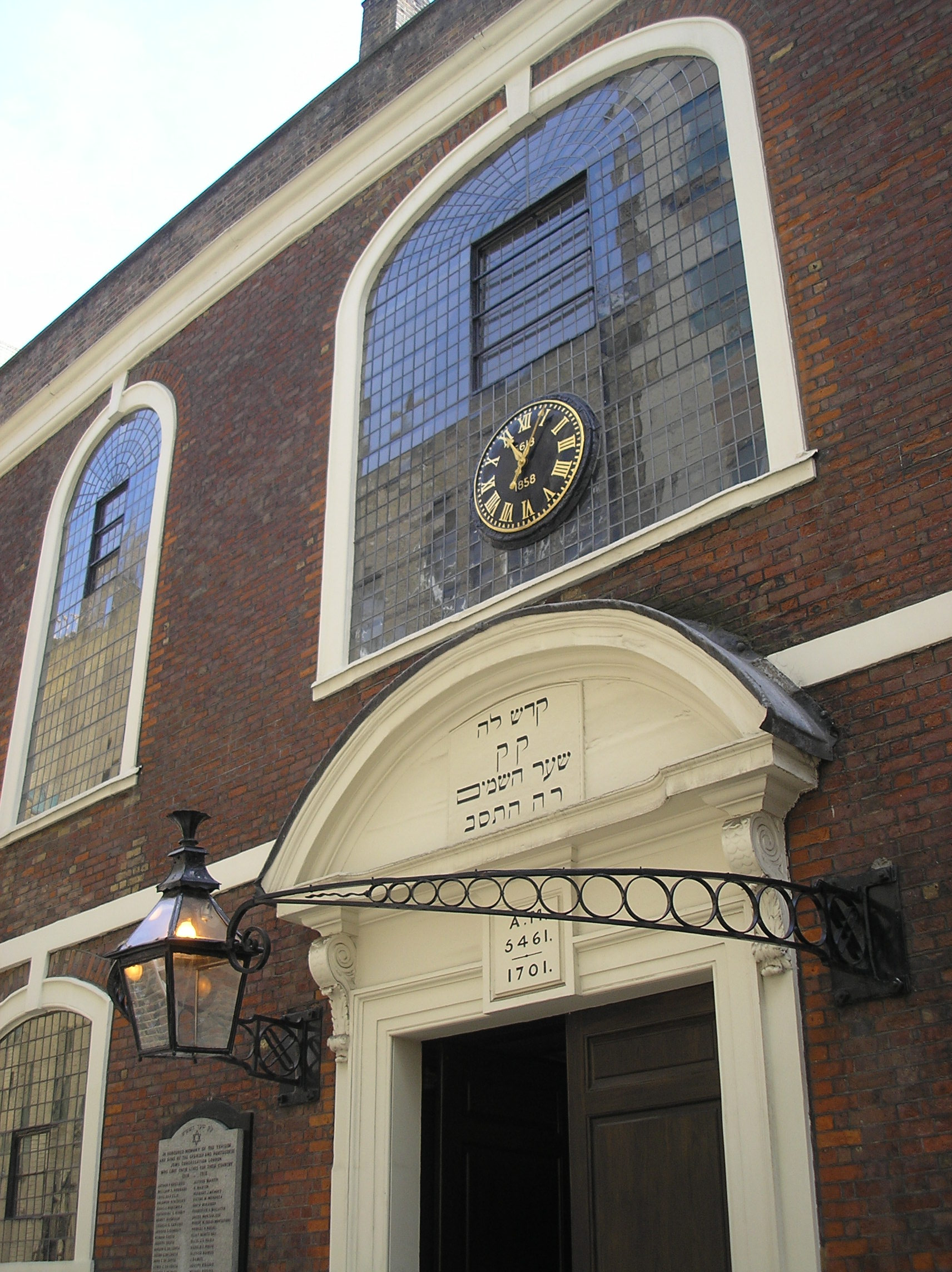
- The synagogue, in 2008

- Location of the synagogue in London

Religion
- Affiliation: Orthodox Judaism
- Rite: Spanish and Portuguese Jews
- Ecclesiastical or organisational status: Synagogue
- Status: Active

Location
- Location: 4 Heneage Lane, Bevis Marks, London, England EC3A 5DQ
- Country: United Kingdom
- Coordinates: 51°30′52″N 0°4′45″W

Architecture
- Completed: 1701; 325 years ago

Listed Building – Grade I
- Official name: Bevis Marks Synagogue
- Type: Listed building
- Designated: 4 January 1950
- Reference no.: 1064745

Bevis Marks Synagogue, officially Qahal Kadosh Sha'ar ha-Shamayim (Hebrew: קָהָל קָדוֹשׁ שַׁעַר הַשָׁמַיִם, lit. 'Holy Congregation Gate of Heaven'), is an Orthodox Jewish congregation and synagogue, located off Bevis Marks, Aldgate, in the City of London, England, in the United Kingdom. The congregation is affiliated to London's historic Spanish and Portuguese Jewish community and worships in the Sephardic rite.

Built in 1701, the Grade I listed building is the oldest synagogue in the United Kingdom in continuous use. It is the only synagogue building in Europe that has continuously held regular services for more than 320 years.

== History ==
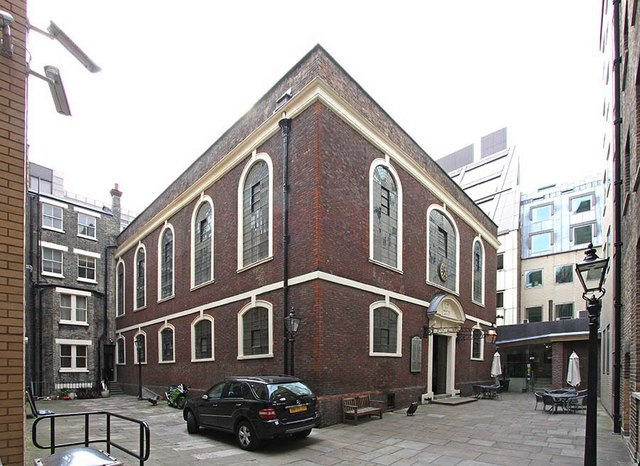
Exterior of the synagogue

=== Construction ===
The origins of the community date from an influx to London of crypto-Jews, or so called Marranos, from Spain and Portugal, mostly via the growing Sephardi Jewish community in Amsterdam, in the early seventeenth century. These Jews began practising their religion openly once it became possible to do so through Jewish resettlement in England under the rule of Oliver Cromwell.

Services at a small synagogue in Creechurch Lane began in 1657, and the congregation also secured land for its own cemetery in Mile End (the Velho Cemetery). In 1663, it was visited on the festival of Simchat Torah by the diarist Samuel Pepys, who recorded his impressions of the service. In 1698 Rabbi David Nieto took spiritual charge of the congregation of "Spanish and Portuguese Jews" (Sephardim).

The community saw a significant influx of crypto-Jews from Portugal fleeing the inquisition during the seventeenth and eighteenth century. Marriage and circumcision records record couples as "Vindos de Portugal", or more rarely "Vindos de Espanha", for the purpose of reconsecrating their vows now they were free to practice Judaism openly or undertaking an adult circumcision. Alongside migration from Sephardi centres such as Amsterdam and Livorno there was a steady influx of refugees from Portugal up until around 1735, after which it diminished, with some of the last recorded arrivals from Portugal as late as 1790. Records show arrivals escaping principally from major cities such as Lisbon or Porto and the remote borderland region from Spain, such as from Celorico da Beira, Guarda, Braganza or Belmonte. As a result of this migration the sermon at Bevis Marks took place in Portuguese until as late as 1833 when they switched to English.

This influx made it necessary to obtain more commodious quarters. Accordingly, a committee was appointed, consisting of António Gomes Serra, Menasseh Mendes, Isaac Israel de Sequeira alias Alfonso Rodrigues, Manuel Nunez Miranda, Andrea Lopez, and Pontaleão Rodriguez. It investigated matters for nearly a year and, on 12 February 1699, signed a contract with Joseph Avis, a Quaker, for the construction of a building to cost £2,650. According to legend, Avis declined to collect his full fee, on the ground that it was wrong to profit from building a house of God. Also unsubstantiated is the story that a timber was donated by the then Princess Anne for the roof of the synagogue. On 24 June 1699, the committee leased from Sir Thomas and Lady Pointz (also known as Littleton) a tract of land at Plough Yard, in Bevis Marks, for 61 years, with the option of renewal for a further 38 years, at £120 a year.

The structure was completed and dedicated in September 1701. The interior decor and furnishing and layout of the synagogue reflect the influence of the great Portuguese Synagogue of Amsterdam of 1675. It has been claimed that the design was also influenced by Christopher Wren, the architect of the nearby St Paul's Cathedral. The roof was destroyed by fire in 1738 and repaired in 1749. During the London Blitz the synagogue's silver, records and fittings were removed to a place of safety; the synagogue suffered only minor damage. The synagogue suffered some collateral damage from the IRA in 1992 and the 1993 Bishopsgate bombing, but this was restored. The essential original structure of the building thus remains today.

In 1747 Benjamin Mendes da Costa bought the lease of the ground on which the building stood, and presented it to the congregation, vesting the deeds in the names of a committee consisting of Gabriel Lopez de Britto, David Aboab Ozorio, Moses Gomes Serra, David Franco, Joseph Jessurun Rodriguez, and Moses Mendes da Costa.

=== Influence ===
For Sephardic Jews, the Bevis Marks Synagogue was a religious centre of the Anglo-Jewish world for more than a century, and served as a clearing-house for congregational and individual Jewish problems all over the world. These included the appeal of Jews in Jamaica for a reduction in taxation (1736), the internecine quarrel among Jews in Barbados (1753), and the aiding of seven-year-old Moses de Paz, who escaped from Gibraltar in 1777 to avoid a forced conversion to Christianity. The congregation came to the aid of the Jewish community in Ireland by donating funds to build a wall around the Ballybough Cemetery and providing an agent to oversee the works. The deeds for the cemetery were then lodged at Bevis Marks Synagogue. Through the actions of the leading synagogue member Moses Montefiore the synagogue was also involved in the 19th century in the Damascus Affair and the Mortara Affair, two events provoking much international discussion of Jewish rights and reputation. It was part of the inspiration for Jacob Sassoon's Ohel Rachel Synagogue in Shanghai, the largest synagogue in the Far East.

Amongst the Chief Rabbis of the Anglo-Sephardic Community (Hahamim) who have served at Bevis Marks have been Daniel Nieto (1654–1728), Benjamin Artom (1835–1879), Abraham Haliva (Halua) (1791-1853) and Moses Gaster (1856–1939). Amongst other notable members of the synagogue's congregation have been author and educator Miriam Mendes Belisario, the boxer Daniel Mendoza, and Isaac D'Israeli (father of Benjamin Disraeli), who resigned from the congregation after an argument over synagogue fees.

=== Local migration of the community ===
As the Spanish and Portuguese Jewish community grew and moved out of the City and East End of London to the West End and the suburbs, members demanded a new synagogue to be built in the West End. When the leadership refused this, some members formed a breakaway synagogue in Burton Street, which later became the West London Synagogue. In 1853 a branch synagogue was opened in Wigmore Street; in 1866 this moved to Bryanston Street, Bayswater. Attendance at Bevis Marks declined so much that in 1886 a move to sell the site was contemplated; a "Bevis Marks Anti-Demolition League" was founded, under the auspices of H. Guedalla and A. H. Newman, and the proposed move was abandoned.

In 1896 a new synagogue was built at Lauderdale Road, Maida Vale, as successor to the Bryanston Street synagogue. A second satellite congregation was established at 46 Forty Avenue, Wembley during the 1960s.

=== Impact of nearby IRA attacks ===
On 10 April 1992, the synagogue was affected by an IRA terrorist attack on the Baltic Exchange. The bomb was contained in a large white truck and consisted of a fertiliser device wrapped with a detonation cord made from Semtex. The Chairman of Buildings for the Spanish & Portuguese Congregation, Mr Barry Musikant, donning a hard hat and escorted by police, was one of the first people to enter the cordoned area of streets to examine the damage to the synagogue. He, with the agreement of the insurance company, put in place a programme of repair which lasted fifteen weeks, but enabled the building to be restored before his daughter's wedding.

The following year the synagogue was also affected by an attack on Bishopsgate. Nearly £200,000 was raised by donation to help with the renovations to return it to its former glory.

=== National lottery and government funding ===
King Charles is a patron of the synagogue, heading a 2019 conservation appeal for funds to turn it into a heritage centre. In June 2019, the synagogue was awarded £2.7m by the National Lottery for conservation work and to cover half the costs of building a new religious and cultural centre. In early 2021, it received £497,000 from the Government's Culture Recovery Fund "to protect its collection of significant objects and illuminate the history of the site."

== Features ==
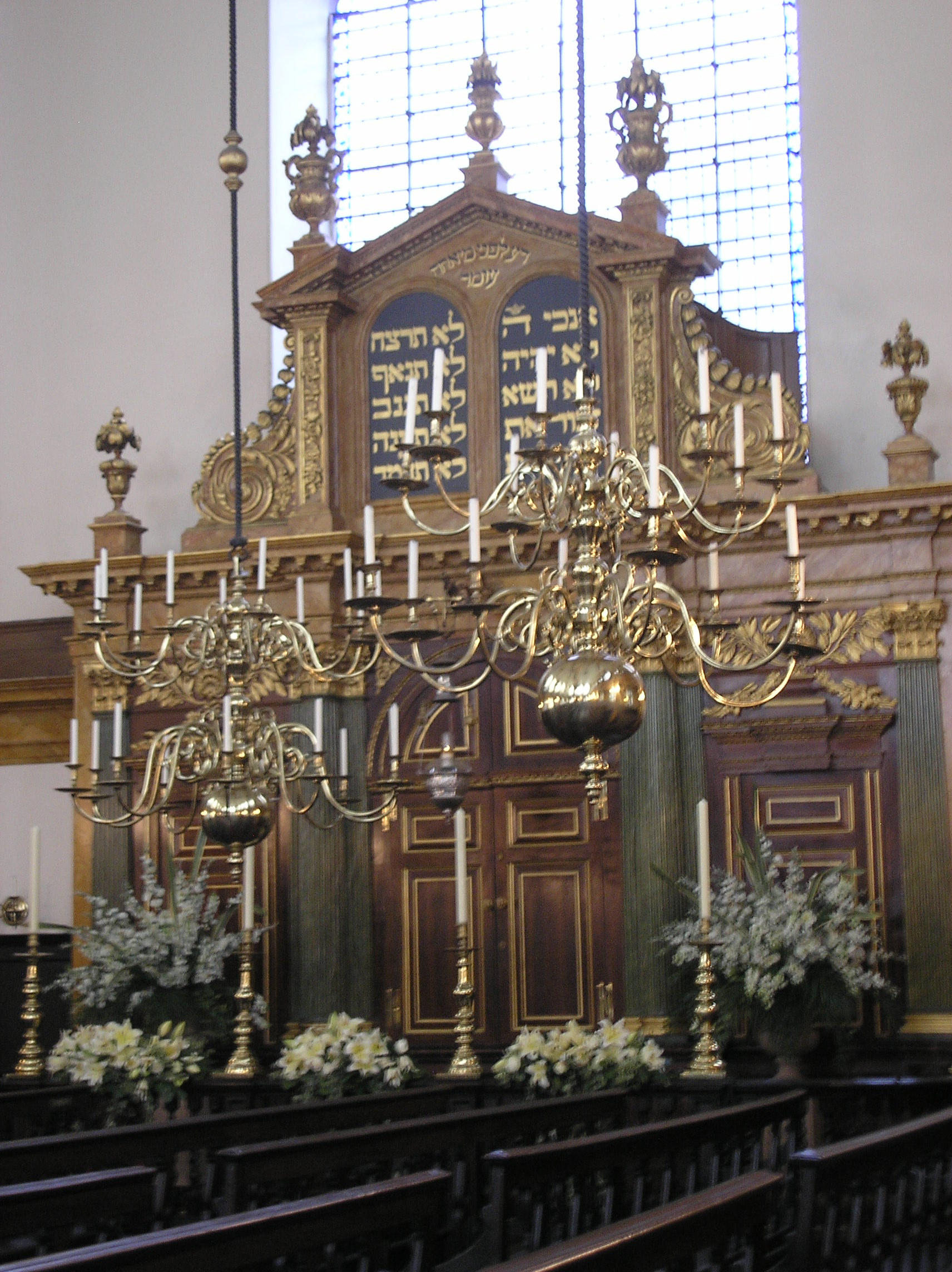
The Ark

The building has been designated a Grade I listed building since 1950.

A prominent feature of the synagogue is the Renaissance-style ark (containing the Torah scrolls) located at the centre of the Eastern wall of the building. It resembles in design the reredos of the churches of the same period. Painted to look as though it is made of coloured Italian marble, it is in fact made entirely of oak. The architectural critic Ian Nairn in his book Nairn's London described the synagogue as defined by a "great luminous room, compassionate light streaming in through big clear glass windows."

Seven hanging brass candelabra symbolise the seven days of the week, the largest of which – hanging in the centre of the synagogue – represents the Sabbath. This central candelabrum was donated by the community of the Great Synagogue of Amsterdam. The candles are still lit today for weddings and the Jewish Festivals. The rest of the year the Synagogue is lit by the electric lights added in 1928. The ner tamid (sanctuary lamp) is of silver and dates from 1876.

Twelve pillars, symbolising the twelve tribes of Israel, support the women's gallery.

The synagogue contains benches running parallel to the side walls and facing inward, leaving two aisles for the procession with the Torah scrolls. In addition, backless benches at the rear of the synagogue, taken from the original synagogue at Creechurch Lane, date from 1657 and are still regularly used.

A number of seats in the synagogue are roped off as they belong or have belonged to notable people within the community. Two seats were reserved for the most senior officials of the congregation's publishing arm, Heshaim. A third seat, fitted with a footstool, (the seat nearest the Ark on the central row of the left half of the benches) is also withheld as it belonged to Moses Montefiore. It is now only ever occupied by very senior dignitaries as a particular honour. In 2001 Prince Charles used the seat during the synagogue's tercentenary service. Prime Minister Tony Blair used it for the service celebrating the 350th anniversary of the re-settlement of the Jews in Great Britain in 2006, when the Chief Rabbi of the United Synagogue Sir Jonathan Sacks and the Lord Mayor of London were also present.

The synagogue retains notable historical records, including community circumcision and marriage records dating back to 1679.

== The modern Sephardic community ==
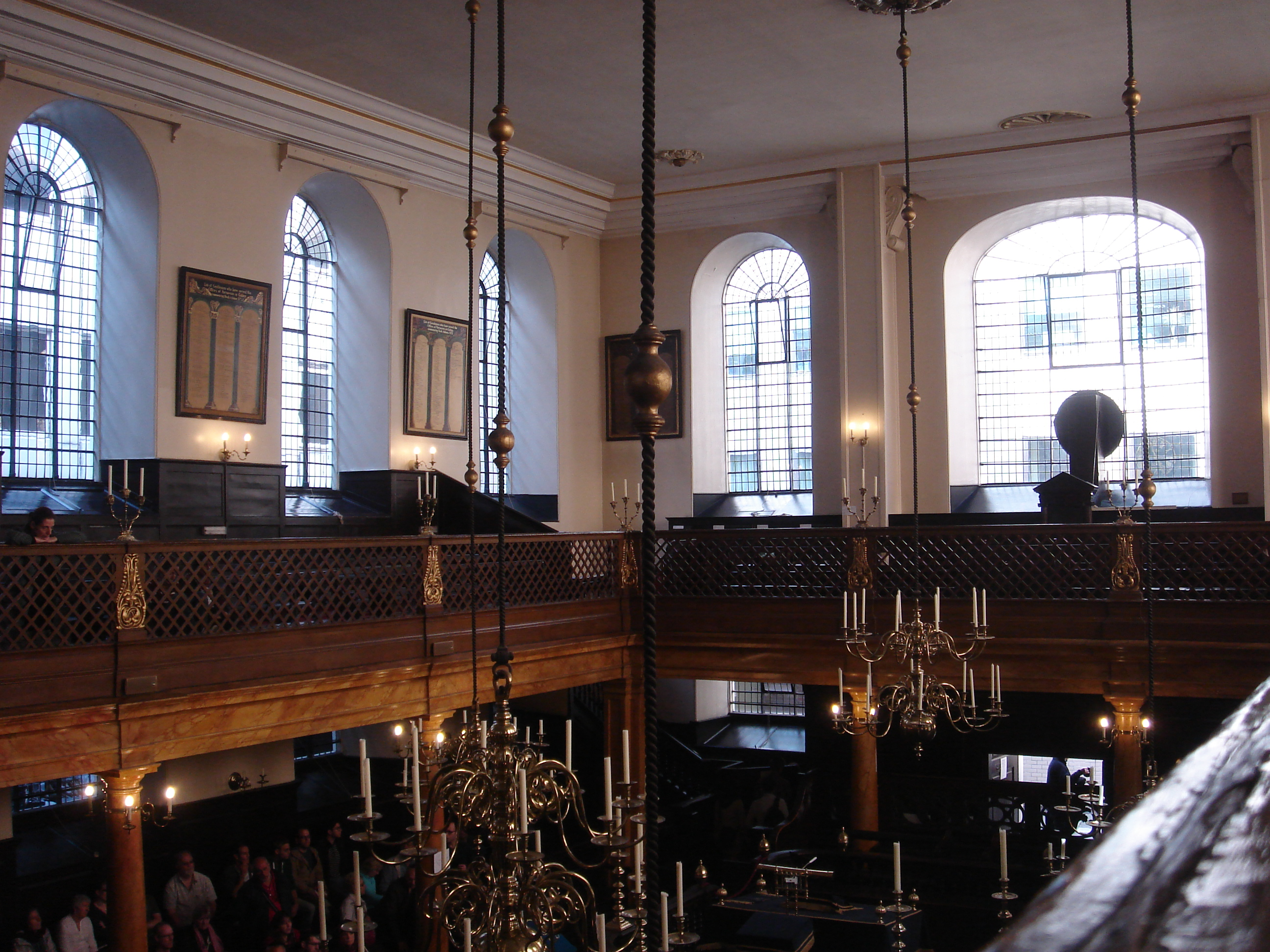
The interior of the synagogue in 2011

On Friday 13 November 1998, Peter, Lord Levene of Portsoken, became the eighth Jewish Lord Mayor of London. An Ashkenazi Jew by birth, Lord Levene's first public act was to walk, with a retinue, from his official residence (Mansion House) to Bevis Marks Synagogue, for the Sabbath Eve service. This was repeated on Friday 12 November 2010 by the then Lord Mayor Michael Bear.

Today the Spanish and Portuguese descendant community in London operates three synagogues: Bevis Marks, Lauderdale Road (which is the community's administrative headquarters) and a smaller synagogue in Wembley. The community's sheltered housing scheme Harris Court and old-age home Edinburgh House are also located in Wembley. A number of other Sephardic synagogues in Britain have associated status. Bevis Marks Synagogue remains the flagship synagogue of the British Sephardic Jewish community. Daily services are held and the synagogue is frequently a venue for weddings and other celebrations.

Since August 2015, the rabbi of Bevis Marks is Shalom Morris, an American of Ashkenazi descent. He is a great-grandson of Rabbi Eliezer Silver.

== Nearby development ==
In 2018, the synagogue rescinded its objections to a proposed development after the architects amended the plans and the developers made a donation to the synagogue. The Jewish Chronicle reported that some congregants were unhappy with decision and felt the leadership had lacked ethics.

In 2020 and 2021 there was considerable opposition to planning applications for two nearby skyscrapers which would cut off natural light to the synagogue, threatening its ongoing use for daily services. The community had said the historic synagogue faces a closure threat as the loss of light would render services "almost impossible". Plans to build both tower blocks were ultimately denied by City of London councillors. In 2023, the Creechurch Conservation Area was approved, which should protect Bevis Marks and Grade II* St Botolph's-without-Aldgate from development.

In September 2021, it emerged that developers planned to build 21-storey and 48-storey buildings right next to the synagogue. It was claimed this would block natural light from the building for all but one hour a day. The synagogue was only lit by up to 240 candles and electric lighting installed in 1928. A campaign was launched to block the development with the Corporation of London saying at the time that no decision had been made. It is reported to have received 1,500 letters of objection. The alarm was raised by an article in The New York Times ahead of reporting by most of the British press. Members of the London Jewish community took to social media on the eve of Yom Kippur to draw attention to the threat to the synagogue including writer Simon Sebag-Montefiore and journalists Jonathan Freedland and Ben Judah. According to The New York Times, a report commissioned by the developers said that the building would have no impact on the amount of natural light the synagogue received.

In 2026, the synagogue held a consultation on a proposed planning framework that would limit development that obstructed the synagogue's view of the moon, which is required for Kiddush Levana, and the stars.

== Associated people ==
- Aby Belasco, English bare-knuckle boxer
- Isaac D'Israeli (1766–1848), writer, scholar and man of letters
- Joseph Dweck
- David Abarbanel Lindo
- Daniel Mendoza, English boxing champion
- Sir Moses Montefiore
- Isaac Nieto

== See also ==
- History of the Jews in England
- List of synagogues in the United Kingdom
- Oldest synagogues in the United Kingdom

== Further information ==
- Gaster, Rabbi Moses (1901). History of the Ancient Synagogue of the Spanish and Portuguese Jews.
- Greene, Richard Allen. "At 300, Britain's oldest shul wants a brand-new image", Jewish Telegraphic Agency via Jweekly, 12 October 2001, accessed 23 November 2010.
- Hyamson, Moses (1951). The Sephardim of England: A History of the Spanish and Portuguese Jewish Community 1492–1951, London.
- Hyamson, Moses (1951). Treasures of a London temple: A descriptive catalogue of the ritual plate, mantles and furniture of the Spanish and Portuguese Jews' Synagogue in Bevis Marks, London. ASIN B0000CI83D.
- Kadish, Sharman; Bowman, Barbara; and Kendall, Derek. (2001). Bevis Marks Synagogue 1701–2001: A Short History of the Building and an Appreciation of Its Architecture, English Heritage. ISBN 1-873592-65-5
- Krinsky, Carol Herselle (1996). Synagogues of Europe: architecture, history, meaning, Courier Dover Publications, pp. 412–415.
- Paul, Lindsay (1993). The Synagogues of London, Vallentine Mitchell.
- Picciotto, James (1875). Sketches of Anglo-Jewish History, Trübner & Co.
- "Bevis Marks Synagogue", Jewish Communities and Records – UK, hosted by jewishgen.org, page created 17 March 2003 with subsequent updates, accessed 24 November 2010.
