= Abramsky =

Abramsky or Abramski is a patronymic surname meaning "son of Abram", the Biblical figure. The name is most prevalent among Jews. Notable people with the surname include:

- Alexander Abramsky (1898–1985), Russian composer
- Chimen Abramsky (1916–2010), English professor of Jewish studies
- Jenny Abramsky (born 1946), British radio personality
- Nili Abramski (born 1970), Israeli long-distance runner
- Samson Abramsky (born 1953), British computer scientist
- Sasha Abramsky (born 1972), British journalist and author
- Yehezkel Abramsky (1886–1976), British Orthodox rabbi
