= Yonason Abraham =

British rabbi

Rabbi Yonason Abraham (born 1964) is a British rabbi. He served a number of years on the Melbourne Beth Din and as the Rabbi of the Caulfield Shule, he then returned to London where he was given a post on the London Beth Din, a position he resigned in March 2019. He was also the rabbi of Toras Chaim synagogue in Hendon, a position he resigned at the same time

== Biography ==
=== Early life and education ===
Abraham was born in London and went to Hasmonean High School, where his father Rabbi Sasson Abraham was a teacher and also served as minister of Ohel David Eastern Synagogue from 1980 until 1994. He studied in the yeshivos of Gateshead and Lakewood before moving to Australia in 1985 where he was a member of the Lakewood Kollel Beit Hatalmud (Melbourne). He originally came to Melbourne with the Mashgiach of Lakewood, HaRav Nosson Meir Wachtfogel who was then trying to establish a yeshiva in the city. He served seven years as the rabbi of Caulfield Shule and in that time he joined the Melbourne Beth Din. He also regularly consulted with, and helped, Sydney set up its own eruv.

=== Resignation from Caulfield Shule ===
The Caulfield Shule became embroiled in a bitter dispute between the Main Minyan and congregants of breakaway minyan Or Chadash, led by Rabbi Mottel Krasnjanski, as well as by brothers David and Barry Mond. The main faction refused to provide the breakaway faction with proxy forms for the AGM due to be held on 20 September 2000, or allow them access to the register of members. The dispute quickly escalated with an application for an injunction at the Magistrates' Court, which was granted, preventing the AGM until the dispute was resolved by Rabbinic Arbitration or otherwise. David Mond was subject to hate mail, which he claimed was incited by Abraham, and Abraham had Mond's religious activities within the synagogue restricted. A special rabbinical tribunal, known as a Zabla was established to resolve the issues, comprising Yehoram Ulman, Yitzchak Berger, and Yehuda Katz. A public hearing took place in October 2001, with Abraham giving testimony on 29 October. He was due to resume cross examination on the 30th. Abraham announced on the 30th that he had resigned with immediate effect and would be departing the next day to London. Due to testify on the 31st, Abraham did not attend. Accusations of collusion between certain of the arbitrators to prevent Abraham from having to testify further were raised in the Supreme Court of Victoria. Ulman acknowledged that "Abraham was in a high state of agitation, was crying at one stage during his meeting with the dayanim... and his lack of composure was such that Rabbi Ulman had no expectation that he would reappear to continue giving evidence on 31st October". The arbitration ultimately failed, with Abraham's sudden departure becoming a main issue of contention in the subsequent supreme court case.

=== Move to London ===
He then, in 2001 and aged 37, took up a position on the London Beth Din thanks to recruitment by Chanoch Ehrentreu where he became an integral part of its everyday running. He was also heavily involved with community organisations Tribe and Jabez. In 2016 Abraham accepted the position of Nasi (president) of Shuvu, a network of day schools founded 1991 by Rabbi Avraham Pam. Abraham was also appointed Nasi of the Leeds Kollel.

=== Resignation from all public positions ===
On 6 March 2019, the Rosh Beth Din of the London Beth Din announced that on 5 March 2019 Dayan Abraham stood down from his position at London Beth Din, after an affair with a married woman. He also resigned his rabbinate of the Toras Chaim synagogue and his other community roles. In his resignation letter he said that definitely he had "fallen short of the standards expected of me".
