= Alan Kimche =

British Rabbi

Rabbi Dr. Alan Kimche
- רב אברהם בן ישראל קמחי
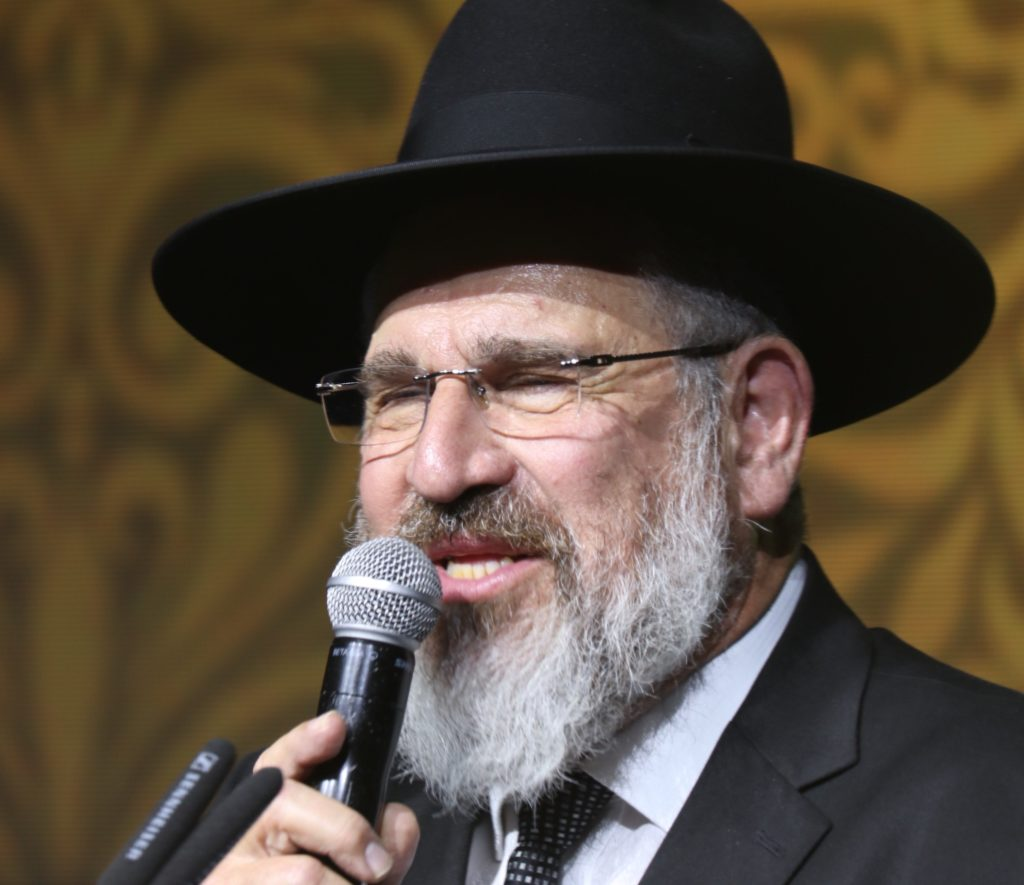
- Rabbi Alan Kimche
- Title: Rabbi

Personal life
- Born: Alan Abraham Kimche; February 10, 1952 (age 74) Melbourne, Australia
- Spouse: Via Kimche
- Parent(s): James and Sybil Kimche
- Education: University College London, Birkbeck, University of London
- Occupation: Rabbi, teacher, writer, lecturer

Religious life
- Religion: Judaism

Jewish leader
- Successor: Eliezer Zobin
- Organization: Ner Yisrael Synagogue (former)

Alan Abraham Kimche (Hebrew: רב אברהם בן ישראל קמחי) is a British-Israeli Orthodox Rabbi and community leader. He was both the founding Rabbi and Rav of the Ner Yisrael Synagogue in Hendon, London, for 35 years until his retirement in 2019. He currently works as a teacher, writer, and lecturer in Israel.

== Early life and education ==
Kimche was born in Melbourne, Australia, on 10 February 1952. His parents, James and Sybil Kimche, were both Orthodox Jews who had fled Europe due to Nazi persecution immediately prior to World War Two. At the age of five, his parents resettled the family in Stamford Hill, London. Kimche grew up attending Avigdor Primary School and Hasmonean High School, and was a congregant in the synagogue of Rabbi Josef Hirsch Dunner.

Kimche left school at the age of sixteen to study at Orthodox Yeshivot in Israel. He first studied at the Kol Torah Yeshivah in Bayit Vegan, Jerusalem, under the tutelage of Rabbi Shlomo Zalman Auerbach. Kimche grew close to him, and served as his personal driver for a short period. Three years later, Kimche moved to the Mir Yeshiva in Beit Yisrael, where he attended the class of Rabbi Chaim Shmuelevitz and eventually gained rabbinic ordination from two prominent rabbinic authorities: Rabbi Yaakov Fink and Rabbi Yehoshua Neuwirth.

In 1975 Kimche enrolled in University College London to study philosophy. After a meeting with Isaiah Berlin, he was granted support from the Wolfson Foundation to pursue his undergraduate studies, which he completed in 1978.

Throughout the earlier half of his rabbinic career, Kimche worked intermittently on his doctoral thesis at Birkbeck, University of London, under the direction of David-Hillel Ruben. He submitted his thesis in February 2006, which was titled 'The concept of human dignity (Kevod Haberiyot) in Jewish law'. He has since published on this topic in essay form.

Kimche also contributed articles to the Orthodox Journal Le'ela, including two essays on the thought of the Maharal of Prague. He also contributed some letters to the editor in the Jewish Chronicle.

== Personal life ==
During his time at university, on a trip through Amsterdam, Kimche met Via Evers, the daughter of Hans Evers and Bloeme Evers-Emden. The two were married in Jerusalem in 1976. The couple have seven children. During their thirty-five year tenure in the rabbinate, Via Kimche worked alongside her husband as the Rebbitzen and spiritual leader of the Ner Yisrael community, in addition to her roles as a high school teacher, counsellor, and birth coach.

== Ner Yisrael Community ==
In 1983, Kimche and his family moved from Jerusalem back to London. He began his rabbinic career by directing a series of adult educational initiatives called Da'at, which involved giving classes to Jewish employees of corporations located in London's financial district. Within a year, Kimche was approached to become the founding rabbi of a small new synagogue in Hendon called Ner Yisrael. It swiftly grew to from ten families to over a hundred, and within two years outgrew its location in the LSJS building on Albert Road, and moved to its current premises on The Crest, Hendon. Ner Yisrael grew further, and soon became the flagship Modern-Orthodox Synagogue in the United Kingdom, with a strong emphasis on Religious-Zionism, cultural engagement, and universal learning. It currently counts approximately 400 families among its members.

Kimche gave a wide array of classes in his own synagogue and beyond on topics in Jewish philosophy, Halacha, Jewish history, Talmud, and the Bible. His grand sermons, delivered on two Sabbaths every year Shabbos HaGadol and Shabbos Shuva) routinely attracted hundreds of attendees.

In 2014, Rabbi Eliezer Zobin was appointed the Associate Rabbi. In January 2019, Rabbi Alan Kimche and Rebbetzin Via Kimche retired from their roles and relocated to Israel, after which Rabbi and Rebbetzin Zobin were appointed to succeed them as the community’s rabbinic leadership.

== North West London Eruv ==
In 1987, responding to the requests of his congregants, Kimche formed a committee to construct an Eruv for the North-West London Jewish community. The purpose of the Eruv was to allow observant Jews to carry within its boundaries on the Sabbath, and to allow those with limited personal mobility – such as families with young children, the elderly, and the handicapped – to enjoy unfettered mobility on the Sabbath. After encountering stiff opposition from some elements within London's Ultra-Orthodox community, Kimche and the Eruv Committee enlisted the support of Dayan Chanoch Ehrentreu and the London Beth Din, under whose auspices the Eruv currently operates.

Over the following fifteen years, the Eruv Committee, under Kimche's leadership, succeeded in constructing the Eruv despite intense opposition from elements both within and without the Jewish community. In 1991 the committee applied for planning permission from Barnet Council, engendering fierce debates on the subject which dragged on for several years. On February 24, 1993, Barnet Council's Town Planning and Research Committee rejected the proposal by a vote of 11–7, a decision that was eventually overturned by a representative of the Secretary of State for the Environment, whose report recommended the granting of permission to the Eruv Committee. However, due to a variety of technicalities, the installation of the Eruv was postponed numerous times.

On February 28, 2003, the London Beth-Din leased the six-mile tract of land from the London Metropolitan Police for one pound and proceeded to officially complete the construction of the Eruv, thereby bringing the fifteen year saga to its end. The following day, on the first Sabbath in which the Eruv was in use, Ner Yisrael synagogue hosted a large celebration, during which there was a spontaneous outbreak of singing and dancing.

In the two decades since, more than ten other eruvim have been constructed both in London and throughout the United Kingdom, most of which were granted comparatively swift and unobstructed approval.

== Later career and retirement ==
Kimche served as the principal of the Independent Jewish Day School in Hendon throughout his tenure in London. He also served on the board of directors of the UK branch of the Jewish National Fund from 2014 to 2020, and on the board of directors of Bayis Sheli, a residential home for disabled children, from 2013 to 2018.

In November 2013, Kimche penned a widely circulated letter that denounced the annual conference Limmud as an 'aberration', and stated that the topics and ideas discussed in the conference '[are] not Judaism'. Kimche argued that religious Jews should not attend a conference in which orthodox and non-orthodox views were given an equal platform. This caused a minor furore in the London community and beyond, with several prominent figures, such as Rabbis Samuel Lebens, Nathan Lopes Cardozo, Michael Harris, and Binyamin Lau all writing rebuttals to Kimche's views. Other public figures, such as Rabbi Zvi Lieberman and the journalist Jonathan Rosenblum, wrote in support of Kimche's letter. Three years later, Kimche wrote another letter strongly discouraging his congregants from participating in a partnership minyan. He stated that while those who participate in such gatherings generally do so for the right reasons, such a minyan is "sadly... not a Kosher experience" as it is "in violation of the spirit of the law".

In 2016, Kimche publicly denounced the controversial preacher Yosef Mizrachi, whose views on topics such as the Holocaust and Down Syndrome had sparked anger during his visit to London. Kimche went on record calling his brand of Judaism "popularised Kabbalah which appeals to gullible people."

In 2016, Kimche was named in the press as a possible candidate to succeed Jonathan Sacks as the Chief Rabbi of the United Kingdom. While Kimche himself confirmed that he was being considered as a candidate by the Chief Rabbinate Trust, the position was eventually filled by Rabbi Ephraim Mirvis.

In April 2019, at the age of 66, Kimche retired from his role at Ner Yisrael Synagogue, and moved to Israel with his wife. Kimche's associate rabbi, Eliezer Zobin, was appointed as his successor.

Upon his retirement, Kimche was honoured with a personal Sefer Torah donated by his synagogue. He was also honoured with a Festschrift, which included essays from prominent colleagues such as Rabbis Raphael Evers, Chanoch Ehrentreu, Mosheh Lichtenstein, and Shlomo Riskin.

After living for two years in Jerusalem, Kimche and his wife moved to Efrat in 2021.

Rabbi Kimche opened a morning learning program at Kollel Boker, located at the Hovevei Tzion Synagogue in Talbiya, Jerusalem. This program takes place on Monday and Wednesday mornings, and includes shuirim in Jewish Philosophy, Practical Halacha and Gemara and is broadcast live on Zoom - link: https://us02web.zoom.us/j/6139988776 and passcode: 12345

In March 2023, Rabbi Kimche was appointed interim Rabbi of Mizrachi Hebrew Congregation in Melbourne Australia, a position that he filled for two years.

Upon his return from Australia in 2025, he joined the Global Semichas Chaver Program (SCP), and started teaching this halacha program in partnership with the OU (Orthodox Union) on Thursday mornings at the Hovevei Tzion Synagogue in Jerusalem.
