= Chanoch Ehrentreu =

British rabbi (1932–2022)

Dayan Chanoch Ehrentreu

Personal life
- Born: 27 December 1932 Frankfurt, Hesse-Nassau, Prussia, Germany
- Died: 24 November 2022 (aged 89) London, England

Religious life
- Religion: Judaism

Chanoch Ehrentreu (27 December 1932 – 24 November 2022) was a German-born British Orthodox rabbi. He served for many years as the head of the London Beth Din in Great Britain (also known as The Court of the Chief Rabbi), serving the United Synagogue Community and those independent Orthodox Congregations that accept the authority of the Chief Rabbi of the United Hebrew Congregations of the Commonwealth. He retired from the post in December 2006.

== Early life ==
Chanoch Ehrentreu was born in Frankfurt am Main on 27 December 1932, to Rabbi Yisroel and Rebbitzen Bertha (née Jung) Ehrentreu. He was named after his paternal grandfather the Gaon HaRav Chanoch Ehrentreu, rabbi of Munich. When his family emigrated to the UK, his rabbi father became principal of Prestwich Jewish Day School. Young Chanoch went to school in Letchworth, and then, after the war, to Hasmonean High School, before going on to study at Gateshead Yeshiva.

== Sunderland ==
In 1960, he founded the Sunderland Kollel, which he headed until 1979. The Kollel moved to Gateshead in 2000.

== Manchester ==
Ehrentreu was Av Beth Din (Hebrew: Father [i.e., Head] of the Beth Din), and Communal Rabbi of Manchester from 1979 to 1984.

== London ==
Dayan Ehrentreu was appointed to the post of Rosh Beth Din in London by Lord Jakobovits in 1984. He was known as the Rosh Beth Din (rather than the traditional "Av" Beth Din) as the title of Av Beth Din is formally held by the Chief Rabbi. By dint of his workload as well as convention of his office, the Chief Rabbi does not regularly sit as a Dayan (Judge) on his own Beth Din or involve himself in its day to day work. Serving together with Ehrentreu during his tenure were Dayan Kaplan, Dayan Menachem Gelley, Dayan Abraham, Dayan Binstock, and Dayan Yitzhak Berger (Consultant). Dayan Ehrentreu retired from the Beth Din in January 2008 but continued his responsibilities as a consultant to the Beth Din, and became Av Beth Din of European Beth Din (Basel, Switzerland) 2008.

Ehrentreu was a leading authority in all areas of Jewish law, with particular expertise in the fields of Medical Ethics, Conversions and Kashrut.

In 2001, Ehrentreu appointed Yonason Abraham on the London Beth Din.

In March 2003, Ehrentreu successfully negotiated the construction of the North-West London eruv. He has presented to the House of Lords Select Committees on medical ethical issues, such as stem cell research and euthanasia. The Chief Rabbi commented when Ehrentreu announced his retirement, "The Dayan possesses a rare combination of authority, wisdom, compassion and understanding of our community."

Dayan Ehrentreu was the rabbinical European religious authority of Tiferes Bais Yisroel, an organisation founded to reinforce halachic standards for conversion. He served as a rabbinic authority on halachic matters on the continent.

== North West London eruv ==
In March 2003, after many years, Ehrentreu successfully negotiated the construction of an eruv in London. The eruv itself is an 11-mile enclosure in northwest London encompassing some of the city's Jewish neighbourhoods, including Golders Green and Hendon, plus much of Hampstead Garden Suburb and some of Finchley. Although established with the help of Rabbi Alan Kimche, Rabbi Jeremy Conway and others, its halachic validity was strongly contested by many other prominent London Rabbis.

Notwithstanding the controversy over the North West London eruv, its establishment set a precedent, with eruvs having now been established in Elstree/Borehamwood and Stanmore under the supervision of the London Beth Din and with Dayan Ehrentreu's guidance in Edgware.

Following Dayan Ehrentreu's lead, Eruvs have been planned for other Jewish communities throughout England, notably in Manchester, where the plans are supported by the leading Haredi authority, Rabbi Menachem Mendel Schneebalg of the Machzikei Hadass community. However, an attempt to construct an eruv in the Haredi community of Stamford Hill in 2008 was scuppered due to the fierce opposition of Rabbi Ephraim Padwa, the principal rabbinic authority for the UOHC, the umbrella organisation for London's Haredi community.

== The Louis Jacobs controversy ==
Ehrentreu was involved in controversy in the summer of 2003 when he banned Rabbi Dr. Louis Jacobs from taking part in a synagogue service on the Sabbath before his granddaughter's wedding. This led to heated debate in the Jewish community with some condemning the decision as petty and vindictive, whilst Ehrentreu and Rabbi Lord Jonathan Sacks argued that Jacobs could not appropriately say the blessing on being called up to read the Torah, because of his beliefs about its authorship.

== Personal life and death ==
Ehrentreu was married to Ruchie Sternbuch, sister of Gaavad Moshe Sternbuch and sister of the mother of Asher Arieli and Judy Soloveitchik (wife of Rabbi Dovid Soloveitchik).

Ehrentreu died in London on 24 November 2022, at the age of 89.

On 27 November 2022, Rabbi Eliezer Zobin, Senior Rabbi at Ner Yisrael Community in Hendon, delivered a eulogy and lecture in commemoration of the Dayan Ehrentreu, touching on his halachic breadth and expertise.

Ehrentreu's uncle was Rabbi Leo Jung.
