= James Aronson Award =

James Aronson Award for Social Justice Journalism
- Description: Award honoring original, written English-language reporting from U.S. media that highlights widespread injustices, human consequences, underlying causes, and possible reforms
- Country: United States
- Presented by: Hunter College

The James Aronson Award for Social Justice Journalism has been awarded since 1990 to honor Hunter College Professor, James Aronson. This award honors original, written English-language reporting from the U.S. media that brings to light widespread injustices, their human consequences, underlying causes, and possible reforms. This includes but is not limited to: discrimination, exploitation, violations of human rights or civil liberties, and environmental degradation. The Grambs Aronson Cartooning with a Conscience Award is named for his wife, (Blanche Mary) Grambs Aronson. The award, which was established in 1998, seeks to honor Hunter College students who demonstrate prowess in editorial cartooning in either print or digital media.

== List of winners ==
Year	Category	Winner	Work	Organization
2009		A.C. Thompson	"Katrina's Hidden Race War"	The Nation
2009		JoAnn Wypijewski	"Carnal Knowledge"	The Nation
2009		Mother Jones	"Climate Countdown,"	Mother Jones
2009		Nina Bernstein	coverage of immigration issues	The New York Times
2009	Cartooning	Jen Sorensen	"Slowpoke Comics"
2008	Lifetime Achievement	Les Payne		Newsday
2008		E.J. Graff	"The Lie We Love"	Foreign Policy
2008		Joseph Huff-Hannon	"Facing Foreclosure"	The Indypendent
2008		Nick Turse	"A My Lai a Month"	The Nation
2008	Blog Award	Danny Schechter		NewsDissector.org.
2008	Cartooning	Ed Stein
2007		Brian Grow, Robert Berner, Keith Epstein	"The Poverty Business"	BusinessWeek
2007		Helen Benedict	"The Private War of Women Soldiers"	Salon.com
2007		Dahr Jamail	Iraq reporting	DahrJamailIraq.com
2007		Jeremy Scahill	"Blackwater Worldwide"	The Nation
2007		Matt O'Brien, Ray Chavez	"The Mayan Way"	Daily Review of Hayward, California
2007	Cartooning	Marc Simont		Lakeville [CT] Journal
2006	Lifetime Achievement	Amy Goodman
2006		Julia Whitty	"The Fate of the Ocean"	Mother Jones
2006		Corine Hegland	"Guantanamo's Grip"	National Journal
2006		Judy Pasternak	"Blighted Homeland"	Los Angeles Times
2006		Tim Collie, Mike Stocker, Jim Amon	"Orphans of AIDS"	South Florida-Sentinel
2006	Cartooning	John Sherffius		Boulder Daily Camera
2005	Lifetime Achievement	Molly Ivins
2005	Lifetime Achievement	Anthony Lewis
2005		Gary Fields		Wall Street Journal
2005		Kevin Fagan, Brant Ward		San Francisco Chronicle
2005		Tracie McMillan		City Limits magazine
2005	Blogs	Juan Cole	"Informed Comment"
2005	Cartooning	Kirk Anderson
2004		Seymour M. Hersh	"Abu Graib"	The New Yorker
2004		Naomi Klein		Harper's
2004		Frank Rich		The New York Times
2004		Peter G. Gosselin	"New Deal"	Los Angeles Times
2004	Cartooning	Bill Day		Memphis Commercial-Appeal
2003		Paul Krugman	political commentary	The New York Times & The Nation
2003		Jake Bernstein & Dave Mann	"The Rise of the Machine"	The Texas Observer
2003		John Donnelly, Colin Nickerson, David Filipov, Raja Mishra	"Lives Lost"	The Boston Globe
2003		David Barstow & Lowell Bergman	"Dangerous Business" & "When Workers Die"	The New York Times
2003		Mohamad Bazzi	Iraq War	Newsday
2003	Cartooning	Mark Fiore	Animated Political Cartooning
2002		William Finnegan	"Leasing the Rain"	The New Yorker
2002		Seth Rosenfeld	FBI & Clark Kerr	San Francisco Chronicle
2002		Rebekah Denn	African-American and white students	Seattle Post-Intelligencer
2002		Katy Reckdahl	mistreatment of the homeless	Gambit Weekly
2002	Cartooning	Ted Rall	"Generalissimo El Busho"
2001		William Greider	"regulatory takings" movement	The Nation
2001		Dolores Barclay, Todd Lewan, Allen G. Breed	"Torn From the Land"	Associated Press
2001	Lifetime Achievement	Robert Sherrill
2001	Cartooning	Dan Perkins	"Tom Tomorrow"
2001	Lifetime Achievement	Edward Sorel
2000		Ellen E. Schultz	"pension-paring spree"	Wall Street Journal
2000		Dale Maharidge, Michael Williamson	"This American Is Hungry"	George magazine
2000		Robert Scheer		Los Angeles Times & The Nation
2000		Juan Gonzalez		New York Daily News
2000	Cartooning	Steve Brodner	"art journalism"
1999		Sasha Abramsky	"When They Get Out"	Atlantic Monthly
1999		Larry Johnson, Dan DeLong	"Life and Death in Iraq"	Seattle Post-Intelligencer
1999		Marcus Stern, Dana Wilkie, Dori Meinert, Toby Eckert	"America's Immigration Dilemma"	Copley News Service
1999	Lifetime Achievement	Jules Feiffer
1999	Cartooning	Art Spiegelman		New Yorker magazine
1998		Newsday	"The Health Divide"	Newsday
1998		Christopher Cook	"Plucking Workers"	The Progressive
1998		Donald L. Barlett, James B. Steele	corporate welfare	Time
1997	Commentary	Bob Herbert	police brutality	The New York Times
1997	Environmental Reporting	Karl Grossman
1997	Socioeconomic Reporting	Marc Kaufman & Dan Stets	Philadelphia Board of City Trusts	Philadelphia Inquirer
1997	International Reporting	Eyal Press, Jennifer Washburn, Benn Terrall & Amy Goodman	U.S.-Indonesia Society & Suharto	The Progressive
1996		Charles M. Sennott	"Armed for Profit: The Selling of U.S. Weapons"	Boston Globe
1996		Gary Webb	"Dark Alliance"	San Jose Mercury News
1996	Honorable Mention	Greg Davis	Maine's DeCoster Egg Farms.
1995		Barry Bearak	"The Waning Power of Workers"	Los Angeles Times
1995	Honorable mention	Nancy Stancill	"Paid in Pain"	Charlotte Observer
1995	Lifetime Achievement	John Oakes		The New York Times
1994		Allen Nairn	Haiti	The Nation
1994	Honorable mention	Tony Horwitz	"9 to Nowhere: The Grim Side of '90s Growth Jobs"	Wall Street Journal
1994	Honorable mention	Mike Hudson	"Robbin' the Hood: How Wall Street Takes from the Poor and Gives to the Rich"	Mother Jones
1993		Eileen Welsome	"The Plutonium Experiment"	Albuquerque Tribune
1993	Honorable mention	Paul Salopek	"“La Migra: The Border Patrol's Wall of Silence"	Texas Observer
1993	Honorable mention	New Orleans Times-Picayune	"The Myth of Race"
1992		Mike Davis	"L.A.: Burning All Illusions"	The Nation
1992	Honorable mention	Celia Dugger	foster care, welfare and people in poverty	The New York Times
1992	Honorable mention	Robert Weissman	"The Corporate Rap Sheet"	Multinational Monitor
1991		Gloria Emerson	"Gaza: A Year in the Intifada: A Personal Account from an Occupied Land."
1991	Honorable mention	Ellen Ray, William Schaap	press assumptions and practices	Lies of Our Times
1991	Honorable mention	Peter Sussman	Lompoc Federal Penitentiary	The San Francisco Chronicle
1990		Kathy Kadane	CIA's role in Indonesia	State News Service, The Washington Post
1990	Honorable Mention	Lawrence Wechsler, Alan Nairn, Peter Kornbluh, William Finnegan	"Talk of the Town" pieces on Central America	New Yorker
