= Sasha Abramsky =

British author

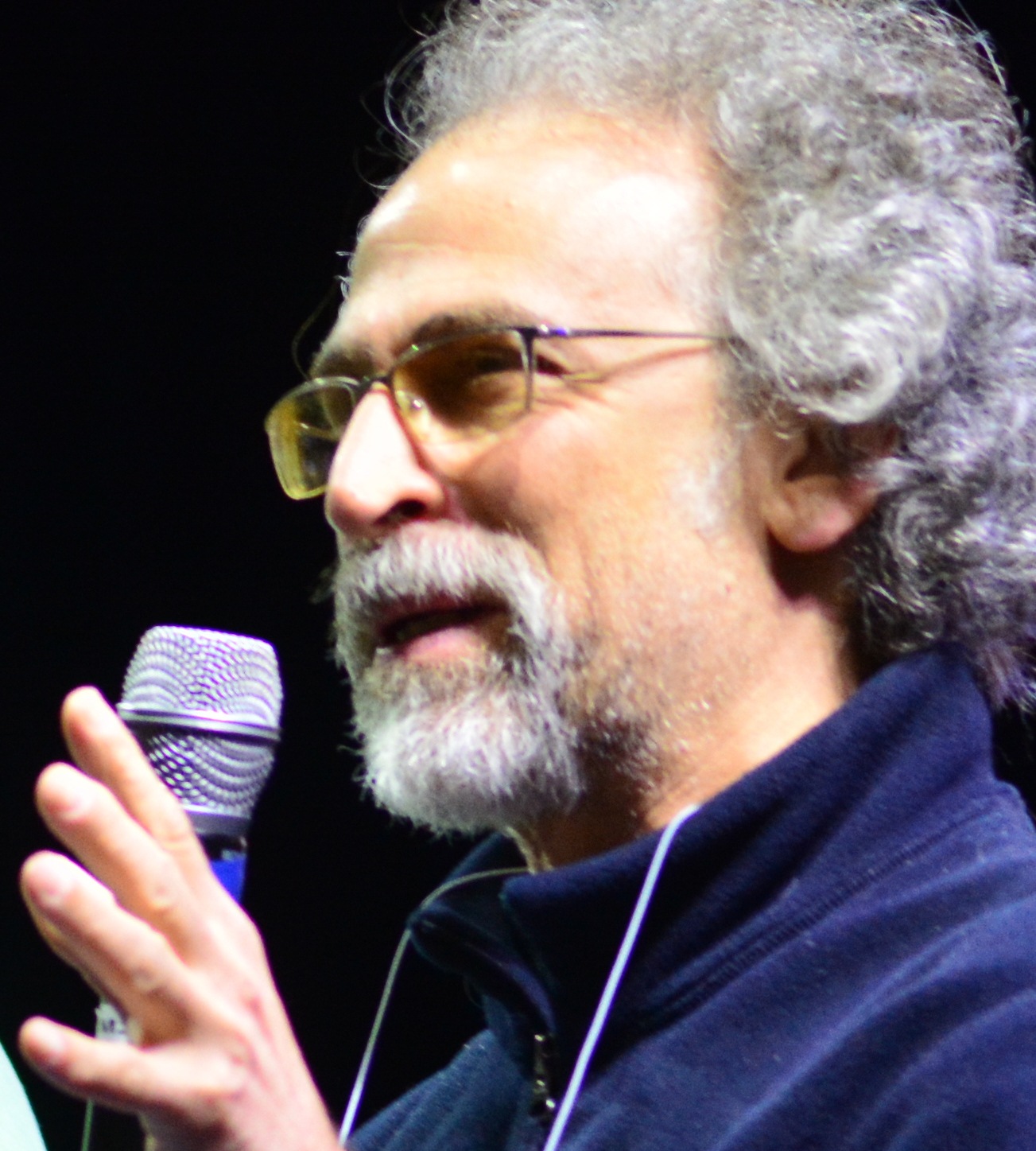
- Sasha Abramsky, 2023
- Born: 4 April 1972 (age 54)
- Education: Balliol College, Oxford (B.A., 1993); Columbia University Graduate School of Journalism (M.A.)
- Occupations: Journalist, author

Sasha Abramsky (born 4 April 1972) is a British-born freelance journalist and author who now lives in the United States. Abramsky writes the weekly "Authoritarian Watch" column for The Nation magazine (since January 2026). His work has appeared in many other publications, including The Atlantic Monthly, New York, The Village Voice, and Rolling Stone. He is a senior fellow at the American liberal think tank Demos, and a lecturer in the University of California, Davis's University Writing Program.

== Early life and education ==
Abramsky was born in England to a Jewish family and was raised in London, in what Debbie Arrington described as "an accomplished and bookish family". He is the son of Jack Abramsky, a mathematician, and the grandson of Chimen Abramsky, a professor of Jewish studies at University College London, who was himself the son of Yehezkel Abramsky, a prominent Orthodox rabbi.

Abramsky earned a B.A. from Balliol College, Oxford in politics, philosophy and economics in 1993. He then traveled to the United States, where he earned a master's degree from the Columbia University Graduate School of Journalism. In 2000, he received a Crime and Communities Media Fellowship from the Open Society Foundations.

== Bibliography ==
=== Books ===
- Hard Time Blues: How Politics Built a Prison Nation. Thomas Dunne Books / St. Martins Press, January 2002 ISBN 0312268114
- Conned: How Millions Went to Prison, Lost the Vote, And Helped Send George W. Bush to the White House. The New Press, April 2006 ISBN 978-1565849662
- American Furies: Crime, Punishment, and Vengeance in the Age of Mass Imprisonment. Beacon Press (MA), May 2007 ISBN 978-0807042236
- Ill-equipped: U.S. Prisons and Offenders with Mental Illness. Human Rights Watch, June 2007 ISBN 978-1564322906
- Breadline USA: The Hidden Scandal of American Hunger and How to Fix It. Polipoint Press, June 2009 ISBN 978-0981709116
- Inside Obama's Brain. Portfolio, December 2009 ISBN 978-1591843023
- The American Way of Poverty: How the Other Half Still Lives. Nation Books, September 2013 ISBN 978-1568587264
- The House of Twenty Thousand Books, a memoir of his grandfather, Chimen Abramsky. London : Halban, June 2014 ISBN 9781905559640
- Jumping at Shadows: The Triumph of Fear and the End of the American Dream, a study of irrational fear in the United States. Nation Books, September 2017 ISBN 978-1568585192

== Awards ==
In 2000, Abramsky received the James Aronson Award for his Atlantic Monthly article "When They Get Out". In 2016, his memoir The House of Twenty Thousand Books, which describes the lives of his grandparents Chimen and Miriam Abramsky, received an honorable mention for that year's Sophie Brody Medal.

== Personal life ==
As of 2023, Abramsky lives in San Diego, California with his wife, Marissa Ventura, a Communications Strategist, writer, and editor at University of California, San Francisco.

Abramsky has a son and daughter from a previous marriage.
