= Lev L'Achim =

Israeli Jewish educational organization

Lev L'Achim (Hebrew: לב לאחים, "heart for brothers"), or P'eylim Lev L'Achim, is a Jewish educational organization operating in Israel. It has an American non-profit 501(c)3 affiliate of the same name.

== Work ==
Lev L'Achim's programs include: enrolling Jewish children in religious schools, operating Torah learning centers for teens and adults, assisting immigrants, shelters for abused women, big-brother programs, and drop-out prevention. The organization has also assisted in rescuing Jewish Israeli women held in captivity in the Palestinian territories and participated in opposing Christian missionary work in Israel.

== Controversy ==
In 2009, the U.S. State Department, in its annual International Religious Freedom Report, noted that Israeli "society's attitudes toward missionary activities and conversion generally were negative. Most Jews were opposed to missionary activity directed at Jews, and some were hostile to Jewish converts to Christianity." In that context, the report named Lev L'Achim as one of the groups of "concern" for their work against Christian missionaries operating in Israel.

== See also ==
- Shuvu Chazon Avrohom
- Judaism in Israel
- Missionary
- Proselytization and counter-proselytization of Jews
- Lehava
