= Celia W. Dugger =

American journalist

Celia Williams Dugger
- Born: July 3, 1958 (age 68); Austin, Texas, U.S.
- Occupation: journalist
- Notable credit: The New York Times
- Spouse: Barry Bearak
- Children: Max, 36 and Sam, 31
- Family: Ronnie Dugger, father

Celia Williams Dugger (born July 3, 1958, in Austin, Texas) is an American journalist who is deputy science editor of The New York Times.

Along with her husband Barry Bearak, currently a New York Times staff writer and visiting professor at Columbia University, Dugger served as co-bureau chief of The New York Times South Asia bureau in New Delhi from 1998 to 2002. From 2008 to 2011, she and Bearak became bureau chiefs in Johannesburg, South Africa.

Ms. Dugger is the daughter of Jean and Ronnie Dugger, the founding editor of the influential Texas Observer.

== Awards ==
In 2006, Celia Dugger and Donald McNeil Jr. won the Overseas Press Club award for best international reporting in the print medium showing a concern for the human condition, for their series "Diseases on the Brink." The same series was also honored with a Robert F. Kennedy Journalism Award that year.

She has won the George Polk Award for Journalism twice.

In 1992 she won a James Aronson Award honorable mention.

== Personal life ==
Dugger and Bearak have two sons, Sam and Max. Celia Dugger has traveled all over Africa, South America and Asia covering poverty and health.
