= Nigel Peters =

British judge (born 1952)

Nigel Peters KC
- Royal coat of arms of the United Kingdom

Circuit Judge
- Incumbent
- Assumed office 2012
- Monarchs: Elizabeth II; Charles III

Personal details
- Born: Nigel Melvin Peters; November 14, 1952 (age 73) London
- Education: University of Leicester
- Occupation: Circuit Judge
- Profession: Barrister-at-law

Nigel Melvin Peters KC (born 14 November 1952), styled His Honour Judge Peters KC, is a Circuit Judge in England and Wales.

== Early life ==
Born at Denmark Hill, London, son of Sidney Peters, he was educated at Hasmonean Grammar School and Leicester University, where he read Law, graduating with the degree of LLB.

== Legal career ==
Peters was called to the Bar in 1976 and was appointed a Queen's Counsel in 1997. He became a Recorder in 1998 and a Circuit Judge in 2012. He has been a Bencher of Lincoln's Inn since 2006.

On Monday 5 August 2013, Peters, sitting in the Crown Court at Snaresbrook, sentenced Neil Wilson, aged 41, who pleaded guilty to sexual activity with a 13-year-old girl, to a suspended sentence of imprisonment, causing concern in his sentencing remarks when quoting the opening by the prosecution that the girl had contributed by being a "sexual predator". Attorney-General Dominic Grieve QC referred the sentence for review by the Court of Appeal which judged it to be unduly lenient and revised Wilson's sentence to an immediate two-year prison term. The Judicial Conduct Investigations Office was compelled to follow up a parliamentary complaint about HHJ Nigel Peters' sentencing options, apropos "perceived" erroneous consideration of the girl's alleged appearance and behaviour as mitigating factors, but all such complaints relating to the matter were summarily dismissed (see JCIO website - News 1 July 2014).

== Personal life ==
A cricket enthusiast, Peters lives in London NW1. A longstanding member of Marylebone Cricket Club and Chairman of MCC's membership committee, he also belongs to the Garrick Club.
