= Shuvu Chazon Avrohom =

- שובו חזון אברהם
- Named after: Rabbi Avrohom Pam
- Established: 1991
- Founder: Rabbi Avrohom Pam
- Type: Nonprofit
- Purpose: Kiruv
- Headquarters: 60 Rashi Street, Jerusalem, Israel
- Locations: Jerusalem, Israel; Brooklyn, NY, United States
- Coordinates: 31°47′16.8″N 35°12′35.6″E
- Region served: Israel
- Methods: Schools, summer camps, after-school programs
- Affiliations: Orthodox Judaism
- Budget: $27 million (2021)
- Website: shuvuusa.org

Shuvu Chazon Avrohom, often referred to by its former names Shuvu or The United Fund for the Education of Russian Immigrant Children in Israel, is an Orthodox Jewish kiruv organization in Israel. It was founded by Rabbi Avrohom Yaakov Pam as a network of schools, summer camps, and after school programs for immigrant children from the Former Soviet Union. Its enrollment has since expanded to include many Israelis from birth as well as immigrants from all over the world.

== Name ==
"Shuvu" is the Hebrew word for "return", and since the organization's goal is to return unaffiliated Jews to their Jewish roots, it was named as such. After the death of Shuvu's founder, Rabbi Avrohom Pam, the words "Chazon Avrohom", Hebrew for "Vision of Avrohom", were added to its name.

== Background ==
Throughout the years of the Soviet Union, the government enacted several anti-religious campaigns. Besides for the thousands of religious leaders brutally murdered during the Red Terror and the Great Purge, numerous laws were passed to quash the observance and transmission of religion. For example, in 1929, high taxes were placed on all religious organizations; all citizens under the age of 18 were forbidden in partaking in religious gatherings and ceremonies; and a law was passed making the teaching of religion in schools illegal. Through the religious suppression of over seventy years, Judaism barely survived in the Soviet Union.

After the fall of the Soviet Union, there was an influx of Jewish immigration to Israel from the Former Soviet Union, with over a thousands Jewish immigrants arriving daily. The international Orthodox Jewish community therefore took responsibility to bring the secular Russians back to Jewish observance.

== History ==
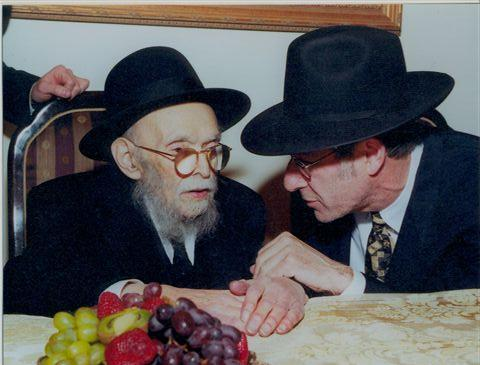
Rabbi Avrohom Pam on the left

At the Agudath Israel of America Convention in 1990 in Parsippany-Troy Hills, New Jersey, Rabbi Avrohom Pam spoke about the situation of the Russian emigrants to Israel. "The future of Klal Yisrael (the Jewish people) is our hands," he declared, and said that if a proper Jewish school system for the Russian children wouldn't be set up soon, the thousands of emigrants would quickly assimilate into secular Israeli culture. On the same day as his address, a meeting was convened with the attendance of what would become Shuvu's leadership, namely Max Knopf, Sheldon Beren, and Avraham (Abe) Biderman. Biderman was named the chairman of the organization. Shortly after the convention, Rabbi Pam wrote:

...For the past seventy years there could be no expectations that Soviet Jews would provide their children with a Torah education. Any attempt to do so could have been punishable by death. Now, however, that as many as a million Soviet Jews can be expected in Eretz Yisroel, what is to prevent them from enrolling their children in a Torah school? Only our indifference to their plight and our inaction in meeting this pressing, historic need will seal their fate. After all, who, if not we, recognizes, knows, and understands the nature of the choice before them?

=== Preliminary trip to Israel ===
After a meeting of Agudath Israel's Moetzes Gedolei HaTorah, it was decided to send a group to Israel to meet with the Russian immigrants and see if they would be receptive to Orthodox Jewish education. After speaking to many Israeli and Russian activists and hundreds of Russian immigrants, including children, the emissaries came to the conclusion that the immigrants were in fact receptive. They then turned to the leading rabbis in Israel, Rabbi Elazar Menachem Man Shach, Rabbi Shlomo Zalman Auerbach, and Rabbi Moshe Yehoshua Hager of the Vizhnitz Hasidic court, who advised them to reach out to the immigrant children in particular, who had not yet been given a complete atheist education. They hoped that having the children learn Judaism in school would influence their homes as well. During their trip, the group visited Orthodox rabbis and activists throughout the country who had already started reaching out to the immigrants but who didn't have the necessary funds to do anything drastic. They also visited a few Chinuch Atzmai schools that already had Russian children enrolled in them.

=== Turnout ===
Although the first Shuvu classes were given in travel trailers, the organization has since expanded drastically to include 77 schools and after school programs throughout Israel as well as fifteen summer camps. In 2016, Dayan Yonason Abraham was appointed as nasi (president) of the organization, although it seems he resigned shortly after in 2019. Shuvu's US division (essentially a fundraiser) has since adopted a "Vaad Hanesius," i.e. a "Council of Presidency," namely Rabbis Reuven Feinstein (of Yeshiva of Staten Island) and Elya Brudny (of the Mir Yeshiva), to serve at its helm. In 2022, Shuvu saw a boost in enrollment with the arrival of new refugees from Ukraine, who had fled the Russian invasion.

Rabbi Pam remained involved in the organization throughout the years. After his death, its name was changed from "Shuvu" to "Shuvu Chazon Avrohom" in his memory.

== Methodology ==
Shuvu's methodology is to offer a high level of secular studies aside from the Judaic studies, convincing parents to send their children.

This method was backed up by a poll done by Israeli pollster Rafi Smith, who was commissioned by Shuvu to conduct a poll of secular Israeli parents on whether high-level secular studies would convince them to enroll their children in Shuvu schools. Three quarters of those polled were completely secular (hiloni) and nine percent identified as traditional (masorti); altogether 90% didn't observe Shabbat. The poll revealed that 58% of non-religious parents wanted more Jewish studies than secular or an equal amount. When asked if they would enroll their children in a school within fifteen minutes of their home that had excellent secular studies, Judaic studies, and an emphasis on discipline and preventing violence, twelve percent said that they would enroll their children, and thirty-eight percent said they probably would. The poll also showed parents' satisfaction in their children's schooling at Shuvu, which at times was better than in the secular school system.

== See also ==
- Baal teshuva
- Independent Education System (Israel)
- Jewish fundamentalism
- Lev L'Achim
- Orthodox Judaism outreach
