= Alasdair Liddell =

Alasdair Liddell CBE

Department of Health Director of Planning

Personal details
- Born: Alasdair Donald MacDuff Liddell; 15 January 1949 Pitlochry, Perthshire, Scotland
- Died: 31 December 2012 (aged 63) London, England
- Spouse: Jenny Abramsky (m. 1976)
- Children: 2
- Education: Balliol College, Oxford

Alasdair Donald MacDuff Liddell CBE (15 January 1949 – 31 December 2012) was one of the architects of Britain's health strategy in the 1990s. As Director of Planning at the Department of Health (1994–2000), he led the process of setting national priorities for the National Health Service (NHS).

== Education ==
Liddell was educated at Fettes College in Edinburgh, and Balliol College, Oxford (1967–70). He moved from the voluntary sector to health management and as chief of the East Anglian Regional Health Authority he pioneered the Rubber Windmill, a simulation involving large numbers of clinicians, health managers, journalists and others over several days, which tested (and found wanting) the government's plans to introduce internal markets to the NHS. The Windmill was highly influential and led to changes in the government's approach. Liddell's simulation idea has since been used repeatedly to assess the impact of the market-based reforms, notably for the King's Fund in 2007.

== Career ==
He resigned, reputedly over policy differences with ministers, and subsequently acted as an advisor to health charities like the King's Fund (where he was a Senior Associate) and to health sector companies and consultancies. He was senior counsel to Bell Pottinger and was non-executive deputy chairman of Healthcare Locums plc, effectively taking executive responsibility in early 2011 when the company was found to have financial irregularities leading to the suspension of the company's chief executive Kate Bleasedale.

He was promoted by Ken Jarrold to Director of Planning. As Director of Planning at the Department of Health Liddell had Board level responsibility for strategy, NHS information and IT, NHS Communications, and a number of key policy areas. After the 1997 election he led the team supporting Ministers in laying the foundations for much of current government policy for the NHS. He was awarded a CBE in the 1997 Birthday Honours for services to the NHS.

He died at age 63 of an aneurysm he suffered while visiting friends in London.

== Family ==
Liddell married Jenny Abramsky in 1976. They had two children.

== Works ==
- Co-authored the report Technology in the NHS: Transforming the patient's experience of care. 23 October 2008.
- Co-authored Windmill 2009: NHS response to the financial storm. 2009.
