= Jenny Abramsky =

British radio personality and BBC executive (born 1946)

Dame Jenny Abramsky GBE
- Born: Jennifer Gita Abramsky; 7 October 1946 (age 80); England
- Education: University of East Anglia (BA)
- Occupations: Journalist, media producer
- Known for: Director of Audio and Music, BBC
- Title: Chancellor of the University of East Anglia
- Spouse: Alasdair Liddell (m. 1976; died 2012)
- Children: 2
- Father: Chimen Abramsky

Dame Jennifer Gita Abramsky GBE (born 7 October 1946) is a British media producer, philanthropist and Chancellor of the University of East Anglia. She was chairperson of the UK's National Heritage Memorial Fund (NHMF). Until her retirement from the BBC, Abramsky was its most senior female employee; she was Director of Audio and Music.

== Early life and education ==
Born to a Jewish family, she was the daughter of Miriam, a social worker and former communist who was on Brick Lane during Oswald Mosley's fascist marches, and Chimen Abramsky, a professor of Jewish studies and rare book expert. One of her grandfathers was Yehezkel Abramsky, a prominent Orthodox rabbi and scholar who headed the London Beth Din rabbinical court for 17 years.

In her youth, Abramsky wished to become a ballerina, going so far as to study with the Rambert Dance Company; even attempting to join the Royal Ballet but failing supposedly owing to her short stature of only 5 ft. She was educated at Holland Park Comprehensive School, London, and then completed her education at the University of East Anglia, where she received a Bachelor of Arts degree in English.

== Career ==
In 1969, she joined the BBC as a programmes operations assistant, and in 1973 was appointed as a producer of The World at One. She became the first woman editor of the agenda-setting Today programme, ran the first Gulf War Radio 4 News FM service, and went on to launch Britain's first continuous news and sport radio station, BBC Radio 5 Live, before launching the television channel BBC News 24. She launched the BBC's online news website, news.bbc.co.uk. She was named Director of BBC Radio in January 1999 and was subsequently promoted to the BBC's executive board with overall responsibility for BBC Radios 1, 2, 3, 4, and 5 Live and the BBC's digital radio stations 1Xtra, BBC 7, 6 Music, 5 Live Sports Extra and the Asian Network; the three BBC orchestras based in England; and the Proms. In 2006, she became Director of Audio and Music – adding online services, audio on demand and podcasting to her remit of broadcast radio.

She had an annual programming budget of £236 million (about US$475m) and a staff of 1,681. Under her leadership, by the first three months of 2007 the BBC's radio stations had an audience share of 56.6 percent – compared with the 13.9 percent of listeners shared by all commercial radio broadcasters – and a reach of almost 33.5 million people – a record, according to Guardian newspaper (9 July 2007). The paper listed Abramsky as the 18th most powerful person in the UK's media, though she had slipped from No. 11 in the paper's 2006 ranking.

=== Post-BBC ===
It was announced in June 2008 that Abramsky was retiring from the BBC after 39 years of service, to be replaced by Tim Davie. After leaving the BBC she began focusing her efforts on preserving cultural sites. She currently serves on the board of trustees for the UK's largest youth drama festival, the Shakespeare Schools Festival and is a Fellow of The Radio Academy. She is Chair of Trustees of National Life Stories and of the Royal Academy of Music. She previously served as Chair of the Heritage Lottery Fund (now The National Lottery Heritage Fund) as well.

In 2016, she was appointed to the trustees of the Canal & River Trust, the charity responsible for 2000 miles of canals and rivers in England and Wales. In 2017, she was appointed to be the deputy chair of the Canal & River Trust. She is a member of the Audit and Risk Committee, and is chair of the appointments committee. In April 2024, she was appointed as the Chancellor of the University of East Anglia.

== Personal life ==
Abramsky married Alasdair Liddell, a former head of planning for the NHS, in 1976. They had two children and were married until his death from an aneurism on 31 December 2012.

== Honours ==
Abramsky was elevated from Commander of the Order of the British Empire (CBE) to Dame Commander of the Order of the British Empire (DBE) in the 2009 New Year Honours. She was further elevated to Dame Grand Cross of the Order of the British Empire (GBE) in the 2024 Birthday Honours.

She was also one of the first nine people to be inducted into the Digital Radio Hall of Fame.

== See also ==
- List of British Jews

== Notes ==
Media offices
Preceded by Position established	Editor of Today; 1986–1987	Succeeded by Phil Harding
Preceded by ?	BBC Director of Audio and Music; 2006–2008	Succeeded by Tim Davie
