= Immanuel College, Bushey =

Coordinates: 51°38′28″N 0°20′04″W

The Charles Kalms – Henry Ronson Immanuel College

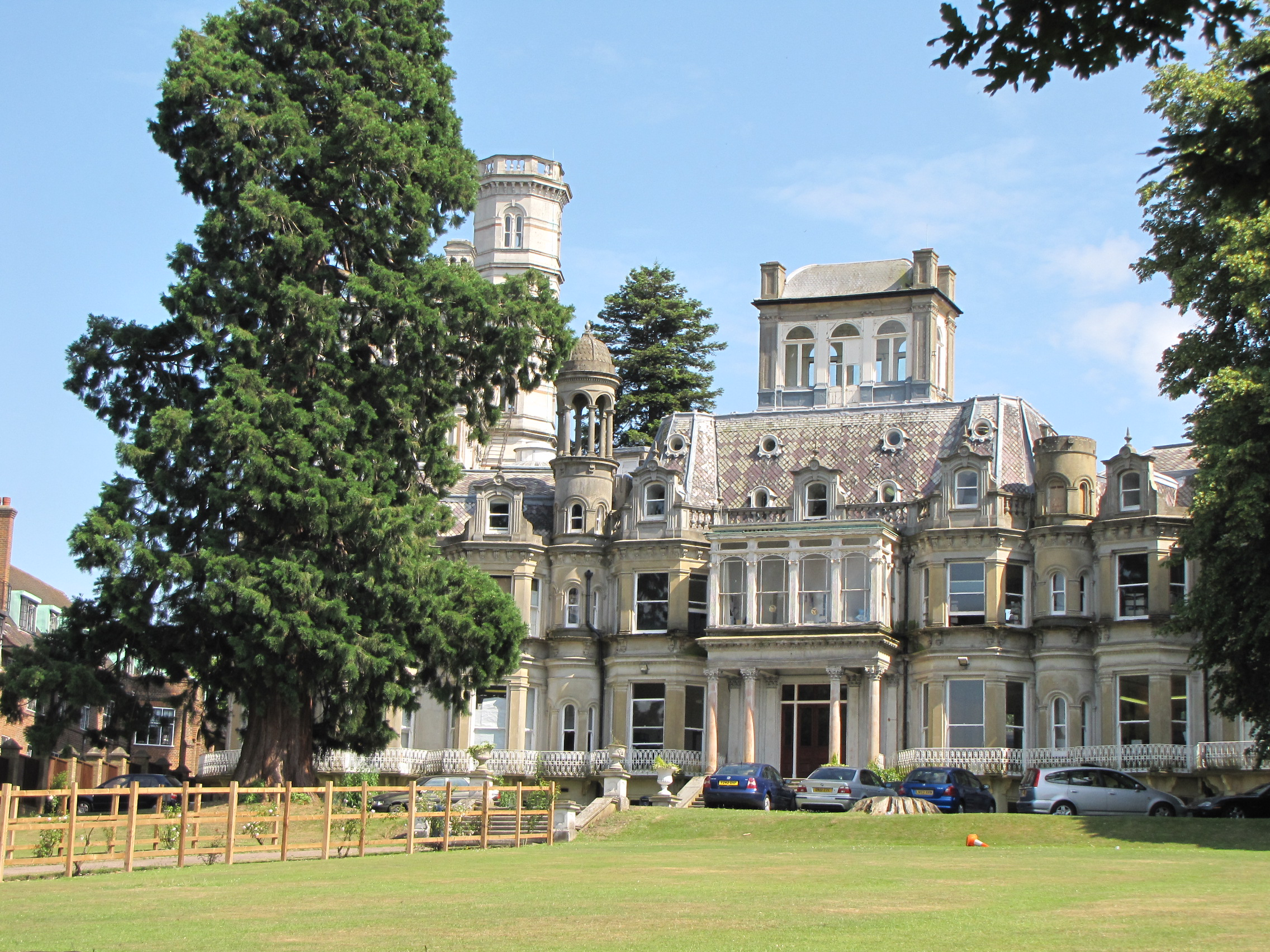
- The school in 2010

Location
- 87–91 Elstree Road; Bushey, Hertfordshire, WD23 4EB; United Kingdom

Information
- Type: Private day school
- Motto: Torah im Derech Eretz
- Religious affiliation: Modern Orthodox Jewish
- Established: 1990
- Founder: Lord Jakobovits
- Local authority: Hertfordshire
- Department for Education URN: 117657 Tables
- Ofsted: Reports
- Chairman of governors: Daniel Levy
- Headmaster: Daniel Endlar
- Staff: 158
- Gender: Mixed-sex education
- Age: 11 to 19
- Enrolment: 360 (2026)
- Capacity: 780
- Publication: College Life, Slice of Life, The Bridge
- Telephone: + 44 (0)20 8950 0604
- Affiliations: HMC
- Website: immanuelcollege.co.uk

Immanuel College is a private co-educational Jewish day school in Bushey, Hertfordshire, on the outskirts of North London. It is a member of the Headmasters' and Headmistresses' Conference.

== History and aims ==
Immanuel College (formally named The Charles Kalms – Henry Ronson Immanuel College) was founded by Chief Rabbi Immanuel Jakobovits in 1990 to affirm Orthodox Jewish values and provide secular education. It was named in honour of Jakobovits.

The Immanuel College Preparatory School opened in autumn 2011 with a Reception class. In December 2024, it was announced that the prep school would close at the end of the 2024–25 school year in response to increased financial pressures.

A report by The Sutton Trust placed Immanuel College in the top 2% of schools nationally in terms of its students' success in gaining admission to the 13 most competitive research universities.

== Grounds and facilities ==
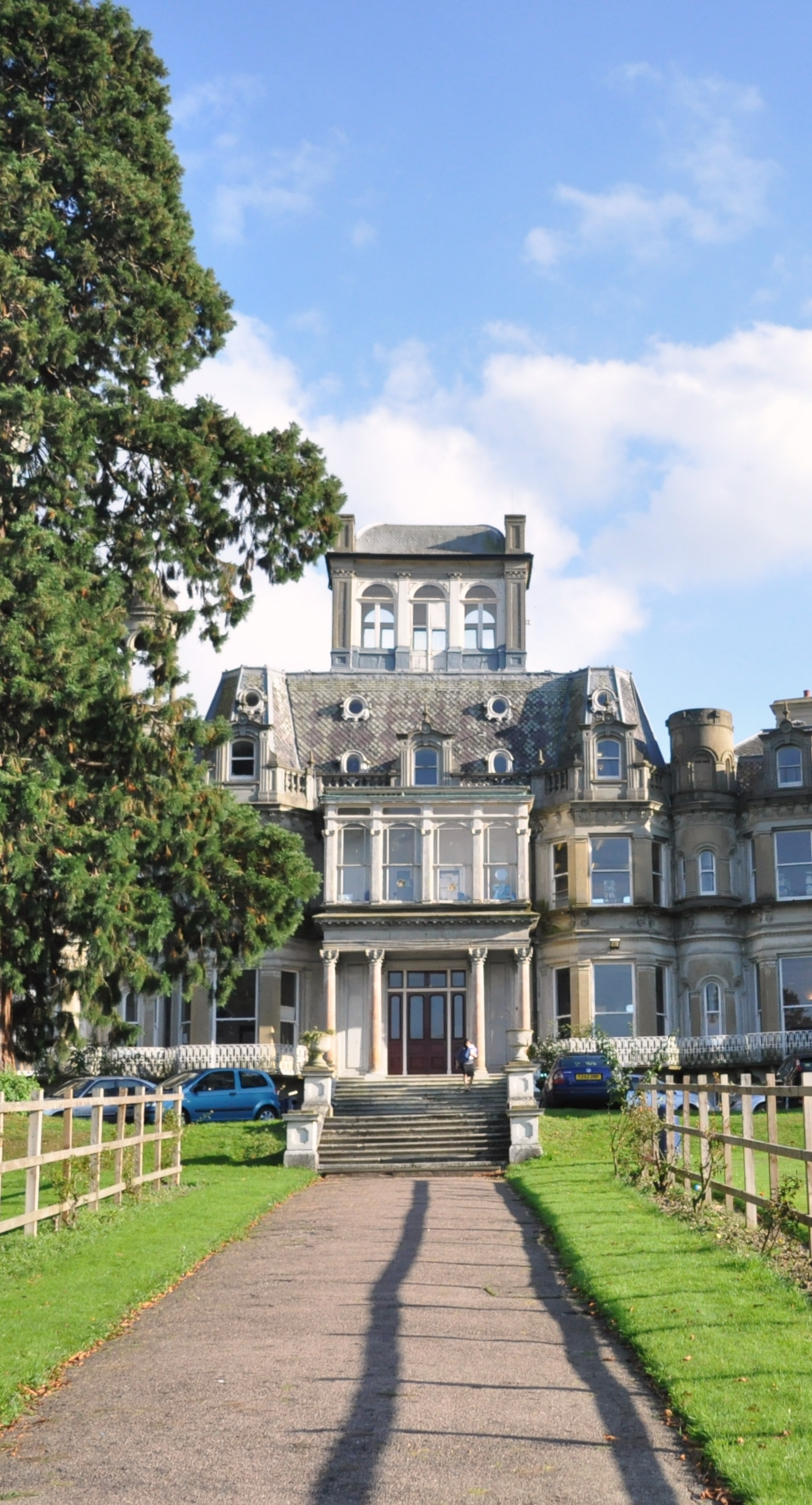
View of Caldecote Towers from the Rose Garden

The school is situated on the 11-acre grounds of Caldecote Towers, adjacent to a Dominican convent, and on the former site of the Rosary Priory Catholic girls' school.

== Fees ==
Admissions fees 2024–2025

Registration fee (non-refundable) £240 (including VAT @ 20%)

Acceptance deposit (Year 6+) £2500

Senior School £23,859 (annual), £7,953 (termly)

Fees stated are exclusive of VAT. The Government has added VAT to fees as of 1 January 2025. The school provides over £200,000 in bursaries to families.

== Notable staff & alumni ==
From 2014-2023, Rabbi Eliezer Zobin served as Principal at the school, and is reported to have showed a broad and sensitive understanding of contemporary issues facing Jewish youth.
