= Corine Hegland =

American journalist

Corine Hegland is a Washington DC–based journalist.

== Education ==
Hegland obtained her degree from Macalester College in St. Paul, Minnesota. She was also a former Harry S. Truman Scholar.

== Career ==
Hegland works for National Journal for "Guantanamo's Grip." One of her most important pieces of work was an investigation on federal records that "most of the men weren’t known terrorists, weren’t captured on the battlefield, and weren’t even accused of fighting the United States." However, most of her work focuses on foreign policy. She began working for National Journal in 2001 after her internship with the Washington Monthly was over. Hegland also served as a policy advisor for the U.S. Department of Transportation.

== Awards ==
- 2006 James Aronson Award for Social Justice Journalism.

The award is granted by Hunter College in New York City. Hegland won her award for a series of articles on the captives held in extrajudicial detention in the United States Guantanamo Bay detention camps, in Cuba:
