= David-Hillel Ruben =

American philosopher (born 1943)

David-Hillel Ruben (born 1943) is an American philosopher, now professor emeritus at Birkbeck, University of London.

== Life ==
Ruben was born on 23 July 1943 in Chicago. He gained his PhD in Philosophy at Harvard University (1971). He had previously held posts at the Universities of Edinburgh and Glasgow, Essex University, The City University London, and the London School of Economics. He served as Founding Director of NYU's campus programme in London.

In 2011, Ruben resigned from the Universities and Colleges Union (UCU) in protest at their stance on anti-Semitism.

== Works ==
Ruben's research relates to the philosophy of the social sciences, metaphysics, and the philosophy of action.

=== Selected publications ===
- Marxism and Materialism, Harvester and Humanities, 1977, 2nd edition, 1979.
- The Metaphysics of the Social World, Routledge and Kegan Paul, 1985.
- Explaining Explanation, Routledge, 1990. Second edition, Paradigm Publishers, 2012.
- Editor, Explanation, Readings in Philosophy Series, Oxford University Press, 1993.
- Action and Its Explanations, Oxford University Press, 2003.
- Propp, Henry W.; Ruben, David-Hillel (2015). The Propp family history : 1760-2015. Bury St. Edmunds, Suffolk: Arima Publishing. ISBN 9781845496531.
- The Metaphysics of Action, Palgrave Macmillan, 2018.
- ‘Traditions and True Successors’, Social Epistemology, January 2013, Vol. 27, No. 1, pp 32–46.
- ‘Trying in Some Way’, Australasian Journal of Philosophy, December 2013, Vol. 91, No. 4, pp 719–733.
- 'A Conditional Theory of Trying', Philosophical Studies, 173 (1), January 2016, 271-287.
- ’One-Particularism in the Theory of Action’, Philosophical Studies, Vol. 175, Issue 11, 2677-2694, Nov. 2018.
- 'Prime Cuts and the Method of Recombination', Episteme, Vol. 19 (1), March 2022, 21-30.
- 'Collocation and Constitution', Metaphysica, Sept. 2021, Vol. 22, Issue 2, 251-261.
- ‘Reply to ‘attempts’: A Non-Davidsonian Account of Trying Sentences’, Philosophical Studies, 2022, 179, issue 12, pages 3817–3830.
- 'Multifunctional Artefacts and Collocation', Metaphysics, 5(1), 2022, pp. 66–77. DOI: https://doi.org/10.5334/met.94
