= Alexander Abramsky =

Soviet composer

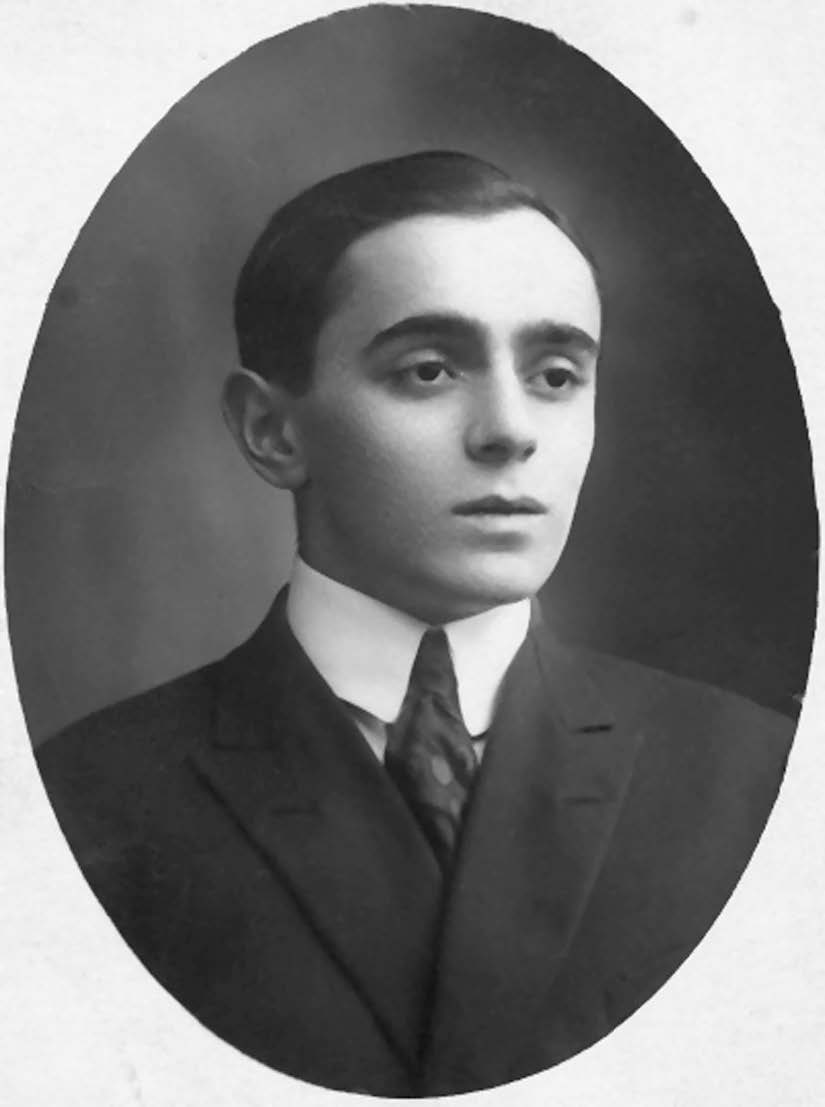
MA 2009-1 p097-104(Абрамский)

Alexander Abramsky (Russian: Алекса́ндр Савва́тьевич Абра́мский; 22 January 1898 in Lutsk – 29 August 1985 in Moscow) was a Soviet composer. He was known for his adaptation of folk music within his compositions.

Abramsky was born on January 10 (22), 1898 in the city of Lutsk. His father, Savvaty Vasilyevich (Shevel Volfovich) Abramsky (1859 -?), was a Jewish hospital doctor, and was married to Anna Fedorovna Burdo who had two sons, Mikhail and Alexander. By all accounts, Abramsky's relationship with his father was warm and congenial.

He became a teacher at the Union of Composers of the USSR in 1951, teaching compositional skills to young composers.

== Compositions ==
=== Orchestral ===
- Three symphonies
- Concerto for large symphony orchestra

=== Opera ===
- "The Vicious Circle" (based on the plot of A. Chekhov, libretto by Abramsky)

=== Musical ===
- “Lyali Khan and Anar Khan” (libretto by J. Asimov)

=== Songs ===
- "Who, Waves, Stopped You"? (Based on text A. Pushkin)

=== Cantata ===
- “Breath of the Earth” (poems by V. Khlebnikov)
- “The stacks are burning” (poems by E. Verhaeren, translated by V. Bryusov)
- “Juno’s Lover” (poems by V. Khlebnikov)

=== Oratorio ===
- “Man Walks” (text by V. Kuznetsov and V. .Semernin)
- “Round Dances” (text by V. Kuznetsov and V. Semernin)

=== Instrumental ===
- “Five Compressed Messages” for strings and piano

=== Piano ===
- "Sonata laconique" (“Brief Sketch”)
- “Pasionaria” (“Pasionary”)
- "Spanish Rhapsody"

== Writings ==
- 1936: "Opera On The Collective Farm." Mass Musical Movement (5), no. 34.
