= Eliezer Zobin =

British Orthodox rabbi and dayan

Dayan Eliezer Zobin
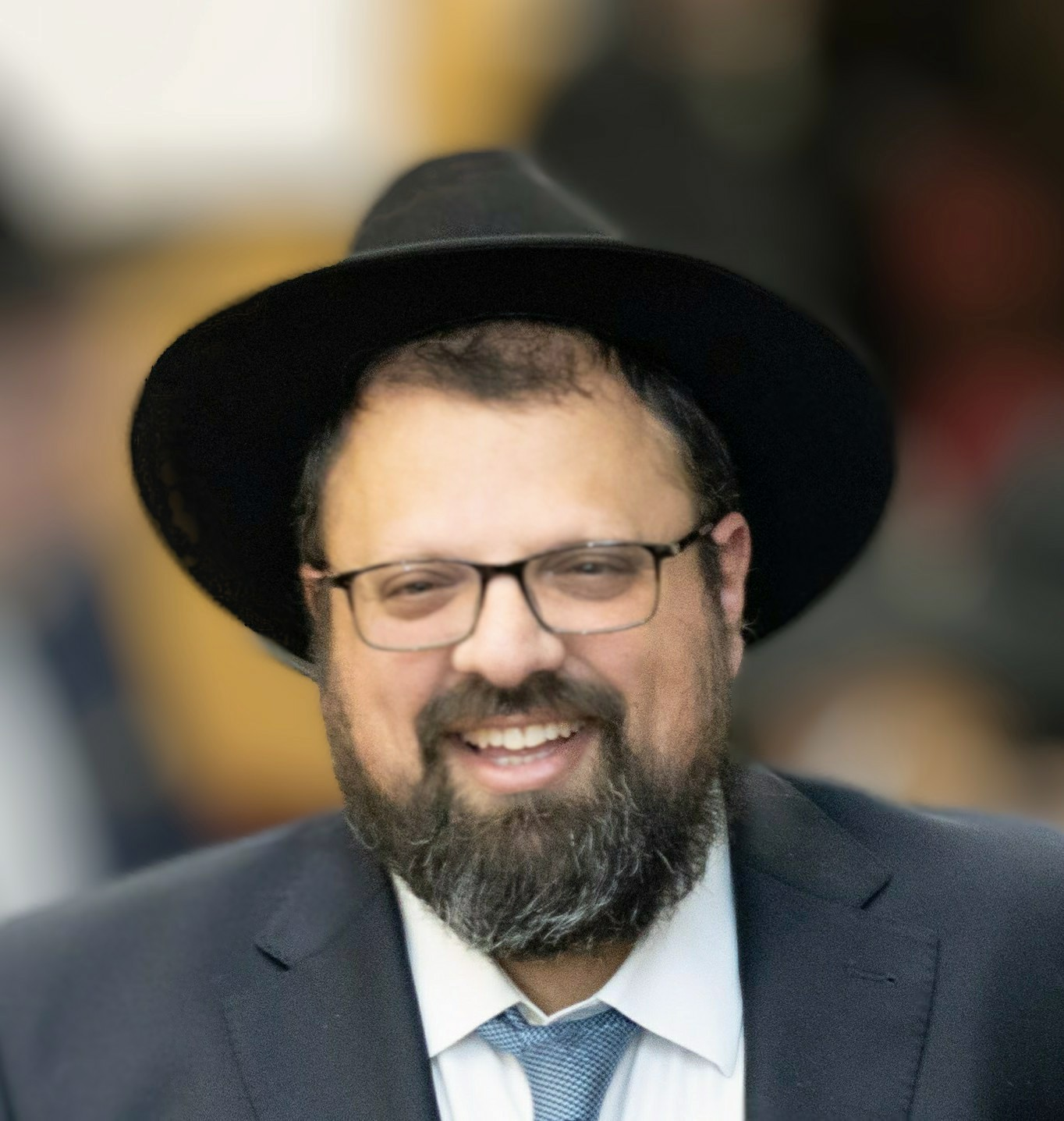
- Occupations: Senior Rabbi, Ner Yisrael Community; Dayan, London Beth Din
- Movement: Orthodox Judaism

Eliezer Zobin is a British Orthodox rabbi and dayan of the London Beth Din. He has served as senior rabbi of the Ner Yisrael community in Hendon since 2018. He has spent over two decades teaching and mentoring teenagers and adults. He is also the rabbinic advisor to numerous UK Jewish community organisations and charities, including schools, youth support services, mental health bodies, health and wellbeing organisations, a community-run volunteer ambulance service, and several prominent adult educational and rabbinic institutions.

== Biography ==
Eliezer Zobin grew up in Golders Green, London, and attended Menorah Primary School and Hasmonean High School. In 1993, as a 17-year old, he achieved the highest mark for economics in the country, and was awarded the Shell Prize for excellence in A-levels.

After high school, he continued his Torah studies at several yeshivot in Israel, including Yeshivat Be'er Yaakov, and also studied under Rabbi Yitzchok Soloveitchik.

Dayan Zobin holds an MA in Jewish Education from the University of London as well as a Teaching Qualification.

He is married, with four children and one grandchild.

== Rabbinic and pastoral roles ==
From 2014 to 2023, Zobin served as principal of Immanuel College, a Jewish secondary school in Bushey, Hertfordshire. In his role there, Zobin showed a broad and sensitive understanding of contemporary challenges affecting Jewish youth and of Modern Orthodox concerns. Zobin had the opportunity to liaise with the late Chief Rabbi Jonathan Sacks, who held public sessions with the students.

In 2014, Zobin joined the Ner Yisrael community in Hendon as associate rabbi. In 2018, Zobin was appointed senior rabbi, succeeding Rabbi Alan Kimche and remains in this role. It is one of the largest Modern Orthodox synagogues in Europe. Zobin delivers lectures on Tanach, Talmud, Jewish history, and Jewish philosophy; he organises educational and guest lectures, heritage trips to Europe and North Africa, hosts high-level panels with political, diplomatic and rabbinic figures, and provides sensitive halachic and pastoral guidance on a daily basis to individuals and families.

In February 2026, in a joint initiative with the Rabbinic Training Academy, Ner Yisrael appointed a Rabbinic intern couple, who are to be mentored and guided by Dayan and Rebbetzin Zobin. As of July 2026, the community is expanding, with some 60 new members from 2025.

In February 2023, Rabbi Zobin was appointed as one of five dayanim (rabbinic judges) of the London Beth Din. Zobin was reported to have impressed the recruitment committee with his expertise in practical halacha and leadership, as well as his engagement with Modern Orthodox communities and breadth of understanding. His appointment was welcomed by Michael Goldstein, President of the United Synagogue. Zobin is widely considered an expert in the compassionate application of halacha and with experience in addressing mental health issues with sensitivity and human understanding. As a dayan, he works closely with Chief Rabbi Ephraim Mirvis, and consults with senior colleagues in the United Kingdom. Since August 2026, Dayan Zobin has been the principal speaker on the United Synagogue's podcast, Dayan Zobin On..., in conversation with Rabbi Michael Laitner. The series explores contemporary Jewish life, dealing with theology, ethical dilemmas, the modern relevance of Jewish law, and current affairs.

Dayan Zobin is a senior rabbinic advisor to numerous UK Jewish charities and organisations. He holds advisory roles with Jewish health and welfare organisations, including Hatzola, a community-run ambulance service; Chana, the leading fertility support organisation for the UK Jewish community; Camp Simcha, a support service for families of seriously ill children; J-Teen, an organisation dedicated to supporting the wellbeing teenagers, parents, and teachers; Sinai Youth Movement; Youth Platoon, a support organisation for Jewish teenagers; and the British Association of Orthodox Jewish Mental Health Professionals. Zobin is outspoken in issues regarding ethics, education, mental health, and compassion. Previously, Zobin volunteered for Drugsline, an addiction support charity, which was in operation from 1983 to 2012, an experience which opened his eyes constructively to issues of substance abuse and mental health.

Dayan Zobin is said to offer rabbinic, educational, and pastoral advice for the UK Jewish community and is involved in educational and communal projects, including women's Jewish learning initiatives.

Dayan Zobin has served as head of the study programme at LSJS and has taught on the Montefiore College Semicha programme. Zobin has guided rabbinic couples at London's Rabbinic Training Academy. Dayan Zobin is the Principal of the modern Orthodox Independent Jewish Day School in Hendon, northwest London. Zobin teaches at the Evening Beis, teaching topics of Jewish philosophy and contemporary Orthodox life, helping University students navigate issues of faith and science, modernity, current affairs, and tradition in light of academic study, utilising the whole spectrum of classical and medieval Jewish thought. In 2015, Zobin was among the founding rabbis of the Federation of Synagogues ShailaText service.

== Leadership and views ==
Dayan Eliezer Zobin is a senior Anglo-Jewish leader, who speaks on faith, philosophy, ethics and public life. He is widely regarded as a powerful moral voice and communal leader. Dayan Zobin is also active in interfaith discussions, and in calling for broader empathy and compassion amongst faiths and peoples. Whilst being a strong voice for recognising the suffering of others, asserting that "compassion is not a limited fund, and recognising the grief of others does not somehow diminish our own," he has also been strongly critical of Kairos II and its theological repudiation of Zionism.

In 2014, Rabbi Zobin contributed to a collection of scholarly essays honouring the late Rabbi Lord Jonathan Sacks upon his retirement, writing on "the definition of education in Jewish law." In November 2022, Zobin also delivered a number of eulogies and lectures on the thought of Chief Rabbi Jonathan Sacks.

In November 2020, Dayan Zobin hosted a talk with Rahima Mahmut, UK director for the World Uyghur Congress, one of the first events by the Jewish community, on the Persecution of Uyghurs in China for the UK Jewish community.

During the COVID-19 pandemic, Zobin was reported to have urged members of Jewish communities in north-west London to comply with government public-health guidance, including social-distancing regulations.

Dayan Zobin has regularly featured on YouTube interviews for J-TV, on topics such as modern Jewish identity, Judaism and AI, religious responses to COVID-19, Morality, balancing Jewish and secular values, and more. In July 2025, he was a guest on J-Teen's podcast, a UK Jewish community mental health charity, discussing "Emotional Crisis & Halacha". Since August 2026, he features in a special podcast series produced and run by the United Synagogue, Dayan Zobin On..., in conversation with Rabbi Michael Laitner.

In a May 2025 news interview, Dayan Zobin condemned antisemitism on university campuses. However, at a community panel event in June 2026, whilst recognising troubling trends of antisemitism in the UK, Dayan Zobin expressed caution around simplistic conclusions about British society, warning against embracing populist allies uncritically, stating, "The terrorists want moderates on both sides to despair. If we allow that to happen, we hand victory to the extremists."

Dayan Zobin contributed to the 2022 essay collection Strauss, Spinoza & Sinai: Orthodox Judaism and Modern Questions of Faith. Reviewers have mentioned Zobin's bold use of modern subjectivism in advocating for Orthodox Judaism, contributing to current discourse around faith, philosophy, and modernity.

Dayan Zobin has spoken publicly about the need to counter materialistic and pessimistic worldviews among young people through renewed spirituality and promoting shared values across wider society, as well as the value of religion.

In November 2026, The Spectator published an opinion piece from Dayan Zobin entitled 'The great paradox of Western civilisation.' In it, he contrasted the transactional nature of social contracts with covenants founded on moral obligations, arguing that the latter are essential for sustaining civilisation.

Dayan Zobin is also credited with fostering honest and candid discussions around key challenges facing Jewish communities today, particularly from a moral and ethical perspective.
