= Barry Bearak =

American journalist and educator

Barry Leon Bearak
- Born: August 31, 1949 (age 76); Chicago, Illinois
- Occupations: Journalist, professor of journalism
- Notable credit: The New York Times
- Spouse: Celia W. Dugger

Barry Leon Bearak (born August 31, 1949, in Chicago) is an American journalist and educator who has worked as a reporter and correspondent for The Miami Herald, the Los Angeles Times, and The New York Times. He taught journalism as a visiting professor at the Columbia University Graduate School of Journalism.

Bearak won the 2002 Pulitzer Prize for International Reporting for his penetrating accounts of poverty and war in Afghanistan. The Pulitzer Prize committee cited him "for his deeply affecting and illuminating coverage of daily life in war-torn Afghanistan.". Bearak was also a Pulitzer finalist in feature writing in 1987.

On April 3, 2008, Bearak was taken into custody by Zimbabwean police as part of a crackdown on journalists covering the 2008 Zimbabwean election. He was charged with "falsely presenting himself as a journalist" in violation of the strict accreditation requirements that were imposed by the government of Robert Mugabe. Despite worldwide condemnation and court petitions that were filed immediately to release him from detention, Bearak remained in a detention cell in Harare for 5 days. On April 7, 2008, Bearak was released on bail by a Zimbabwean court. On April 16, 2008, a Zimbabwean court dismissed the charges against Bearak, saying that the state had failed to provide evidence of any crime, and ordered that Bearak and Stephen Bevan, a British freelance reporter who had also been accused of violating the country's stiff journalism laws, be released. Immediately following the court ruling, Mr. Bearak left Zimbabwe and returned to his home in Johannesburg."

== Biography ==
Bearak began his career as a general assignment reporter for the Miami Herald, where he worked from 1976 to 1982. He then became a national correspondent for the Los Angeles Times, working for the L.A. Times for over 14 years. In 1997, he joined The New York Times, where he served as a foreign correspondent, magazine writer and sports writer. Bearak was co-bureau chief of the Times's South Asia bureau in New Delhi from 1998 to 2002. In early 2008, Bearak and his wife Celia Dugger became co-bureau chiefs of The New York Times' Johannesburg bureau.

In addition to the Pulitzer Prize, Bearak has twice received the George Polk Award for foreign reporting, in 2001 "for his dynamic eyewitness reporting on the Taliban and his subsequent coverage of the war on terror," and in 2008, along with Celia Dugger, for "dozens of stories that painted a vivid picture of the repression, disease and hunger that still torment the nation of Zimbabwe." Bearak has additionally won the Mike Berger Award, presented by Columbia University; the James Aronson Award for Social Justice, presented by Hunter College; and the Harry Chapin Media Award, presented at the New School for Social Research. He was a 1980–1981 Michigan Journalism Fellow at the University of Michigan. Bearak's story "Caballo Blanco's Last Run" is included in the collection The Best American Sportswriting 2013.

Bearak has two honorary doctorate degrees, one from the University of Illinois (2003) where he also received his master's degree in journalism and the other from Knox College (2008) where he also received his bachelor's degree. He was the commencement speaker at the University of Illinois on May 18, 2003. https://commencement.illinois.edu/wp-content/uploads/2019/10/BarryBearakCommencementAddress.pdf

== Detention in Zimbabwe ==
In March 2008, Bearak was assigned by the Times to cover the 2008 Zimbabwean election. On April 3, 2008, Bearak reported directly from Harare, Zimbabwe, and published a front-page story about the elections, highlighting the suspicions raised by international monitors and opposition party leaders that Zimbabwe President Robert Mugabe's party has rigged the election results, amid their fears of losing the elections after 28 years in power. In the article, Bearak described Mugabe as a "statesman who became a ruthless autocrat to be forever remembered for murderous campaigns against his enemies." On the very same day, Bearak was arrested by riot police in Harare, while staying at a hotel frequented by many Western journalists. His safety and whereabouts remained unknown during the day. New York Times Executive Editor Bill Keller pledged the Times will make every effort to ascertain Bearak's status and secure his immediate release. Zimbabwean police later released a statement claiming that Bearak was arrested for "practicing without accreditation." Zimbabwe prohibits foreign journalists from reporting there without government approval, which is rarely granted.

On April 4, 2008, Bearak was charged by the Zimbabwean police with passing himself off as an accredited journalist. However, when the Zimbabwean police realized that the press law had been changed, he was recharged with "falsely presenting himself as a journalist." On April 5, 2008 The New York Times reported that local lawyers hired to fight the charges had gone to the attorney general's office and argued that there was no evidence to support the charge. Officials there agreed, and said Mr. Bearak should be released. However, back at the police station, the police refused to release Bearak. Beatrice Mtetwa, Bearak's lawyer, said: "The police advised that they had received orders from above not to release him. Obviously they got political instructions from elsewhere to hold them."

Bill Keller, the executive editor of the Times, condemned the arrest and the filing of charges and said Bearak was being held on charges "that even the government's own lawyers recognize as baseless." As to the charge that Bearak had misrepresented himself as an accredited journalist, Keller called it a "ludicrous assertion."

In response to the detention of Bearak and other journalists who were arrested with him, the Committee to Protect Journalists issued a statement calling on Zimbabwean authorities to "stop intimidating all journalists" and saying, "It is imperative that all journalists, foreign and domestic, be allowed to freely cover the important political situation unfolding in Zimbabwe." In addition, the International Press Institute, the global network of editors, media executives and leading journalists in over 120 countries, called on Zimbabwean authorities to immediately release Barry Bearak. IPI Director David Dadge issued the following statement:

The regulatory structures imposed by the Zimbabwean government have long served primarily to silence journalists, both local and foreign, but are particularly problematic during this vital election period. We call on Zimbabwean authorities to promptly release Mr. Bearak, and to stop relying on arbitrary accreditation requirements to prevent independent commentary on the elections.

On April 7, 2008, after spending four nights in a detention cell in Harare, Bearak was released on bail of Z$300 million (US$10,000 at official exchange rates; less than US$10 at black market rates) by a Zimbabwean court. He was told to reappear in court on Thursday and ordered to stay in Harare.

On April 16, 2008, a Zimbabwean court dismissed the charges against Bearak. A magistrate in a court in Harare ruled that the state had failed to provide evidence of any crime, and ordered that Bearak and British journalist Stephen Bevan be released. Upon the dismissal of the charges against Bearak, The New York Times executive editor Bill Keller thanked "many people — in particular some brave and honorable Zimbabweans — who stood by Barry" and also mentioned "officials and former officials, civic leaders and journalists' organizations in many countries" who offered support publicly and behind the scenes.
