= Chimen Abramsky =

British educator

- שמעון אברמסקי
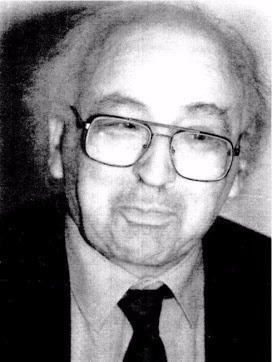
- Born: 12 September 1916; Minsk, Russian Empire
- Died: 14 March 2010 (aged 93)
- Spouse: Miriam Nirenstein
- Children: 2, including Jenny Abramsky
- Parent: Yehezkel Abramsky (father)

Academic background
- Education: Hebrew University of Jerusalem; University of Oxford

Chimen Abramsky (Hebrew: שמעון אברמסקי; 12 September 1916 – 14 March 2010) was emeritus professor of Jewish studies at University College London. His first name is pronounced Shimon.

== Biography ==
Abramsky was born in Minsk to a Lithuanian Jewish family on 12 September 1916, the son of Rabbi Yehezkel Abramsky. He gained a BA degree from the Hebrew University of Jerusalem and an MA from the University of Oxford. He was Reader in Jewish History, then Goldsmid Professor of Hebrew and Jewish Studies at University College London. He was a Senior Fellow at St Antony's College, Oxford. A noted scholar of Jewish History, Abramsky was also well known as an expert on antiquarian Hebrew books and manuscripts, and was professionally consulted for many years by the auction house Sotheby's, which traditionally ran one Hebraica and Judaica auction every year.

His father arrived in London in December 1931 after being expelled from the Soviet Union. The next year Chimen arrived with his mother and younger brother. Three years later, in 1935, he travelled to Palestine to study history at the Hebrew University in Jerusalem and became involved in socialist campus politics. On one occasion he was beaten up by future Israeli prime minister Yitzhak Shamir – then a leading figure in the rightwing Irgun. Abramsky was described as an atheist.

Visiting London in the summer of 1939 to see his parents, Abramsky was unable to return to Palestine because of World War 2. Instead he started working at Shapiro, Vallentine & Co., London's oldest Jewish bookshop and publisher of Jewish scholarly books, where he met Miriam Nirenstein, the proprietor's daughter. They married in 1940 and had two children, Jack and Jenny. Jack, a mathematician, is the father of journalist Sasha Abramsky. Jenny became of the BBC's longest-serving senior executives. Abramsky was the uncle by marriage of the socialist historian Raphael Samuel. The house Chimen and Miriam shared in Highgate, Northern London, was considered an important destination for thinkers and scholars.

Abramsky's library in that home was a particular attraction, containing first editions of books by Marx, Engels, and William Morris; documents from Trotsky and Rosa Luxemburg; notes from Lenin and Marx; even Luxemburg's doctoral dissertation. Though the family sold the library after Abramsky's death, a short documentary on it was made under the direction of Christopher Hird, titled "My Life, My Library and the Left," in which Abramsky is interviewed by Tariq Ali. Shown at Abramsky's wake, the film was later broadcast on Telesur.

In 1966, he was invited to take up a newly created lectureship in modern Jewish history at University College London.

In a well-known incident, Abramsky once hosted the Japanese prince and Hebrew scholar Prince Takahito Mikasa at the University College London's Institute of Jewish Studies in 1975.

Abramsky died on 14 March 2010.

== See also ==
- List of British Jews
