= Avraham Yaakov Pam =

Head of Yeshiva Torah Vodaas

Rabbi Avraham Yaakov Hakohen Pam
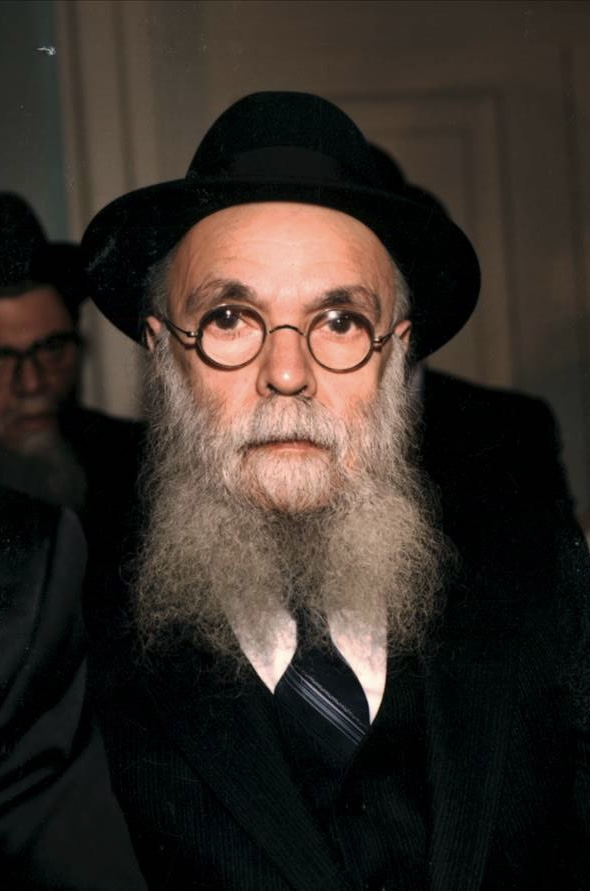
- Born: 1913; Vidzy, Lithuania
- Died: August 16, 2001 (aged 87–88)
- Occupation: Rosh Yeshiva of Yeshiva Torah Vodaas
- Relatives: Avrohom Yaakov Pam, Raphael Dovid Pam, Aryeh Leib Pam, (great-grandchildren)

Avraham Yaakov Pam (1913 – August 16, 2001) was the rosh yeshiva of Yeshiva Torah Vodaas in Brooklyn, New York.

== Biography ==
Rabbi Pam began his career at Yeshiva Torah Vodaas in 1938, when was appointed maggid shiur (Talmudic lecturer) there. At that time secularism was on the rise in the United States, even amongst Orthodox Jews. In 1943, he married Sarah Balmuth. His teachers included Moshe Rosen (Nezer HaKodesh) and Dovid Leibowitz.

During Pam's sixty-plus years at Torah Vodaas, he held many positions. He even taught mathematics in the Yeshiva, utilizing his degree from the City College. For many years in the 1970s, 1980s, and 1990s he delivered the semicha class to students studying toward rabbinic ordination.

Pam's dress was unassuming: he preferred modern short jackets and Fedora hats to the more traditional long frock coats and Homburg hats, generally worn by heads of Yeshivas. While Pam was respected as a great talmudic scholar within Yeshiva circles, he was also widely admired for his humility and soft-spoken style.

Pam was a vocal supporter of yeshiva education for non-religious Russian immigrants to Israel through the work of his organization called Shuvu. At the keynote session of the annual 1990 Agudath Israel convention, Pam spoke impassionedly about the influx of new Jewish emigrants from the Soviet Union and his concern that their children were growing up oblivious to their religious heritage. He argued that a network of schools should be set up in Israel for those emigrants and organized a convention meeting with wealthy and influential patrons to facilitate his vision. He appointed Avraham Biderman as the chair of Shuvu, the organization founded at that meeting. After Pam's death, the organization was renamed Shuvu: Chazon Avraham, in his memory.
