= Yehezkel Abramsky =

Russian rabbi and scholar (1886–1976)

- יחזקאל אברמסקי
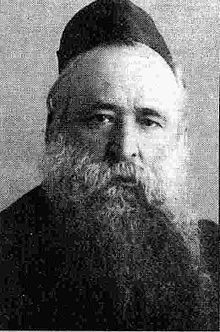
- Title: Rabbi

Personal life
- Born: 7 February 1886 Dashkovichy, Russian Empire (now Belarus)
- Died: 19 September 1976 (aged 90) Jerusalem
- Buried: Har HaMenuchot, Jerusalem
- Spouse: Hendl Reizel
- Children: 4 (including Chimen)

Religious life
- Religion: Judaism
- Denomination: Orthodox Judaism

Jewish leader
- Yeshiva: Slabodka yeshiva
- Organisation: London Beth Din
- Yahrtzeit: 24 Elul 5736

Yehezkel Abramsky (Hebrew: יחזקאל אברמסקי; 7 February 1886 – 19 September 1976) was a Russian Orthodox Jewish rabbi and scholar who later headed the London Beth Din rabbinical court for 17 years, before retiring to Jerusalem in 1951.

== Rabbinate and scholarship ==
Yehezkel ("Chatzkel") Abramsky was born in the village of Dashkovichy, in the Russian Empire (now in Svislach district, Belarus) was the third child and eldest son of Mordechai Zalman Abramsky, a local timber merchant, and his wife, Freydel Goldin of Grodno. His parents were deeply religious but the village lacked enough Jews to support a prayer service so Yehezkel studied at home before moving on to study in the yeshivas of Telz, Mir, Slabodka and particularly Brisk under Rabbi Chaim Soloveitchik. At the age of 17 he became a rabbi, serving, in turn, the Belarusian communities of Smalyany, Smalyavichy, and Slutsk.

Following the October Revolution, he was at the forefront of opposition to the communist government's attempts to repress the Jewish religion and culture. During this time he would serve as both the Rabbi of Slutsk and Smolensk. As a result, the Soviet government refused Abramsky permission to leave and take up the rabbinate of Petah Tikva in Palestine in both 1926 and 1928. In 1926 while serving as the rabbi of Slutsk, he joined (together with Rabbi Shlomo Yosef Zevin) the Vaad Harabbonim of the U.S.S.R.

In 1928 he started a Hebrew magazine, Yagdil Torah (lit. 'Make [the] Torah Great'), but the Soviet authorities closed it after the first two issues had appeared. In 1929 he was arrested and sentenced to five years' hard labor in Siberia, where he is said to have composed Talmudic commentaries on translucent cigarette papers. However, in 1931 he was released due to intervention by the German government under chancellor Heinrich Brüning, who exchanged him for six communists they held.

== London Beth Din ==
He arrived in London towards the end of 1931, where he was appointed rabbi of the Machzike Hadath community in London's East End. In 1934 Chief Rabbi Joseph H. Hertz persuaded him to become Rosh Beth Din of the London Beth Din, a post he held until he retired to Jerusalem in 1951. The appointment of an East European chareidi rabbi to the London Beth Din was a departure for the United Synagogue, and started a tradition which continues to the present day. The prestige of the London Beth Din as a world-ranking halachic authority was greatly enhanced through the appointment of Rabbi Abramsky as Rosh Beth Din. Although other renowned talmidei chachamim served both during and since his time—such as Dayan Aryeh Leib Grosnass (Lev Aryeh) and Dayan Avrohom Rapoport (Be'er Avrohom), it was Dayan Abramsky above all who established the policies and customs that are followed by the London Beth Din to this day.

Following his retirement from the London Beth Din, he settled in Jerusalem. While living there he also served as a rosh yeshiva of Slabodka yeshiva in Bnei Brak.

Rabbi Abramsky died in Jerusalem on 19 September 1976 (24 Elul 5736). His funeral was attended by over 40,000 people, making it one of the largest ever seen in the city. He was interred on Har HaMenuchot.

== Family ==
In 1909 he married Hendl Reizel, daughter of rabbi Yisroel Yehonasan Yerushamski (or Yershamiski), the rabbi of Orla and of Thumen, and son-in-law, through his second marriage, of "the Ridbaz," Rabbi Yaakov Dovid Wilovsky.

=== Descendants ===
He had four sons including professor Chimen Abramsky, and was the grandfather of professor Samson Abramsky and Jenny Abramsky.

== Awards ==
- In 1956 Rabbi Abramsky was awarded the first Israel Prize for Rabbinical literature.

== Works ==
- Hazon Yehezkel ("The Vision of Yehezkel"), a 24-volume commentary on the Tosefta (based on the Vienna Codex). The commentary, written between 1925 and 1975, is highly acclaimed by both rabbis and academic scholars.

== See also ==
- List of Israel Prize recipients
- Abramsky
