= Hasmonean High School =

Location
- Holders Hill Road; Hendon, London; England; 51.5963°N 0.2143°W

Information
- Type: Academy
- Motto: אל תקרי בניך אלא בוניך ("Don't call them your children, rather your builders")
- Religious affiliation: Jewish
- Established: 1944
- Department for Education URN: 137539 Tables
- Ofsted: Reports
- Chairman: Gary Swabel
- Head teacher: Andrew McClusky (Exec.), James Fisher(Boys), Kate Brice (Girls)
- Gender: Boys and girls on separate sites
- Age: 11 to 18
- Enrolment: 1016
- Website: www.hasmoneanmat.org.uk

Hasmonean High School is a secondary school and sixth form with academy status for pupils from Orthodox Jewish families, situated in the London Borough of Barnet, England.

== History ==
The school was founded the rabbi Solomon Schonfeld in 1944 as Hasmonean Grammar School. Schonfeld (1912–1984) rescued thousands of Jews from the Holocaust and pioneered Jewish day school education in England.

The boys’ school became a voluntary aided Local Authority School in 1957. In September 1975, the girls moved to the present purpose-built Page Street site in Mill Hill. In 1984, voluntary aided status was extended to the girls' school, and the two sections joined as one to become a five-form-entry school. In April 1994, the school became grant maintained, but returned to Voluntary Aided Status in September 1999, following the abolition of grant-maintained schools. In March 2008 Hasmonean was singled out as one of the faith schools in the news for its procedure of demanding contributions from parents as a condition of entry. The school converted to academy status in October 2011.

The school has established a Beis Hamedrash programme for fifth and sixth form boys (Years 11–13) and a Midrasha programme for sixth form girls.

In 2023, Year 7 moved over to a site in Belsize Park, owing to a large number of students applying to join. The following year, Year 7 and 8 classes were both situated there.

=== Headteachers ===
- Walter Stanton M.A.(Oxon.) (1944–1980) founding head
- Rabbi Meir Roberg (1980–1993)
- Dr Dena Coleman (1993–1998)
- Rabbi David Radomsky (2000–2006)
- Martin Clark (2006–2007)
- David Fuller (2007–2009)
- Rabbi D. Meyer (2009–2015)
- Deborah Lebrett (2015–2023)
- Miriam Langdon (2023–2025)
- James Fisher (2026–Present)

== Location ==
Originally, the school was situated in The Drive in Golders Green until 1947. In that year, the boys' school moved to Holders Hill Road, where it has remained until the present day. Until 1975, the girls' school was accommodated in two large houses in Parson Street, Hendon, when it was relocated to Page Street. In 2023, a middle school opened in Belsize Park, Southampton Rd, to hold the Year 7 students, and the following year, both Year 7 and Year 8 were there.

== Governing body ==
Soon after its opening, the school became part of the Jewish Secondary Schools Movement (JSSM). Under the terms of the JSSM scheme, the trustees of the school must be appointed by the rabbis of certain synagogues, namely, the Adath Yisroel, the Golders Green Beth Hamedrash Congregation and the Hendon Adath Yisroel. The trustees in turn appoint the Foundation Governors, who together with the Headteacher, two LEA appointed Governors, three parent-elected Governors, two teacher-elected Governors and the Staff Governor form the Governing Body. The current chairmen of governors are Gary Swabel (MAT), Yossi Halberstadt (Boys) and Steven Blumgart (Girls).

== Academic results ==
Hasmonean has been commended by SSAT for being in the top 10% of non-selective schools according to the number of students gaining 5 or more A* – A grades. Following an inspection in 2012, Hasmonean is rated 'Outstanding' in all categories by Ofsted.

The school has also been commended for the progress students make between Key Stage 2 and 4, with some subjects being in the top 1% and all being in the top 4% of all schools.

== Future ==
Hasmonean MAT has three campuses, one for boys, a separate one for girls, and a last for year seven and eight male students, which are over a mile apart. The three campuses share leadership teams and teaching staff, but, in accordance with Hasmonean's ethos, the educational accommodation, external spaces and play areas are separate.

In 2016, Hasmonean proposed moving both the boys’ and girls’ campuses onto one secured site. Each campus would sit on its own site and have separate entrances, facilities and play areas. The land identified at this stage is the land next to, and including, the current girls’ campus on Page Street. Each campus would also have its own security team. The redevelopment plans were subsequently rejected by the Mayor of London.

== Notable former pupils ==
- Alan Howard, Hedge Fund Manager
- Dina Rabinovitch, journalist
- Polina Bayvel, DBE, FRS, Engineer and Academic
- Eliezer Zobin, Rabbi of Ner Yisrael community, Hendon, and Dayan on the London Beth Din

=== Hasmonean Grammar School ===
- His Honour Judge Nigel Peters QC
- Samson Abramsky, professor of Computer Science
- David Landau (journalist)
- Norman Lebrecht, writer and broadcaster
- Edward Mirzoeff, BBC producer
- Prof David Newman, Dean of the Faculty of Humanities and Social Sciences at Ben-Gurion University in Israel
