= London Beth Din =

British jewish religious court

The London Beth Din (LBD; Hebrew: בית הדין הרבני בלונדון, romanized: Bit Hadin Harbani b'London, Yiddish: לאנדאנער בית דין, romanized: Londoner Bit Din) is the Ashkenazi Beth Din of the United Synagogue, the largest Ashkenazi synagogal body in London, England. In its capacity as Court of the Chief Rabbi, it is historically the supreme halakhic Authority for Ashkenazim in several Commonwealth countries and additionally is consulted by Batei Din throughout Europe. The current head (Rosh Beth Din) of the London Beth Din is Dayan Menachem Gelley, who joined the court in 1993 and was appointed to his current position in 2014, succeeding Chanoch Ehrentreu.

== History ==
The Beth Din has functioned as the central religious authority in Britain since the early eighteenth century. It has been headed by a number of illustrious Rabbis including Tevele Schiff and Yehezkel Abramsky. It is responsible for the largest kashruth organization in Europe, known as KLBD, under Rabbi Jeremy Conway.

The Beth Din's work includes genealogical research, divorce and the arbitration of civil disputes.

In February 2023, Eliezer Zobin was appointed a dayan (rabbinic judge) of the London Beth Din. In that capacity and well-known for his compassion, he serves as a rabbinic advisor on several of the UK Jewish community's health services and charities.

== Conversions ==
The LBD program is supposed to take 2-3 years although at times it does take longer. The Beth Din processes about 35 converts per annum from around the UK, with other Batei Din (such as Manchester sending their converts to LBD for final approval). The process involves private tutoring from an approved list of teachers, and a six-month period where the candidate is expected to board with an approved family. The candidate is expected to pay for this. They are also expected to live within walking distance of an Orthodox Jewish community.

Conversions have been terminated mid-process, even for conversions affecting even those living outside of England. Rabbis from outside London's Orthodox community have attempted to intervene; LBD calls it a private matter. However, the Beth Din insist that their approach is necessary in keeping with the Halachic requirement for a prospective convert to commit to a full observance of the commandments.

The highly centralised Orthodox community in London means that not going through them for a conversion could harm a family, such as not being permitted to attend a Jewish school. There is an alternative pathway to conversion in London through the Spanish and Portuguese community.

Preceded by Rabbi Chanoch Ehrentreu	Rosh Beth Din London Beth Din; 1984-2014	Succeeded by Rabbi Menachem Gelley
Preceded by Rabbi Menachem Gelley	Rosh Beth Din London Beth Din	Succeeded by incumbent
