= Edward Kessler =

Thinker in interfaith relations (born 1963)

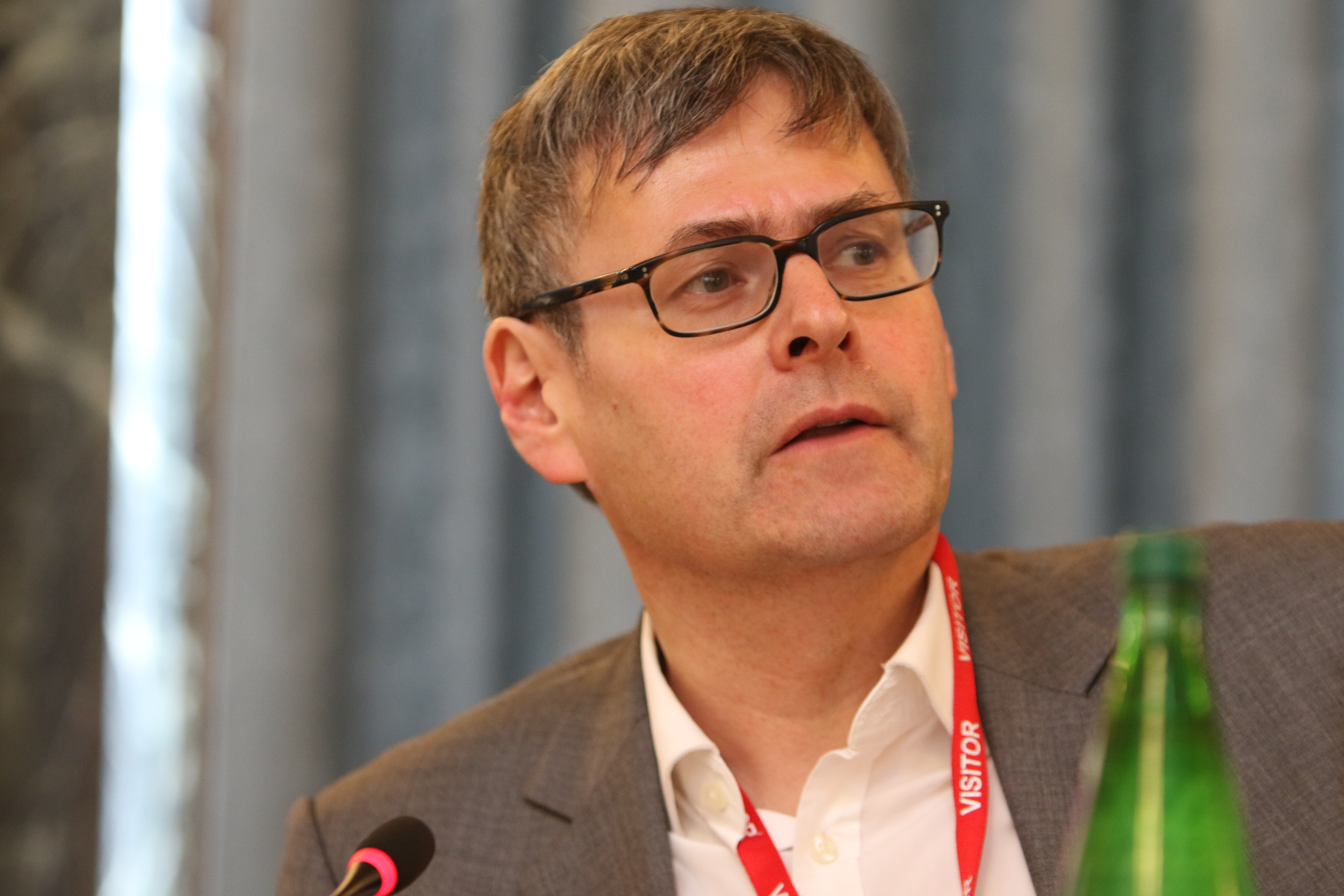
- Born: 3 May 1963 (age 63); London, England
- Occupation: Theologian
- Website: www.woolf.cam.ac.uk/people/dr-edward-kessler-mbe

Edward Kessler MBE (born 3 May 1963) is the Founder President of The Woolf Institute, a leading thinker in interfaith relations, primarily Jewish-Christian-Muslim Relations, a Fellow of St Edmund's College, Cambridge as well as Chair of both The Movement for Progressive Judaism and the Commission on Interfaith Relations.

In 2023 he was appointed Chair of the Advisory Board overseeing the unification of Reform and Liberal Judaism, which became known as The Movement for Progressive Judaism. In 2025, he was appointed Chair of the Launch Board. One of his priorities is to help shape the intellectual and theological voice of that new Movement. He helped establish the Progressive Judaism Press and co-edited (with Rabbis Charley Baginsky and Josh Levy) its first publication, Progressive Judaism, Zionism and the State of Israel.

== Biography ==
Born in 1963, Kessler was educated at City of London School and graduated with a First-Class Honours Degree in Hebrew and Religious Studies from the University of Leeds in 1985, an MTS degree from Harvard Divinity School in 1987, and an MBA degree from the University of Stirling in 1989. He went on to work in a family business, Kesslers International Group, for 7 years before returning to his academic studies, completing a PhD degree at the University of Cambridge in 1999.

Kessler, with Martin Forward, founded the Centre for the Study of Jewish-Christian Relations (CJCR) in 1998 and was elected Fellow of St Edmund's College in 2002. In 2006 The Centre for the Study of Muslim-Jewish Relations (CMJR) and the Centre for Policy Public Education were established and the name of the organisation was changed to The Woolf Institute in 2010, and its focus was extended to the study of relationship between religion and society, with a focus on relations between Jews, Christians and Muslims. It constructed its own building in 2017, located at Westminster College where the Institute is presently located.

Kessler launched an independent UK Commission in November 2022 on the Integration of Refugees. Lord Carlile was appointed Chair and Bishop Guli Francis-Dehqani Vice Chair for the first year and he took over in 2023. The Commission took evidence at hearings around the UK and published its report, From Arrival to Integration in March 2024.

In 2006, he was awarded the Sternberg Interfaith Award from philanthropist Sir Sigmund Sternberg "in recognition of outstanding services in furthering relations between faiths". In June 2007 The Times Higher Education newspaper described him as "probably the most prolific interfaith figure in British academia". In 2011 he was awarded an MBE awarded for services to interfaith relations Kessler has written or edited 13 books, including An Introduction to Jewish-Christian Relations (Cambridge, 2010), Jews, Christians and Muslims (SCM, 2013) and Jesus (The History Press, 2016). His Documentary History of Jewish-Christian Relations was published by Cambridge in 2024. In 2024, he was awarded the Seelisberg Prize for his contribution to fostering Jewish-Christian relations.

Kessler was Convenor and Vice-Chair for the Commission on Religion and Belief in British Public Life (2013–15), a two-year initiative that examined the role of religion and belief in Britain. Its report, Living with Difference] made 37 recommendations and generated public controversy, particularly over faith schools. He was also Principal Investigator of the Woolf Diversity Study, a study of diversity in England and Wales (2017–19), which published a policy report entitled, How We Get Along.

Much of his academic work has been examining scripture and exploring the significance for Jewish-Christian relations of sharing a sacred text. He has identified a common exegetical tradition, especially in the formative centuries. More recently his writings have focussed on the encounter with Islam and contemporary relations between the three Abrahamic faiths and implications for fostering a vibrant and open society. Kessler proposes approaches for managing difference, which he argues is vital in forming a positive identity as well as sustaining communities. In his discussion on covenantal theology, he argues for the creation of ‘theological space’ in which people of faith can affirm one another without losing their particularities of faith.

Kessler also explores the tensions, positive as well as negative, between religion and civil society. At a lecture at the Brookings Institution in 2014, he argued that diplomats and policymakers need to be better trained in religion and belief, describing the contemporary religious landscape as a post-interfaith world. In 2019, at The Council for Religious and Life Stance Communities in Oslo, he argued that because religious monopolies are in decline, Christianity can no longer be portrayed as the dominant ‘host’ religion in Europe and a previously intrinsic relationship is being weakened - belonging to a minority is the norm. In his 2024 address upon receiving the Seelisberg Prize at the University of Salzburg he called for a redoubling of efforts to pursue genuine dialogue at a time of increasing polarisation.

As well as teaching Cambridge University students, Kessler teaches at the Cambridge Theological Federation. In 2022, as visiting professor at the Irish School of Ecumenics, Trinity College, Dublin, he delivered a lecture on ways to sustain and safeguard, Jerusalem’s Holy Places; in 2023, he delivered the Krister Stendahl Memorial Lecture in Stockholm and discussed the importance of tackling the difficult issues in interfaith dialogue.

== Books and edited volumes ==
1989 – An English Jew: The Life and Writings of Claude Montefiore, London: Vallentine Mitchell, (2nd Edition, 2002 ISBN 9780853034391)

2002 – Jews and Christians in Conversation: Crossing cultures and generations, eds., E. Kessler, JT Pawlikowski & J Banki, Cambridge: Orchard Academic

2004 – A Reader of Liberal Judaism: Israel Abrahams, Claude Montefiore, Israel Mattuck and Lily Montagu, London: Vallentine Mitchell ISBN 9780853035923

2004 – Aspects of Liberal Judaism: Essays in Honour of John D Rayner on the occasion of his 80th Birthday, eds., E. Kessler and D.J.Goldberg, London: Vallentine Mitchell ISBN 9780853036012

2004 – Bound by the Bible: Jews, Christians and the Sacrifice of Isaac, Cambridge: Cambridge University Press ISBN 9780521543132

2004 – Themes in Jewish-Christian Relations, eds., E. Kessler & M.J. Wright, Cambridge: Orchard Academic ISBN 9781903283134

2005 – A Dictionary of Jewish-Christian Relations, eds., E, Kessler & N. Wenborn, Cambridge: Cambridge University Press

2006 – Challenges in Jewish-Christian Relations, eds., J. Aitken & E. Kessler, New York: Paulist Press ISBN 9780809143924

2006 – What do Jews Believe? London and New York: Granta Publications ISBN 9780802716392

2010 – Introduction to Jewish-Christian Relations, Cambridge: Cambridge University Press ISBN 9780521705622

2013 – Jews, Christians and Muslims in Encounter, London: SCM ISBN 9780334052975

2016 – Jesus (Pocket Giants) Stroud: The History Press ISBN 9780750961240

2026 - Progressive Judaism, Zionism and the State of Israel, eds. E. Kessler, C. Baginsky & J. Levy ISBN 9798253536209

== Other media and public presence ==
Kessler regularly appears in the media commenting on religion and belief issues of the day, such as the impact of October 7th 2023 attack on Israel and the Gaza War on the Leading Podcast, is a regular contributor to the Woolf Institute blog and hosted the weekly podcast Naked Reflections (2020-23). He also presented the series Covid-19 Chronicles (2020), which consisted of more than 50 interviews with faith leaders on the impact of the coronavirus on religion and belief. He wrote and presented two A-Z podcasts (2018–20), An A-Z of Believing: From Atheism to Zealotry and An A-Z of the Holy Land: From Arab to Zion.

He has expressed opposition about any imminent beatification/canonisation of Pope Pius XII.
