= Curtis Cassell =

German-born British rabbi

Rabbi Curtis E Cassell
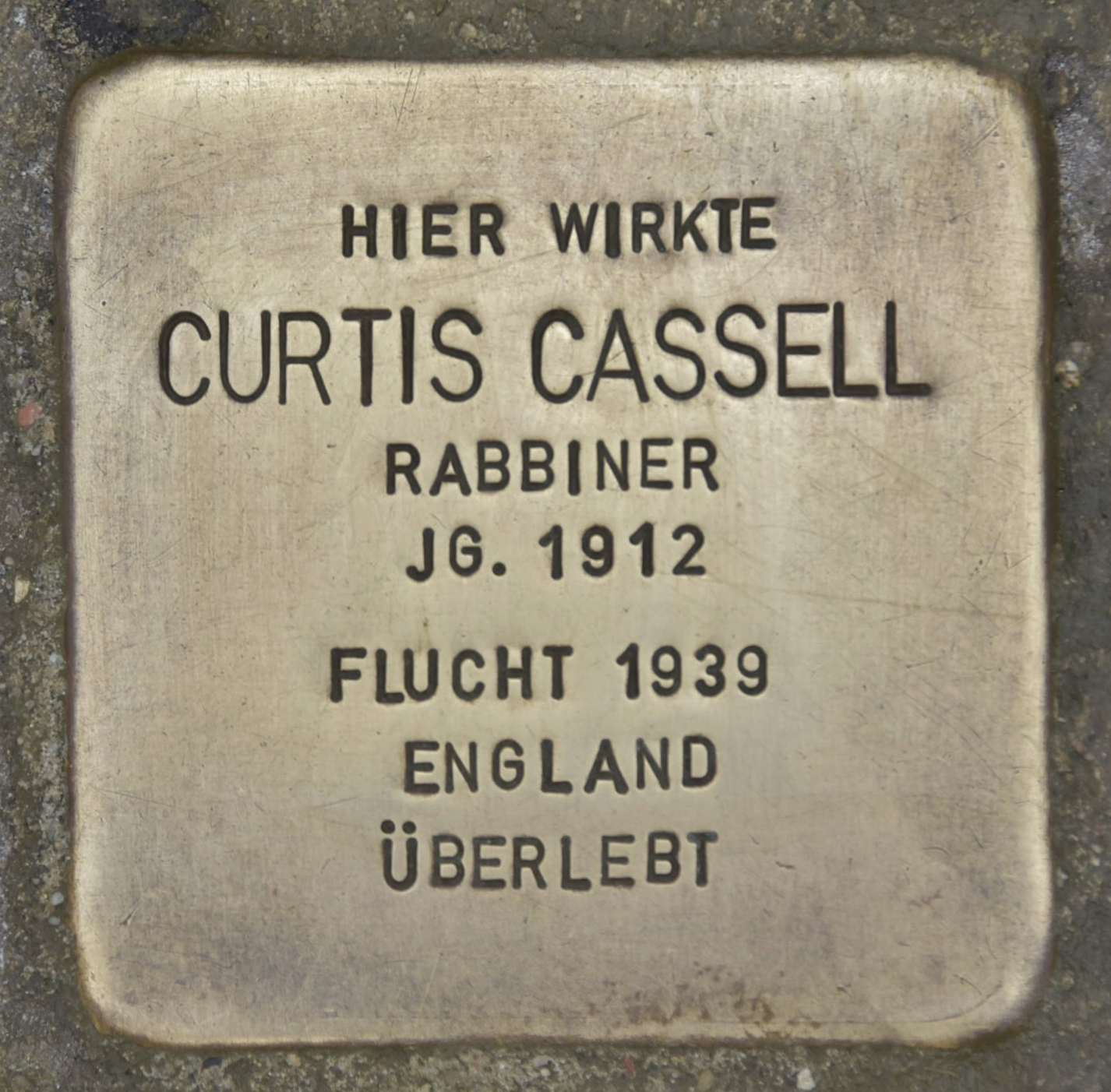

Personal life
- Born: Kurt Kassell; 8 November 1912 Opeln, Germany (now Opole, Poland)
- Died: 8 October 1998 (aged 85)
- Buried: Golders Green Jewish Cemetery

Religious life
- Religion: Judaism
- Denomination: Reform / Liberal

Jewish leader
- Position: Rabbi
- Synagogue: Glasgow Reform Synagogue 1944–1948; West London Synagogue 1948–1957; Bulawayo Progressive Congregation 1957–1977
- Semikhah: 1936

Rabbi Curtis E Cassell, born Kurt Kassell (8 November 1912 – 8 October 1998), was a rabbi in Germany, the United Kingdom and Rhodesia (now Zimbabwe). He came to the United Kingdom in 1939 as a refugee from Nazi Germany and became a British citizen in 1946.

Cassell graduated from the Hochschule für die Wissenschaft des Judentums in Berlin and received his semicha in 1936 from Rabbi Leo Baeck.

He was rabbi at the synagogue in Frankfurt an der Oder in succession to Ignaz Maybaum and, after coming to Britain and serving in the Royal Pioneer Corps, became minister at Glasgow Reform Synagogue from 1944 to 1948 and second minister at West London Synagogue from 1948 to 1957. From 1957 to 1977 he was rabbi of the Progressive Jewish Congregation in Bulawayo, Rhodesia (now Zimbabwe). In the late 1980s he was visiting rabbi to Bristol & West Progressive Synagogue.

Curtis Cassell and his wife Cecilia had two sons: Charles Elias (Charlie), who was born in 1939 and David, born in 1947.

He died on 8 October 1998 and is buried at Golders Green Jewish Cemetery.
