= Jonathan Romain =

British rabbi (born 1954)

Rabbi Jonathan Romain MBE
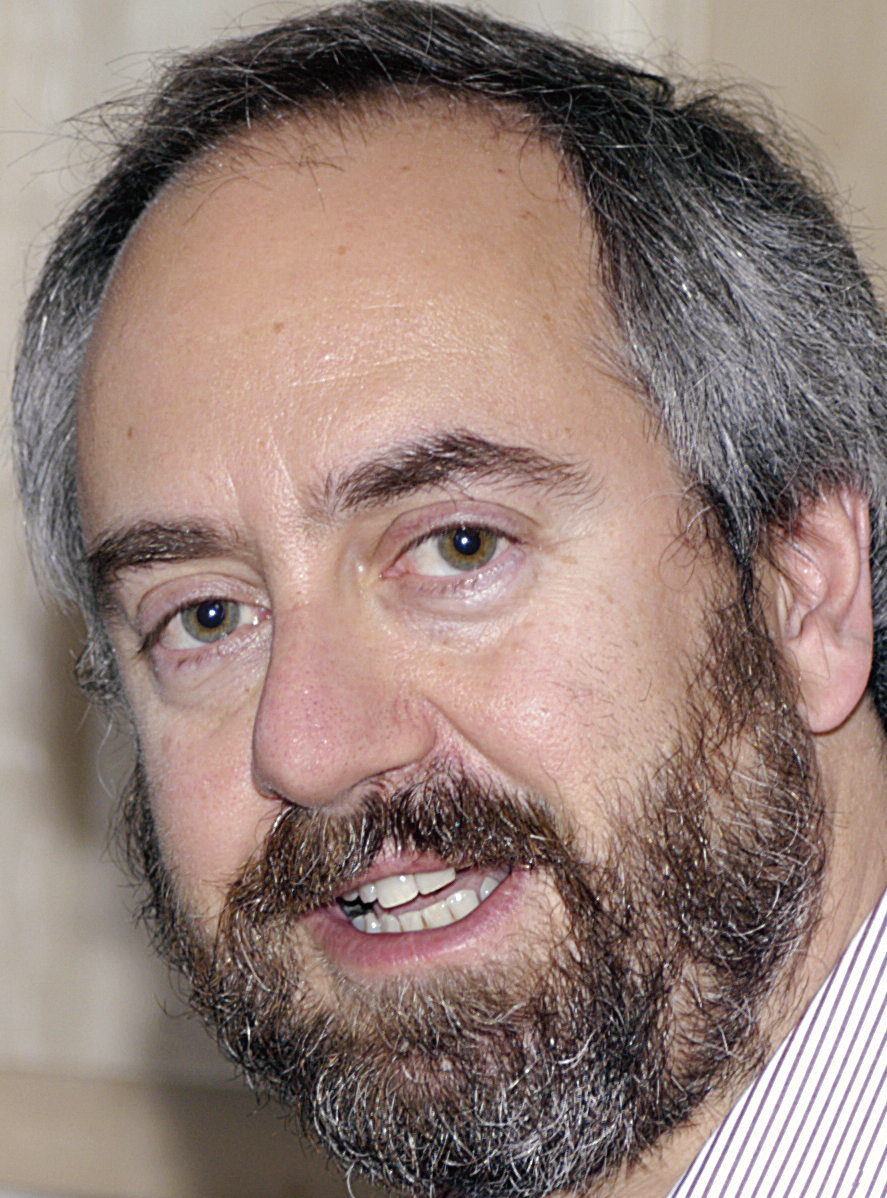
- The Rabbi Dr Jonathan Romain MBE

Personal life
- Born: Jonathan Anidjar Romain; 24 August 1954 (age 72) Hampstead, London, England
- Spouse: Rabbi Sybil Sheridan
- Children: Four sons (one deceased)

Religious life
- Religion: Judaism

Jewish leader
- Predecessor: Rabbi Jackie Tabick (2012–2023)
- Position: Convenor of the Reform Beit Din
- Organisation: Progressive Judaism
- Began: 2023

Rabbi Dr Jonathan Anidjar Romain MBE (born 24 August 1954) is a writer and broadcaster and Convenor of Progressive Judaism's Reform Beit Din. He has a PhD in the history of British Jewry. He writes for The Times, The Independent, The Guardian, The Huffington Post, and The Jewish Chronicle and appears on radio and television.

== Professional career ==
Rabbi Jonathan Romain is Convenor of the Reform Beit Din (Rabbinic Court), a position he took up in 2023.

He was Rabbi of Maidenhead Synagogue from 1980 to 2024, and remains as the community’s Rabbi Emeritus. He attributes the Maidenhead congregation’s huge growth during his tenure, from 72 households to 947, to the rebranding of the synagogue from a house of prayer to a community centre, telling The Jewish Chronicle: "I honestly don’t care if people come to services on a Saturday, the film evening on a Sunday or the walking group midweek. It’s coming that counts and being part of the community in whatever way they feel comfortable.”

From 2007 to 2009, he chaired the Movement for Reform Judaism's Assembly of Rabbis and Cantors. He was a key figure in the 2025 unification of the Movement for Reform Judaism and Liberal Judaism into one Progressive Judaism for the UK and Ireland, regularly writing and speaking in favour of the merger.

For several years he was one of the judges for both The Times Preacher of the Year competition and the BBC's Frank Gillard Awards for religious programmes.

He is chaplain to the Jewish Police Association, and until 2018 chaired the Accord Coalition, which he helped found as an alliance of religious and non-religious groups committed to campaigning against religious discrimination in state-funded faith schools.

In 2014 he established Inter-faith leaders for Dignity in Dying (IFDiD), an inter-faith group of clergy, now numbering 50 leaders of many religious affiliations who support the aims of Dignity in Dying. The group calls for a change in the law that would allow terminally ill, mentally competent adults the choice of an having themselves die.

== Actions and views ==
Rabbi Jonathan Romain has been a leading advocate for the inclusion of mixed-faith/dual-heritage couples and families in Judaism, a key principle of Progressive Judaism. In 1988, he set up a seminar for couples where one partner was Jewish and the other not. The Jewish Chronicle described his work with mixed-faith couples as "pioneering".

In 2013, he launched a campaign for recognition of Judaism in China.

In July 2014, Romain welcomed Lord Carey's support for the Assisted Dying Bill, describing the former archbishop of Canterbury's intervention in the debate as "a breath of fresh air" and saying that Carey's change of view on the issue showed "it is possible to be both religious and in favour of assisted dying".

His perspective on same-sex marriage – in line with that of Progressive Judaism – is that marriage should be open to all. He argues that "anyone who takes sacred religious texts literally needs to move on with the times... The Bible is not the literal word of God, but the inspiration of God, as perceived by people of that era and subject to the limitations of the period. It, therefore, has to constantly adapt according to new knowledge and new insights."

He supports the legalisation of brothels, referring to Genesis and pointing out that "it is not for nothing that it [prostitution] is known as the oldest profession", adding: "It may be more messianic to want to end the sex trade altogether, but perhaps it is more religious to seek to channel it safely."

In 2014, on the issue of women becoming bishops in the Church of England he was quoted as saying: "Women have long been accepted as rabbis and have gone on to occupy positions of religious authority in both major synagogues and Jewish institutions. Those who thought Judaism would collapse when this happened have been proved resoundingly wrong and I am sure the same will be found in the Church."

In 2025, he spoke in favour of circumcision of boys – arguing that it is not just a deeply significant part of both Jewish and Muslim traditions, but also that it is safe, carried out by medical professionals and practised by many people outside of faith communities for health and hygiene reasons.

== Honours ==
In 2003, he was appointed MBE for his pioneering work in helping mixed-faith couples nationally, a theme covered in his book Till Faith Us Do Part (HarperCollins).

== Personal life ==
He is married to Rabbi Sybil Sheridan, with whom he had four sons. One of their sons, Benedict, died from drowning while on his honeymoon in the Philippines in January 2023.

== Publications ==
=== Books ===
- Signs and Wonders: a new method of teaching Hebrew, Michael Goulston Educational Foundation (1985; New edition 1992) ISBN 0907372023 ISBN 978-0907372028
- The Jews of England, Jewish Chronicle Publications (1988) ISBN 978-0-907372-04-2
- Faith and Practice: A Guide to Reform Judaism Today, Reform Synagogues of Great Britain (1991) ISBN 9780947884086
- (with Anne Kershen) Tradition and Change: A History of Reform Judaism in Britain 1840–1995, Reform Synagogues of Great Britain (1995) ISBN 0853033161 (hardback) ISBN 085303298X (paperback)
- Till Faith Us Do Part: Couples Who Fall in Love Across the Religious Divide, HarperCollins (1996) ISBN 0006279252
- Renewing the Vision, SCM Press (1996) ISBN 0334026571
- Your God Shall Be My God: religious conversion in Britain today, SCM Press (2000) ISBN 0334028094 ISBN 978-0334028093
- Reform Judaism and Modernity: A Reader, a survey of Reform theology, SCM Press (2004) ISBN 0334029481 ISBN 978-0334029489
- God, Doubt and Dawkins, Movement for Reform Judaism (2008) ISBN 978-0947884-17-8
- Really Useful Prayers, Movement for Reform Judaism (2009) ISBN 978-0-947884-20-8
- Great Reform Lives, Movement for Reform Judaism (2010) ISBN 978-0947884215
- A Passion for Judaism, Movement for Reform Judaism (2011) ISBN 978-0947884222
- Royal Jews: A Thousand Years of Jewish Life in and Around the Royal County of Berkshire, Grenfell Publishing (2013) ISBN 978-0957698604
- (as editor) Assisted Dying – Rabbinic Responses, Movement for Reform Judaism (2014) ISBN 978-0947884246
- Terror, Trauma and Tragedy, Movement for Reform Judaism (2016), (with David Mitchell) ISBN 978-0947884253
- Confessions of a Rabbi, Biteback Publishing (2017) ISBN 978-1785901898
- Inclusive Judaism, (2020) (Jessica Kingsley) ISBN 978-1-78592-544-3
- What Makes Me Angry, Howls of Rabbinic Rage... and Solutions, Movement for Reform Judaism (2022) ISBN 978-0-947884-26-0
- The Naked Rabbi, John Hunt Publishing (2022) ISBN 978-1-78904-729-5

=== Newspaper articles ===
- Contributions to The Guardian
- Contributions to The Huffington Post
- Contributions to The Independent
- "Rabbi, I have a problem" contributions to The Jewish Chronicle
