= Danny Rich (rabbi) =

British Liberal rabbi

- Born: South London
- Occupations: Rabbi; Chief Executive of Liberal Judaism (until 2020)
- Political party: Labour
- Children: 4

Danny Rich is a Labour councillor and mayor for 2025-26 of the London Borough of Barnet. He was, until 2020, the Senior Rabbi and Chief Executive of Liberal Judaism in the United Kingdom.

== Early life and education ==
Danny Rich was born in London, and attended Hearnville Primary School and Sir Walter St. John's Grammar School, where he was head boy. Following his A-levels in German, History, and Government and Politics, he worked for the London Fire Brigade before entering Manchester University to study Politics and Modern History, doing his undergraduate thesis on The Palestinian Experience in Jordan: 1948–1970 and maintaining an active role in student politics, being twice elected chairperson of Manchester University Students' Union. During this time, he also served as a visiting lay minister for Leicester Progressive Jewish Congregation, and as a teacher/service leader at Manchester Reform Synagogue. In 1984, Rich began rabbinical training at Leo Baeck College, a privately funded rabbinical seminary in the UK for Liberal and Reform rabbis. While there, he continued to serve at Leicester Progressive Jewish Congregation, and began teaching at North Western Reform Synagogue (Alyth Gardens). He served as an assistant to Rabbi Julia Neuberger at South London Liberal Synagogue, as part-time minister to Kingston Liberal Synagogue, and as student rabbi to Hull and South Hampshire Reform communities, before returning to serve as the full-time Rabbi at Kingston in 1988, where he was ordained in 1989.

== Kingston Liberal Synagogue and public service ==
As Kingston Liberal Synagogue's first full-time rabbi, Rich served until 2004, when he was appointed emeritus rabbi. During his period of service at Kingston, he co-founded and chaired the Kingston Interfaith Forum, a group to promote communication and understanding between the faith groups in the borough. He also served as the director of Kadimah Summer Camp from 1990 to 2005. In 1996, he was appointed as a Justice of the Peace (magistrate) in the Kingston Court, presiding over cases until the court's closure in 2011, when he presided over the court's last trial. Rabbi Rich also serves as a prison, hospital and hospice chaplain. He is currently Jewish chaplain to Her Majesty's Prison Coldingley, and formerly to the open prison Latchmere House until the prison's closure in 2011, as well as for Kingston Hospital, and Oaklands National Health Service (NHS) Trust. He also served as Jewish mental health chaplain to Surrey and Borders Partnership NHS Foundation Trust. As a part of his involvement as a prison chaplain, he received a diploma in criminology from the Scarman Centre for the Study of Public Order (Leicester University) in 2001. He is a former Trustee of Mental Aid Projects and a former Governor at Hinchley Wood Junior School.

== Liberal Judaism ==
In 2004, Rich was named as the chief executive of Liberal Judaism, a progressive Jewish movement founded in the UK in the early part of the 20th century. Rabbi Rich was preceded in this role by Harriet Karsh, who had assumed the role from her predecessor, Rabbi Dr. Charles Middleburgh. Prior to this appointment, Rich had served as the chair of the Rabbinic Conference of Liberal Judaism, a board composed of all the Rabbis serving Liberal synagogues in the UK that meets regularly to discuss and rule on rabbinic matters, determining courses of action or principles of faith.

He is on the board of governors at Leo Baeck College, where he had served previously as the director of the college's Apprenticeship, Internship and Mentoring Program. A regular in the media, Rich has made frequent appearances on the BBC, Sky TV, ITV and in the Jewish and national press.

=== Interfaith affiliations ===
Many of Rich's affiliations reflect a position of the promotion of interfaith understanding. He is the UK regional representative for the World Union for Progressive Judaism (WUPJ). He also holds a Certificate in Jewish/Muslim relations from the Woolf Institute, Cambridge. He is an organiser and frequent contributor to Scriptural Reasoning, an organisation that promotes shared scriptural readings between Jews, Christians, Muslims and members of other faiths. He is one of the presidents of the Council of Christians and Jews, He is a co-founder of the Surrey Three Faiths Forum, and in 2011 became a founding member of the Council of Imams and Rabbis.

=== The JFS case ===
In 2009, a case was brought before the High Court where a 12-year-old boy, referred to in the case as M, was denied entry to the Jewish Free School (JFS) because, although his father was born a Jew and both his father and mother actively practised the Jewish faith, the mother had converted to Judaism in a non-Orthodox synagogue, failing to meet the school's criteria for the child being Jewish. As a spokesperson for Liberal Judaism (which recognizes patrilineal as well as matrilineal Jewish descent), Rich was actively vocal in supporting M's case, stating that JFS, as a state-funded school, had an obligation to be open to all forms of Judaism. The school was found to be in violation of the Race Relations Act, and is now required to admit its students on the basis of Jewish faith, rather than by the maternal blood line. Following the court's decision, Danny Rich, along with Liberal Judaism chairman Lucian J. Hudson, issued a statement in The Jewish Chronicle in support of the ruling, stating that JFS had "risked the Jewish community being portrayed as more concerned with petty, territorial squabbles than providing the best of Jewish education to the widest number of Jews".

=== Same-sex marriages ===
Rich is a vocal proponent in favour of legalising same-sex unions. In 2005, Liberal Judaism under the direction of Rich became the first mainstream religious movement in the UK to publish an official liturgy for same-sex commitment ceremonies. In February 2013, Rich presented evidence to the House of Commons Public Bill Committee looking into the Marriage (Same Sex Couples) Bill, reiterating Liberal Judaism's stance on the issue, stating that "although Liberal Judaism respects the right of other religious movements to decline to conduct marriages which go against their teachings, and to have this right protected in law, it also seeks, in the name of freedom of religion, the right to conduct marriages which it sees as legitimate, and as an important pastoral service to its members."

=== Considered Engagement controversy ===
In January 2012, Rabbi Rich drew criticism for sharing a debate panel with an anti-Israel activist. He stood by his decision to do so, citing Liberal Judaism's policy of Considered Engagement, a policy where the movement's chief executive, chairman and other national officers review invitations to participate in events based on their goals, even if the hosting or participating organisation are not in accord with the policies of Liberal Judaism.

=== The confirmation of Rabbi Ephraim Mirvis ===
When Rabbi Ephraim Mirvis was named Chief Rabbi of the United Hebrew Congregations of the Commonwealth in December 2012, Rich issued a statement welcoming his appointment, but said that the hardest part of the job would be recognising that the position "no longer represents a large section of the community".

=== Expanded religious education in the UK school system ===
In October 2013, A Curriculum Framework for Religious Education in England was issued by the Religious Education Council of England and Wales, stating is part that, "All children need to acquire core knowledge and understanding of the beliefs and practices of the religions and worldviews which not only shape their history and culture but which guide their own development." Rich wrote a column in Haaretz in support of the publication, calling for comprehensive religious education in both single-faith and secular schools, stating that "religious education has never been more important".

=== The "pickling" of Judaism by the Charedi ===
The 2012 statistics report for Britain's Jewish Community, issued in November 2013 by the Board of Deputies of British Jews, noted a "natural increase" in Britain's Jewish population, with specific mention of Britain's Charedi (Orthodox) community, who were responsible for four out of every ten Jewish births and more than three in ten weddings. In response to these numbers, Rich issued remarks that have generated some controversy, stating that the Orthodox community "pickled" Jewish tradition rather than preserving it, by refusing to engage with the outside world.

=== The admission of Syrian refugees into the UK ===
In January 2014, Rich took part in a delegation of rabbis who delivered a petition to 10 Downing Street, calling on the government to allow Syrian refugees into the UK. He issued a statement that read in part, "For Jews, Jewish teaching demands that we find ways of alleviating the suffering and in the name of our faith we call on the British government to allow Syrian refugees into the UK."

== Publications ==
- "Liberal Judaism and Mixed Marriage" in David J. Goldberg and Edward Kessler (eds): Aspects of Liberal Judaism: essays in honour of John D. Rayner, pp. 113–123, Vallentine Mitchell, London; Portland, Oregon (2004) ISBN 0853036012 (cloth); ISBN 0853035938 (paper)
- "Why we must urgently co-operate: Delegitimising other Jews puts our future at risk", The Jewish Chronicle, 12 September 2008
- Articles by Danny Rich in The Guardian newspaper 2008-09
- "Zionism: The Case for Fair-Mindedness On All Sides" in Zionism: a Jewish Communal Response from the UK, pp 23–29, Board of Deputies of British Jews, (2010)
- "A Jewish View of Jesus", Lecture delivered at University Campus Suffolk during Interfaith Week, 22 November 2010
- Evidence from Danny Rich to the Commission on Assisted Dying, chaired by Lord Falconer, 19 January 2011
- Muslim Perceptions Of 'The Other' (2011)
- Submission to the Public Bill Committee on the Marriage (Same Sex Couples) Bill, February 2012
- "The chuppah awaits: Liberal Jews drive the U.K.’s equal marriage campaign", Haaretz, 2 July 2013
