= The Ark Synagogue =

Liberal Synagogue in Northwood, UK

- Location within Greater London

Religion
- Affiliation: Liberal Judaism
- Ecclesiastical or organisational status: Synagogue (active)
- Leadership: Senior Rabbis: Aaron Goldstein and Lea Mühlstein.

Location
- Location: 18-24 Oaklands Gate, Northwood, HA6 3AA, United Kingdom
- Coordinates: 51.6127°N 0.4251°W

Architecture
- Established: 1964 (Pinner & District Liberal Synagogue) 1966 (Northwood & Pinner Liberal Synagogue) 2020 (The Ark Synagogue)

Website
- https://www.arksynagogue.org/

The Ark Synagogue is a Liberal Judaism Synagogue situated in Northwood, in a northwest London suburb, in the London Borough of Hillingdon, in the United Kingdom. It was founded in 1964 and is the largest Liberal Jewish synagogue outside of central London with over 1100 adult and 300 younger members. Previously known as Northwood and Pinner Liberal Synagogue (NPLS), in December 2020 it adopted the name "The Ark Synagogue".

== Local community ==
The Ark Synagogue has a membership of 1100 adults and approximately 300 children and junior members (under 18 years of age).

In 2010 the synagogue's Bereavement Support Group, founded by Sharon Goldstein in 1993, was awarded The Queen's Award for Voluntary Service, which was presented, in the sanctuary by Deputy Lieutenant, Wing Commander, Edna Partridge, representing the Queen.

They work with the local community and support local charities such as the Harrow Foodbank and homelessness and refugee projects, Holocaust memorial events, as well as participating in interfaith activities.

== Wider community ==
In 2014 the synagogue became one of the first Liberal and Reform Synagogue's to start live streaming both Friday and Saturday services. They have since celebrated their 200th Zoom Havdalah in January 2024.

Rabbis and members of The Ark Synagogue are represented on the boards of Liberal Judaism, the Board of Deputies of British Jews as well as Leo Baeck College, London.

The Synagogue is twinned with the congregations of Lviv (Teiva) in Ukraine.

== Rabbis ==
Rabbi Andrew Goldstein became the congregation's first rabbi in 1965. He went on to become President of Liberal Judaism from 2013 to 2022 and Honorary Life President of European Union for Progressive Judaism (EUPJ).

Goldstein's Yom Kippur address in 1978 was the starting point for NPLS's connection with Czech and Slovak Jewry.

Goldstein retired in 2008 and became rabbi emeritus of the synagogue. His son, Rabbi Aaron Goldstein, became the synagogue's senior rabbi. This was the first time in the UK Liberal movement that a son had succeeded his father as a synagogue's leader. Aaron Goldstein writes for The Guardian and Jewish News in addition to his rabbinical work.

The synagogue's other senior rabbi is Rabbi Lea Mühlstein. She was one of only two rabbis outside the U.S. to win at the Women of Reform Judaism Women's Empowerment Awards held in Chicago in 2020. She is also the Chair of the EUPJ and the Zionist Federation of Great Britain and Ireland as of 2023.

== Scrolls ==
In 1965 the Synagogue acquired the first of their Czech Memorial Torah scrolls which had been recovered from the Nazi sacking of Czechoslovak synagogues. They received a second scroll in 1971 originating from Třeboň. In a glass case on the wall of the Bimah is the torn remnant of another Scroll from Kladno that serves as a Holocaust memorial. In 1998 NPLS were presented a fourth Torah Scroll from Spišská Nová Ves.

In 2015 the first Torah scroll especially for the Synagogue was commissioned.

== History ==
- The Synagogue started in 1964 as the Pinner & District Liberal Congregation with 30 families.
- The congregation moved to a disused Methodist church in Hallowell Road in Northwood in 1966 and changed its name to Northwood & Pinner Liberal Synagogue (NPLS).
- A new synagogue building on Oaklands Gate was dedicated in 1981 and an Ark Surround was rescued from the Cemetery Chapel in Kolin (Czechoslovakia) and re-assembled in the synagogue. This was a permanent memorial to the many Jews from Kolin who were transported to the concentration camps by the Nazis.
- In 1990 the NPLS branch in Amersham became an independent synagogue - the South Bucks Jewish Community.
- Stained glass "feature" windows designed by Ruth Jacobson were completed in the Osorio Hall in 1997.
- In 2018 Cantor Tamara Wolfson became part-time cantor.
- In December 2020 NPLS adopted the name "The Ark Synagogue".
- In May 2024 The Ark Synagogue celebrated its 60th Anniversary with a service attended by Mayor of Hillingdon Cllr Colleen Sullivan, Mayor of Harrow Cllr Ramji Chauhan and Progressive Judaism Co-Lead Rabbi Charley Baginsky.

== See also ==
- List of Jewish communities in the United Kingdom
