= Progressive Judaism (United Kingdom) =

Jewish denomination in Britain

The Movement for Progressive Judaism - תנועת ליהדות המתקדמת
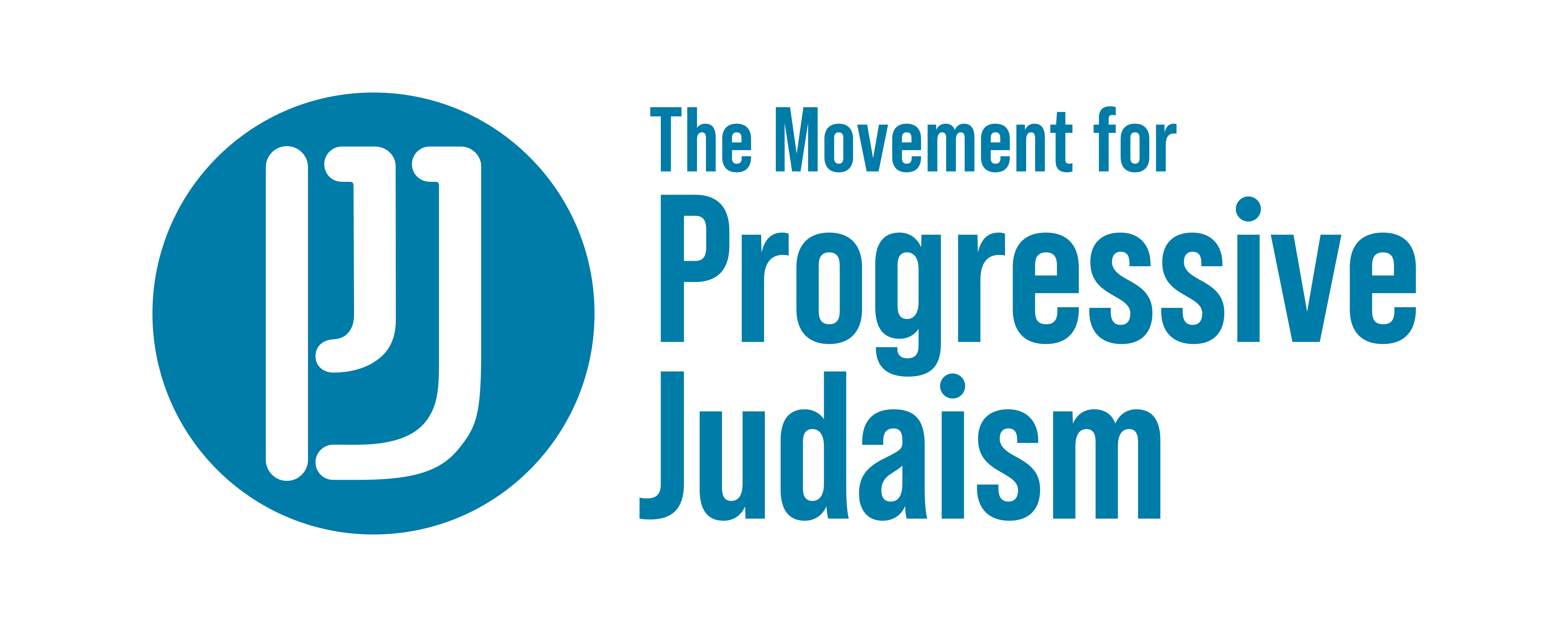
- Official logo of the Movement for Progressive Judaism
- Classification: Judaism
- Orientation: Progressive Judaism
- Theology: Progressive Judaism / Reform Judaism / Liberal Judaism
- Co-Leads: Rabbi Charley Baginsky and Rabbi Josh Levy
- Chair: Dr Edward Kessler; (from December 2026) Noeleen Cohen
- Chairs of Clergy Bodies: Rabbi Shulamit Ambalu; Rabbi Anna Wolfson
- Associations: World Union for Progressive Judaism
- Region: United Kingdom and Ireland
- Founder: The Movement for Reform Judaism; Liberal Judaism
- Congregations: 77
- Official website: www.progressivejudaism.org.uk

The Movement for Progressive Judaism, commonly known as Progressive Judaism, is a WUPJ-affiliated Jewish denomination in the United Kingdom and Ireland.

Formed by the merger of the Movement for Reform Judaism and Liberal Judaism, the new organisation is Britain's second largest Jewish denomination in terms of individual members, representing around 30% of synagogue-affiliated Jews. In terms of congregations, it is Britain's largest synagogue organisation, with 77 member communities across the UK and Ireland.

The Progressive approach to Judaism blends tradition with modernity, with a focus on shared values, diverse voices, and a commitment to inclusion and equality.

The intention to create one Progressive Judaism for the UK was first announced in April 2023 and then confirmed on 18 May 2025, when the member communities of both organisations voted to unite into one movement. The legal process to dissolve Reform/Liberal Judaism and substitute a singular Progressive Judaism was completed at the end of 2025.

Progressive Judaism is a member of the World Union for Progressive Judaism and dates its history back to the Haskalah (Jewish enlightenment) of the 1770s and the introduction of Reform Judaism to Britain from the 1840s.

== History ==
Reform Judaism in Britain dates back to the founding of the West London Synagogue in 1840. Liberal Judaism (then called the Jewish Religious Union) started in 1902; the Liberal Jewish Synagogue was founded in 1911.

The first recorded UK use of the term Progressive Judaism was in The Jewish Chronicle in 1857.

There were many attempts at merger between the two denominations, with the most serious discussions taking place in 1903, 1942 and 1983.

While these failed, the movements continued to work closely together. From 1956, both its rabbis trained at Leo Baeck College with many swapping pulpits between the denominations throughout their careers.

Differences between the two evaporated in the 21st century with Reform – previously seen as the more traditional – modernising and Liberal Judaism re-adopting discarded traditions. Both denominations came to very similar positions on principle and practice, “seeking to marry the traditions of the past with the realities of the present”.

This convergence led to closer ties between the two movements in the 2010s, led by Lucian Hudson, Simon Benscher and Rabbi Danny Rich on the Liberal side and Robert Weiner and Rabbi Laura Janner-Klausner for Reform. Their discussions around greater collaboration and potential federation gained momentum in the years that followed with an Alliance for Progressive Judaism, which was formed in 2014. The Alliance was however limited to certain areas such as student chaplaincy, social justice and social action.

In April 2023, exactly 120 years after the first attempts at unification, the Liberal and Reform Jewish movements announced plans to fully merge and create a single Progressive Judaism for the UK and Ireland. The project was led by Liberal Judaism CEO Rabbi Charley Baginsky and Chair Ruth Seager – and subsequently by Karen Newman who took over from Ruth Seager as Chair – and Reform Judaism CEO Rabbi Josh Levy and Chair Paul Langsford, as well as Dr Ed Kessler MBE, who chaired the Progressive Judaism Advisory Board.

In May 2025, the decision to merge was officially made at two parallel Extraordinary General Meetings (EGMs) of member communities, with the number of votes in favour at each exceeding 95%. It was described as the "biggest change and most significant development in British Judaism since the Second World War". Rabbi Josh Levy and Rabbi Charley Baginsky are Co-Leads of the new Progressive Judaism.

== Beliefs ==
Progressive Judaism (sometimes also referred to as Reform Judaism or Liberal Judaism) understands that the religion’s formative texts are not the literal word of God, but the divinely inspired work of human beings. It believes in Progressive revelation and the overriding importance of values and ethics in defining how people should behave.

In practical terms, Progressive Judaism’s fundamental principle is equality. Services are egalitarian with everyone sitting together and all able to read from the Torah. The British Progressive clergy (of rabbis and cantors) is 50% women and 20% LGBTQI+. Boys and girls are both bar/bat mitzvah at age 13.

In British and Irish Progressive Judaism (as well as in North American and Australasian Progressive/Reform Judaism), Jewish status can be inherited from either parent where a child is brought up as Jewish, sometimes referred to as equilineal descent. Traditionally Jewish status has been inherited from the mother, as still practised by Orthodox and other forms of Judaism. Equilineal descent was first introduced in 1955.

Modern Progressive Jewish liturgy uses gender-inclusive language, avoiding masculine terms for God such as 'Lord', 'King' and 'He' and, through substitutions such as 'ancestors' for 'fathers', ensuring that women are not subsumed under men In 1995, Rabbi John Rayner explained: "The truth is: literally, God is neither male nor female; metaphorically, God is both!". Writing in 2024, Rabbi Paul Freedman said: "God's name is no longer translated as 'the Lord' but, without the male (and feudal) associations, as 'the Eternal' or 'Eternal One', capturing something of the meaning of the Hebrew word." Any new Progressive prayer books are also released with transliteration, Hebrew spelt out phonetically in English so anyone can follow and read along.

According to Rabbi Josh Levy, Progressive Judaism is a Zionist movement that is committed to a "Jewish, liberal, pluralist, democratic state in our historic homeland". However, Levy has noted that the Gaza War has troubled many British Jews and that critics of Israel would not be ostracised from the movement. Rabbi Charley Baginsky has stated that the movement allows for critique of Israel, stating that a person can be Jewish and a proud Zionist while believing "the Israeli government does not speak with our voice".

=== Marriage ===
UK Progressive communities fully welcome mixed-faith families and hold dual-heritage wedding blessings. A 2005 resolution allows synagogues to decide about blessing of same-sex unions, and a 2012 resolution allows local synagogues to decide about same-sex marriage.
