= Nancy Morris =

Reform rabbi

Rabbi Nancy Morris

Personal life
- Born: 2 November 1961 (age 64) Montreal, Quebec, Canada
- Website: www.rabbinancymorris.com

Religious life
- Religion: Judaism
- Denomination: Movement for Reform Judaism

Jewish leader
- Predecessor: Rabbi Maurice Michaels, Rabbi Michael Pertz
- Position: Rabbi
- Synagogue: South West Essex and Settlement Reform Synagogue
- Began: 2012
- Ended: 2014
- Semikhah: Leo Baeck College

Nancy Morris (born 2 November 1961) is a Reform rabbi, who was appointed to Glasgow Reform Synagogue, formerly known as Glasgow New Synagogue, in October 2003, making her the first female rabbi in Scotland. She was Rabbi of South West Essex and Settlement Reform Synagogue in London from 2012 until 2014.

Morris was born in Montreal, Quebec, where she qualified in Law before studying for the rabbinate in London, qualifying in 2002.

== Career ==
Morris gained an MA in Jewish History from McGill University in 1989 before continuing her studies to gain an LLB, also at McGill University, before completing her articles at Blake, Cassels & Graydon in Toronto.

In 1997, she decided upon a career change and left Canada to study rabbinics at Leo Baeck College in London, graduating in 2002.

In the final year of rabbinic studies, she returned to Canada where she served as Rabbi at Har Tikvah, in Brampton, Ontario and Temple Shalom, in Kitchener, Ontario/Waterloo, Ontario from 2001 till 2003.

She became the first female Rabbi in Scotland when she was appointed to the post of Rabbi of Glasgow Reform Synagogue in October 2003. During her tenure, Rabbi Morris was also a Guest Lecturer at the University of Glasgow where she lectured on Judaism.

In January 2012, Rabbi Morris returned to her native Canada to take on a temporary post of Rabbi at Temple B'nai Tikvah in Calgary.

In June 2012, South West Essex and Settlement Reform Synagogue (often referred to by the acronym SWESRS) in London announced that Rabbi Morris had been appointed as their new Rabbi. She began this position in September 2012 and held the role until 2014, when she and her husband returned to Toronto.

Morris strongly supports the egalitarian nature of Progressive Judaism and has spoken a number of times on issues relating to gender equality within Judaism. She was strongly critical of the arrest of Anat Hoffman, head of Women Of The Wall, and publicly wrote to the Israeli Ambassador to the UK on behalf of her congregation about the arrest.

Morris also called on the incoming Chief Rabbi to demonstrate his commitment to repairing divisions between different Jewish traditions by publicly criticising the detention of Emily Wolfson for wearing a Tallit at the Kotel. Morris conducted Wolfson's Bat Mitzvah as Rabbi at Glasgow Reform Synagogue.

Morris presented the Time For Reflection at the Scottish Parliament on 25 June 2008.

== Connections with East End of London ==
Rabbi Morris' paternal grandfather grew up in London's East End in the early 1900s before emigrating to Canada. This family connection partly influenced Rabbi Morris to take up the post at SWESRS as the synagogue has a strong connection with the East End. In an amazing coincidence, when researching her family history, Rabbi Morris discovered she was also related to Second Lieutenant Harry Jassby, a World War I Royal Air Force pilot who was killed on 6 November 1918 at an airfield very close to the Oaks Lane location of SWESRS. Despite being Jewish, Second Lieutenant Jassby was buried in the Christian cemetery at St Peter's Church which was the closest graveyard to the airfield where he was killed. Members of SWESRS look after the grave and Rabbi Morris conducts an annual Remembrance Service at the graveside.

== Broadcasting ==
Rabbi Morris was interviewed by Ian Wyatt on his BBC Essex radio programme on which she discussed her career and decision to become a Rabbi. Wyatt also explored her thoughts on the atheist arguments of Richard Dawkins concerning religion. Rabbi Morris explained she feels his arguments focus too much on disputing the literalist interpretation of scriptures as emphasized by religious fundamentalists. Fundamentalism is only espoused by very extremist groups of religious people, and the vast majority of people of faith do not necessarily take such a literalist view of Scripture. Dawkins, in her opinion, fails to address the wider social, emotional, spiritual and cultural benefits for human beings who are devoted to their religious beliefs. Rabbi Morris particularly loves the discussion and lively debate that forms such an important part of Jewish tradition and understanding of Judaism throughout its history.

Rabbi Morris appeared regularly on BBC Radio Scotland's Thought For The Day slot where she presented, from a Jewish perspective, brief talks designed to cause listeners to pause for reflection.

Rabbi Morris also contributed to the BBC radio programme on Matisyahu with her predecessor at Glasgow Reform Synagogue, Rabbi Pete Tobias.

== Publications ==
Rabbi Morris studied in Vienna for a year while she wrote her Master's thesis on the subject of Ludwig Frankl. It is available to view on the McGill University website.

Rabbi Morris contributed to the book God, Doubt and Dawkins, a Reform response to Richard Dawkins' book The God Delusion.

She also publishes selected Torah commentary and articles on her own website.
