= Oaks Lane Reform Synagogue =

Synagogue in England

- Location of the synagogue in Greater London

Religion
- Affiliation: Reform Judaism
- Ecclesiastical or organizational status: Synagogue
- Leadership: Rabbi Jordan Helfman
- Status: Active

Location
- Location: Oaks Lane, Newbury Park Ilford, Borough of Redbridge, London, England
- Country: United Kingdom
- Interactive map of Oaks Lane Reform Synagogue
- Coordinates: 51°34′37″N 0°5′41″E

Architecture
- Established: 1956 (as a congregation)
- Completed: 1966

Website
- swesrs.org.uk

Oaks Lane Reform Synagogue is a Reform Jewish congregation and synagogue on Oaks Lane, Newbury Park in Ilford, in the Borough of Redbridge, London, England. The congregation is a member of the Movement for Reform Judaism.

== History ==
The forebears of the congregation date from c. 1919 when the Oxford & St George's Settlement Synagogue was established in Stepney. This congregation subsequently changed its name to St. George's Settlement Synagogue and then later to Settlement Synagogue. It was the only congregation that was concurrently affiliated with both the Movement for Reform Judaism and Liberal Judaism.

Founded in 1956 as S.W. Essex Synagogue, the congregation changed its name in c. 1966 to the South-West Essex Reform Synagogue (also known as SWERS), and later spelled as South West Essex Reform Synagogue. In 1961 - on the festival of Sukkot - the synagogue formed a mixed SATB choir to add music throughout services. The choir still survives to this day and frequently uses music either written or arranged 'in-house' by various former choristers, choirmasters and accompanists.

In 1997, the congregation merged with the Settlement Synagogue to form the South West Essex and Settlement Reform Synagogue. In September 2023, the merged congregation adopted its current name (although the change of name is to be a working name and not a formal change of the synagogue's name).

A tag line of "Honouring our Past, Building our Future" was also adopted.

== Clergy ==
The following individuals have served as rabbi of the congregation:

Ordinal	Officeholder	Term start	Term end	Time in office	Notes
1	Alan W. Miller	c. 1958	c. 1961	2–3 years	
2	Dow Marmur	c. 1963	c. 1969	5–6 years	
3	Nicholas Ginsbury	c. 1970	c. 1973	2–3 years	
4	Henry Goldstein	c. 1973	2001	27–28 years	All subsequently emeritus
5	Lawrence Rigál	1997	c. 2006	8–9 years	All subsequently emeritus
6	Maurice Arnold Michaels	c. 2000	c. 2011	10–11 years	All subsequently emeritus
−	Stephen Howard	2011	2012	0–1 years	Interim rabbi
7	Nancy Morris	2012	2014	1–2 years	
−	Dr. Jackie Tabick	2015	2016	0–1 years	Interim rabbi
8	Lisa Barrett	2016	May 2021	4–5 years	
9	Jordan Helfman	January 2022	incumbent	4 years, 210 days	Formerly of Holy Blossom Temple,

Additionally, the congregation has been served by the following, as associate rabbis, Rabbi G.C. Goldberg (c. 1978–c. 1980); Rabbi Howard Cooper (c. 1980–c. 1982); Rabbi Michael Pertz (c. 2004–c. 2011); and Rabbi Lev Taylor (since July 2022). Lev Taylor vacated his position with effect from 10 July 2024.

== See also ==
- History of the Jews in England
- List of Jewish communities in the United Kingdom
- List of synagogues in the United Kingdom
