= Lucian Hudson =

British academic

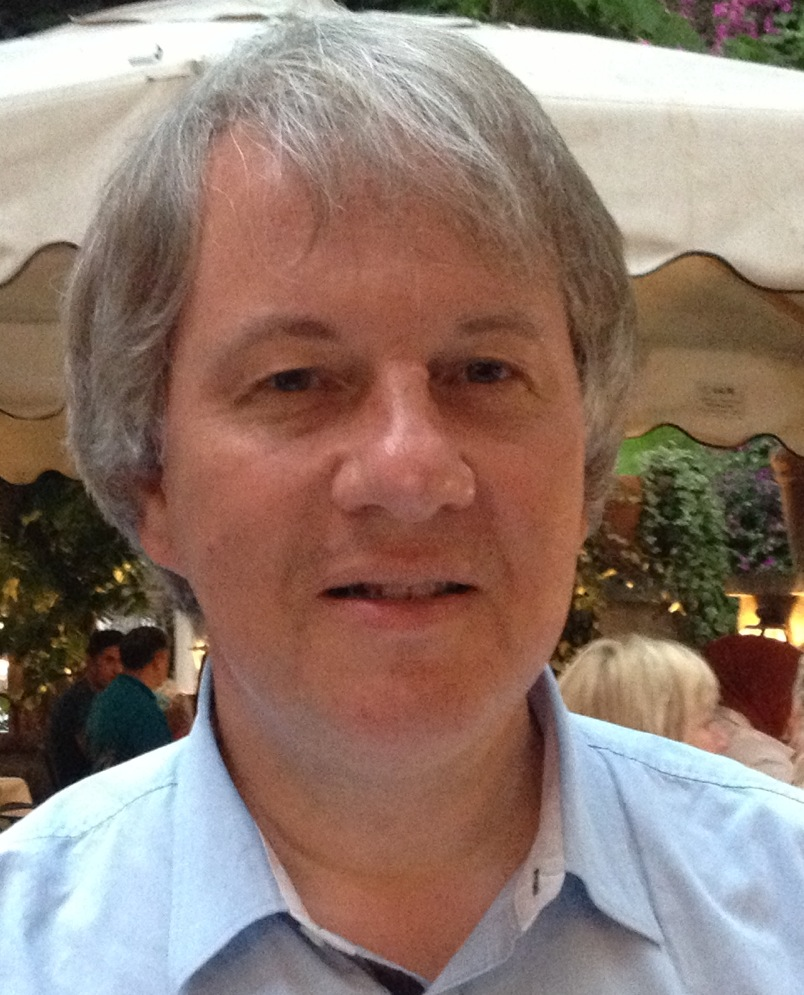
- Lucian J. Hudson
- Education: MA in Philosophy, Politics and Economics
- Alma mater: St Catherine's College at Oxford University
- Occupations: Board Chair and Communications Director

Lucian John Hudson (born 1960) is a strategy and communications specialist from the UK, experienced in cross-sector collaboration.

== Early life and education ==
Hudson was born on 5 July 1960 in London to Polish parents, Jan and Wanda Maria Pikulski. He has a degree in philosophy, politics and economics from St Catherine's College, Oxford.

== Religion and conversion to Judaism ==
Hudson was brought up as a Roman Catholic. He was educated by Jesuits but he became interested in Judaism. He converted to Judaism in 2005.

By 2009, he became Chair of Liberal Judaism, developing over his six years in office a vision and strategy for the movement and closer collaboration with the leadership of UK Jewry and the Movement for Reform Judaism. The latter helped pave the way for the unification of Liberal and Reform Judaism into one Progressive Judaism (United Kingdom) in 2025.

== Career ==
Hudson was an executive producer and television journalist for 17 years with the BBC and ITV. He led the production of the first six hours of BBC coverage on the night Diana, Princess of Wales died.

He was director of communications in three UK government departments, including the Foreign and Commonwealth Office, as well as the UK government's first "webmaster general". In 2013 Hudson served as an independent expert reviewing the communications capability of the Cabinet Office and No. 10 Downing Street.

In 2020 he was appointed Director of Advancement, Marketing and Communications at Durham University, having served as Interim Director of Public Affairs and Communications at the University of Oxford, and Communications Director of The Open University. From June 2025, he became Executive Director, Communications & External Relations as his responsibilities now also include public affairs.

With effect from January 2023, he is also Professor in Practice (Leadership and Organisations) in the Department of Management and Marketing at Durham University Business School.

He is board chair and trustee of Earthwatch Europe, Chair of Tavistock Institute of Human Relations as well as a vice-president of the Liberal Judaism in the United Kingdom.

In September 2026, Hudson received the Freedom of the City of London in recognition of his contributions to civic engagement, cross-sector collaboration and environmental affairs.
