= Maidenhead Synagogue =

Reform synagogue in Berkshire, England

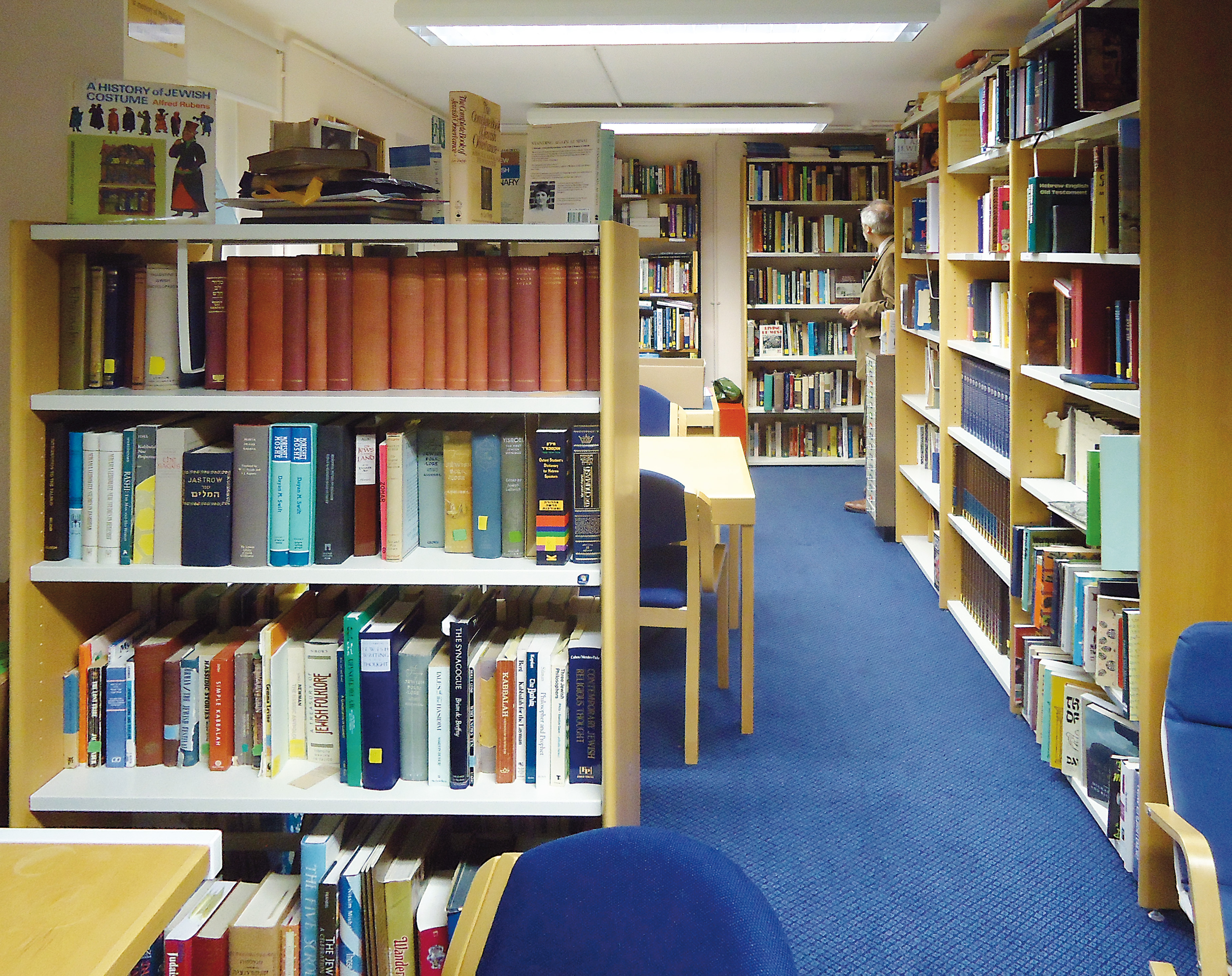
- Interior of the synagogue library, in 2004

- Location of the synagogue in southern England

Religion
- Affiliation: Reform Judaism
- Ecclesiastical or organizational status: Synagogue
- Leadership: Rabbi René Pfertzel
- Status: Active

Location
- Location: Grenfell Lodge, Ray Park Road, in Maidenhead, Berkshire, England SL6 8QX
- Country: United Kingdom
- Interactive map of Maidenhead Synagogue
- Coordinates: 51°31′34″N 0°42′26″W

Architecture
- Established: 1953 (as a congregation)
- Completed: 1953 (Boyn Hill); 2001 (Ray Park)

Website
- maidenheadsynagogue.org.uk

The Maidenhead Synagogue is a Reform Jewish congregation and synagogue, located at Grenfell Lodge, Ray Park Road, in Maidenhead, Berkshire, England, in the United Kingdom. It serves Berkshire, Buckinghamshire and surrounding districts west of London in the Thames Valley area.

== History ==
Maidenhead Synagogue originated during World War II when many Jewish families were evacuated to the area from London. It was initially a community with no dedicated building, meeting for prayer in private houses and served by a volunteer rabbi and lay readers. At the war's end, some of the congregation stayed in the area and established a permanent Jewish community, acquiring a house for use as a dedicated synagogue building in 1953.

The synagogue became part of the Reform Movement in 1960, so receiving the services of student rabbis of the Leo Baeck College, among them Jonathan Romain who was appointed as the synagogue's first full-time rabbi in 1980 and contunued in the role until 2024. The synagogue moved to larger premises in 2001 and the congregation had 1831 members in 2017. An extension to the synagogue, including a new community centre, was opened in 2017.

== Facilities ==
In addition to being a centre for worship, the synagogue's facilities include a library, a Judaica and kosher shop, a nursery school, a religion school, youth clubs, adult education classes, conversion classes, social activities for adults and children, a café, and a community care scheme.

For members unable to travel to the synagogue, Shabbat evening and Shabbat morning services are streamed live via the internet.

All members receive by post the synagogue's monthly community magazine, Hadashot (חדשות).

== See also ==
- History of the Jews in England
- List of Jewish communities in the United Kingdom
- List of synagogues in the United Kingdom
