= Belsize Square Synagogue =

Synagogue in London, England

- Location of the synagogue in London

Religion
- Affiliation: Independent
- Rite: Nusach Ashkenaz
- Ecclesiastical or organisational status: Synagogue
- Leadership: Rabbi Gabriel Botnick
- Status: Active

Location
- Location: 51 Belsize Square, Belsize Park, Hampstead, London, England, NW3 4HX
- Country: United Kingdom
- Coordinates: 51°32′50″N 0°10′13″W

Architecture
- Founder: Lily Montagu
- Established: 1939 (as a congregation)
- Completed: 1951

Website
- synagogue.org.uk

Belsize Square Synagogue is a continental Liberal Jewish congregation and synagogue, located in Belsize Park, Hampstead, in the Borough of Camden, London, England, in the United Kingdom. The congregation is independent of the two Progressive (Reform) Jewish movements in the United Kingdom, drawing from the worship tradition of German Liberal Judaism.

== Affiliation ==
Logo of the Belsize Square Synagogue congregation

Belsize Square Synagogue was founded in 1939 by refugees, mainly from Germany. Today, the membership of Belsize Square Synagogue comprises people who have joined from other strands of Judaism, alongside the families of its founders; this history is reflected in the dignity of its religious services, mainly conducted in Hebrew, and its music. This was mainly composed by Louis Lewandowski (b. 1821), who was based in Berlin and influenced by Felix Mendelssohn, and by Salomon Sulzer (b. 1804), a Viennese cantor and contemporary and friend of Franz Schubert.

== Services ==
Religious services are held every Friday evening and Saturday morning and on Jewish festivals and Belsize Square Synagogue is known by its music led by Cantor, Choir and organ following the German Liberale tradition and composers Louis Lewandowski (Berlin) and Salomon Sulzer (Vienna) between others. A Sunday tefilin minyan (congregation) meets occasionally with the future bnei Mitzvah kids and adults before Cheder's Assembly. Men and women sit together and both may be called up to read from the Torah. Children's services (known as Kikar Kids) are held on the first Saturday morning of the month.

Belsize Square Synagogue services are live-streamed via its website, with the support of grant funding from the Six Point Foundation, and by a donation from the Ann Hirschfield Trust. They have been especially vital to its own and the larger community during the COVID-19 restrictions, even weddings have been livestreamed.

== Education ==
Belsize Square has a cheder (religious school) for children and a regular adult discussion group, both meeting in term on Sunday mornings. An "Introduction to Judaism" class meets on Monday evenings, and forms part of Belsize Square Synagogue's programme of activities for people converting to Judaism.

This regular education programme is supplemented by ad hoc lectures, events, film presentations and short courses.

== Other activities ==
Belsize Square Synagogue has a programme of youth activities including weekend camps.

In conjunction with volunteers, the synagogue's community care co-ordinator provides support and assistance to older members of the congregation and others in need including those experiencing bereavement or ill-health.

Part of the Belsize Square Synagogue building is used by Kerens Day Nursery during the week.

== See also ==
- History of the Jews in England
- List of synagogues in the United Kingdom
