= John Rayner =

British rabbi (1924–2005)

Rabbi John Rayner

Personal life
- Born: Hans Sigismund Rahmer; 30 May 1924 Berlin, Weimar Republic
- Died: 19 September 2005 (aged 81) London, England
- Spouse: Jane Heilbronn (m. 1955)
- Children: 3
- Education: Emmanuel College, Cambridge; Hebrew Union College – Cincinnati

Religious life
- Religion: Judaism
- Denomination: Liberal Judaism

Jewish leader
- Position: Rabbi

Rabbi John Desmond Rayner CBE (30 May 1924 – 19 September 2005) was a Berlin-born British Liberal Jewish rabbi.

== Early life ==
He was born in Berlin as Hans Sigismund Rahmer in 1924. He left Berlin in 1939 on one of the last Kindertransports. The Kindertransport programme brought around 10,000 children to the UK. Both his parents, Ferdinand Rahmer and Charlotte Landshut, were murdered in the Holocaust.

Between 1943 and 1947 Rayner served in the British Army. In October 1947 he took up an open scholarship in modern languages that he had previously won at Emmanuel College, Cambridge five years earlier. In his second year he switched to Moral Science which comprised philosophy, logic, ethics and psychology and graduated in 1950 with First Class Honours. In his third year Rayner specialised in Hebrew, Aramaic, Syriac and Semitic Epigraphy. In his sixth year Rayner began working as a research student on a thesis about Maimonides' conception of Revelation.

== Career ==
Rayner was ordained in the Liberal Jewish ministry on 21 June 1953 and served the South London Liberal Synagogue, in Streatham until 1957. He then worked at St John's Wood Liberal Synagogue until in 1963 he left for Cincinnati, Ohio, in the United States. Rayner had been invited to the Hebrew Union College to take up a graduate fellowship. He returned to the UK to serve as Minister at the Liberal Jewish Synagogue in June 1965.

He wrote books on diverse topics including halakha, marriage, ethics, Zionism, theology and Jewish-Christian relations. He also gave a large number of sermons. He was voted one of the best preachers in Britain by Harpers and Queen magazine in 1976. During the late 1960s and 1970s Rayner made several appearances on national television and radio.

Working with American Rabbi Chaim Stern, Rayner was the main liturgist of British Liberal Judaism. They compiled the Sabbath and Festivals and High Holidays liturgy used by all Liberal Synagogues, Service of the Heart and Gates of Repentance, continuing their editorial partnership to co-edit Siddur Lev Chadash. He was the teacher of liturgy at Leo Baeck College in London.

He was an active participant in inter-faith work as co-chairman of the London Society of Christians and Jews. As a result of this work in 1993 he was appointed a Commander of the Order of the British Empire.

His thought emphasises the importance of ethics and the need for a more halakhic approach to Progressive Judaism.

== Personal life ==
Rayner married Jane Heilbronn in 1955 and had two sons and a daughter together.

On 19 September 2005 he died, at home, at the age of 81, after a long illness.

== Works ==
- The Practices of Liberal Judaism (1958).
- Service of the Heart (1967)
- Gates of Repentance (1973)
- Guide to Jewish Marriage (1975). ISBN 978-0900521058
- Judaism for Today (1978). ISBN 978-0900521096
- Siddur Lev Chadash (1995). ISBN 978-0900521201
- An Understanding of Judaism (Berghahn Books, December 1997). ISBN 978-1-57181-971-0
- A Jewish Understanding of the World (Berghahn Books, March 1998). ISBN 978-1571819734
- Jewish Religious Law. A Progressive Perspective (Berghahn Books, May 1998). ISBN 978-1-57181-976-5
- Principles of Jewish Ethics: From a Progressive Point of View (New Jewish initiative for social justice, 1998)
- Aspects of Liberal Jewish Thought (1999)
- Signposts to the Messianic Age: Sermons and Lectures, Vallentine Mitchell (2006). ISBN 978-0853037033
