= South London Liberal Synagogue =

Liberal synagogue in Streatham, London, England

- Location of the synagogue in the London Borough of Lambeth

Religion
- Affiliation: Liberal Judaism
- Rite: Liberal
- Ecclesiastical or organisational status: Synagogue
- Leadership: Rabbi Nathan Godleman
- Status: Active

Location
- Location: 1 Prentis Road, Streatham, Borough of Lambeth, London, England, SW16 1QB
- Country: United Kingdom
- Coordinates: 51°25′49″N 0°7′50″W

Architecture
- Founder: Samuel Morris Rich
- Established: 1929 (as a congregation)
- Completed: 1908 (as a school); 1938 (as a synagogue)

Website
- southlondon.org

The South London Liberal Synagogue is a Liberal Jewish congregation and synagogue, located at 1 Prentis Road in Streatham in the Borough of Lambeth, London, England, in the United Kingdom.

The rabbi of the congregation, since 2016, is Rabbi Nathan Godleman.

== History ==
The congregation was established in 1929 as one of the first Liberal Jewish congregations in the UK. Its first president was Lily Montagu, one of Liberal Judaism's founders. From 1929 until c. 1935, the congregation worshiped from Tudor Hall, on Pinfold Road, Streatham; and subsequently from Farnan Hall, on Hopton Road. The congregation moved to its present home in Prentis Road (formerly a girls’ school) in 1938.

It appointed its first full-time minister, Rabbi John Rayner, in 1953. The synagogue's ministers since then include Rabbi Julia Neuberger, minister from 1977 to 1989.

== See also ==
Logo of the congregation

- History of the Jews in England
- List of Jewish communities in the United Kingdom
- List of synagogues in the United Kingdom
