= Julia Neuberger =

British politician and rabbi (born 1950)

Rabbi The Right Honourable The Baroness Neuberger DBE
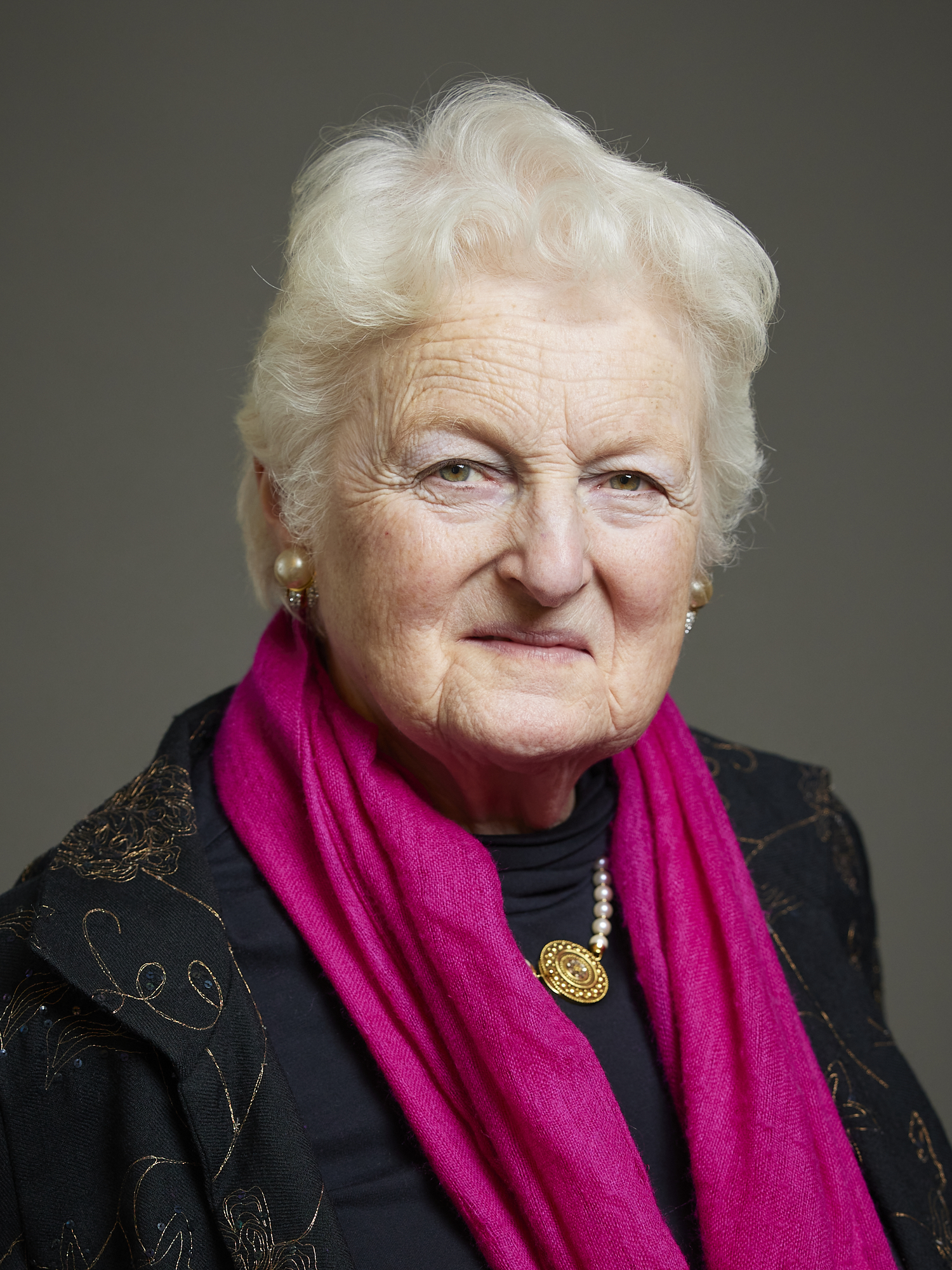
- Official portrait, 2023

Member of the House of Lords
- Lord Temporal
- Life peerage 15 June 2004

Personal details
- Born: Julia Babette Sarah Schwab; 27 February 1950 (age 76) London, England
- Party: None (crossbencher)
- Other political affiliations: Liberal Democrats (1988–2011); Social Democratic Party (Before 1988)
- Spouse: Anthony Neuberger (m. 1973)
- Children: 2
- Education: Newnham College, Cambridge; Leo Baeck College
- Neuberger's voice recorded 2012, as part of an audio description of the West London Synagogue for VocalEyes

Julia Babette Sarah Neuberger, Baroness Neuberger, DBE (née Schwab; born 27 February 1950) is a British rabbi and politician. She was the second woman to be ordained as a rabbi in the UK and the first to lead a synagogue.

Neuberger was made a life peer in 2004. In the House of Lords she took the Liberal Democrat whip until 2011 when she became a crossbencher upon becoming the full-time senior rabbi of the West London Synagogue, from which she retired in 2020. She became the chair of University College London Hospitals (UCLH) in 2019.

== Early life ==
Neuberger was born Julia Babette Sarah Schwab in the Hampstead area of London on 27 February 1950, the daughter of art critic Liesel ("Alice") and civil servant Walter Schwab. Her mother was a German-Jewish refugee who had fled the Nazis, arriving in England at the age of 22 in 1937, while her father was born in England to German-Jewish immigrants who had settled there before the First World War. The Schwab Trust, which supports and educates young refugees and asylum seekers, was later set up in her parents' name.

She attended South Hampstead High School and Newnham College, Cambridge, where she first studied Assyriology. After she was refused entry to Turkey because she was British, and then to Iraq because she was Jewish, she had to change her subject and instead studied her second language of Hebrew full-time. Her lecturer at the University of Cambridge, Nicholas de Lange, suggested she should become a rabbi. She obtained her rabbinic diploma at Leo Baeck College. She was the second woman to be ordained as a rabbi in the UK, the first being Jackie Tabick in 1975.

== Career ==
=== Religious roles ===
Neuberger taught at her alma mater, Leo Baeck College, from 1977 to 1997. She was rabbi of the South London Liberal Synagogue from 1977 to 1989 and was the first female rabbi to lead a synagogue in the United Kingdom. She was president of West Central Liberal Synagogue. On 1 February 2011, the West London Synagogue (a Movement for Reform Judaism synagogue) announced that she had been appointed as senior rabbi of the synagogue. She retired from her West London Synagogue role in March 2020. She regularly appeared on the Pause for Thought section on BBC Radio 2.

=== Public sector activity ===
Neuberger was chair of Camden and Islington Community Health Services NHS Trust from 1992 to 1997, and chief executive of the King's Fund from 1997 to 2004. She was also chancellor of the University of Ulster from 1994 to 2000. Who's Who lists a large number of voluntary and philanthropic roles she has undertaken. She became the chair of University College London Hospitals (UCLH) in 2019.

Her book, The Moral State We're In, a study of morality and public policy in modern Britain (ISBN 0-00-718167-1), was published in 2005. The title is an allusion to Will Hutton's 1997 book, The State We're In.

=== Political and parliamentary roles ===
Neuberger was the Social Democratic Party candidate for Tooting in the 1983 general election, coming third with 8,317 votes (18.1%). She was appointed a DBE in the 2004 New Year Honours for "services to the NHS and other Public Bodies". In June 2004, she was created a life peer as Baroness Neuberger, of Primrose Hill in the London Borough of Camden. She served as a Liberal Democrat Health spokesperson from 2004 to 2007. On 29 June 2007, Neuberger was appointed by the incoming Prime Minister Gordon Brown as the government's champion of volunteering. She resigned the Liberal Democrat whip in September 2011 upon becoming senior rabbi of the West London Synagogue.

== Controversy ==
In 1997, Neuberger criticised education in Northern Ireland as "sectarian" at the opening of Loughview Integrated Primary School. The Irish News claimed she had criticised Catholic schools as sectarian, leading to criticism from the Director of the Council for Catholic Maintained Schools. However, she said that the report from the Irish News had given a misleading impression and that she had been quoted out of context: "In fact, I think in what I actually said at the opening I didn't mention Catholic schools. I think I actually mentioned Protestant, Muslim and Jewish but then I was interviewed afterwards and I certainly said to the reporter that what I said applied just as much to Catholic schools as to Protestant or Jewish or Muslim or whatever."

== Charity work ==
In January 2013, Neuberger was appointed chair of an Independent Review of the Liverpool Care Pathway for the Dying Patient. The impartiality of the appointment was questioned by some of the bereaved families, due to her previous endorsement of the pathway, which was written by John Ellershaw, medical director of the Marie Curie Palliative Care Institute in Liverpool, in a 2003 BMJ article, and her widely publicised support of the Marie Curie Institute. The results of the review were published in July 2013; accepting the review's recommendations, the government advised that NHS hospitals should phase out the use of the LCP.

Neuberger was elected vice-president of Attend, a charity that supports and expands the roles volunteers play in creating healthy communities, in 2006 and held the position until she retired in 2011.

Neuberger was appointed to the board of Irish health insurers Vhi Healthcare for a five-year period from 2005 by Mary Harney, the Tánaiste and Minister for Health and Children.

Neuberger is a vice president of the Jewish Leadership Council.

== Personal life ==
Neuberger married Professor Anthony Neuberger on 17 September 1973. They have a son named Matthew and a daughter named Harriet. Her brother-in-law is Lord Neuberger, President of the Supreme Court.

In the wake of the Brexit vote in 2016, Neuberger stated that she would apply for a German passport, for which she is eligible through her parents. She said, "My decision has nothing at all to do with anti-Semitism, but with my origins, my admiration for how today's Germany has dealt with its past, and my sense of being European as well as British."

== Publications ==
- The Story of Judaism (for children), 1986, 2nd edition 1988.
- Days of Decision (Edited four in series), 1987.
- Caring for Dying Patients of Different Faiths, 1987, 3rd edition 2004 (edited, with John A. White).
- A Necessary End, 1991.
- Whatever's Happening to Women?, 1991.
- Ethics and Healthcare: the role of Research Ethics Committees in the UK, 1992.
- The Things That Matter (anthology of women's spiritual poetry, Edited by JN), 1993.
- On Being Jewish, 1995.
- Dying Well: a guide to enabling a better death, 1999, 2nd edition 2004.
- Hidden Assets: values and decision-making in the NHS today, (edition with Bill New), 2002.
- The Moral State We're In, 2005.
- Report on Volunteering, 2008.
- Antisemitism: What it is; What it isn't and why it matters, 2019.
