= West Central Liberal Synagogue =

- Location of the former synagogue in the London Borough of Camden

Religion
- Affiliation: Liberal Judaism (former)
- Ecclesiastical or organisational status: Synagogue (1954–2022)
- Status: Closed (2022)

Location
- Location: The Montagu Centre, 21 Maple Street, Bloomsbury, Borough of Camden, London W1T 4BE, England
- Country: United Kingdom
- Coordinates: "landmark_type:landmark 51°31′21″N 0°08′16″W

Architecture
- Type: Synagogue architecture
- Founder: Lily Montagu
- Established: 1928 (as a congregation)
- Completed: 1954

The logo of the former synagogue

West Central Liberal Synagogue was a Liberal Jewish community and synagogue, located in Bloomsbury in the Borough of Camden, London, England, in the United Kingdom.

The congregation was founded by Lily Montagu in 1928 (although it could trace its roots to services she held in the 1890s) and it had held services at The Montagu Centre since 1954.

The synagogue's last rabbi, until its closure in 2022, was Jackie Tabick.

== See also ==
- History of the Jews in England
- List of former synagogues in the United Kingdom
