= Accord Coalition =

The Accord Coalition for Inclusive Education is a campaign coalition of civil society groups and individuals which seeks to ensure all state funded schools in England and Wales are made open and suitable for all, regardless of staff, children or their family's religious or non-religious beliefs. Launched in 2008, the group campaigns for state funded schools to better facilitate religious mixing and the growth of mutual understanding between those of different beliefs, in the interests of equal opportunity, integration and cohesion in society.

Accord spokespersons regularly appear in the media to express the concerns of its members. The Coalition ran an annual award for over ten years to celebrate those schools that do most to promote mutual understanding and improve community cohesion. It also maintains a databank of information, which brings together and summarises research about the current policy implications of state funded faith schools and their practices. It released a report highlighting work it had undertaken in September 2018 to mark its 10th anniversary.

== Aims and objectives ==
Accord does not take a formal position on the principle of having state funded schools with a religious or philosophical ethos. Its five key campaign objectives are:

• To prevent discrimination on the basis of religion and belief in pupil admissions and in recruitment and employment of staff in faith schools

• To ensure that schools follow an objective and balanced syllabus for education about religious and non-religious beliefs to ensure that children grow up with an understanding of the main religion and belief traditions in society

• To replace the widely flouted laws that demand all state schools provide daily Collective Worship, with requirements to provide inclusive assemblies that focus on shared values

• That RE, Personal, Social, Health and Economic (PSHE) education and Citizenship are brought under a single inspection regime to help ensure they their provision is thorough, broad and balanced

• That Ofsted's inspection powers are revised so it again inspects schools on the extent to which they promote community cohesion

== Members and supporters ==
Accord was founded by a range of organisations including the Association of Teachers and Lecturers, Humanists UK, Ekklesia, the Hindu Academy and the Lesbian and Gay Christian Movement (renamed OneBodyOneFaith in June 2017). It also lists as member groups the race equality think tank The Runnymede Trust., British Muslims for Secular Democracy, and The General Assembly of Unitarian and Free Christian Churches.

At the end of 2021, the Chair of the Accord Coalition was the Reverend Stephen Terry, a former Church of England Parish Priest. Its founding Chair and current President is Rabbi Dr Jonathan Romain MBE, minister of Maidenhead Synagogue. Its individual supporters include academics, clergy, theologians and politicians from the four largest groupings in parliament. Accord co-founder, Jonathan Bartley, was elected joint leader of the Green Party of England and Wales in September 2016 and again in September 2018.
