= LJY-Netzer =

LJY-Netzer (ljy-נצ"ר – Liberal Jewish Youth-Netzer) is one of two British branches (snifim) of Netzer Olami, the International Progressive Reform Zionist Youth Movement. It is the youth movement affiliated to Liberal Judaism. All members of Liberal Jewish synagogues in the UK between the ages of 8 and 25 are automatically members of LJY-Netzer. It was formerly known as ULPJSNYC and then ULPSNYC-Netzer, the current name having been adopted in 2003.

It has a central ideology based upon the four concepts of Liberal Judaism (a theology developed by Claude Montefiore), Reform Zionism (also known as Progressive Zionism) Tikkun Olam (repairing the world) and as of Veidah 2014, Youth Empowerment. LJY-Netzer also affirms the Netzer Platform and The Affirmations of Liberal Judaism, the two ideologies of its parent bodies.

The movement is now run with a core number of Bogrim (graduates) forming the Mazkirut (Secretariat) and three to four office workers, including a Mazkir/a (General Secretary), Oved/et (worker) and Shaliach/Sh'licha (emissary from Israel), an administrator and in the near future a youth field and outreach worker. Key decisions are made at the annual Veidah, and Kinus is offered for younger members.

== History ==
In the 1940s, FLPJYG (Federation of Liberal and Progressive Jewish Youth Groups) was founded, and became ULPSNYC-Netzer (Union of Liberal and Progressive Synagogues Network of Youth Clubs). When the ULPS was rebranded as "Liberal Judaism", the youth movement became LJY-Netzer. Another considered name was Kadimah-Netzer (in line with the movement's flagship summer camp).

== Events ==
Today LJY-Netzer runs events throughout the year including Machaneh Kadimah (meaning "Camp Forward"; formerly Kadimah Summer Camp / School - changed due to LJY-Netzer taking on the running of the camp from the ULPS Youth Department), Machaneh Shamayim (Spring Camp - formerly Aviv), Veidah, Shabbatot, BOGtour Israel for those over 18, a month-long "Israel Tour" for 16-year-olds, Kayitz (a tour of Central and Eastern Europe) and Netivei Shnat-Netzer, an 8-month gap year in Israel, which can also involve youth work for Netzer branches in countries other than your own.

Kayitz (formerly Kayitz-Netzer) was run jointly with the other UK branch of Netzer, RSY-Netzer. It is now run by LJY-Netzer with RSY-Netzer and other Netzer participants attending. Kayitz lasts two weeks and focuses on issues of Diaspora Jewry, Zionism in relation to European history and the Shoah (Holocaust). Netivei Shnat Netzer, which is run by Netzer Olami launched in 2006 to replace the similar Shnat-Netzer programme. It is based in several places around Israel over 10 months. The aim of the course is to teach participants about and experience first-hand Israel and the Zionist ideals that helped to build it. It is split into three sets of netivim (paths). The first gives participants a choice between Etgar, a Jerusalem-based, Netzer-run leadership programme, and the Machon l'Madrichei Chul Jewish Agency programme. Both involve living in Jerusalem and daily lessons such as Judaism, Israeli history and culture and Hebrew. The second section provides a choice between living on a kibbutz (generally Kibbutz Yahel or Kibbutz Lotan) or Shnat B'ir ("Shnat in the city"), which involves living in a development town and volunteering. The final portion of the programme offers participants a choice of Kibbutz, Shnat B'ir and Shvil Yisrael, a hike along the length of Israel.

In 2010, LJY-Netzer became the first Jewish youth organisation to receive the YouthMark quality award.

== Shichvot (age groups) ==
- Ananim (Clouds): ages 8–9
- Plagim (Streams): ages 10–11
- Nechalim (Rivers): ages 12–13
- Yamim (Seas): ages 14–15
  - On Machaneh Kadimah, 15-year-olds camp, as opposed to sleeping in beds, and are on a different site to the rest of the camp. Their camp is known as Machaneh Chalutzim (Camp of the Pioneers), and the participants are known as Chalutzimniks.
- Galim (Waves): ages 16–18
- Bogrim (Graduates): ages 18-25
- Midbarim (Deserts): ages 26+
  - LJY-Netzer has an upper age limit of 25, and those who must leave the movement as a result are given the honorary title Midbar (Desert). Midbarim are not officially considered members and may not vote on Veidah, but are occasionally invited to help run events.
