= Jackie Tabick =

British Reform rabbi (born 1948)

Rabbi Jackie Tabick
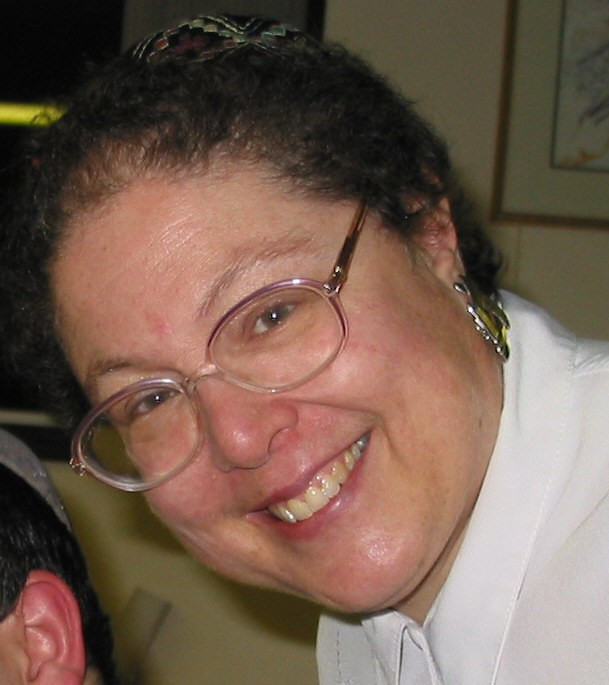
- Tabick in 2006 (or earlier)

Personal life
- Born: Jacqueline Acker; October 8, 1948 (age 77) Dublin, Ireland
- Spouse: Rabbi Larry Tabick (m. 1975)
- Children: Three

Religious life
- Religion: Judaism
- Denomination: Reform Judaism

Jewish leader
- Successor: Rabbi Jonathan Romain
- Position: Convenor of the Reform Movement Beit Din
- Organisation: Movement for Reform Judaism
- Began: 2012
- Ended: 2023
- Semikhah: Leo Baeck College in 1975

Jacqueline Hazel "Jackie" Tabick (née Acker; born 1948) is a British Reform rabbi. She became Britain's first female rabbi in 1975. She retired in 2023 as convenor of the Movement for Reform Judaism's Beit Din, the first woman in the role, and until its closure in 2022 was also Rabbi of West Central Liberal Synagogue in Bloomsbury, central London.

== Early life and training ==
Born in Dublin, Tabick spent most of her early life in England and grew up in the community of South West Essex & Settlement Reform Synagogue. After reading Medieval History for her degree at University College London, she enrolled at the Leo Baeck College where she completed her rabbinical training. She graduated to become Britain's first female rabbi in 1975.

== Rabbinical life ==
Starting as the assistant rabbi at West London Synagogue under Rabbi Hugo Gryn, she left in 1998 to become the rabbi of North West Surrey Synagogue. She held this position until July 2013, combining it with her role, since 2012, as the first female convenor of the Reform Movement's Beit Din. She has previously been the Movement's vice-president and is patron of the Jewish Council for Racial Equality (JCORE). She currently leads services at London's West Central Liberal Synagogue.

Tabick has played a leading role in interfaith initiatives. She is an executive of The Inter Faith Network. She was, for many years, chair of the World Congress of Faiths and is now co-president.

== Family life ==
She has been married to Rabbi Larry Tabick since 1975 and was the first female rabbi to marry a rabbi. Born in Brooklyn, New York in 1947, Larry came to England to study at the Leo Baeck College in the early 1970s and retired as rabbi of Shir Hayim in Hampstead in 2017. He and Jackie have three children, one of whom, Roni Tabick, is rabbi of the Masorti synagogue New Stoke Newington Shul in Stoke Newington, London.

== Other ==
The 2022 art exhibit "Holy Sparks", shown among other places at the Dr. Bernard Heller Museum, featured art about twenty-four female rabbis who were firsts in some way; Sandy Bleifer created the artwork about Tabick that was in that exhibit.
