= Prayer for the Day =

- Genre: Religious
- Running time: 2 mins (05.43)
- Country of origin: UK
- Language(s): English
- Home station: BBC Radio 4

Prayer for the Day is a religious radio programme broadcast on BBC Radio 4 in the United Kingdom. It comprises a 2-minute reading or prayer and reflection to start the day.

== Transmission ==
In 1983 the programme, which had always gone on air at 6.50am, was moved to 6.25am and replaced by a "Business News" slot. Since 1998 it has been broadcast each day between 5.43 and 5.45. a.m. before Farming Today.

== Contributors ==
Recent contributors have included George Pitcher, Shaunaka Rishi Das, George Craig, Rabbi Dr Naftali Brawer, Judy Merry, Canon Stephen Shipley and Canon Noel Battye.
