= Movement for Reform Judaism =

Jewish denomination in the UK

Movement for Reform Judaism - תנועת ליהדות רפורמית
- Abbreviation: MRJ
- Classification: Judaism
- Theology: Reform Judaism
- Chief Executive: Rabbi Josh Levy
- President: Sir Trevor Chinn
- Joint vice-chairs: Michael Harris; Paul Langsford
- Associations: World Union for Progressive Judaism
- Region: United Kingdom
- Headquarters: Sternberg Centre, London
- Origin: 4 January 1942; Midland Hotel, Manchester
- Merged into: Progressive Judaism (United Kingdom)
- Defunct: 2025
- Congregations: 42
- Members: 16,125 households
- Official website: reformjudaism.org.uk

The Movement for Reform Judaism (MRJ), known as Reform Synagogues of Great Britain until 2005, was one of the two World Union for Progressive Judaism-affiliated denominations in the United Kingdom. In 2025, a vote confirmed that the Movement for Reform Judaism would unite with Liberal Judaism into one Progressive Judaism for the UK and Ireland.

It was originally larger and considered to be more traditional in comparison with Liberal Judaism, however differences between the two evaporated in the 21st century with Reform – previously seen as the more traditional – modernising, and Liberal Judaism re-adopting some discarded traditions. Both denominations came to very similar positions on principle and practice, "seeking to marry the traditions of the past with the realities of the present".

It was the second-largest Jewish religious group in the United Kingdom, with 19.4% of synagogue-member households. The new movement, Progressive Judaism, represents about 30 per cent of British Jewry who are affiliated to synagogues.

== Belief and practice ==
The denomination shared the basic tenets of Reform Judaism (alternatively known also as Progressive or Liberal) worldwide: a theistic, personal God; an ongoing revelation, under the influence of which all scripture was written—but not dictated by providence—that enables contemporary Jews to reach new religious insights without necessarily being committed to the conventions of the past; regarding the ethical and moral values of Judaism as its true essence, while ritual and practical observance are meant to achieve spiritual elation and not an end to themselves – and therefore, rejecting the binding nature of Jewish law; a belief in the coming of a Messianic era rather than a personal Messiah, and in immortality of the soul only, instead of bodily resurrection. Prayers referring to such concepts were omitted from the liturgy, and traditional practices were abolished or altered considerably.

Although Reform Judaism in the UK subscribed to these views, also held by Liberal Judaism and the American Union for Reform Judaism, several factors made it more moderate and less prone to modify old forms. Its constituency was socially conservative, and it attempted to appeal to potential newcomers from the Centrist Orthodox majority in British Jewry; renewed traditionalism by all WUPJ members since the 1970s also motivated Reform Judaism in the UK to adopt once discarded elements. Though it does not consider itself halakhic, it has sometimes been compared to American Conservative Judaism—the sociological functions of which, as an "intermediate" movement, it indeed filled, especially since the British expression of Conservative Judaism, the Masorti movement, was formally established only in 1985 and remains small—while Liberals are more reminiscent of American Reform.

Reform liturgy had always contained a high proportion of Hebrew or Aramaic, while the Liberals and American Reform abridged theirs and introduced much English. Since the 1970s, formerly excised blessings (like those on phylacteries) were returned. Reform Judaism in the UK observes dietary laws and Shabbat to a considerable degree in the public sphere. It has a get-like divorce document issued by its rabbinic court, and conversion requires circumcision by males and ablution by both sexes. Egalitarianism did not become prevalent in most synagogues until the 2000s, although the first female rabbi, Jackie Tabick, was ordained in 1975. Mixed seating was only accepted just before and during World War II.

Recognition of Jews by patrilineal descent was affirmed in 2015. Reform Judaism ordained female and LGBT clergy, conducted LGBT marriages and had egalitarian services, counting women in minyanim and granting them full participation. Girls have their bat mitzvah at 13, the same age as boys have their bar mitzvah. Reform Judaism was welcoming to non-Jewish spouses; while the Assembly maintains "clear opposition" to involvement in interfaith unions, since 2012 it allowed rabbis to conduct celebratory events as long as the ceremony does not involve clergy or motifs from other religions, or conversely those of a Jewish wedding, like a ritual canopy. All these practices have continued under the merger into Progressive Judaism.

== Organisational structure ==
As of 2025, Reform Judaism had 42 synagogues, of which 40 are located in England, and, among those, 12 in Greater London. There was one congregation in Cardiff and one in Glasgow. As of 2010, Reform Judaism had 16,125 member households, accounting for 19.4% of synagogue-affiliated Jewish families in Britain and roughly 14% of the total Jewish population.

All of the synagogues were autonomous, owned and financed by their members who also hired their own local rabbi independently. All clergy were members of the Assembly of Reform Rabbis and Cantors, which publishes Reform prayerbooks and determines policy in religious matters. The denomination was led by the Movement CEO, while the Chair of the Assembly represented and organised the rabbis. It maintained a rabbinical court (Beth Din), located at the Sternberg Centre in London. The Reform Bet Din's decisions were recognised worldwide by all WUPJ affiliates. Alongside the clergy, lay leadership was provided by a board of delegates.

Through its work for the welfare and development of young people, Reform Judaism was a member of the National Council for Voluntary Youth Services (NCVYS). It trained its clergy at the Leo Baeck College, London, which it shared with Liberal Judaism. While British Reform Judaism and British Liberal Judaism were both WUPJ affiliates and cooperate in many fields, such as outreach to the religiously non-active and interfaith families, the two organisations had previously stressed that they "retain their autonomy and distinct identities". However, on 17 April 2023, in announcing that Rabbi Josh Levy would take up the post of its chief executive from 1 May 2023, the Movement for Reform Judaism said that Rabbi Levy would work in partnership with Rabbi Charley Baginsky, chief executive of Liberal Judaism, on the creation of a unified movement in the United Kingdom for Progressive Judaism.

Prior to Levy taking office, MRJ's board was led by the joint Vice-Chairs, Michael Harris and Paul Langsford. Rabbis Kathleen Middleton and James Baaden co-chaired the Assembly of Reform Rabbis and Cantors. Rabbi Jackie Tabick was Convenor of the Reform Bet Din until 2023. She was succeeded by Rabbi Jonathan Romain. Sir Trevor Chinn was President.

== History ==
In the 1820s and 1830s, a small intellectual current arose in English Jewry, influenced by the Anglican environment which laid great emphasis on the Bible alone and scorned the Jews for valuing the Talmud. Represented by such figures as Isaac D'Israeli, they were sometimes named "neo-Karaites", though their actual knowledge of Karaism was scant. This group rejected rabbinic authority and espoused a bibliocentric view.

Concurrently, wealthy members of the Sephardi Mocatta and Ashkenazi Goldsmid families, who were related by marriage, were complaining about lack of decorum and rigid regulations in the Bevis Marks and Great Synagogue of London, respectively. The Mocattas were forced to walk miles on the Sabbath as an old communal ordinance banned forming prayer groups in a radius of ten miles from Bevis; Isaac Goldsmid vied for more clout with the wardens, and repeatedly protested against the protracted blessings for family members during services. They were also inclined to worship together. Eventually, a group of Mocattas, Goldsmids, Montefiores and other supporters withdrew from their two congregations on 15 April 1840, declaring their intention to found a house of worship for neither Sephardi nor Ashkenazi, but "British Jews". They appointed David Woolf Marks to lead services in their new West London Synagogue, dedicated on 27 January 1842. A former reader in Liverpool, he was deeply influenced by the "neo-Karaite" tendency and refused to cantillate the Torah on the second day of festivals, grounded only in rabbinic tradition. His stance suited the secessionists mainly on the practical level; Most never cared much for the bibliocentric issue but were content to abolish the second day.

Although the term "Reform" was occasionally conferred on the congregation, Todd Endelman stressed that they were "unique and owed nothing" to the continental movement. Jakob Josef Petuchowski emphasised that Marks' philosophy was the polar opposite to that espoused by the German founding fathers of Reform Judaism. The latter regarded the Beatified Sages as geniuses and progressives who developed Rabbinic Law further. Marks granted the Written Torah alone divine status, refused to call himself rabbi but insisted on "reverend", and even translated the Kaddish into Hebrew, viewing Aramaic prayer as a later rabbinic corruption. In his new prayerbook and Passover Haggadah, he excised or reinstated various elements, always contrary to rabbinic tradition. Petitions for the Return to Zion under the Messiah and reinstitution of sacrifices, rejected by Continental Reform, did not concern the English at all. West London was subject to a harsh denunciation and de facto ex-communication by Chief Rabbi Solomon Hirschell in 1842.

In 1856, tensions in Manchester were increasing, as many in the community sought greater autonomy from the authoritarian new Chief Rabbi Nathan Marcus Adler and regarded local Rabbi Solomon Marcus Schiller-Szinessy with disfavour. On 25 March 1858 the dissident Manchester Congregation of British Jews was dedicated. They adopted Marks' prayerbook but retained the second day of festivals. Their motives were far more political than principally religious. In 1872, a third English synagogue withdrew from Adler's jurisdiction, the Bradford Jewish Association. Unlike the rest, Bradford was clearly influenced by developments in Continental Europe: the founders were mostly German Jews, as was their first rabbi, Joseph Strauss. The three breakaway congregations were neither organised together nor had a consistent religious philosophy. Marks' "neo-Karaism", which was never very important to ordinary constituents in West London, virtually died with him. His successor, Rabbi Morris Joseph, was dismissed by the Orthodox in 1890 for evincing doubt about the prayers concerning the sacrifices but was of little conviction. His moderate style brought a rapprochement with the United Synagogue.

At the turn of the century, Claude Montefiore emerged as the most important religious philosopher among Anglo-Jewry. Montefiore, whose mother attended West London Synagogue, studied at the Berlin Hochschule für die Wissenschaft des Judentums and was a disciple of the teachings of German Reformers Abraham Geiger and Samuel Holdheim. His Jewish Religious Union (JRU), the antecedent of British Liberal Judaism, was as purist and radical as American Reform Judaism, if not exceeding it. He too emphasised the ethical aspects as the essence of religion, instituted drastic ritual reforms – over half of the Liberal liturgy was in English, men were bareheaded and sat together with women, the practical observance was not only ignored by the public (as was the case in the United Synagogue, too) but officially discarded. While the three nonconformist synagogues did not emulate the JRU, it did influence them toward greater modifications, albeit yet inconsistent. In 1919, the St. George synagogue, appealing for unaffiliated East End Jews, was opened by Basil Henriques. It was alternatively sponsored by both West London and the Liberals.

The first of the three breakaway synagogues to adopt full-fledged Reform Judaism was West London. After the retirement of Rabbi Joseph in 1929, it hired Harold F Reinhart, a Hebrew Union College graduate who served as a rabbi in several congregations of the Union of American Hebrew Congregations. Within a year, Reinhart brought the synagogue into the recently established World Union for Progressive Judaism (WUPJ), albeit retaining a relatively conservative ritual, consistent with the congregation's sensibilities. Though both were WUPJ affiliates, cooperation and competition alike characterised relations with the Liberal ULPS as a growing interest in non-Orthodox forms emerged among the wider public. A Glasgow printer named Samuel Ginsberg was impressed with what he saw in West London and opened the Glasgow Progressive Synagogue in 1932. In 1933, Reinhart sponsored the establishment of the North Western Reform Synagogue at Golders Green. In 1935, a group at Edgware seceded from the United Synagogue and formed the Edgware & District Reform Synagogue, again under West London's guidance.

A movement only arose with the arrival of some 40,000 Jewish refugees from Nazi Germany. While worldwide Reform Judaism originated there, the nature of German communities limited what was known as "Liberal Judaism" to the status of a tendency within unified congregations which had to accommodate traditionalist members. German Liberals were relatively conservative (for example, maintaining mainly-Hebrew liturgy, head coverings for men, and separate seating for men and for women), and found the British Liberal synagogues far too radical. The moderation of the independent nonconformist ones suited them better, and immigrants overwhelmed West London and the others. They also brought along a cadre of 35 Hochschule-trained rabbis, most prominently Ignaz Maybaum and Werner van der Zyl who were aided by Reinhart in finding new posts at Britain. Harmonising ritual and religious approach to a great measure, they made their loosely related communities quite uniform. One that remained independent and strongly clung to German Liberal worship was Belsize Square Synagogue.

On 4 January 1942, representatives from the West London, North Western, St. George Settlement, Glasgow, Manchester and Bradford synagogues met at the Midland Hotel, Manchester and founded the Associated British Synagogues, later renamed Associated Synagogues of Great Britain. The ASGB joined the WUPJ as a whole in 1945. In 1956, it cooperated with the ULPS to establish the Leo Baeck College for training rabbis. In 1958, it adopted the name Reform Synagogues of Great Britain, which lasted until 2005.

=== Merger with Liberal Judaism ===
On 17 April 2023, Reform Judaism and the Liberal movement announced their intention to merge and form a single progressive Jewish movement. This had previously been tried, and failed, in 1903, 1942 and 1983. The merger was approved by both movements on 18 May 2025, at two parallel Extraordinary General Meetings (EGMs) of member communities, with the number of votes in favour at each exceeding 95 per cent. By the end of 2025, the Reform and Liberal movements completed the merger into Progressive Judaism.

== Notable Reform rabbis ==
=== Living people ===
- Rabbi Tony Bayfield (born 1946), head of the Movement for Reform Judaism from 1994 (when the organisation was known as Reform Synagogues of Great Britain) until 2011, and former President of the Movement for Reform Judaism (2011–16)
- Rabbi Mark Goldsmith (born 1963), Senior Rabbi at Edgware & Hendon Reform Synagogue since 2019
- Rabbi Laura Janner-Klausner (born 1963), broadcaster and former Senior Rabbi to the Movement for Reform Judaism (2011–20); Rabbi at Bromley Reform Synagogue since 2022
- Rabbi Josh Levy, Chief Executive of the Movement of Reform Judaism since May 2023 and Co-Lead of Progressive Judaism
- Rabbi Professor Jonathan Magonet (born 1942), who was the first full-time principal of Leo Baeck College (1985–2005)
- Rabbi Julia Neuberger, Baroness Neuberger (born 1950), former Senior Rabbi at West London Synagogue and the second woman to be ordained as a rabbi in the UK
- Rabbi Dr Jonathan Romain (born 1954), writer, broadcaster, former minister of Maidenhead Synagogue and, since 2023, convenor of the Movement for Reform Judaism's Beit Din
- Rabbi Sybil Sheridan (born 1953), Chair of the Assembly of Reform Rabbis UK (2013–15); Rabbi at Newcastle Reform Synagogue and previously Rabbi at West London Synagogue
- Rabbi Jackie Tabick (born 1948), Britain's first female rabbi in 1975, and convenor of the Movement for Reform Judaism's Beit Din (2012–2023), the first woman in the role

=== Historical figures ===
- Rabbi Lionel Blue (1930–2016), broadcaster and former European Director of the World Union for Progressive Judaism
- Rabbi Hugo Gryn (1928–1996), broadcaster and Senior Rabbi at West London Synagogue
- Rabbi Werner van der Zyl (1902–1984), Senior Rabbi at West London Synagogue, a founder and President of Leo Baeck College, London; President of the Reform Synagogues of Great Britain and Life Vice President of the World Union for Progressive Judaism

== Bibliography ==
- Kershen, Anne J.; Romain, Jonathan A. Tradition and change: a history of Reform Judaism in Britain, 1840–1995. London; Portland, Oregon: Vallentine Mitchell, 1995. ISBN 0-85303-316-1; ISBN 0-85303-298-X.
- De Lange, Elaine. Women in Reform Judaism (Judaism in our time series). London: Reform Synagogues of Great Britain, 1975.
