= Glasgow Reform Synagogue =

Synagogue in Newton Mearns, East Renfrewshire, Scotland

- Location of the synagogue in Scotland

Religion
- Affiliation: Reform Judaism
- Ecclesiastical or organizational status: Synagogue
- Leadership: Rabbi Pete Tobias
- Status: Active

Location
- Location: 147 Ayr Road, Newton Mearns, East Renfrewshire, Scotland G77 6RE
- Country: United Kingdom
- Interactive map of Glasgow Reform Synagogue
- Coordinates: 55°46′24″N 4°19′48″W

Architecture
- Founder: Samuel Ginsburg
- Established: 1933 (as a congregation)
- Completed: 1968

Website
- www.grs.org.uk

Glasgow Reform Synagogue (Hebrew: אוֹר חָדָשׁ) is a Reform Jewish synagogue, located in Newton Mearns, East Renfrewshire, Scotland, in the United Kingdom. The congregation is a member of the Movement for Reform Judaism and is the only Reform synagogue in Scotland. The synagogue was first known as Glasgow Progressive Synagogue, then Glasgow New Synagogue, before taking its current name.

== History ==
The synagogue was founded in 1933 and moved to its present premises in 1968. Previous locations include at 39 Queen Street, Strathbungo, from about 1935 until late 1930s; at 90 Albert Road, Pollokshields Street, from late 1930s until about 1948; at Langside Halls, from about 1948 to 1950; and at 306 Albert Drive, Pollokshields Street, from 1950 to 1968.

Nancy Morris, the first female rabbi in Scotland, was the synagogue's rabbi from 2003 to 2011, followed by Dr Kate Briggs (2014–2016). The current rabbi, since 2021, is Pete Tobias.

== See also ==
- List of Jewish communities in the United Kingdom
- History of the Jews in Scotland
