= Kesslers International Group =

British point-of-purchase designer and manufacturer

- Company type: Private company
- Industry: Shop fitting
- Founded: 1928; 98 years ago
- Founder: Bernhard Kessler and his son Leopold Kessler
- Headquarters: London, United Kingdom
- Area served: Worldwide
- Key people: Daniel Astarita (managing director)
- Products: Point-of-sale design, manufacture, and installation
- Number of employees: 95 (2023)
- Website: www.kesslers.com

Kesslers International is a British point-of-sale designer, manufacturer, and installer, based in London, UK. The offices and the plant are situated in Highams Park Industrial estate in North East London.

== History ==
In 1888, Viennese wood-worker Bernhard Kessler opened a workshop that succeeded to the point that he expanded to London in 1928, opening Bernhard Kessler & Sons, to be managed by his son Leopold. Leopold Kessler worked with a local firm on developing and manufacturing mine detectors.

After World War II, Kesslers was commissioned by Parker Pen Company and Dunlop Tyres to begin producing retail display stands. This became a dominant business focus for them. In the mid-1970s, they took the name Kesslers International.

In 2015, Kesslers International Group was still a family-run business with William Kessler, Bernhard's grandson, as the group's chairman, and his sons, Charles and George, overseeing Kesslers International in its Stratford, East London headquarters.

In 2017, the company was acquired by private equity fund Elaghmore and was merged with two other companies to create the Hexcite Group. In December 2021, Kesslers was put into administration by the Hexcite group. The group had failed in its strategy to diversify and grow the business through an outsourced supply model. When the COVID-19 pandemic hit, it was no longer possible to return the business to profitability and the company was put into administration. In December, 125 employees were made redundant and the assets were sold to PFI Group.

Under PFI group the remaining 95 employees were relocated from Stratford, East London to Highams Park Industrial Estate. However, the PFI Group experienced a turbulent financial period. As a result, Kessler was separated from the group and still made a profit in 2022. In November 2023, the company was sold in a management buyout headed by managing director Daniel Astarita and operations director Rachael Evans, and became an independent company once more.

== Products ==
The company provides bespoke point-of-sale retail display stands, including design, technical engineering, manufacturing, installation and post-campaign customer service.

== Recognition ==
Kesslers International is a member of POPAI (Point-of-Purchase Advertising International), and in 2010 won the group's bronze award for bespoke multimedia displays provided to Take One Media.
