= Charley Baginsky =

British executive, rabbi and Jewish organisational leader

Rabbi Charley Baginsky
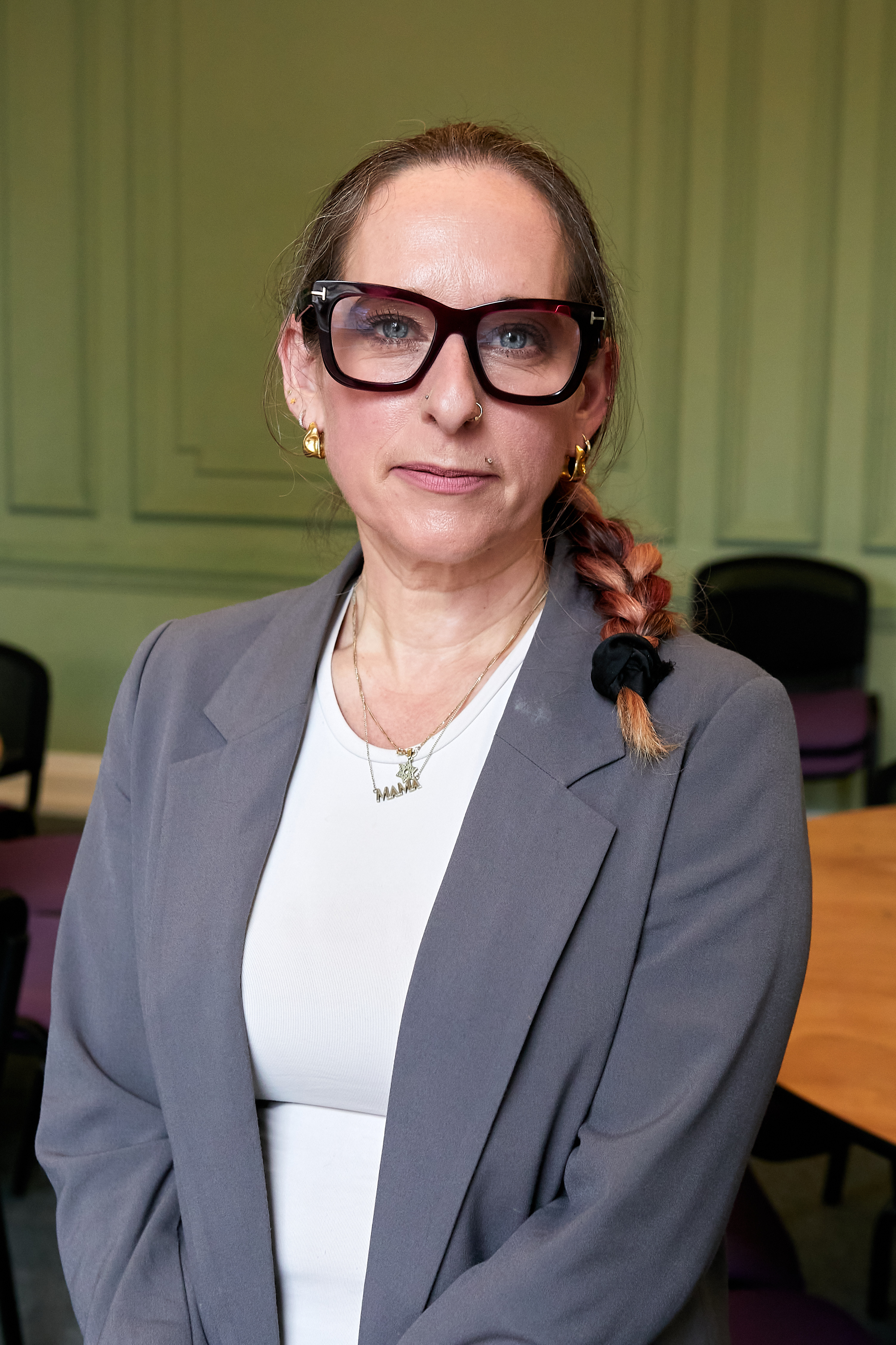
- Baginsky in 2026

Personal life
- Born: Charlotte Hannah Baginsky; 25 December 1978 (age 47) England
- Children: 3

Religious life
- Religion: Judaism

Jewish leader
- Position: Rabbi
- Organisation: Progressive Judaism

Rabbi Charley Baginsky (born 25 December 1978) is a British Progressive rabbi and Co-Lead of Progressive Judaism in the UK and Ireland.

== Early life and education ==
Charlotte 'Charley' Baginsky was born in England, the daughter of William Baginsky and Mary Baginsky (née Yates). She gained a degree in Theology from Christ's College, Cambridge, and later studied at King's College London, before working and studying for several years in Israel.

Her work in Israel ranged from a period at Leo Baeck, Haifa to being the manager of Mike's Place in Jerusalem, where the 'Charley' cocktail is still named after her.

== Rabbinic career ==
Rabbi Baginsky was inspired to enter the rabbinate by her experiences in Israel, saying: "I spent three years in Israel, with Judaism as part of my everyday. Back in the UK, I wanted to make Judaism part of my everyday here, too."

She entered the rabbinic programme at Leo Baeck College in 2003 and was ordained in 2008. Her rabbinic thesis was titled "Penned and Penned: The Language and Imagery of Land and Identity in the Construction of 'Woman' in Tractate Yevemot". It was primarily concerned with the construction of gender, and the role of women in the Bavli (Babylon Talmud), as part of a hermeneutical exercise.

In 2008, she was appointed as Rabbi of Kingston Liberal Synagogue, a position she held for ten years. She had previously served the community as a student rabbi. During this period, she also served as Chair of the Conference of Liberal Rabbis and Cantors, and Chair of the organising committee for Liberal Judaism's national events.

On leaving Kingston Liberal Synagogue, Rabbi Baginsky served a number of roles in the national Liberal Judaism movement including, from 2016 to 2020, as Liberal Judaism's Director of Strategy and Partnerships. She was also (part-time) the Rabbi for South Bucks Jewish Community from 2016 to 2020. From March to December 2020 Baginsky was, with Shelley Shocolinsky-Dwyer, Liberal Judaism's joint interim Director. In January 2021, she was appointed as the Chief Executive Officer of Liberal Judaism (UK).

In 2023, alongside Rabbi Josh Levy – Chief Executive of The Movement for Reform Judaism –- and the two movements’ respective chairs, she spearheaded the project to unite Reform and Liberal Judaism into one Progressive Judaism for the UK and Ireland. Rabbis Baginsky and Levy then spent two years touring the country to speak to members of every Progressive community – either in person or online – about the union. In May 2025, the decision to merge was officially made at two parallel Extraordinary General Meetings (EGMs) of member communities, with the number of votes in favour at each exceeding 95%. On the day of the result, Rabbi Baginsky said: "Through this vote, our members are both standing on the shoulders of all those who came before us and creating something long and lasting for the generations who come after us."

Rabbi Baginsky also currently serves in a number of voluntary roles including as a Trustee of Leo Baeck College, a school governor and President of the Council of Christian and Jews.

She was a signatory to The Drumlanrig Accords, also known as the Muslim-Jewish Reconciliation Accords – the landmark agreement between 12 Muslim and Jewish senior faith leaders presented to King Charles III at Buckingham Palace.

She is a regular contributor to BBC Radio’s Pause for Thought, Thought for the Day and Prayer for the Day.

== Advocacy and views ==
=== Women in faith leadership ===
Rabbi Baginsky has spoken about the ongoing challenges faced by women in religious authority, especially outside Progressive Judaism.

In a 2024 interview with the Church Times, she said: "Our community is very used to women rabbis but as soon as I step out, whether that is in interfaith settings or in other parts of the Jewish community, often I’m the only woman with seniority in that space. There is a need to prove oneself, whereas if I was a man I would automatically walk in with authority."

In sermons and interfaith settings, she links women’s leadership to spiritual inclusivity, including giving the King’s College Chapel address in 2025 where she said: "We must amplify the voices through which God might still be heard. This is how we find beauty in uncertainty and invite joy amid fragmentation: by widening the frame of who tells the story."

In 2021, she became the first woman to light the Trafalgar Square Chanukah candles– accompanied by London Mayor Sadiq Khan.

=== Faith literacy in schools ===
Rabbi Baginsky has argued that religious understanding should be part of public and civic education, not confined to faith communities. She has described faith literacy as a tool for empathy, urging schools to teach about lived religion rather than abstract belief. Her advocacy emphasises dialogue between teachers, pupils, and communities as a foundation for social cohesion.

=== Supporting refugees ===
Rabbi Baginsky connects refugee support to Jewish historical experience, memory and moral tradition. In a BBC interview she said: "Many of us, in the Jewish community, who come from refugee backgrounds and appreciate what we have received from this country, give back a hundredfold."

Under her leadership, Liberal Judaism and then Progressive Judaism has partnered with synagogues offering housing, legal aid, and education for refugees.

Rabbi Baginsky has also been an advocate for The Association of Jewish Refugees (AJR)'s next generations programming, highlighting her own family's history as refugees and appearing alongside her father in public interviews.

=== Progressive Zionism ===
Rabbi Baginsky’s vision of Zionism is rooted in justice, pluralism and democratic responsibility. She has argued for "a new model of Zionist relationship founded in mutuality," calling on diaspora Jews to love Israel "with both passion and principle." In a 2025 joint letter with her Progressive Judaism Co-Lead Rabbi Josh Levy, she wrote: "We must teach, write, speak and act. We must insist that our Judaism, and our Zionism, demand compassion, justice and courage."

=== Diversity of voice ===
Rabbi Baginsky and Rabbi Levy, as Co-Leads of Progressive Judaism, have written a number of articles on the importance of diversity of voice within Judaism and how pluralism is not a weakness, but a strength of Progressive Judaism.

On the specific topic of Israel, she told the Jewish News: "We are constantly in a moment of feeling internally conflicted. Our job as a movement, as Progressive Judaism, is to be able to help communities to be able to hold that and to be able to say that actually it is complex. It is OK to feel two things or to talk about two truths at the same time."

== Family life ==
Baginsky has three children.

== Publications ==
=== Books ===
- Co-Editor of Progressive Judaism, Zionism and the State of Israel, edited by Dr Ed Kessler, Charley Baginsky and Josh Levy (2026), ISBN 9798253536209
- Contributor to The Fragile Dialogue: New Voices of Liberal Zionism, edited by Stanley M Davids and Rabbi Lawrence A Englander Dhl (2017), ISBN 9780881233056
- Contributor to Women Rabbis in the Pulpit: A Collection of Sermons, edited by Rabbi Dr Barbara Borts and Rabbi Elli Tikvah Sarah (2015), ISBN 9780988053939

=== Newspaper articles ===
- Contributions to The Jewish Chronicle
- Contributions to Jewish News
- Contributions to Telem
