= Josh Levy =

Co-Lead of Progressive Judaism

Rabbi Josh Levy
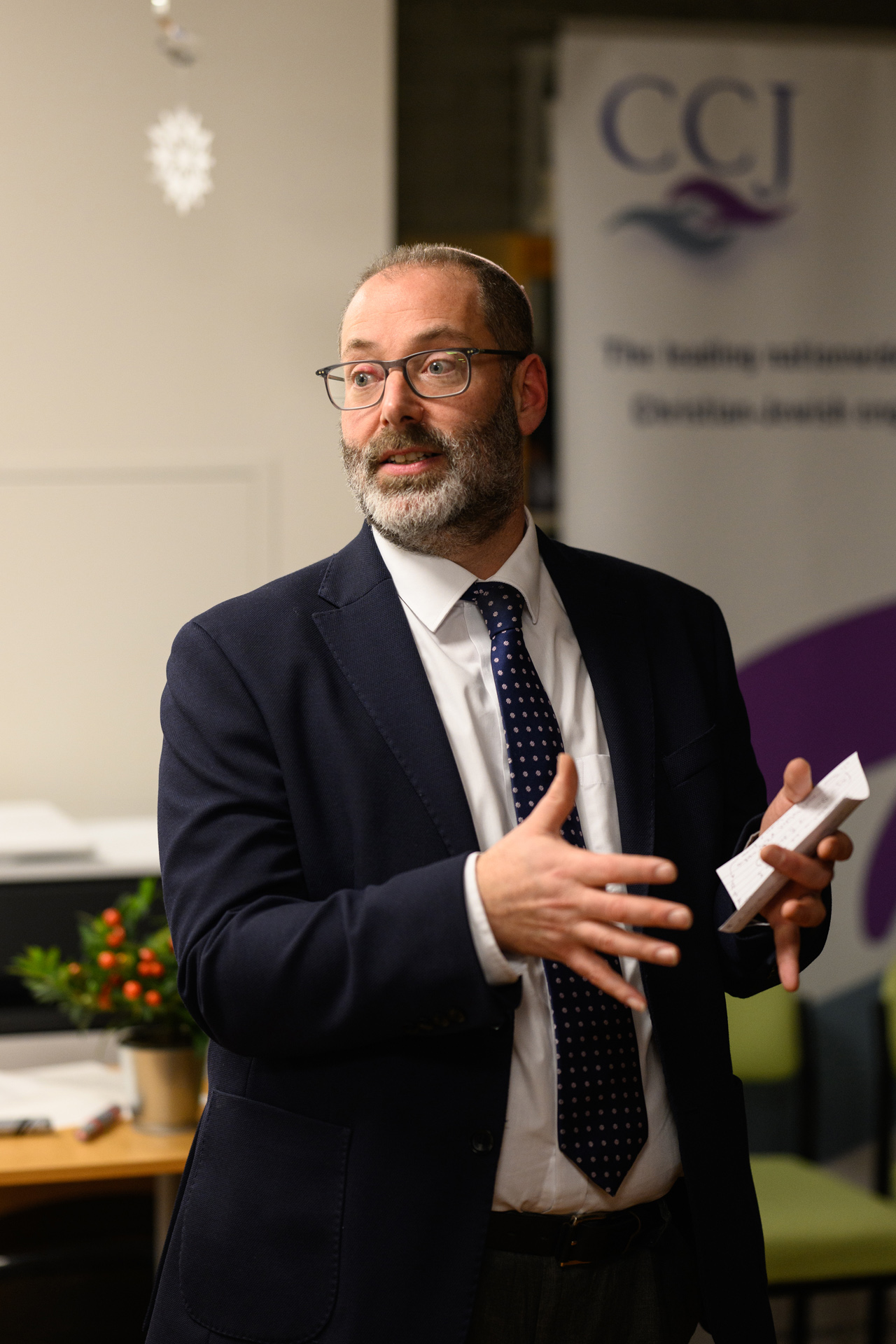

Personal life
- Born: Josh Levy; March 1974 (age 52) Manchester, England

Religious life
- Religion: Judaism
- Denomination: Progressive

Jewish leader
- Synagogue: Alyth
- Organisation: Progressive Judaism UK

Rabbi Josh Levy (born March 1974) is a British Progressive rabbi and Co-Lead of Progressive Judaism in the UK and Ireland.

He is also Rabbi Emeritus of Alyth (North Western Reform Synagogue) in Temple Fortune, northwest London, where he previously served as Rabbi and Principal Rabbi for 15 years.

== Life and career ==
=== Early life and education ===
Rabbi Levy was raised in Manchester and attended Manchester Grammar School.

He has been involved with Progressive Judaism since childhood, having grown up as a member of Menorah Synagogue (Cheshire Reform Congregation) and in the youth movement RSY-Netzer.

His paternal grandfather, Rev Dr Isaac Levy, was Senior Jewish Chaplain to the British Armed Forces. Rev Levy was among the British troops that were stationed close to Bergen-Belsen, a nazi concentration camp, when it was liberated.

Rabbi Levy received a BA degree in Politics, Philosophy and Economics from Oxford University, and a masters in Social Policy and Planning from the London School of Economics.

=== Career ===
Rabbi Levy’s career in the Jewish community began when he became Finchley Reform Synagogue’s education director in 1999.

While taking the job at first in order to “pay the rent”, he soon realised he had “a passion for Jewish life and tradition”.

He entered the Rabbinic Programme at Leo Baeck College in 2002, receiving ordination in 2007. His rabbinic thesis was on Tractate Gerim of the Babylonian Talmud, which deals with laws of converts and conversion.

His first rabbinic role was as Assistant Rabbi (Education) at West London Synagogue from 2004-2008.

At Alyth he led a transformation of prayer life, including the introduction of new styles of service. He developed innovative, engaging and musical tefillah (prayer services). During this period, he served as Chair of the Assembly of Reform Rabbis and Cantors, and as Chair of the Standing Committee of the Reform Beit Din.

In 2023, he was appointed as Chief Executive of The Movement for Reform Judaism. Alongside Rabbi Charley Baginsky – CEO of Liberal Judaism – and the two movements’ respective chairs, he spearheaded the project to unite Reform and Liberal Judaism into one Progressive Judaism for the UK and Ireland.

Writing a joint op-ed in the Jewish News in 2023, Rabbis Levy and Baginsky said: “This is an idea whose time has come. Both movements feel like truly equal partners and we can finally put in place the move that people have talked about for decades. Led by our Boards and our rabbinates, this isn’t a merger or a takeover but the formation of a brand-new movement, Progressive Judaism.”

Rabbis Levy and Baginsky then spent two years touring the country to speak to members of every Progressive community – either in person or online – about the union. He said: “We want members of our communities to feel a part of the conversation and the changing face of Judaism.”

In May 2025, the decision to merge was officially made at two parallel Extraordinary General Meetings (EGMs) of member communities, with the number of votes in favour at each exceeding 95%.

On the day of the result, Rabbi Levy said: "We have heard first-hand how Progressive Jews all around the country want to take this once-in-a-generation opportunity to create something new and intentional – a Progressive Judaism that has something to say into the world and that can help more people have more fulfilling religious lives."

As well as his role as Co-Lead of Progressive Judaism, Rabbi Levy is a lecturer in Progressive Rabbinic Decision Making at Leo Baeck College.

== Advocacy and views ==
=== Progressive Judaism and Halakhah ===
Rabbi Levy is an expert in the Progressive Jewish relationship with Halakhah (Jewish Law) and teaches it at Leo Baeck College.

He argues Progressive Judaism, in both its main forms in the UK, has always been deeply connected with the full breadth of Judaism’s textual inheritance while, at the same time, recognising the limitation of a system of religious law in the post enlightenment age.

He has spoken on how Progressive Judaism stresses the primacy of Jewish values in decision making.

=== Interfaith relations ===
Rabbi Levy is a leading voice on British interfaith relations. He was a signatory to The Drumlanrig Accords, also known as the Muslim-Jewish Reconciliation Accords. This landmark agreement between 12 Muslim and Jewish senior faith leaders from across the UK was presented to King Charles III at Buckingham Palace.

He played a key role in the annual Alyth Iftar – which brings together Jews, Muslims and Christians to break the Ramadan fast – and regularly takes part in interfaith activities on Mitzvah Day.

He took a prominent role in the campaign to support the proposed Islamic Centre in Golders Green.

Rabbi Levy is a president of the Council of Christians and Jews and regularly speaks at their events.

=== Jewish status ===
As Chair of the Standing Committee of the Reform Beit Din, Rabbi Levy led the working group looking at issues of inherited status, which changed the way that Reform Judaism in the UK welcomed people with both Jewish and non-Jewish lineage.

This work led to Reform Judaism adopting the practice that Jewish status can be inherited from either parent (no matter the gender of the Jewish parent), where a child is brought up as Jewish.

At the time, Rabbi Levy wrote: “These proposals put learning and commitment to Jewish life at the heart of these status decisions. They are robust, thoughtful and authentic, grounded in enduring Jewish values.”

This approach to Jewish status was already the case within Liberal Judaism and is therefore also the practice of the new Progressive Judaism.

=== Welcome of mixed faith families ===
Along with his colleagues in the Progressive clergy, Rabbi Levy has been instrumental in the welcome of mixed faith/dual heritage couples and families within Progressive Judaism.

He cites evidence that at least one in three Jews are choosing to marry a non-Jew and argues that “this new demographic reality that makes a demand of us: to make it possible for more people to live meaningful Jewish lives.”

He has written: “If a third of Jews now marry non-Jews, we have an urgent and sacred task: to ensure that our communities honour the choice that they have made and welcome them in. Progressive Judaism is committed to responding to this task.”

=== Diversity of voice ===
Rabbi Levy and Rabbi Baginsky, as Co-Leads of Progressive Judaism, have written a number of articles on the importance of diversity of voice within Judaism.

Rabbi Levy said: “In the past, a light hasn’t always been shone on the extraordinary diversity of the Jewish community in the UK. What is important is that people can see themselves in the Jewish institutions of this country, and that their voices are amplified."

On the specific topic of Israel, he told The Guardian: “One of the things that is distinctive about us is that we think we are stronger for being willing to speak about how difficult this is. We are open to a diversity of voices.”

=== Organ donation ===
Rabbi Levy advocates for Jews to register as organ donors.

He said: “There is no argument. It is my firm belief that each of the rabbis you’ll find on page 85 of tractate Yoma of the Babylonian Talmud – Yishmael, Akiva, Elazar ben Azaryah, Yose ben Yehudah, Shmuel – all of them would have believed that it was their religious duty to be on the organ donor register.”

He was also a key spokesperson within the Jewish community for supporting changing the method of organ donation from an opt-in system to an opt-out version.

== Publications ==
=== Books ===
- Co-Editor of Progressive Judaism, Zionism and the State of Israel, edited by Dr Ed Kessler, Charley Baginsky and Josh Levy (2026), ISBN 9798253536209
