= Vallentine Mitchell =

British publishing company

- Country of origin: United Kingdom
- Headquarters location: Elstree, Hertfordshire
- Publication types: Books
- Nonfiction topics: Judaica
- Official website: www.vmbooksuk.com

Vallentine Mitchell is a publishing company based in Elstree, Hertfordshire, England. The company publishes books on Jewish-related topics. One of its earliest books was the first English-language edition of The Diary of Anne Frank. From the 1940s to the 1970s it was a publishing venture linked with The Jewish Chronicle. Frank Cass bought the company in 1971.

== See also ==
- Publication of Anne Frank's Diary in English
