= Gertrude Golda Lowy =

English suffragette (1887–1982)

- Born: 2 November 1887; Hampstead, Middlesex, England
- Died: 25 January 1982 (aged 94); Blacknell, London, England
- Organisation(s): Women's Social and Political Union, Jewish League for Woman Suffrage
- Spouse: Redcliffe Salaman (m. 1926, died 1955)
- Relatives: Albert Löwy (paternal grandfather), Ruth Gollancz (sister), Solomon Joseph Solomon (maternal uncle), Lily Delissa Joseph (maternal aunt), Ruth Collet (stepdaughter), Raphael Salaman (stepson)
- Awards: Hunger Strike Medal, Italian War Merit Cross

Gertrude "Golda" Lowy (2 November 1887 – 25 January 1982) was an English suffragette. She was a member of the Women's Social and Political Union (WSPU) and the Jewish League for Woman Suffrage. She was awarded the Hunger Strike Medal.

== Family ==
Lowy was born in Hampstead, Middlesex, the eldest daughter of an influential Jewish family of North London. Her parents were Ernest Daniel Lowy, son of Albert Löwy, and Henrietta Lowy (née Solomon). Her mother's siblings included the artists Solomon Joseph Solomon and Lily Delissa Joseph.

== Activism ==
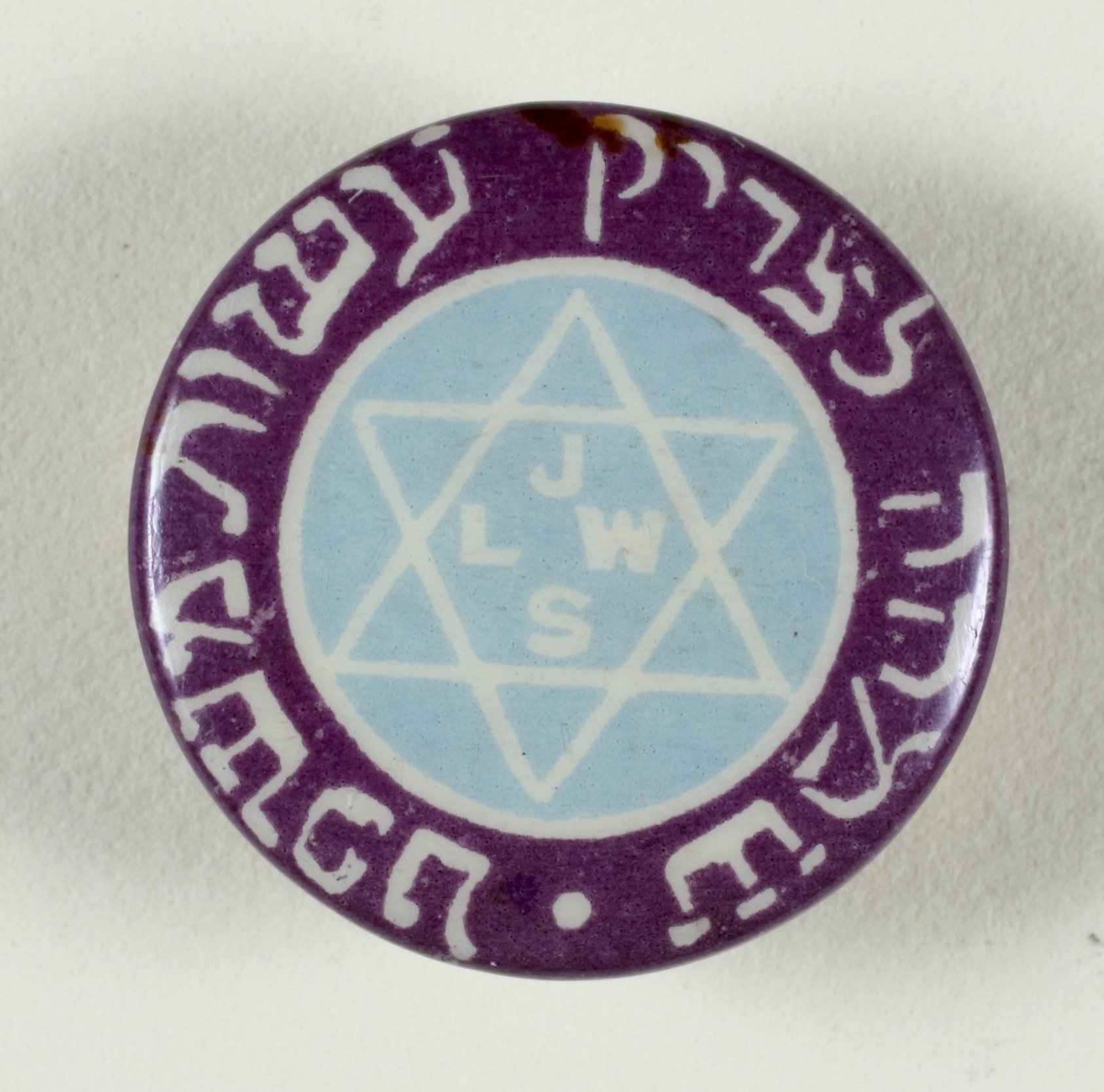
Jewish League for Woman Suffrage badge, from the collection of The Women's Library, London School of Economics and Political Science

Lowy, her mother and three sisters became active in the women's suffrage movement. Lowy was a militant, became a member of the Women's Social and Political Union (WSPU) in 1908 and joined the Jewish League for Woman Suffrage, when it was founded in 1912.

On 4 March 1912, Lowy participated in the "Great Militant Protest" which had been organised by Emmeline Pankhurst. She smashed the windows of Knightsbridge department stores. She was arrested, sentenced to two months imprisonment with hard labour, went on hunger strike whilst in prison and was force fed. She was awarded the Hunger Strike Medal, which is now held in the collection of The Jewish Museum London.

Lowy took photographs of fellow activists in the suffrage movement, such as Ada Wright. She ran the Photography stall at the WSPU's Summer Fair in 1913 and exhibited at the Royal Photographic Society in 1915.

== World War I ==
During World War I, Lowy enlisted with the Voluntary Aid Detachment (VAD) in 1917 and served as a radiographic assistant in Italy until 1919. She was awarded the Italian War Merit Cross for her service.

== Later life and death ==
Lowy married Redcliffe Nathan Salaman, botanist and expert on breeding blight-resistant potatoes, in 1926. His first wife Pauline "Nina" Ruth Davis had died in 1925. Salaman had been active in supporting the women's suffrage movement, for example the National Union of Women's Suffrage Societies (NUWSS) newspaper Common Cause reported in 1909 that he spoke in favour of votes for women at a meeting in Hertfordshire.

Lowy was painted by her uncle Solomon Joseph Solomon, and the portrait was exhibited at the Royal Academy of Arts and Ben Uri Gallery and Museum.

Lowy died in 1982, aged 94.
