= Golders Green Jewish Cemetery =

Cemetery in Golders Green, London Borough of Barnet, United Kingdom

Golders Green Jewish Cemetery (Hoop Lane Jewish Cemetery)
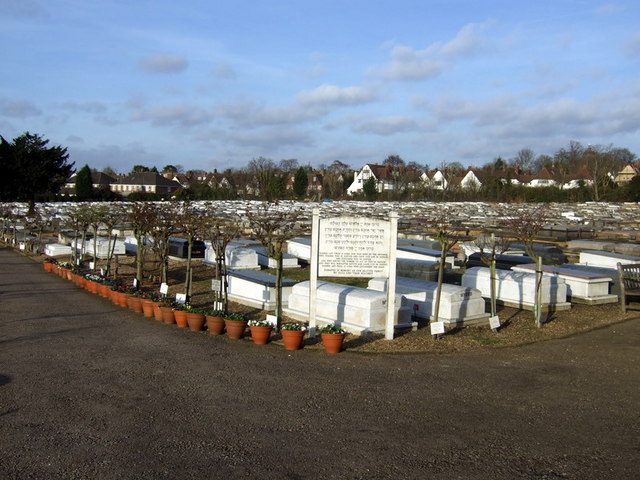
- The Jewish cemetery in Hoop Lane
- Interactive map of Golders Green Jewish Cemetery (Hoop Lane Jewish Cemetery)

Details
- Established: 1895
- Location: Golders Green, London Borough of Barnet
- Country: England, United Kingdom
- Coordinates: 51°34′38″N 00°11′37″W
- Type: Jewish
- Owned by: West London Synagogue and the S&P Sephardi Community (the Spanish and Portuguese Jews Congregation)
- Size: 16.5 acres (6.7 ha)
- Website: Hoop Lane Cemetery
- Find a Grave: Golders Green Jewish Cemetery

Golders Green Jewish Cemetery, usually known as Hoop Lane Jewish Cemetery, is a Jewish cemetery in Golders Green, London NW11. It is maintained by a joint burial committee representing members of the West London Synagogue and the S&P Sephardi Community (the Spanish and Portuguese Jews Congregation).

== Location ==
The cemetery is located on Hoop Lane, in Golders Green in the London Borough of Barnet, across the street from the Golders Green Crematorium. Just inside the gates is a small building, with two halls for burial services, and a drinking fountain. North Western Reform Synagogue is located in Alyth Gardens, on the boundary of the cemetery.

== History ==
The cemetery, which was opened in 1895, is divided into two parts. On the West Side, used by West London Synagogue, the graves are marked with upright stones. The East Side, used by the Spanish and Portuguese Jews' Congregation, is organised in the form of traditional Sephardi cemetery (one of the few left in London); the gravestones are laid horizontally, as traditionally the burial ground was too unstable for an upright stone.

== Notable burials ==
=== East Side ===
- Hakham Moses Gaster (1856–1939), Romanian, later British, scholar, the Hakham of the Spanish and Portuguese Jewish congregation in London, and a Hebrew and Romanian linguist
- Philip Guedalla (1889–1944), English barrister, popular historical and travel writer, and biographer
- Nathan Saatchi (1907–2000), Iraqi-born British businessman, a textile merchant who moved from Baghdad to London

=== West Side ===
==== Musicians ====
- Jacqueline du Pré (1945–1987), internationally acclaimed cellist, who converted to Judaism in 1967 and died from multiple sclerosis, aged 42
- Maurice Jacobson (1896–1976), pianist, composer and music publisher
- Paul Kossoff (1950–1976), rock guitarist best known as a member of Free

==== Philanthropists ====
- Sir Basil Henriques (1890–1961), philanthropist who wrote reforms to religious Jewish ceremonies and set up boys' clubs for deprived Jewish children
- Sir Sigmund Sternberg (1921–2016), philanthropist, interfaith campaigner, businessman and Labour Party donor

==== Politicians ====
- Leslie Hore-Belisha, 1st Baron Hore-Belisha (1893–1957), British Liberal politician
- Gerald Isaacs, 2nd Marquess of Reading (1889–1960), British Conservative politician and barrister
- Rufus Isaacs, 1st Marquess of Reading (1860–1935), British Liberal politician and barrister, buried at this cemetery after cremation
- Sir Philip Magnus (1842–1933), educational reformer and Liberal Unionist MP
- Sir Harry Samuel (1853–1934), Conservative Member of Parliament who campaigned against free trade during his political career
- Sir John Simon (1873–1854), British Liberal politician and barrister

==== Rabbis and teachers ====
- Rabbi Dr Leo Baeck (1873–1956), rabbi, scholar and theologian, who led the Reform Judaism movement in Germany and, after settling in London, chaired the World Union for Progressive Judaism
- Rabbi Charles Berg (1911–1979), the first non-Orthodox rabbi to be ordained in England
- Rabbi Curtis Cassell (1912–1998), rabbi in Germany, Britain and Rhodesia (now Zimbabwe)
- Rabbi Albert Friedlander (1927–2004), German-born rabbi in the United States and in Britain, who also taught at Leo Baeck College, London and became Vice President of the World Union for Progressive Judaism
- Rabbi Hugo Gryn (1930–1996), rabbi, broadcaster and Auschwitz survivor
- Professor Hans Liebeschuetz (1893–1978), medieval historian best known for his study of John of Salisbury
- Rabbi Dr Arthur Löwenstamm (1882–1965), theologian, writer and rabbi in Berlin and in London
- Rabbi Ignaz Maybaum (1897–1976), rabbi and theologian
- Rabbi Dr Harold Reinhart (1891–1969), American-born rabbi who was senior minister at West London Synagogue and the founding rabbi of Westminster Synagogue
- Professor Ben Segal (1912–2003), Professor of Semitic Languages at SOAS University of London
- Rabbi Dr Werner van der Zyl (1902–1984), rabbi in Berlin and London. Van der Zyl was a founder and President of Leo Baeck College, London, and also President of the Reform Synagogues of Great Britain (now known as the Movement for Reform Judaism); he was also Life Vice President of the World Union for Progressive Judaism.

==== Writers ====
- Sholem Asch (1880–1957), Polish-Jewish novelist, dramatist and essayist in the Yiddish language
- Marjorie Proops (1911–1996), agony aunt, who wrote the column Dear Marje for the Daily Mirror newspaper
- Jack Rosenthal (1931–2004), playwright, who wrote early episodes of ITV's Coronation Street and over 150 screenplays, including original TV plays, feature films, and adaptations

==== Others ====
- Emanuel Raphael Belilios (1837–1905), a Hong Kong opium dealer and businessman
- Julia Goodman (née Salaman; 1812–1906), portrait painter
- Stirling Henry Nahum (1906–1956), known professionally as Baron, society and court photographer
- Sir Frederick Claude Stern (1884–1967), botanist and horticulturalist, known for developing Highdown Gardens near Worthing, West Sussex
- Dr Friedrich Weleminsky (1868–1945), physician, scientist and a privatdozent in Hygiene (now called Microbiology) at the German University, Prague, who created a treatment for tuberculosis

== Gallery ==
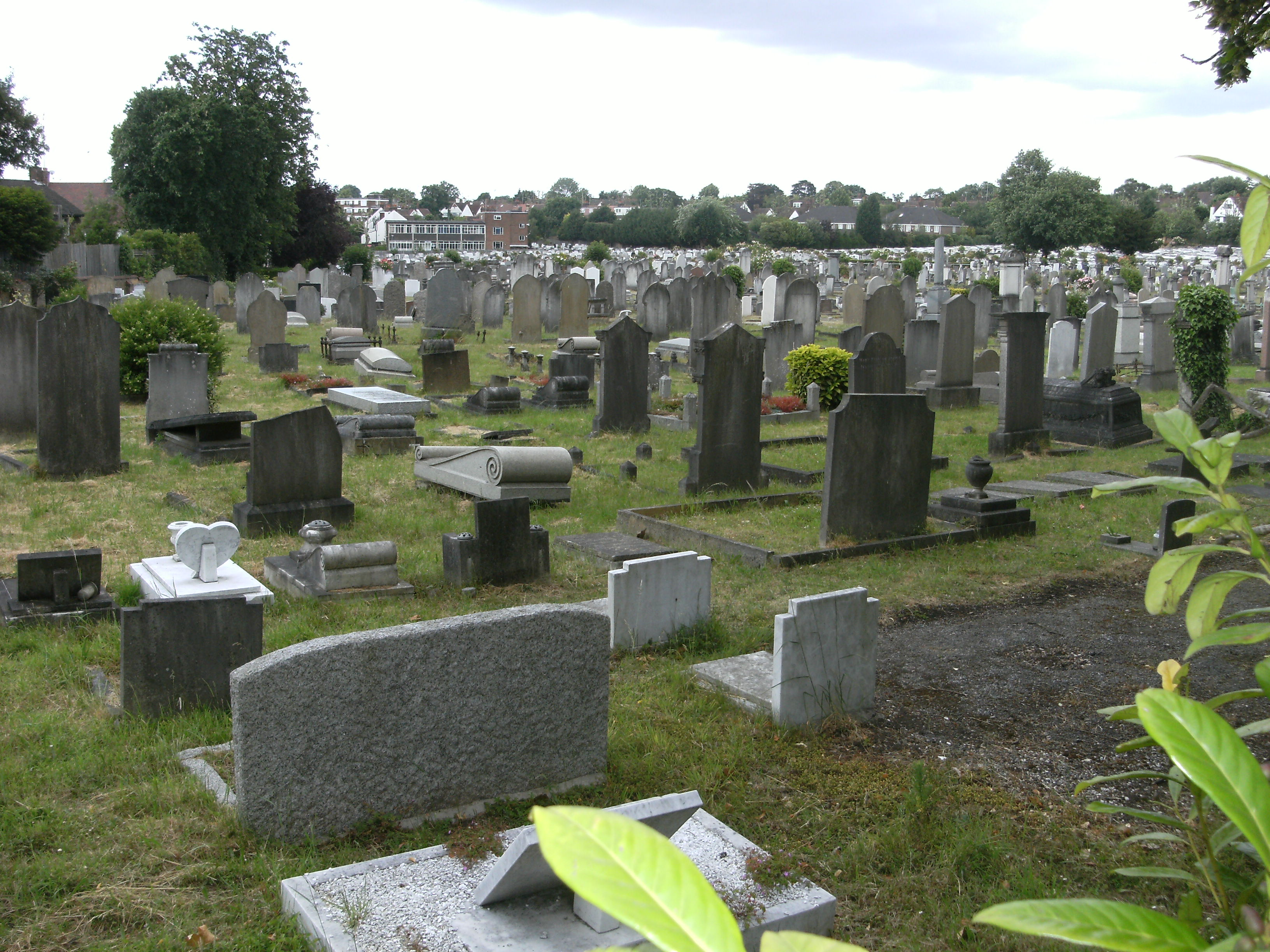
The cemetery, viewed from Hoop Lane

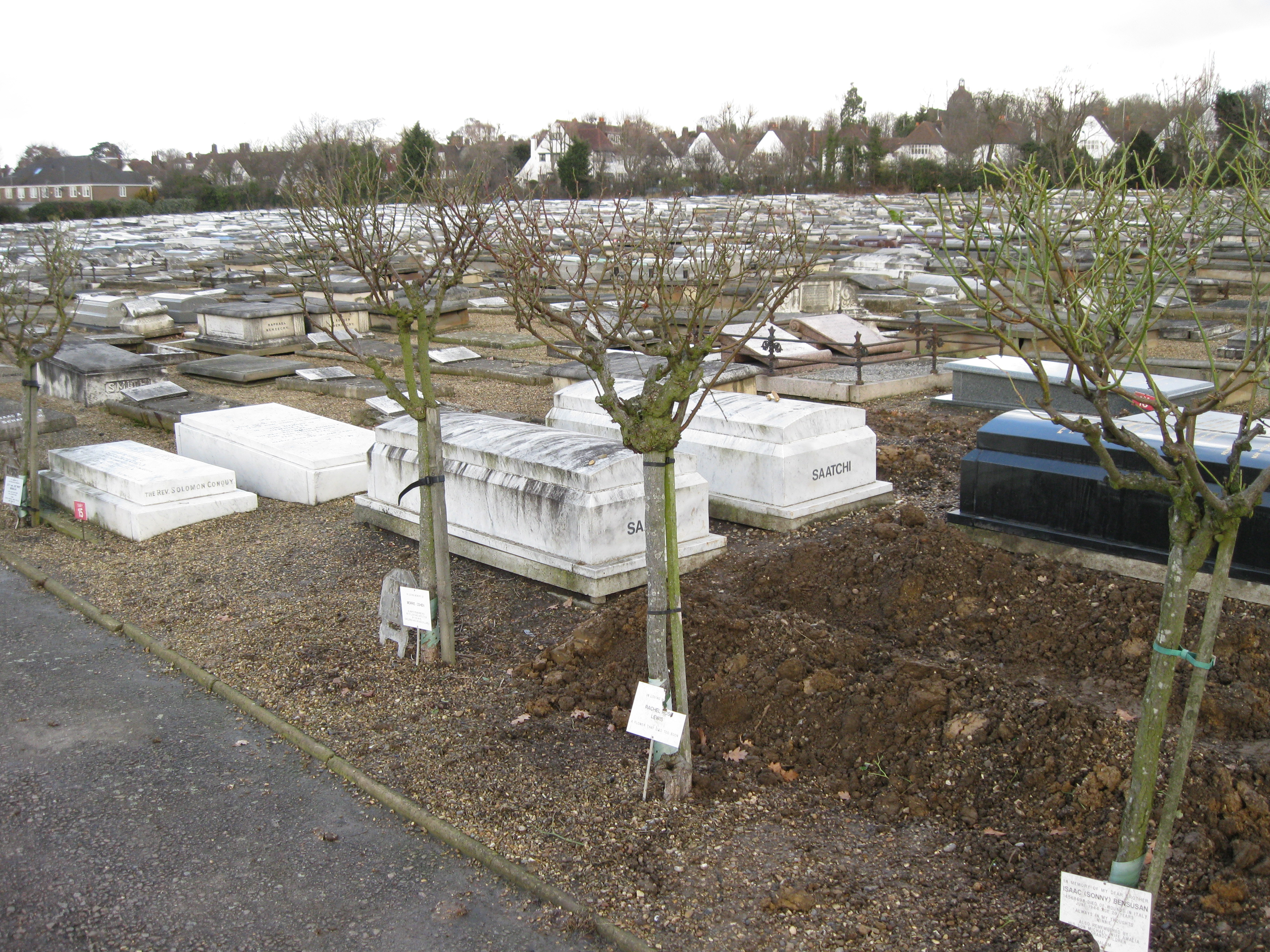
View of the East Side

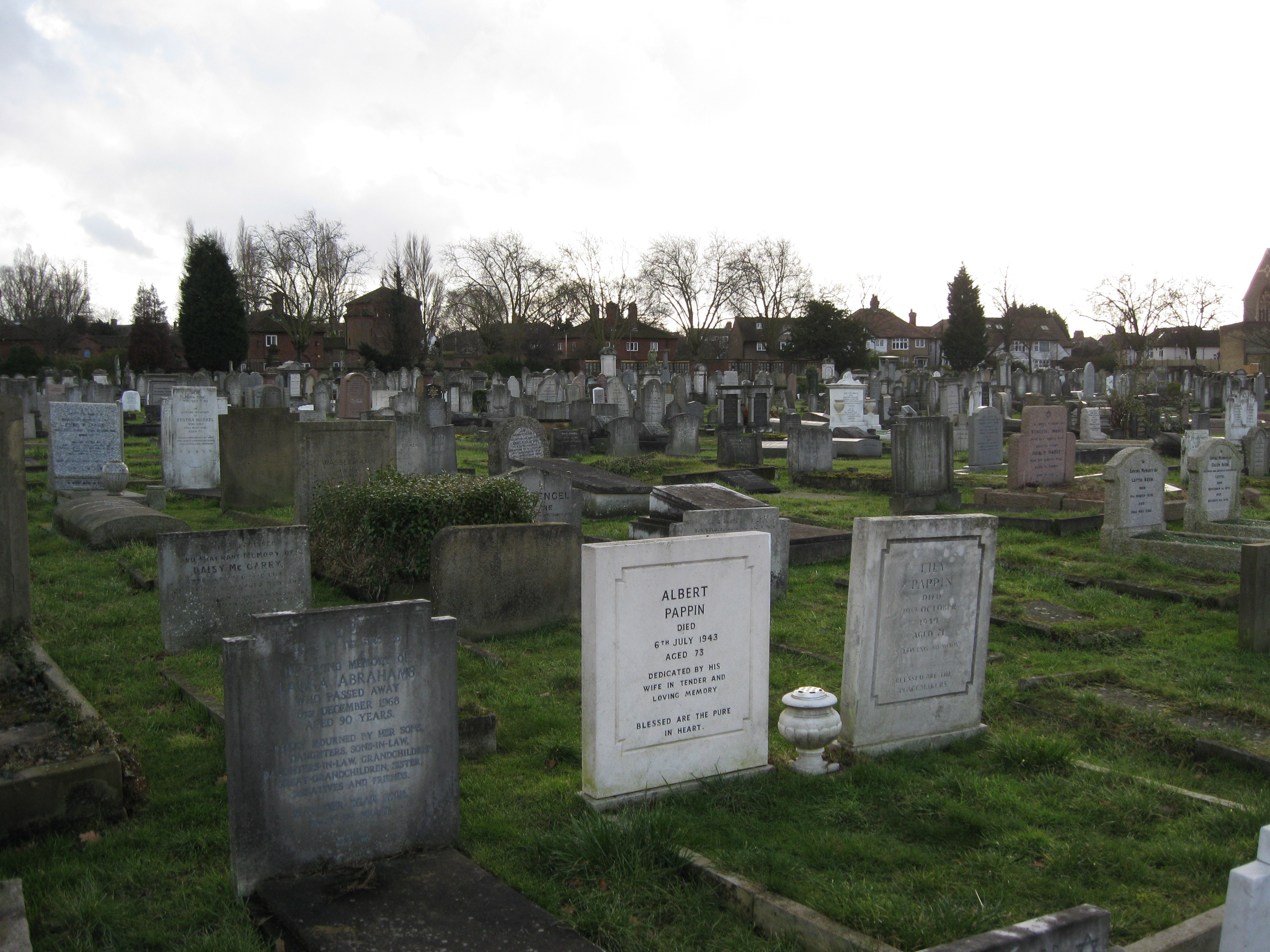
View of the West Side

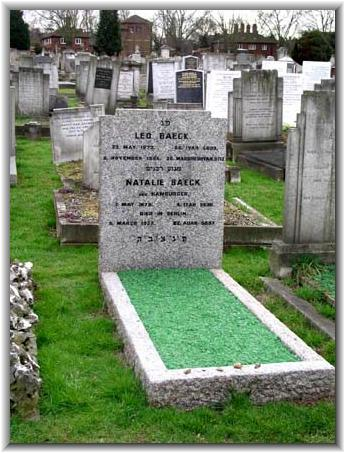
Grave of Leo Baeck and his wife Natalie

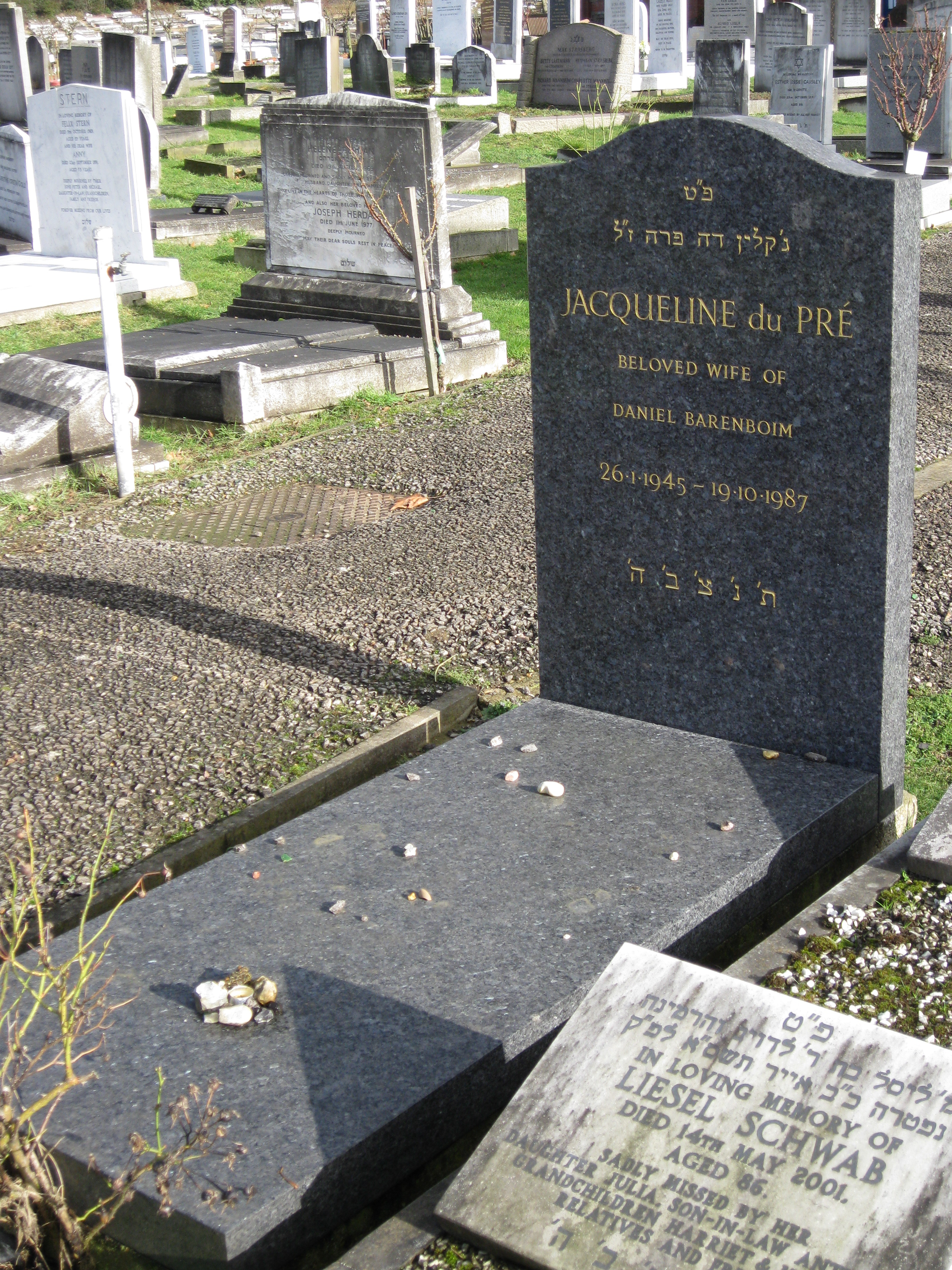
Grave of Jacqueline du Pré

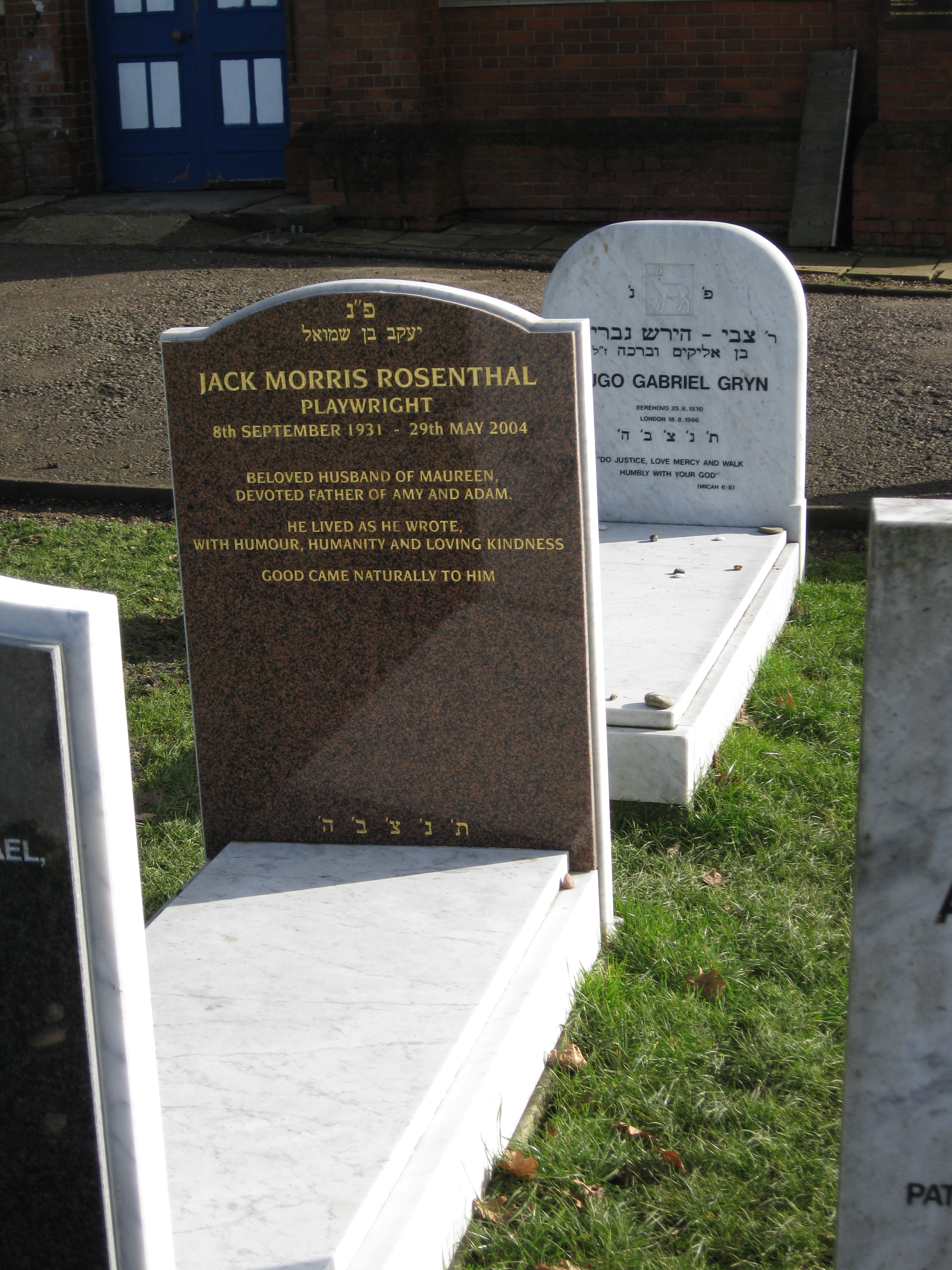
Graves of Rabbi Hugo Gryn and Jack Rosenthal

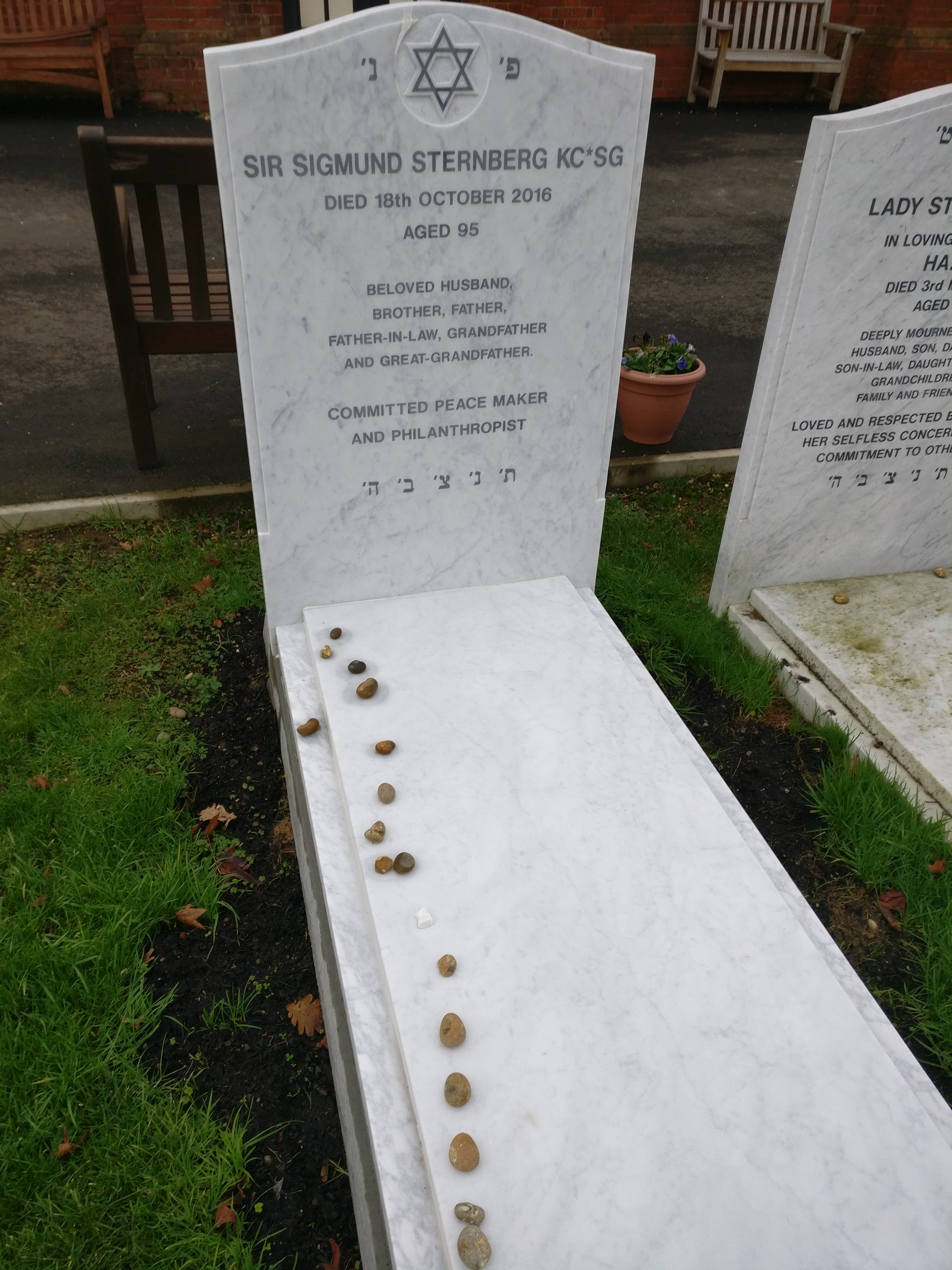
Grave of Sir Sigmund Sternberg

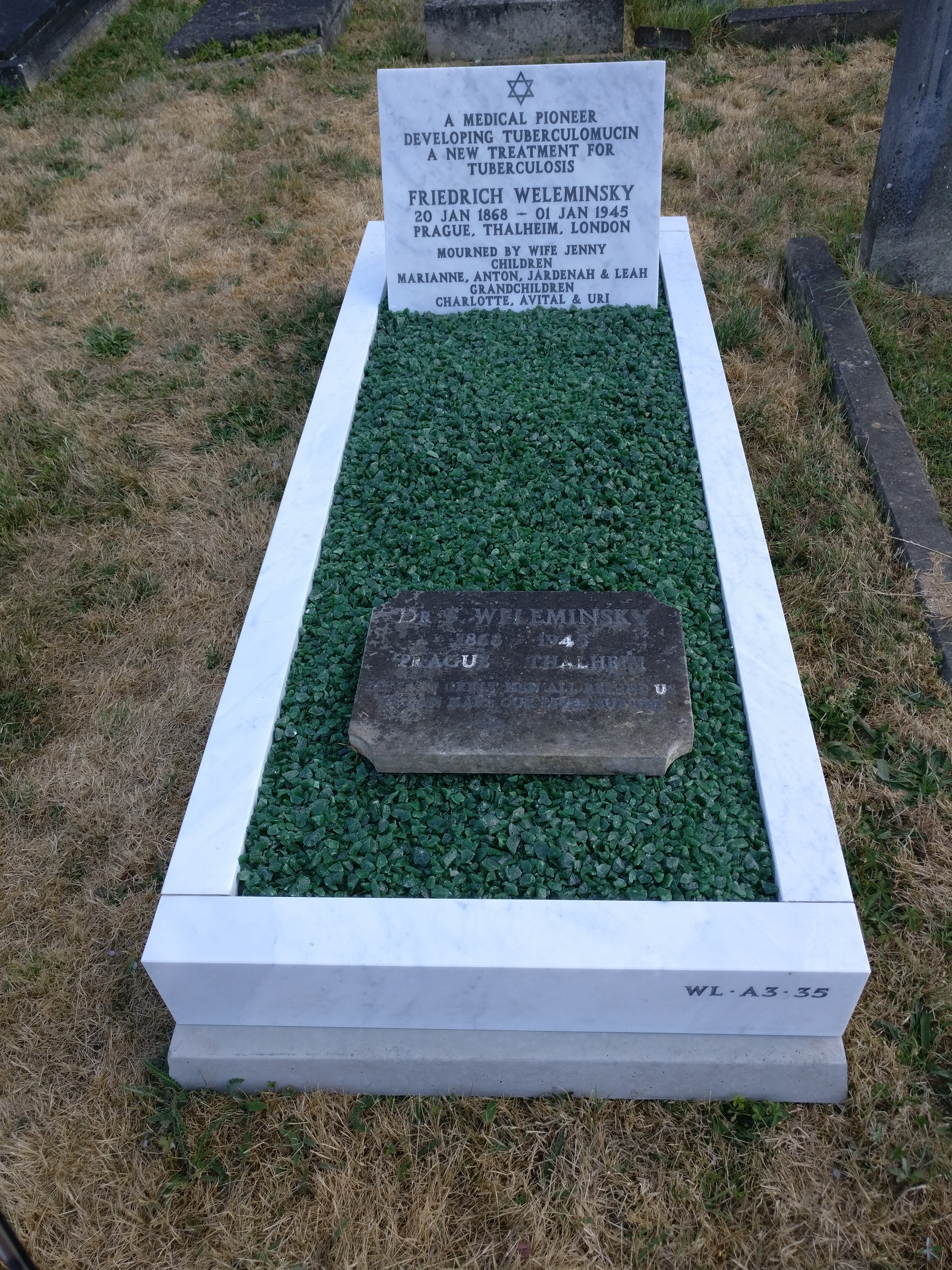
Grave of Dr Friedrich Weleminsky

== War graves ==
The cemetery also contains the graves of 24 Commonwealth service personnel that are registered and maintained by the Commonwealth War Graves Commission, 10 from World War I and 14 from World War II.

== Transport ==
The cemetery is easily reached by public transport:

- Bus: H2 passes the entrance; 13, 102 and 460 have stops nearby;
- Underground: Golders Green on the Northern line is a five-minute walk away from the cemetery.

== See also ==
- Balls Pond Road Cemetery
- Jewish cemeteries in the London area
- Movement for Reform Judaism § History
- West London Synagogue § History

== Sources ==
- Meller, Hugh & Parsons, Brian (2008). London Cemeteries: an illustrated guide and gazetteer. The History Press. ISBN 978-0-7509-4622-3.
- Epstein, Jon & Jacobs, David (2006). A History in our Time: Rabbis and Teachers Buried at Hoop Lane Cemetery. Movement for Reform Judaism and Leo Baeck College.
