= Helen Freeman =

Helen Freeman may refer to:

- Helen Freeman (actress) (1886–1960), American performer; mainly in silents
- Helen Freeman (conservationist) (1932–2007), American advocate for endangered species
- Helen Freeman (rabbi), English Reform Jewish rabbi; serving since 1990s
- Helen Freeman (basketball) (born 1989), English wheelchair player

== See also ==
- Helen Freedman (born 1941), American jurist; serving since 1979
- Helen Friedman, American clinical psychologist in St. Louis since 1981
- Ellen G. Friedman, American author, editor and academic since 1970s
