= Jenny Manson =

British Jewish activist (born 1948)

Co-Chair of Jewish Voice for Labour
- Incumbent
- Assumed office 28 July 2017
- Preceded by: Position established

Member of the Barnet London Borough Council for Colindale
- In office 8 May 1986 – 3 May 1990

Personal details
- Born: Jenny Rachel Salaman; November 1948 (age 77) Harpenden, England, UK
- Party: Labour
- Spouse: Michael Manson (m. 1969)
- Children: 2
- Relatives: Raphael Salaman (father); Redcliffe Salaman (paternal grandfather); Nina Salaman (paternal grandmother); Esther Salaman (maternal aunt)
- Education: Somerville College, Oxford (BA)

Jenny Rachel Manson (née Salaman; born November 1948) is a British Jewish activist, author, former civil servant, former Labour Party councillor for Colindale on Barnet London Borough Council, and co-chair of Jewish Voice for Labour.

== Early life ==
Manson was born in Harpenden, Hertfordshire, where, according to Manson, her family was the only Jewish family "and the only family that voted Labour". Her parents were Labour Party supporters and Campaign for Nuclear Disarmament (CND) activists.

Her father, Raphael Arthur Salaman (1906–1993) was an engineer and lexicographer of craftsmen's hand-tools who got news from Amnesty and CND delivered, and would read parts of the Bible to Manson. Her mother, Miriam Polianowsky (1914–2013), escaped a pogrom in 1917 and left Ukraine for Palestine where she lived in Haifa for 10 years before coming to England at the age of 15 and lived in Hampstead Garden Suburb.

In 1969, at the age of 20, Manson graduated with a degree in history from the University of Oxford where she studied at Somerville College.

== Background ==
Manson's family celebrated Passover and observed Yom Kippur, and her father's family were members of Bevis Marks Synagogue. Her paternal grandmother Nina Ruth Davis (1877–1925) was a Hebrew Hebraist and poet. Her paternal grandmother's parents were Arthur Davis and Louisa Jonas. Arthur Davis' family were precision instrument makers who had lived in England since the early 19th century.

Manson's paternal grandfather was botanist and potato breeder Dr Redcliffe Nathan Salaman FRS (1874–1955) who wrote The History and Social Influence of the Potato. Redcliffe's parents, Sarah Solomon (1844–1931) and Myer Salaman (1836–1896), were merchants who traded in ostrich feathers during the height of the plume trade. The Salaman family are Ashkenazi Jews, who according to Manson's paternal grandfather, migrated to Britain from Holland or the Rhineland in the early 18th century.

Manson's maternal aunt is writer Esther Salaman (née Polianowski) and her paternal aunt is singer Esther Salaman.

== Career ==
At the age of 21, Manson joined the Inland Revenue where she worked as a tax inspector, retiring from HM Revenue and Customs (HMRC) in November 2011. She then worked in her husband's publishing company for two years, before retiring completely in 2014.

Manson is now a trustee of two local charities and chairs Barnet Carers Centre. She was a governor of the Garden Suburb School and chair in North London of the Save the Children charity.

After leaving university, she wrote a book of essays about consciousness, What It Feels Like to Be Me, which was published in 2010. This led to Manson being invited by the Association of Jewish Refugees to talk to Holocaust survivors. She edited the 2012 book Public Service on the Brink, writing about the dangers of managerialism in reference to her period of being employed by HMRC.

== Labour Party ==
At the age of 16, Manson joined the Young Socialists and has been a member of the Labour Party since 1969. She ran as one of the Labour candidates for Garden Suburb ward (based around Hampstead Garden Suburb) in the May 1982 Barnet London Borough Council election, but all three seats were won by the Conservatives.

In the May 1986 Barnet London Borough Council election, she was elected as a councillor for the Colindale ward, serving until 1990. In June 1987, she unsuccessfully stood as a parliamentary candidate in Hendon North at the UK general election. She was inspired to become politically active again after Jeremy Corbyn was elected leader of the Labour Party in 2015. Manson is a General Committee member of Finchley and Golders Green Constituency Labour Party.

In July 2017, Manson was elected chair of Jewish Voice for Labour. She has said JVL was founded to advocate for Palestinian rights and "to tackle allegations of anti-Semitism in the Labour Party." She has stated that the organisation's mission is to "contribute to making the Labour party an open, democratic and inclusive party, encouraging all ethnic groups and cultures to join and participate freely."

In August 2017, Manson said that Jewish Voice for Labour would "provide a much-needed forum for Jews who want to celebrate and debate the long and proud history of Jewish involvement in socialist and trade-union activism." She added that they "invite everyone of Jewish heritage in the Labour Party to join us in continuing these great traditions." In September, she clarified that the organisation is "not anti-Zionist" but stated that it was "an alternative voice for Jewish members of Labour" who do not support the Jewish Labour Movement's "profoundly Zionist orientation". In October of that year, she added that the organisation was set up because "Jewish members of the Labour Party have been unrepresented in recent years" so it could "become the voice of Jewish Labour Party members and we will be able to say what we think about issues like racism, free speech and Israel-Palestine."

== Views ==
Manson identifies as anti-racist.

=== Israel and Palestine ===
In June 2018, she told The Jewish Chronicle "my views on Israel and Palestine have moved quite a lot in the last 20 or 30 years, like many people I suppose." In 1966, she visited Israel during her gap year where she stayed with her cousins on a kibbutz. She said about the visit, "I was shocked then by the way Arabs were talked about in Israel. I was most happy on the kibbutz because they had dialogue with Palestinians. I remember them coming in for secret conversations in the night" and that she felt "desperately frightened" for Israel during the Six-Day War. She said, "I don't think as a family we discussed or questioned Zionism. It had sort of just happened."

In 2001, she joined Jews for Justice for Palestinians, and in 2016, she visited Israel with Yachad and "met with groups like Breaking the Silence and got a worrying impression from them that they were fearing for their security from other Jews for speaking up against the current situation."

In April 2018, The Jewish Chronicle quoted Manson as saying she "began to identify as a Jew in order to argue against the state of Israel". She later stated, "I was saying that in the context of Jewish political activity I only identified with Jewish organisations as my concerns about Israel's activities grew intense."

=== IHRA working definition of antisemitism ===
In July 2018, Manson was criticised for comparing the International Holocaust Remembrance Alliance (IHRA) working definition of antisemitism with Section 28. She subsequently apologised for her "clumsy" analogy, which she claimed had been "misunderstood" by clarifying that she was "making a speech on the impact IHRA has in shutting down discussion" and "making the point that section 28 was a policy which acted as a deterrent, without there ever being a case where it was enacted."

In August 2019, she was a signatory of an open letter to The Guardian stating that Tower Hamlets London Borough Council's refusal to host an annual charity bike ride event in aid of Palestinian children in Gaza had vindicated concerns raised about the IHRA working definition of antisemitism, and that it "demonstrates that freedom of expression on Palestine in this country is now being suppressed".

=== Allegations of antisemitism in the Labour Party ===
In March 2018, Manson said on the BBC's Daily Politics TV programme that Jeremy Corbyn had taken "enormously strong action" to deal with antisemitism in the Labour Party. In April, Manson said on BBC Radio 4's Today programme, referring to a survey conducted by the Campaign Against Antisemitism: "Evidence including very recent evidence commissioned by a Jewish body suggests the very worst antisemitism is still on the right, on the far right and always has been."

In November 2019, Manson dismissed Chief Rabbi Ephraim Mirvis' comments that the Labour Party was "incompatible" with British values. She told ITV News that she had "never been happier than now" to be a Jew in the Labour Party, defended Corbyn, and said that the Mirvis did not represent all Jewish people.

The following month, in a letter to Director-General of the BBC Tony Hall and the BBC's news and current affairs director Francesca Unsworth, Manson, along with JVL co-chair Leah Levane, wrote: "In the closing stages of an acrimonious election campaign, the BBC's coverage of anti-semitism charges against the Labour Party has been both unbalanced and uncritical."

In January 2020, Manson, along with JVL co-chair Leah Levane, expressed concerns over the impact of the Board of Deputies of British Jews (BOD)'s 10-point pledge "to tackle the anti-semitism crisis" suggesting they would silence hundreds of their members and those who hold views that differ from the BoD.

In May 2020, in her role as JVL co-chair, Manson commented on the Jewish Labour Movement's submission to the Equality and Human Rights Commission (EHRC) in response to its investigation into institutional antisemitism in the Labour Party: "We find overwhelmingly that [JLM's submission] fails to establish its case that Labour 'is no longer a safe space for Jewish people or for those who stand up against anti-semitism'."

== Personal life ==
Manson is a secular Jew. She cites her family connection to Israel as influencing her views on Israel and the Israeli–Palestinian conflict. In 1969, after graduating from university, Manson moved to London and married Michael Manson, a medical and veterinary book publisher. They have lived in the same house in Hampstead Garden Suburb since 1973 and have two daughters, Jessica and Lydia, who both attended the Garden Suburb School.

== Books ==
| Year | Title | Credit | Publisher | ISBN |
|---|---|---|---|---|
| 2010 | What It Feels Like to Be Me | Author | Psyche Books | 978-1846943621 |
| 2012 | Public Service on the Brink | Editor | Imprint Academic | 978-1845403065 |

== See also ==
- British Jews
- List of British Jewish writers

Party political offices
| New title | Chair of Jewish Voice for Labour; 2017– | Succeeded by |
