= Harold Reinhart =

British rabbi

Personal life
- Born: 1891 Portland, Oregon, United States
- Died: 17 August 1969 (aged 77–78)
- Buried: Golders Green Jewish Cemetery

Religious life
- Religion: Judaism
- Denomination: Reform Judaism

Jewish leader
- Position: Rabbi
- Synagogue: West London Synagogue 1929–1957; Westminster Synagogue 1957–1969

Harold Frederic Reinhart (1891 – 17 August 1969) was an American-born rabbi who was senior minister at West London Synagogue and the founding rabbi of Westminster Synagogue.

Reinhardt had degrees from the University of Cincinnati and the University of Chicago. He received a doctorate in divinity from the Hebrew Union College in Cincinnati, and was ordained there in 1915.

Reinhard was Rabbi at Reform Jewish congregations in Gary, Indiana, Baton Rouge, Los Angeles and Sacramento, California before moving, in 1929, to the United Kingdom to continue his rabbinical career. He succeeded the Rev. Morris Joseph as senior minister at West London Synagogue in 1929. He remained in post until 1957, when he resigned to found what became Westminster Synagogue, where he was Rabbi from 1957 until his death in 1969.

He died on 17 August 1969 and, after cremation, his ashes were buried at Golders Green Jewish Cemetery. His papers are held at Southampton University.
