= Ruth Collet =

British painter, printmaker and illustrator (1909-2001)

- Born: Ruth Isabelle Salaman; 1909; Barley, Hertfordshire, England
- Died: 2001 (aged 91–92)
- Known for: Painting
- Spouse: Robert Collet

Ruth Isabelle Collet née Salaman (1909 – 2001) was a British painter, printmaker and illustrator.

== Biography ==
Collet was born in Barley in Hertfordshire into a talented family of artists and scientists. Her father was the botanist Redcliffe N. Salaman and her mother was the Hebrew scholar Nina Ruth Davis. After Bedales School Collet studied at the Slade School of Art in London from 1927 to 1930 and then trained in etching with S W Hayter in Paris between 1932 and 1935. She returned to London where she studied with Marian Kratochwil and Kathleen Browne and was associated for a time with the East London Group. Collet exhibited at the Royal Academy, with the New English Art Club and the London Group and the Women's International Art Club. Works by her were shown at the Leicester Galleries and at Gainsborough's House in Sudbury while she had a solo exhibition at the Annexe Gallery in London during 1982. Other solo shows were held at the Sue Rankin Gallery in 1987, at the Sternberg Centre for Judaism and at the Moss Gallery in 1991. The Ben Uri Gallery acquired a number of works by Collet in 1987.

Colet used her etching and printmaking skills to produce a large number of illustrations for the Westminster Synagogue in central London and also to illustrate a number of dust jackets for books. She was married to the musician and music historian Robert Collet and for many years the couple lived at Northwood near London. A memorial exhibition of her work was held in 2003 at the Broughton House Gallery in Cambridge.
