= Raphael Salaman =

British collector and writer of hand tools

Raphael Salaman FSA
- Born: Raphael Arthur Salaman; 24 April 1906; Barley, Hertfordshire, England
- Died: 31 December 1993 (aged 87); Harpenden, Hertfordshire, England
- Education: Bedales School
- Alma mater: University of Cambridge
- Occupations: Tool collector, writer
- Political party: Labour
- Spouse: Miriam Polianowsky (m. 1933)
- Children: 3; including Jenny Manson (daughter)
- Parent(s): Redcliffe N. Salaman (father); Nina Ruth Davis (mother)
- Relatives: Esther Polianowsky (sister-in-law)

Raphael Arthur Salaman FSA (24 April 1906 – 31 December 1993) was an English engineer, collector, and writer. His work recorded the hand tools used in Britain during the 18th, 19th and early 20th centuries.

== Biography ==
=== Family and education ===
R. A. Salaman, also known as Raph, was born in Barley, Hertfordshire into a well-established Anglo-Jewish family. His father was Dr Redcliffe N. Salaman, the botanist who wrote The History and Social Influence of the Potato. His mother Nina (née Davis) was a writer, poet and Hebrew scholar who tried to teach him Hebrew, which he found hard unlike his elder brothers. However, being Jewish was still important to Salaman and he used to tell his children about it and read the Bible.

The Salaman family were Ashkenazi Jews, who, according to his father, migrated to Britain from either Holland or the Rhineland in the early 18th century. His family were members of Bevis Marks Synagogue. Salaman's interest in tools developed from watching craftsmen in rural Hertfordshire.

Salaman attended Bedales School and then studied engineering at the University of Cambridge.

=== Career ===
After university Salaman set up his own light-engineering company in London. During the Second World War, he went to work for Marks and Spencer, organizing air-raid precautions (ARP) and fire-fighting. After the war he continued to work for the retailer. His job involved travelling around Britain, which gave him the opportunity to collect tools. He collected hand tools related to trades that were becoming less common, including those of wheelwrights, coopers, farriers, saddlers and dairy workers.

His interest in tools was more than a hobby, and he contributed to scholarly research in the subject. In 1959 he worked on a piece entitled, The Wheelwright's Art in Ancient China with Joseph Needham and Lu Gwei-djen.

Raph retired early and dedicated himself to compiling two definitive books about hand tools that have become standard reference works and are in the holdings of many libraries worldwide. The first, Dictionary of Woodworking Tools, was first published in 1975. His other book Dictionary of Leather-working Tools, c. 1700–1950, and the Tools of Allied Trades first came out in 1986.

=== Personal life and death ===
In 1933, Salaman married Miriam Polianowsky. The couple had one son and three daughters, including Jewish Voice for Labour Chair, Jenny Manson. Their family were the only Jewish family in the town and according to his daughter Jenny Manson "the only family that voted Labour." He and his wife were Labour Party supporters and actively involved with CND, and Salaman used to get news from Amnesty and CND delivered.

Salaman's elder brother Myer married Miriam's elder sister who became the writer Esther Salaman.

Salaman died in Harpenden, Hertfordshire, on 31 December 1993.

== Legacy ==
Salaman's collection of hand tools was bought by St Albans Museums Service. Part of the collection was on display for many years at the Museum of St Albans, but in 2010 it was removed from permanent exhibition. The tools remain in the reserve collection of the Museum Service. Some of his catalogues, price lists, books and drawings featured in an auction sale organized by David Stanley and held in Loughborough in 1987.

The Salaman Awards and Grants were established in memory of Raphael Salaman and are available to successful applicants through the Tools and Trades History Society.

== See also ==
- British Jews
- List of British Jewish writers
