= Albert Löwy =

Moravian-born English Hebrew scholar and Reform rabbi

The Rev. Dr. Albert Löwy FRGS

Personal life
- Born: Abraham Löwy; 8 December 1816 Aussee, Moravia, Austrian Empire
- Died: 21 May 1908 (aged 91) St John's Wood, London, United Kingdom
- Buried: Balls Pond Road Cemetery
- Spouse: Gertrude Lindenthal (m. 1851; died 1879)
- Children: Bella Löwy; Ruth Gollancz (granddaughter); Gertrude Lowy (granddaughter)
- Education: University of Vienna

Religious life
- Religion: Judaism
- Denomination: Reform Judaism

Jewish leader
- Position: Minister (1842–1892)
- Synagogue: West London Synagogue
- Organisation: Anglo-Jewish Association

Albert Löwy FRGS (8 December 1816 – 21 May 1908) was a Moravian-born English Hebrew scholar and Reform rabbi.

== Biography ==
He was born Abraham Löwy in Aussee, Moravia (now Úsov, Czech Republic), the eldest son of thirteen children of Leopold and Katty Löwy. He was named after his ancestor Rabbi Abraham Leipnik, who wrote in Hebrew an account of the destruction of the synagogue in Aussee in 1720. In 1822 his father left Aussee for Friedland, on the border of Silesia, where he owned a brewery. In 1829 Albert left home for schools in Leipzig, Jagendorf, and Olmütz, and eventually attended the University of Vienna, where he began a systematic study of Hebrew and Arabic.

Among his friends and fellow students there were Moritz Steinschneider and Abraham Benisch, with whom in 1838 he founded 'Die Einheit,' a proto-Zionist secret society of some two hundred students of the University, most of them Jews, who were endeavouring to promote the welfare of the Jews, one of their aims being to establish Jewish settlements in Palestine. In 1840 Löwy visited England to promote the society's aims (encountering mainly indifference), and there he settled for life. On the opening on 27 January 1842 of the reform West London Synagogue of British Jews, Löwy became one of the first two ministers; David Woolf Marks was the other. He ran the congregation's school, and with his colleague he edited the prayer-book of the new congregation, which he served until 1892.

In 1870, under the guidance of Löwy and Benisch, the Anglo-Jewish Association was formed in London to champion the cause of persecuted Jews and to promote Jewish education in the Middle East. In 1874 Löwy, after attending a Jewish conference at Königsberg on the Russo-Jewish question, was sent by the Anglo-Jewish Association on a secret mission to Russia. His report on the position of the Russian Jews was published as an appendix to the Annual Statement of the Anglo-Jewish Association for 1874. He also undertook a fact-finding mission to Constantinople in 1889, and stimulated Western Jewry's interest in the Bene Israel community of India. Lowy was secretary of the Association from 1875 until his resignation in 1889.

On 31 October 1892 he resigned his ministry at the West London Synagogue, but he took part in public affairs until his death in London on 21 May 1908. He was buried at the Balls Pond Road Cemetery of the West London Synagogue.

== Work ==
Löwy's knowledge of Samaritan literature enabled him to collect and catalogue in 1872 the Samaritan manuscripts belonging to the Earl of Crawford, and in 1891 he completed his chief task as a scholar, the Catalogue of Hebraica and Judaica in the Library of the Corporation of the City of London. He engaged in the controversy over the Mesha Stele at the Louvre, the genuineness of which he contested. In 1903 he printed for private circulation A Critical Examination of the so-called Moabite Inscription in the Louvre. Löwy also won repute as a teacher of Hebrew, and among his pupils were Archibald Tait, archbishop of Canterbury, the Marquess of Bute, and Thomas Chenery, editor of The Times. He was a member of the council of the Society of Biblical Archaeology, and founded in 1870 the Society of Hebrew Literature (continued until 1877), and edited its publications. In 1893 the University of St Andrews conferred upon him the honorary degree of LL.D.

=== Partial bibliography ===
- Miscellany of Hebrew Literature. Publications of the Society of Hebrew Literature, pt.1. Vol. 1–2. London: N. Trübner and Co. 1872–1877.
- Form of Burial Service Used by the Members of the West London Synagogue of British Jews (2nd ed.). London: Wertheimer, Lea and Co. 1882. With David Woolf Marks.
- Memoir of Sir Francis Henry Goldsmid (2nd ed.). London: Kegan Paul, Trench, and Co. 1882. With David Woolf Marks.
- Catalogue of Hebracia and Judaica in the Library of the Corporation of the City of London. London: Wertheimer, Lea and Co. 1891.
- Half a Century of Progress in the Knowledge and Practice of Judaism. London: Wertheimer, Lea and Co. 1893.
- The Measure of Our Days: A Tri-lingual Song (in English, Hebrew, and German). London: s.n. 1897.
- A critical examination of the so-called Moabite inscription in the Louvre. London: s.n. 1903. Published in German as Die Echtheit der moabitischen Inschrift im Louvre.
- The Sufferings of the Jews during the Middle Ages. Library of Jewish Classics. Vol. 1. New York: Bloch Publishing Company. 1907. Translated from the German of Leopold Zunz.
