= Redcliffe Salaman =

English botanist

- Born: Redcliffe Nathan Salaman; 12 September 1874; Kensington, London, England, United Kingdom
- Died: 12 June 1955 (aged 80); United Kingdom
- Education: St Paul's School
- Alma mater: Trinity Hall, Cambridge
- Spouses: Nina Ruth Davis (m. 1901; died 1925) Gertrude Lowy (m. 1926)
- Children: 6 (incl. Raphael Salaman and Ruth Collet)
- Scientific career
- Doctoral students: Jack Hawkes

Redcliffe Nathan Salaman (12 September 1874 – 12 June 1955) was a British physician, biologist who pioneered the breeding of blight-free potatoes, Jewish nationalist, race scientist and key figure in the Anglo-Jewish community in the 20th century. His groundbreaking 1949 book The History and Social Influence of the Potato established the history of nutrients as a new literary genre.

== Early life and education ==
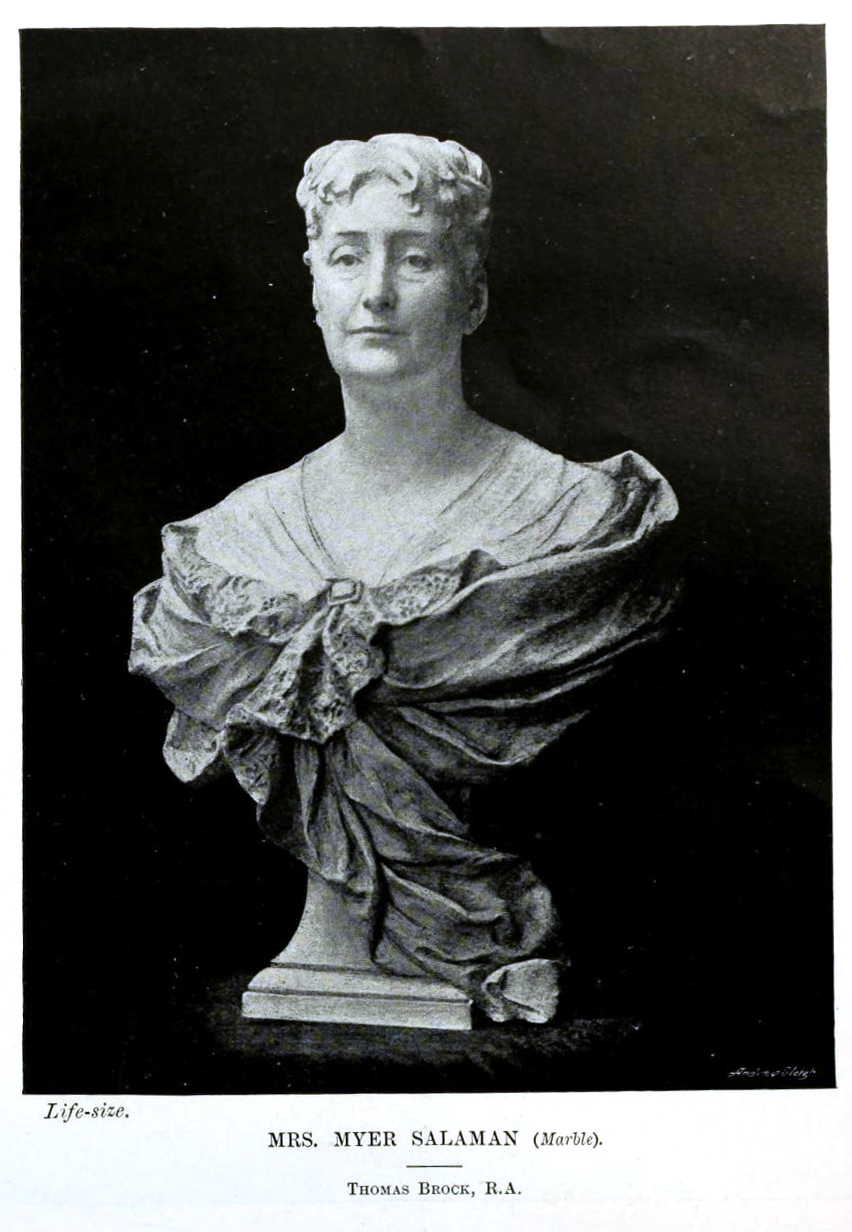
Bust of Salaman's mother Sarah

Salaman was born in Kensington, London, and was the ninth of fifteen children born to Sarah (née Solomon) and Myer Salaman. His father was a wealthy merchant who traded in ostrich feathers at the height of the plume trade. The Salaman family were Ashkenazi Jews, who according to Salaman, migrated to Britain from either Holland or the Rhineland in the early 18th century.

He was educated at St Paul's School, London, where he studied classics and science, and became head boy of the school's Science Side. He obtained a scholarship at Trinity Hall, Cambridge in 1893 and graduated with a first class degree in Natural Sciences in 1896, having studied physiology, zoology and chemistry. he was influenced by Michael Foster and was tutored and advised by the physiologist W. H. Gaskell, who later became a good friend of Salaman. While at Cambridge, he learned German from Solomon Schechter's wife. He moved to the London Hospital in 1896 to study medicine and remained there until he qualified in 1900. He then studied experimental pathology at Würzburg and Berlin in 1901-2 before returning to London.

== Research ==
In 1903, Salaman was appointed Director of the Pathological Institute at the London Hospital, but in 1904 he developed tuberculosis and had to stop practising medicine and spend six months in a Swiss sanitorium. It took him over two years to fully recover from the illness. He purchased a house in Barley, Hertfordshire and, because he could not return to practising medicine, began experimenting in the emerging science of genetics under the guidance of his friend William Bateson. After several failed experiments with a range of animals and seeking advice from his gardener, Salaman decided to experiment with potatoes. Later in his career, commenting on his decision to study potatoes, Salaman noted that he had "embarked on an enterprise which, after forty years, leaves more questions unsolved than were thought at that time to exist. Whether it was mere luck, or whether the potato and I were destined for life partnership, I do not know, but from that moment my course was set, and I became ever more involved in problems associated directly or indirectly with a plant with which I had no particular affinity, gustatory or romantic".

Working in his private garden, he initially set out to cross two potato varieties and establish which traits were dominant and recessive in a similar manner to Gregor Mendel's work on peas, but he soon broadened into other areas. In 1908, he decided to include wild potatoes in his experiments and requested that Kew Gardens provide him with Solanum maglia. Kew's stocks had been incorrectly labelled, however, and Salaman was sent Solanum edinense instead. In 1909, Salaman grew 40 self-fertilised crosses of S. edinense and found that seven of them did not succumb to late blight (Phytophthora infestans). Convinced that resistance to late blight existed in wild species he began to study other species and found that Solanum demissum was also resistant to blight. Salaman started to cross S. demissum with domesticated varieties of potato in 1911 to produce high yielding lines that were also resistant to late blight. By 1914, he had successfully created hybrids and in 1926 he remarked that he had produced varieties with "reasonably good economic characteristics which, no matter what their maturity, appeared to be immune to late blight. Salaman was the first to identify genetic resistance to late blight and S. demissum was still used as a source of resistance in the 1950s. In The Propitious Esculent, John Reader called Salaman's discovery "an important breakthrough, offering real promise ... that it was possible to breed blight-resistant potato varieties". In 1987, it was thought that half of the potato varieties cultivated in Europe contained genes from S. demissum.

In 1910, he published a paper on the inheritance of colour in potato in the first issue of the Journal of Genetics. Later papers in the Journal of Agricultural Science examined male sterility, methods for estimating yields detecting viruses in seed potatoes and a study of how the size of seed tubers affected the yield and size of tubers of the crop. He wrote the book Potato Varieties in 1929.

His research on potatoes was disrupted by the outbreak of the First World War, during which Salaman joined the Royal Army Medical Corps and served in Palestine. Afterwards he was appointed chairman of the potato synonym committee at the National Institute of Agricultural Botany where he was tasked with describing potato varieties and putting an end to the common practice of marketing old and unreliable varieties under new names. His work there culminated in the publication of Potato Varieties in 1926. The same year he persuaded the Ministry of Agriculture to establish the Potato Virus Research Institute in Cambridge, of which he remained a director until 1939. Kenneth Manley Smith was an entomologist at the institute and Frederick Charles Bawden became Salaman's assistant in 1930. Smith and Bawden went on to become renowned plant virologists. In conjunction with Paul A. Murphy of Dublin. a large stock of virus-free potatoes was built up and multiplied in greenhouses, a practice which continued after his death and was adopted in other countries. His research on viruses lead to him being elected to the Royal Society in 1935.

=== The History and Social Influence of the Potato ===
Salaman authored The History and Social Influence of the Potato first published in 1949, reprinted in 1970, and revised under the guidance of his former doctoral student Jack Hawkes in 1987. A review of the first edition in the British Journal of Sociology noted that it was an "unusual and vastly interesting book which took nine years to write, and a life-time to prepare" combining genetics, history and archaeology. The book covers every aspect of the history of the potato with a particular focus on Ireland, about which he wrote "in no other country can [potato's] influence on the domestic and economic life of the people be studied to greater advantage".

The historian Eric Hobsbawm referred to the work as "that magnificent monument of scholarship and humanity". A 1999 paper in Potato Research noted that because of Salaman's "unprecedented" book, we "know more about the impact of the diffusion of potato on the welfare of people, particularly the poor, than about such consequences following the introduction of any other major food plant."

=== Eugenics ===
Salaman also took an interest in eugenics with a special interest in Jews and the supposed unique genetic traits. He tried to characterize the typical Jewish face and considered that the separation of Sephardis and Ashkenazis had led to divergent characters. He published these ideas in the first volume of the newly founded Journal of Genetics in 1911. His work was critiqued by Harold Laski who writing in Biometrika in 1912, called it "scientifically ludicrous".

== Political affiliations and other memberships ==
Salaman was a proponent of Zionism and Jewish causes, and in 1907, he was elected president of the English Zionist Federation.

In his academic life, he was president of the Jewish Historical Society, a council member for the Jews’ College (today the London School of Jewish Studies), a founder of the Jewish Health Organization of Great Britain, and a member of the board of governors of the Hebrew University of Jerusalem.

In 1933, he was a founding member of the Academic Assistance Council, which helped scientists fleeing the Nazi regime, and in 1945 was chairman of the Jewish Committee for Relief Abroad as it worked to rehabilitate survivors of the extermination camps.

== Personal life ==
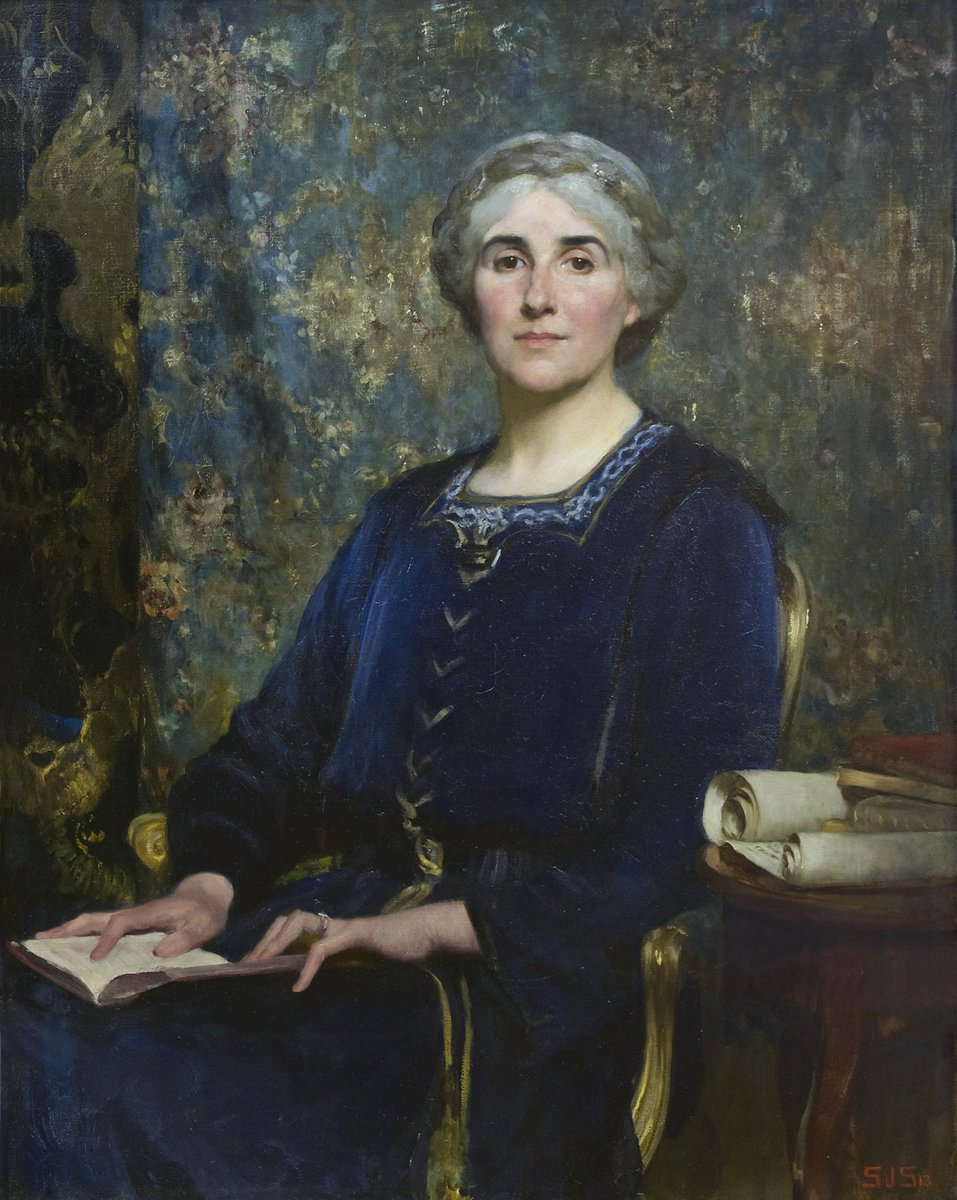
Nina Salaman in 1918

On 23 October 1901, Salaman married Hebrew scholar Nina Ruth Davis, whom he had met four months earlier at the New West End Synagogue. They were engaged ten days after meeting. After living in Berlin for several months, while Redcliffe completed advanced training in pathology, they returned to London, where he assumed the directorship of the Pathological Institute at the London Hospital. They had six children including the pathologist Myer Head Salaman, the doctor Arthur Gabriel Salaman, the engineer Raphael Salaman, the artist Ruth Collet and the singer Esther Sarah Salaman. They settled in the country, in the village of Barley in Hertfordshire, where they lived with their six children (one of whom died in childhood). Nina Salaman continued to pursue her interest in medieval Hebrew poetry. Despite Barley's distance from London, she maintained a kosher home and Sabbath observance. For the festivals, the family traveled to London, where they stayed with one of Redcliffe's siblings and attended the New West End Synagogue. She took personal responsibility for the Hebrew education of her children until they left for boarding school.

In 1925, Salaman's first wife Nina died. In 1926, he met and married Gertrude Lowy (1887–1982)—granddaughter of Albert Löwy—who survived him.

Salaman's paternal granddaughter is Chair of Jewish Voice for Labour Jenny Manson.

== Biographical works ==
Salaman's life is recalled in the 2022 biographical work The Last Anglo-Jewish Gentleman: The Life and Times of Redcliffe Nathan Salaman by Todd Endelman, as part of a series entitled "The Modern Jewish Experience" by Indiana University Press.
