= Mark Winer =

American interfaith activist and scholar

Rabbi Mark Leonard Winer MBE (16 December 1942) is an American interfaith activist and scholar. In the 2014 UK Honours List published in the London Gazette on 30 December 2013, it was announced that Queen Elizabeth II had appointed Rabbi Winer a Member of the Order of the British Empire (MBE) for "promoting interfaith dialogue and social cohesion in London and the UK." The MBE was for Rabbi Winer's work in building community and interfaith relations during his tenure as Senior Rabbi of the West London Synagogue of British Jews, a Movement for Reform Judaism synagogue, from April 1998 to September 2010, and for his continuing interfaith leadership in London and the UK after his retirement from West London Synagogue through FAITH UK.

In May 2013, Rabbi Winer was appointed the Director of the Center for Ecumenical and Interreligious Studies of St. Thomas University in Miami, Florida, the diocesan university of the Archdiocese of Miami. He is also adjunct professor of religion at St. Thomas. Rabbi Winer has been the President of FAITH: the Foundation to Advance Interfaith Trust and Harmony, a US public charity, since he founded it in 1995. He founded a sibling British charity with the same name, registered with the UK Charity Commission, in 2010. He has served as Chairman of the International Interfaith Task Force for the World Union for Progressive Judaism since 1998.

== Early life ==
Rabbi Winer was born in Logan, Utah on 16 December 1942, and raised in Dallas, Texas. He graduated from Harvard University magna cum laude in 1964 and earned a PhD with highest distinction in 1977 at Yale University in Sociology, Comparative Religion, Contemporary Jewry and Race and Ethnic Relations. He was ordained as a rabbi in 1970 at the Hebrew Union College-Jewish Institute of Religion in New York City.

== Career ==
Rabbi Winer served as a congregational rabbi for over 30 years in the United States, serving Temple Emanuel in Orange, Connecticut; Temple Beth David in Commack, New York; and the Jewish Community Center / Congregation Kol Ami in White Plains, New York. Rabbi Winer has been Rabbi Emeritus of Kol Ami since 1998.

Prior to becoming senior rabbi at West London Synagogue in 1998, he was the president of the National Council of Synagogues (USA). He has been involved in several international events, including resolving the issues that led to the Treaty between Israel and the Vatican. He was also a key negotiator for the release of Ethiopian Jews and the resolution to the dispute over the Carmelite convent at Auschwitz.

He was designated twice as Chaplain to the Lord Mayor of Westminster, in 2000–2001 for Councillor Michael Brahams, and in 2008–2009 for Councillor Louise Hyams.

== Family ==
Rabbi Winer married Suellen Mark Bleifer on 3 July 1978. His wife is a Certified Public Accountant (CPA). Together, they have three children (Beth, Adam and Rachel) and four grandsons.
