= The Propitious Esculent =

2008 book by John Reader

The Propitious Esculent: The Potato in World History
- Author: John Reader
- Publisher: Random House
- Publication date: 2008
- Media type: Hardcover
- Pages: 320
- ISBN: 0-434-01318-8
- OCLC: 176824296

The Propitious Esculent: The Potato in World History is a book by John Reader outlining the role of the potato (the esculent of the title) in world history. It was also published under the titles The Untold History of the Potato and Potato: A History of the Propitious Esculent.

The potato has been present and influential during the major events in the last 500 years. These include the historical moments of discovery and culture change that have led to the present globalized world. Potatoes had a single region of origin; how they moved from place to place has affected the variety of tubers and the people and places that received them. Reader's book aims to contextualize the potato in world history.

Reader presents the information and ideas in The Propitious Esculent building on the work of two important scholars: Redcliffe N. Salaman and William H. McNeill. In 1949 Salaman wrote a book, The History and Social Influence of the Potato. After publishing the very influential The Rise of the West (1963) and Plagues and Peoples (1976), McNeill published an essay called, “How the Potato Changed the World’s History” in 1999. Reader describes their contributions to the understandings of the development and role of the potato in the modern world. He then combines their publications with newly available information from the world of genetics and late 20th century history for a more complete understanding of the potato as a player on the world stage.

== Synopsis ==
Reader divides his exploration of the potato into three sections: South America, Europe, The World.

=== South America ===
The first section describes the environments, The Andes Mountains and the altiplano, in which the potato developed. In the past, at least 3,000 years ago, people living in these environments began to take advantage of a naturally occurring plant. Over time human interaction developed a flowering plant with a nutritionally valuable, and good tasting, tuber that then became an important component of the human diet. Reader spends several pages describing the way in which the Spanish set up colonies and an empire in South America to mine mineral resources and exploit available manpower. He lays out the time line of events and shows that it took several decades for the value of the potato to become obvious to any of the Europeans. Interspersed in this discussion, Reader describes current conditions of potato growing through the Andean region.

=== Europe ===
In the second section of the book, Reader traces the potato's path across the Atlantic Ocean. The many stops on Atlantic islands gave the plant time to adjust to different environments and day lengths. Reader devotes many pages to the process of determining who had the potato first and where they were growing it and for what scale of consumption. This seems like a Western concern rooted in basic competition. However, tracing this particular time line illustrates commodity chains, economic development, culture change (including scientific theory and method), and biological change.

In Europe, the potato was not immediately well received. Reader discusses how it was accused of causing leprosy or other ailments and then how cultural groups’ perception of the potato flipped and it became something entirely healthful. The potato also is at the center of demographic and cultural change and this is most clear in the case of Ireland. Reader's explanation of what happened during the great European Potato Failure of 1845 to 1850 discusses the biosocial and biopolitical processes of the period. The Propitious Esculent proposes that the fate of Ireland was not solely the fault of a fungus but the result of a chain of governmental decisions that were set into motion because of the properties of the potato.

=== Worldwide ===
In the final portion of the book, Reader outlines the worldwide spread of the potato and how people around the globe have set out to study the potato to protect its genetic health. The potato spread successfully in part due to the lessons learned after Great Famine of Ireland in which biologists and farmers created methods to prevent fungus induced blight. The second point, protecting genetic health, is especially important since such a large part of the global population is dependent on the potato for a stable diet. Since there has been such a long period of human intervention in the development of the potato, it has genetic properties that have become rare as well as weaknesses in the genetic code that lead to defects in different parts of the plant. Pooling global knowledge and resources, biologists, ecologists, and anthropologists at the International Potato Center are securing the varieties of the potato.
