= David Woolf Marks =

British rabbi

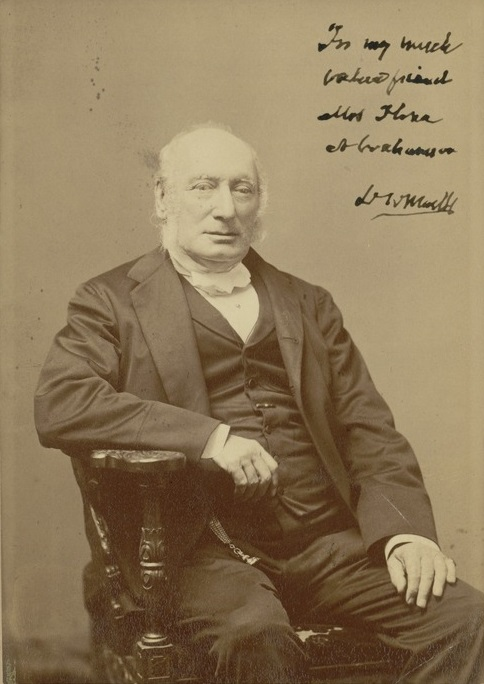
- Portrait of David Woolf Marks
- Born: 22 November 1811; London, United Kingdom
- Died: 3 May 1909 (aged 97); United Kingdom
- Occupations: Hebrew scholar, minister
- Known for: Founding religious leader of the West London Synagogue
- Notable work: Advocacy of Progressive Judaism
- Children: Harry Marks

David Woolf Marks (22 November 1811 – 3 May 1909) was a British Hebrew scholar and minister. He was the first religious leader of the West London Synagogue, which seceded from the authority of the Chief Rabbi, where he advocated a quasi-Karaite philosophy.

== Biography ==
Marks was born in London. His father was a merchant named Woolf Marks and his mother's name was Mary. Marks senior died when his son was just nine years old, in July 1821, and the child was sent to attend Jews' Free School, where he soon emerged as a prodigy. He spent most of the time tutoring other pupils in Hebrew, while studying advanced material at night. He supported himself by iterating Kaddish for the soul of a deceased man and reading the Bible for the blind wife of Rabbi Solomon Hirschell, thus becoming his confidant. He earned a hundred pounds, a vast sum at the time, when the School's principal died and he replaced him for a while. That money sufficed to sustain him for five years in Hirschell's boarding school at Hammersmith, where he taught various subjects. In 1831 he abandoned this career to serve as assistant reader at the Western Synagogue, St Alban's Place, Haymarket. He was named assistant reader and secretary to the Seel Street Liverpool congregation in 1833.

During the 1820s, some intellectuals among Anglo-Jewry were influenced by the bibliocentric convictions of Anglican society, which regarded Testament alone as sanctified and scorned the Jews for valuing the Talmud. In 1833, Isaac D'Israeli published an anonymous pamphlet, The Genius of Judaism. He wrote that the rabbis, "the dictators of human intellect", deceived the people and had them accept the Talmud, a "prodigious mass of contradictory opinions... casting their people into the bondage of ridiculous customs." He praised the Karaites, "these Jewish protestants... the most rational Jews." In 1842, Abraham Benisch also praised them. Similar ideas permeated the upper strata of Anglo-Jewish society, though their actual knowledge of Karaism was scant. Jakob Josef Petuchowski suggested these opinions reflected an old current, prevalent among the Western Sephardim, many of whom were descended from Crypto-Jews who overtly practised Christianity for generations and were unfamiliar with the Oral Torah. Haham David Nieto had to publish tracts in its defence over a century earlier.

Marks was deeply influenced by the "neo-Karaite" tendency. In Liverpool, he refused to read the Torah on the Second Day of Festivals, grounded only in rabbinic tradition. While there he met John Simon, whom he instructed in religious studies. Simon was acquainted with a group of members from the Mocatta and Goldsmid families, which complained over lack of decorum and was interested in praying together, rather than in separate Sephardi and Ashkenazi synagogues. On 15 April 1840, they seceded from their respective congregations, announcing their intent to establish a prayer group of neither German nor Portuguese" but "British Jews". They convened in Burton Street, London. With Simon's mediation, Marks was invited to serve as minister. He quit Seel and accepted his new appointment in March 1841.

Marks' convictions suited the secessionist mainly on the practical level – while exposed to the bibliocentric ideology, most constituents never cared about it greatly but were content to abolish the Second Day, which they regarded as burdensome. This was West London's greatest breach of tradition. In August, Marks issued the first tome of "Forms of Prayer", a new liturgy for his flock which reflected his ideology, the remaining four parts of which were published until 1843. The abolition of the Second Day and the new, heterodox rite alarmed the religious establishment: on 22 January 1842, a "Declaration" which served as an anathema for all practical purposes was released by Chief Rabbi Solomon Hirschell and Haham David Meldola.

Petuchowski stressed that, while the title "Reform" was sometimes conferred on the "British Jews" and some contacts between West London and the continental movement in the Hamburg Temple are attested to, they pursued a course which was its polar opposite. The German founding fathers of Reform Judaism regarded the Beatified Sages as innovative progressives who introduced the vernacular Aramaic into prayer, creating a precedent for German, and flexibly adjusted religious law, developing it further. Marks granted the Written Torah alone divine status, and refused to call himself rabbi but insisted on "reverend".

He even translated the Kaddish into Hebrew, viewing Aramaic prayer as a later rabbinic corruption. In his new prayerbook and Passover Haggadah, he excised or reinstated various elements contrary to rabbinic tradition: the blessing on the Four species was changed from "who hath ordreth to take a frond", identified as such only by the Sages, to "goodly trees, palm, boughs and willows" (as in Leviticus 23:40); the Ten Commandments were read every Sabbath, a practice abolished in Talmudic times; and the blessings on lighting Hanukkah candles and reading the Scroll of Esther during Purim were rescinded, as they were not ordered by God. Mentions of demons and angels, also derived from extra-biblical sources, were discarded. On the other hand, petitions for the coming of the Messiah, restoration of the sacrificial cult in Jerusalem and many others that continental Reform omitted, were never even considered an issue. However, Marks did not reject the Oral Law entirely. He emphasised that he did respect it to a degree, but as the work of mortal men, with no divine sanction.

Marks managed to receive a permit from Parliament to conduct wedding ceremonies, cementing his status as a religious leader. He delivered over 2,000 sermons in West London, where he served as lead Minister until retiring in 1895. Marks published four volumes of sermons (1851–85) and The Law is Light, a course of lectures on the Mosaic Law (1854). He contributed to a biography of Sir Francis Goldsmid (1879) and to Smith's Bible Dictionary. He served as professor of belles-lettres at Wigan College, Liverpool, and professor of Hebrew at University College London. He and his wife Cecilia Sarah (née Woolf; 15 July 1818 – 19 October 1882) were married on 14 December 1842. They had two daughters and four sons. One son, Harry Marks, was MP for the Isle of Thanet and proprietor and editor of the Financial News. Marks died at his home in Maidenhead on 3 May 1909 and was buried at Balls Pond Road Cemetery.

His unique approach to Judaism had little impact. Most congregants were little bothered. Two other nonconformist synagogues left the establishment: the Manchester Congregation of British Jews adopted his prayer book but refused to abolish Second Days. The Bradford Jewish Association did not even do that. Another small association, The Hebrew Reformed Congregation Beth Elohim on the Island of Saint Thomas, used his liturgy during its short existence, from 1867 to 1875. His successor in West London, Reverend Morris Joseph, did not follow his precepts. Marks' "neo-Karaism" perished with him. Eventually, under the influence of Claude Montefiore and especially after the installation of Hebrew Union College graduate Harold F. Reinhart in 1929, West London adopted mainstream Reform Judaism and in 1942 became a founding member of the Associated British Synagogues (Movement for Reform Judaism since 2005).
