= Nina Salaman =

British Jewish poet, translator, and social activist

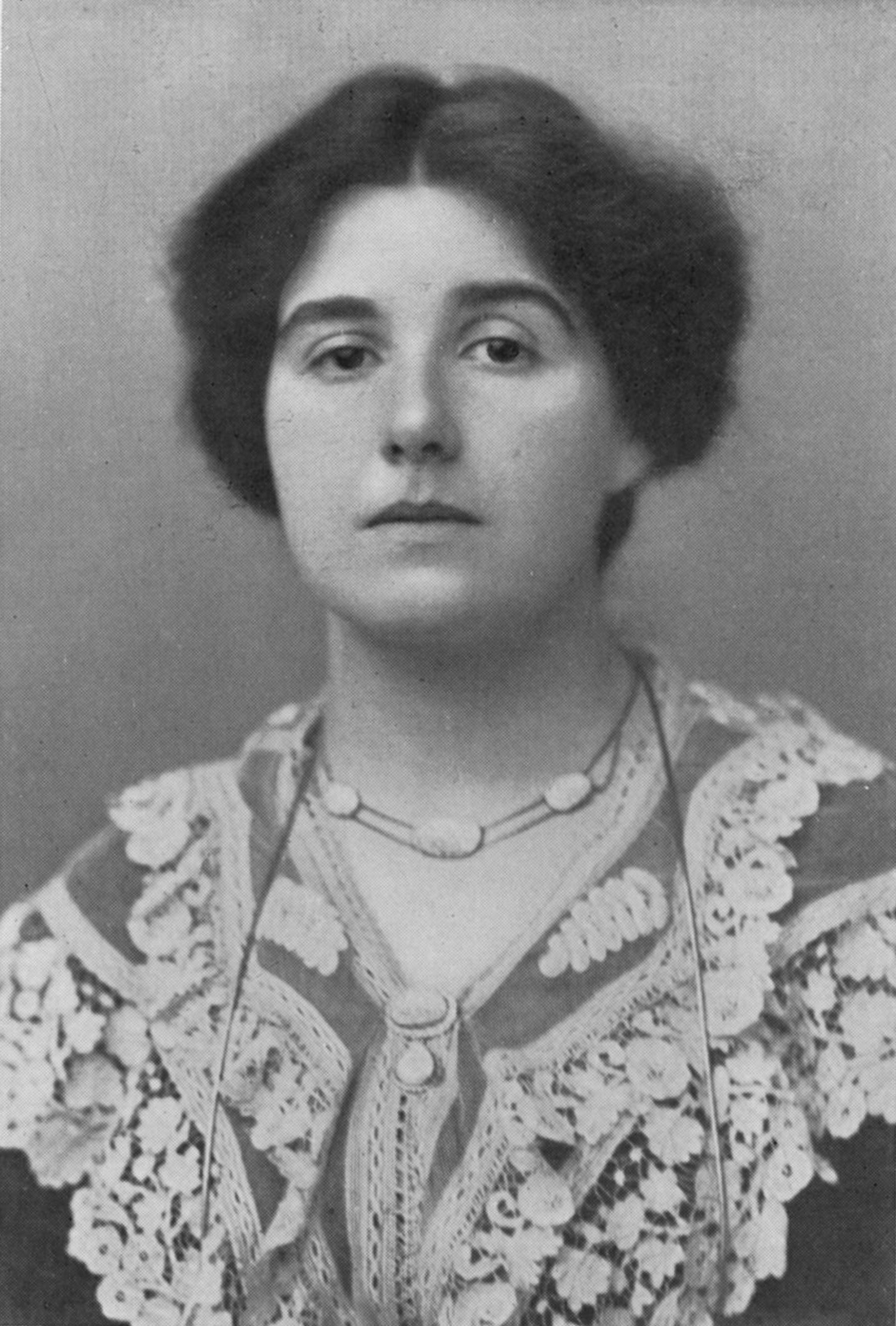
- Born: Pauline Ruth Davis; 15 July 1877; Derby, Derbyshire, England
- Died: 22 February 1925 (aged 47); Barley, Hertfordshire, England
- Resting place: Willesden Jewish Cemetery
- Occupations: Poet, translator, essayist
- Spouse: Redcliffe Salaman (m. 1901)
- Children: 6 (incl. Raphael Salaman and Ruth Collet)
- Writing career
- Language: English, Hebrew
- Notable works: Songs of Exile by Hebrew Poets (1901); The Voices of the Rivers (1910); Selected Poems of Jehudah Halevi (1924)

Pauline Ruth "Nina" Salaman (née Davis; 15 July 1877 – 22 February 1925) was a British Jewish poet, translator, and social activist. Aside from her original poetry, she is best known for her English translations of medieval Hebrew verse—especially of the poems of Judah Halevi—which she began publishing at the age of 16.

An advocate for women's education and suffrage, Salaman was a prominent member of the Jewish League for Woman Suffrage, the Federation of Women Zionists, and the Union of Jewish Women. She was the first woman to deliver a sermon in a British Orthodox synagogue and to be elected president of the Jewish Historical Society of England, though her declining health prevented her from taking office.

== Early life ==
Pauline Ruth Davis was born on 15 July 1877 at Friarfield House, Derby, the second of two children of Louisa (née Jonas) and Arthur Davis. Her father's family were Jewish precision instrument makers, who had immigrated to England from Bavaria in the early nineteenth century. A civil engineer by trade, Arthur Davis mastered the Hebrew language, becoming an accomplished Hebraist noted for his study of cantillation marks in the Tanakh. The family moved to Kilburn, London when Nina was six weeks old, later settling in Bayswater. Davis gave his daughters an intensive scholarly education in Hebrew and Jewish studies, and took them regularly to the synagogue.

The Davises moved in learned Jewish circles, and friends of Nina's parents included the families of Nathan Adler, Simeon Singer, Claude Montefiore, Solomon Schechter, Herbert Bentwich, and Elkan Adler. Arthur Davis was one of the "Kilburn Wanderers"—a group of Anglo-Jewish intellectuals that formed around Solomon Schechter in the 1880s—members of which took an interest in Nina's work and helped her find publishers for her writings.

== Career ==
=== Early career ===
Title page of Songs of Exile by Hebrew Poets (1901)

Nina's first published translation, of Abraham ibn Ezra's The Song of Chess, appeared in the Jewish Chronicle on 22 June 1894. Later that year, she contributed an essay and a poem on "The Ideal Minister of the Talmud" to the Jewish Quarterly Review, then under the editorship of Claude Montefiore and Israel Abrahams, and continued thereafter publishing translations of medieval Hebrew poetry in the Jewish press. Israel Zangwill, an acquaintance of her father, provided her with an introduction to Mayer Sulzberger of the Jewish Publication Society of America, which published her Songs of Exile by Hebrew Poets in 1901. The collection, which attracted widespread attention, included translations of poems by Judah Halevi, Abraham ibn Ezra, Eleazar ben Killir, Solomon ibn Gabirol, Joseph ben Samuel Bonfils, and Meir of Rothenburg, as well as passages from the Talmud and Midrash Rabba.

From about 1900, her father worked with Herbert M. Adler, nephew of Chief Rabbi Hermann Adler, on a multivolume edition of the Machzor with a new and modern translation. Nina and her sister, Elsie, both contributed to the work, devoting themselves to translating the metrical sections of the original into poetry, while their father rendered the prose. The festival prayer book was published as Service of the Synagogue in 1904–9, and became commonplace in synagogues across the English-speaking world.

=== Marriage and family ===
Nina met physician Redcliffe Salaman at the New West End Synagogue in July 1901, during Shabbat services. Redcliffe was one of the twelve children of Myer Salaman, a wealthy London ostrich feather merchant. His family had emigrated to England from Holland or the Rhineland in the eighteenth century. They were formally engaged ten days later and married on 23 October 1901, after which Redcliffe temporarily relocated to Berlin to complete advanced training in pathology. He was appointed director of the Pathological Institute at the London Hospital in 1902, but ceased to practice medicine the following year after developing pulmonary tuberculosis. The Salamans spent the winter of 1903–1904 in Montana-sur-Sierre and Montreux, Switzerland, where Redcliffe slowly regained some weight. Upon their return to England, they moved to a thirty-room Elizabethan country house, Homestall, in Barley, Hertfordshire, a small village near Cambridge.

Nina and Redcliffe Salaman lived comfortably in a kosher and Shabbat-observant home with numerous servants, and returned to London frequently to observe Jewish festivals and attend committee meetings. Nina and Redcliffe Salaman became active in the Jewish community at Cambridge, and entertained generations of Jewish students at their home. Nina travelled frequently to the town to use the university library and meet with Israel Abrahams, reader in Talmudic and rabbinic literature. Like her father before her, she personally educated her six children at their Hertfordshire home until they went to boarding school (at Clifton College and Bedales School), teaching her sons to read Hebrew before they learned to read English.

=== Later career ===
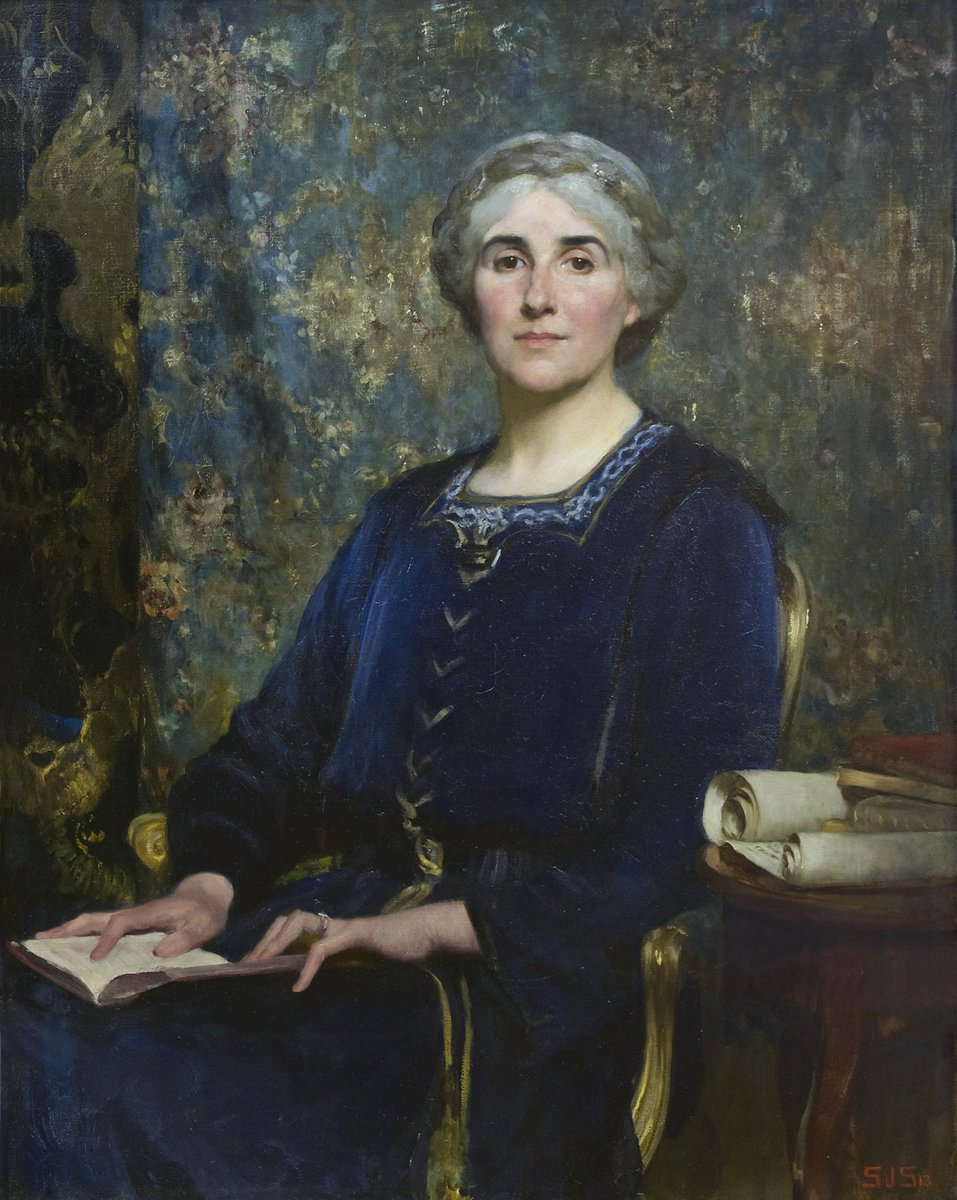
Portrait of Nina Salaman by Solomon J. Solomon (1918)

Salaman continued after her marriage to write in the columns of Jewish periodicals, including the Jewish Chronicle, the Jewish Quarterly Review, the Menorah Journal, and the Jewish Guardian. A passionate Jewish nationalist, Salaman published in 1916 one of the first English translations of Hatikvah, and later composed the marching song for the Judaeans, the Jewish regiment that participated in the British effort to seize Palestine from the Ottoman Empire during the First World War, in which her husband served as medical officer.

A book of original poetry appeared in 1910 to favourable reviews, entitled The Voices of the Rivers, which includes a hymn for the 9th of Av. The following year she released as a gift book for Jewish children Apples and Honey, a collection of poetry and prose by Benjamin Disraeli, Emma Lazarus, George Eliot, Israel Zangwill, Jessie Sampter, Leigh Hunt, Lord Byron, and others. Salaman's most important work was her Selected Poems of Jehudah Halevi, the second of a series of twenty-five volumes of Jewish Classics issued by the Jewish Publication Society. Released in 1924 after twelve years of preparation, the volume is divided into four sections (The Journey to Zion, Love and Bridal Songs, Poems of Friendship, and Devotional Poems) and contains an introduction by Salaman on the life of Halevi and his work. The translation was based on the Hebrew text from Chaim Brody's edition of Halevi, revised by him for the collection.

=== Activism and community work ===
Besides her scholarly work, Salaman served as vice-president of the Jewish League for Woman Suffrage, in which position she advocated for the right of women to vote in synagogue elections and for Hebrew education for Jewish girls, was an active member of the Federation of Women Zionists and the Union of Jewish Women, and helped establish the Tottenham Talmud Torah for Girls in North London, to which she donated the royalties of her books. She also participated in various non-Jewish charities, such as the Women's Institute at Barley. At Friday evening services on 5 December 1919, she became the first woman to deliver a sermon in a British Orthodox synagogue, when she spoke on the weekly parashah, Vayishlach, to the Cambridge Hebrew Congregation. The event was met with controversy; Chief Rabbi Joseph Hertz supported Salaman, and ruled that since she only went up to the bimah after the concluding prayer, no religious law had been violated.

Salaman was appointed to the council of the Jewish Historical Society of England in 1918, and was elected president in 1922. Her ailing health prevented her from taking office, however, and her husband was elected in her stead.

== Death and legacy ==
Nina Salaman died of colorectal cancer at Homestall on 22 February 1925, aged 47. The funeral was held three days later at the Willesden Jewish Cemetery, where the Chief Rabbi officiated and delivered a eulogy, customarily forbidden on Rosh Hodesh except at the funeral of an eminent scholar. An American memorial service was held by Ray Frank-Litman on 28 April, at which Moses Jung, Jacob Zeitlin and Abram L. Sachar made eulogistic remarks. Abraham Yahuda, Herbert M. Adler, Herbert Loewe, Sir Israel Gollancz, Israel Zangwill, Norman Bentwich, and others published tributes in her memory.

Salaman's children were Myer Head Salaman (1902–1994), pathologist and cancer researcher; Arthur Gabriel Salaman (1904–1964), general practitioner; Raphael Arthur Salaman (1906–1993), engineer; Ruth Isabelle Collet (1909–2001), painter and printmaker; and Esther Sarah Salaman (1914–2005), mezzo-soprano. A sixth child, Edward Michael, the twin brother of Arthur, died in 1913 at the age of nine. Salaman's granddaughter, Jenny Manson, is Chair of Jewish Voice for Labour. Another granddaughter, Nina Wedderburn (née Salaman; 1929–2020) was a medical researcher and married Labour politician Bill Wedderburn.

A portrait of Nina Salaman by Solomon J. Solomon was acquired by the Jewish Museum London in March 2007.

== Selected bibliography ==
- Salaman, Nina (1901). Songs of Exile by Hebrew Poets. London: The Jewish Historical Society of England, MacMillan.
- Service of the Synagogue, A New Edition of the Festival Prayers with an English Translation in Prose and Verse. Published under the Sanction of the Late Dr. Herman Adler, Chief Rabbi of the British Empire. London: George Routledge & Sons. 1906.
- Salaman, Nina (1910). The Voices of the Rivers. Cambridge: Bowes & Bowes.
- Salaman, Nina (1912). Jacob and Israel. Cambridge: Cambridge University Press.
- Salaman, Nina, ed. (1921). Apples and Honey: A Gift-Book for Jewish Boys and Girls. London: William Heinemann.
- Salaman, Nina (1923). Songs of Many Days. London: Elkin Mathews.
- Salaman, Nina (1924). Rahel Morpurgo and Contemporary Hebrew Poets in Italy. Sixth Arthur Davis Memorial Lecture. London: George Allen & Unwin.
- Salaman, Nina (1924). Selected Poems of Jehudah Halevi. Schiff Library of Jewish Classics. Philadelphia: Jewish Publication Society. hdl:2027/uva.x000883925.
