= Ellen G. Friedman =

American author, editor and professor

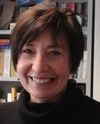
- Ellen G. Friedman
- Education: Queens College (M.A.); New York University (Ph.D.)
- Occupations: Author, Editor, and Professor of English and Women’s & Gender Studies at The College of New Jersey

Ellen G. Friedman is an American author, editor, and Professor of English and Women's & Gender Studies at The College of New Jersey where she serves as Coordinator of the Holocaust and Genocide Studies program. Friedman is on the Undergraduate, Graduate, and Honors Faculties. She is the advisor to The Women's Center. Her current research is in cultural and gender studies.

== Education ==
Friedman received her M.A. from Queens College and earned her Ph.D. in English with Distinction from New York University.

== Teaching ==
Friedman teaches undergraduate English courses on topics such as Modern American Literature; Contemporary American Fiction; Postmodern Fiction; Morality in Contemporary American Literature and Film; American Literature: 1860–1920; Women Writers; Representations of the Holocaust; and Literary Theory. Friedman also teaches undergraduate Women's & Gender Studies courses on topics such as Feminist Theories; Gender and Democracy; and a Senior Seminar: Postmemory & the Holocaust

Friedman also teaches select graduate courses & tutorials on topics such as Contemporary American Fiction Modern American Literature; Postmodern Fiction; Virginia Woolf; William Faulkner; Women Writers; Gender Trouble: Theory and Literature; Representations of the Holocaust; Feminist Literary Theory & 20th-century Women Writers; and Joyce Carol Oates

== Publications ==
Books:

- Issues of Gender. Co-edited with Jen Marshall. February, 2004.
- Morality USA. Co-authored with Corinne Squire. Minneapolis: U of Minnesota Press,1998.
- Creating an Inclusive College Curriculum: A Teaching Sourcebook From The New Jersey Project. With Charley Flint, Wendy Kolmar, and Paula Rothenberg. New York: Teacher's College Press. Athene Series, 1996. Principal editor and contributor.
- Utterly Other Discourse: The Texts of Christine Brooke-Rose. Normal, IL: Dalkey Archive Press,1995. With Richard Martin. Co-Editor and Contributor.
- Breaking the Sequence: Women’s Experimental Fiction with Miriam Fuchs. Princeton: Princeton UP, 1989. Co-editor and contributor.
- Joan Didion: Essays and Conversation. Princeton: Ontario Review P, 1984. Editor and contributor.
- Joyce Carol Oates. New York: Ungar, 1980. Paperback 1984.

Articles:

- “Sexing the Text: Women’s Experimental Fiction in the Twentieth Century.” Routledge Companion to Experimental Literature. Joe Bray, Alison Gibbons, and Brian McHale, Editors. London: Routledge, 2012: 154–67.
- “Kathy Acker: Wandering Jew.” Forward Kathy Acker: Transnationalism. Polina Mackay and Kathryn Nicol, eds. London: Cambridge Scholars Publishing, 2009: xi-xx.
- “Out-of-the-Box Education: An Innovative New Jersey Program Takes Women’s Studies Back to Elementary School.” Ms Magazine. October 2008.
- “Post-Patriarchal Endings: Some New American Fiction.” Modern Fiction Studies. 48 (fall 2002): 693–712.
- “ ‘Utterly Other Discourse’: The Anti-Canon of Women Experimental Writers from Dorothy Richardson to Christine Brooke-Rose.” Modern Fiction Studies (fall 1988): 353- 70.
- “Where Are the Missing Contents: (Post)Modernism, Gender, and the Canon.” PMLA, March 1993: 240–52.

== Panels, Conferences, Public Lectures, Interviews ==
- “Sexing the Text: Women’s Experimental Fiction in the Twentieth Century.” Invited Lecture. University of Turku, Finland. May 5, 2012
- “Bicycles and Chicken Farms: A Holocaust Story from The Seven. “ Visiting Scholar and Speaker at the Center for Biographical Research, University of Hawaii at Manoa. Oct. 13th, 2011.
- “Herstories—For kids: Training Teachers as Gender Thinkers.” Gender and Education Association International Conference. London, March 2009. Panelist.
- Interviewed by Australia National Public Radio. Invited to be interviewed in November 2004 by Carmel Howard at studio in New York City for national broadcast on morality and Joyce Carol Oates.
- “Is the Category Woman the Same as the Category ‘Frau’”? Keynote Speaker. Approaching America: European Views-Transatlantic Perspectives: International Symposium on the Occasion of the 20th Anniversary of the Center for North American Studies (ZENAF). Johann Wolfgang Goethe-Universitat. Frankfurt am Main, Germany. 21–22 January 2000.
- “Where Have All the Fathers Gone: Contemporary American Fiction.” Invited Lecture. W.E.B. Du Bois Lectures in American Studies. Humboldt-Universitat. Berlin, Germany. 25 January 2000.
- Panelist. C a.m. Canada Television, CTV. September 21, 1998. “Morality and the American Presidency.”
