= Helen Freeman (rabbi) =

British Reform Jewish rabbi

Rabbi Helen Freeman

Personal life
- Born: Croydon, London

Religious life
- Religion: Judaism
- Synagogue: West London Synagogue
- Position: Senior Rabbi

Helen Freeman (née Horn) is a British Reform Jewish rabbi. From 1999 to 2010 she was rabbi at West London Synagogue, was its principal rabbi from 2010 to 2020 and is now (jointly with David Mitchell) its senior rabbi. The daughter of a German-Jewish refugee, she was born in Croydon and was educated at Croydon High School. She was ordained as a rabbi in 1990 and was previously a speech therapist and a Jungian analyst.
