= Esther Salaman =

Russian-British physicist, literary critic, and writer (1900–1995)

- Born: Esther Polianowsky; 6 January 1900; Zhytomyr, Russian Empire
- Died: 9 November 1995 (aged 95); London, England
- Education: University of Berlin (1922–25); Cambridge University (1925–28)
- Spouse: Myer Salaman (m. 1924; died 1994)

Esther "Polly" Salaman (née Polianowsky) (Hebrew: אֶסְתֵּר פאָליאַנאָווסקי שָׂלָמָן, Russian: Эстер Поляновская Саламан; 6 January 1900 – 9 November 1995) was a Russian-born Jewish writer and physicist. She is best known for her memoir on Albert Einstein, her friend and teacher while studying at the University of Berlin.

== Biography ==
=== Early life ===
Esther Polianowsky was born in Zhytomyr to an observant Jewish timber merchant. In 1917, she was accepted to the Kiev University to study mathematics. As civil war and anti-Semitic pogroms spread across the Russian Empire, however, her father forbade her from leaving alone for Kiev.

Polianowsky fought in the Ukrainian national resistance during the Russian Civil War, thereupon escaping to Mandatory Palestine in January 1920 to join a group of pioneer agricultural workers. She succeeded in securing travel documents for her widowed mother and four siblings, and paid a team of Polish foresters to lead them to the Polish border in secret. From there, Esther guided them to Palestine.

=== Education ===
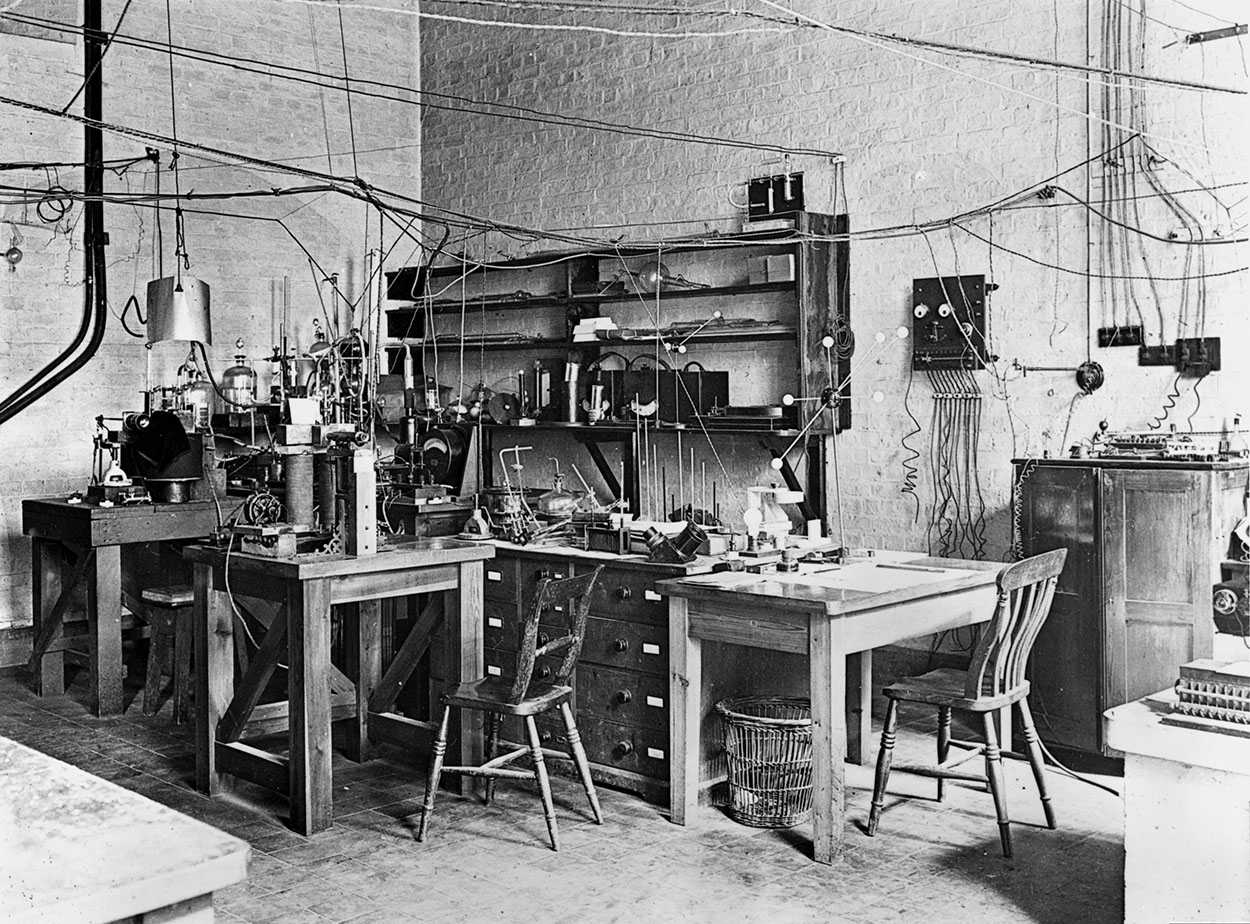
The Cavendish Laboratory in 1927

Despite the volatile situation for Jews in Germany, Esther and her sister Feyga (Fania) elected to relocate to Berlin in the summer of 1922 to resume their education. Polianowsky's application to the University of Berlin was sponsored by Albert Einstein, whose recommendation gained her admission to the Faculty of Physics, in spite of her not having completed an entrance examination. While his pupil, Polianowsky developed a personal relationship with Einstein. He encouraged her writing after reading her article in the Frankfurter Zeitung recalling the murderous pogroms in Zhytomyr by Petliura's Cossacks during Orthodox Christmas of 1918.

As the Nazi Party rose to prominence in Germany, Polianowsky was encouraged by Einstein to leave the country after graduation. He provided her with a recommendation to pursue doctoral work at the Cavendish Laboratory under Sir Ernest Rutherford. Her scholarship, funded by Jewish philanthropist Redcliffe Salaman, was conditioned on her later going to Israel to teach. Although this plan did not come to fruition, she grew close to the Salaman family and married Redcliffe's eldest son Myer, a pathologist. Polianowsky left the Cavendish in the summer of 1928, her PhD incomplete, to devote her life to her family.

=== Early career ===
At the suggestion of Ludwig Wittgenstein, Esther began writing fiction for an English audience. She published her first novel, Two Silver Roubles, in 1932, only six years after arriving in England knowing only Yiddish, Russian, German, and Hebrew.

From 1940, Myer and Esther Salaman shared a large home in Cambridge with their close friends Frances and Francis Cornford, along with their respective children. The Salamans had four children: Nina Wedderburn, Thalia Brenda Polak, Ruth Chattie Salaman and David Francis Salaman. When Myer joined the Royal Army Medical Corps in 1943, Esther and their children stayed on with the Cornfords. That same year, she and Frances together published an anthology of poems from the Russian, which included biographies of Kruykov, Pushkin, Blok, and Akhmatova.

The two families often retreated to Ringstead, Norfolk, where the Cornfords maintained a cottage attached to the Darwin family's six-storey Hunstanton Mill, constructed in 1850. From 1936 the Mill served as a debating retreat for the Theoretical Biology Club, a group of organicists and theoretical biologists that included John D. Bernal, Max Black, J. B. S. Haldane, Dorothy and Joseph Needham, Karl Popper, C. H. Waddington, Bertold Wiesner, Joseph H. Woodger, and Dorothy Wrinch. In 1956, Frances Cornford sold the property to the Salamans.

Salaman's reminiscences of Einstein were broadcast on the BBC Third Programme in 1955, and her second novel, The Fertile Plain, was published in 1956.

=== Later life ===
In 1948, Myer Salaman was hired as Director of the Cancer Research Department at the London Hospital Medical College and the family moved to London. Esther Salaman's later works include A Collection of Moments (1970), a study of involuntary memory, and The Great Confession (1973), which explores the use of memory by Aksakov, De Quincey, Tolstoy and Proust. She published memoirs of Albert Einstein and Paul Dirac in Encounter in 1979 and 1986 respectively.

She died on 9 November 1995 at the age of 95.

== Bibliography ==
- Salaman, Esther (1932). Two Silver Roubles. London: Macmillan.
- Cornford, Frances; Salaman, E. Polianowsky (1943). Poems from the Russian. London: Faber and Faber.
- Salaman, Esther (1956). The Fertile Plain. London: The Hogarth Press.
- Salaman, Esther (1970). A Collection of Moments: A Study of Involuntary Memories. New York: St. Martin's Press.
- Salaman, Esther (1973). The Great Confession: From Aksakov and De Quincey to Tolstoy and Proust. London: The Penguin Press. ISBN 9780713904598.
