= Morris Joseph =

Morris David Joseph (28 May 1848 – 17 April 1930) was a British rabbi.

Joseph studied at Jews' College, London, and in 1868 was appointed rabbi of the North London Synagogue; in 1874 he went to the Old Hebrew Congregation of Liverpool, where he officiated as preacher until 1882. He became the delegate senior minister of the West London Synagogue in 1893, when David Woolf Marks retired from active service. Joseph published a collection of sermons, The Ideal in Judaism, London, 1893, and a valuable popular work on Jewish theology, Judaism as Creed and Life, in 1903. His position on Jewish religious belief and practice was conservative, midway between Reform and strict Orthodox.

In 1872 he married Frances Amelia Henry, who was a great-granddaughter of Moses Samuel.
