= Barley, Hertfordshire =

Coordinates: 52.0272°N 0.0415°E

Barley
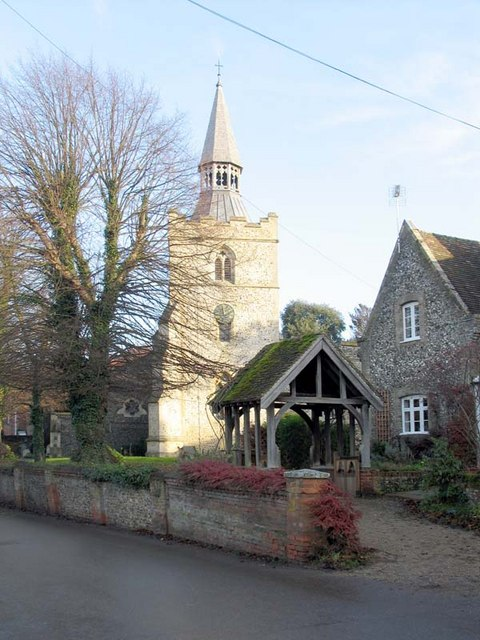
- St Margaret of Antioch, Barley

- Location within Hertfordshire
- Population: 703 (Parish, 2021)
- OS grid reference: TL400385
- District: North Hertfordshire
- Shire county: Hertfordshire
- Region: East
- Country: England
- Sovereign state: United Kingdom
- Post town: ROYSTON
- Postcode district: SG8
- Dialling code: 01763
- Police: Hertfordshire
- Fire: Hertfordshire
- Ambulance: East of England
- UK Parliament: North East Hertfordshire

Barley is a village and civil parish in the North Hertfordshire district of Hertfordshire, England. The place-name refers to a lea or meadow and not to the grain-producing plant. The Prime Meridian passes to the west of Barley, which is located on the Royston to Saffron Walden road, as well as the medieval London to Cambridge road.

== History ==
The area has been inhabited for perhaps 3,000 years; evidence has been found of Bronze Age settlers in the hills around Royston and Iron Age farmers to the north of the village in 100 BC, and Romans again occupied the parish.

Listed in the Domesday Book as Berlei, the name Barley derived not from the crop but from Beora's Ley, the woodland clearing of a Saxon Lord.

== Buildings ==
=== Church ===
Barley has a church with a 12th-century Norman tower, which is dedicated to St Margaret of Antioch. The church fell into a poor state of repair and was rebuilt in 1872 using designs by William Butterfield. Only the tower and three bays of the south arcade were retained from the original building.

=== Fox and Hounds ===
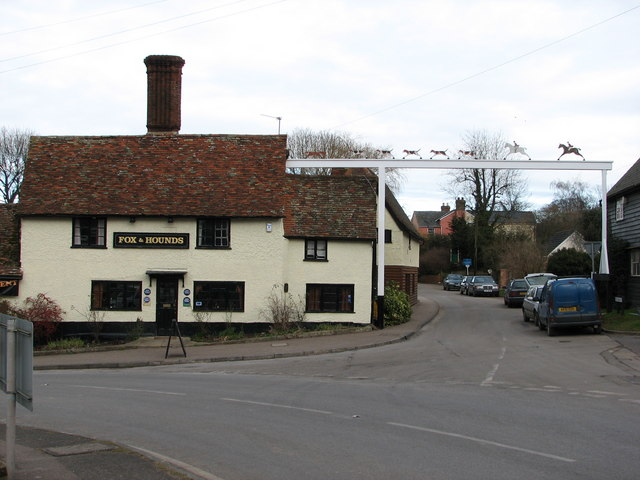
The Fox and Hounds with its distinctive sign

A well-known landmark in the village is the sign of the "Fox and Hounds" public house. On top of a beam are painted silhouette figures of huntsmen and hounds chasing a fox into the gable of the public houses at the top of Church End. Although it is a long-established feature of the village, the sign has not always been at its present site. In 1955 the Fox and Hounds, with its famous sign, was a pub located in the High Street, at the time part of an important route to London. In 1955 the Fox & Hounds burned down in a disastrous fire. The sign, which was partially saved, moved to its present site and the existing pub (the Wagon and Horses) was renamed. The pub and its sign are Grade II listed.

There are now two pubs in the village - the other being the Chequers.

=== Other buildings ===
The village also includes a 17th-century lock-up and an early Tudor town house with a large timbered upper room, which was mentioned by Daniel Defoe in a travel book in 1726.

A local eccentricity is to embed objects into the flint walls. The Manor has a row of dentures set into its flint wall at one point and a cherub at another, while one of the newer houses in the village has a small figure of the Buddha set into its wall.

== Facilities ==
Barley is home to Barley Church of England V.C. First School.

== Governance ==
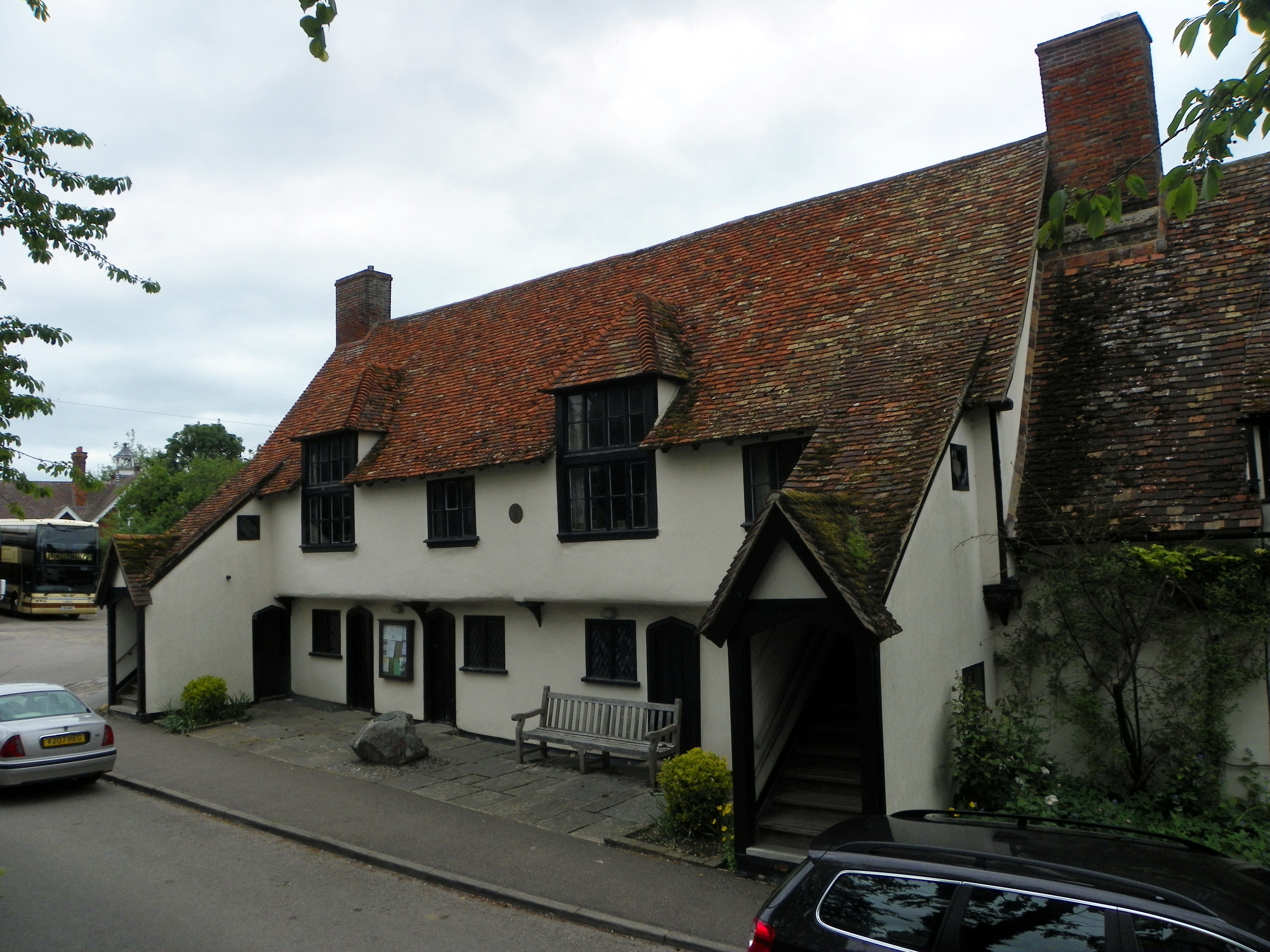
The Town House, Church End

Barley has three tiers of local government at parish, district and county level: Barley Parish Council, North Hertfordshire District Council, and Hertfordshire County Council. The parish council meets at the Town House.

Barley is an ancient parish, and it was part of the hundred of Edwinstree. Barley was included in the Royston Poor Law Union from 1835. The Local Government Act 1894 created parish and district councils. The parish of Barley was included in Ashwell Rural District from 28 December 1894, and Barley Parish Council came into being on 31 December 1894, taking over the secular functions of the parish vestry. Despite the name, Ashwell Rural District Council was based in the town of Royston. Ashwell Rural District was abolished in 1935, becoming part of Hitchin Rural District, which in turn was abolished in 1974, becoming part of North Hertfordshire.

== Population ==
At the 2021 census, the population of the parish was 703. The population had been 662 in 2011, and 659 in 2001.

== Notable people ==
Notable historical residents include William Warham, Redcliffe and Nina Salaman, the Reverend Charles Oswald Miles, curate in 1882–5, and Thomas Willett, future Mayor of New York; his house, Willet's Cottage, was demolished in 1972. Sam Smith worked in the local shop before the height of their fame. Actress Jaye Griffiths also lives in the village.

== See also ==
- The Hundred Parishes
