= Westminster Synagogue =

Synagogue in London, England

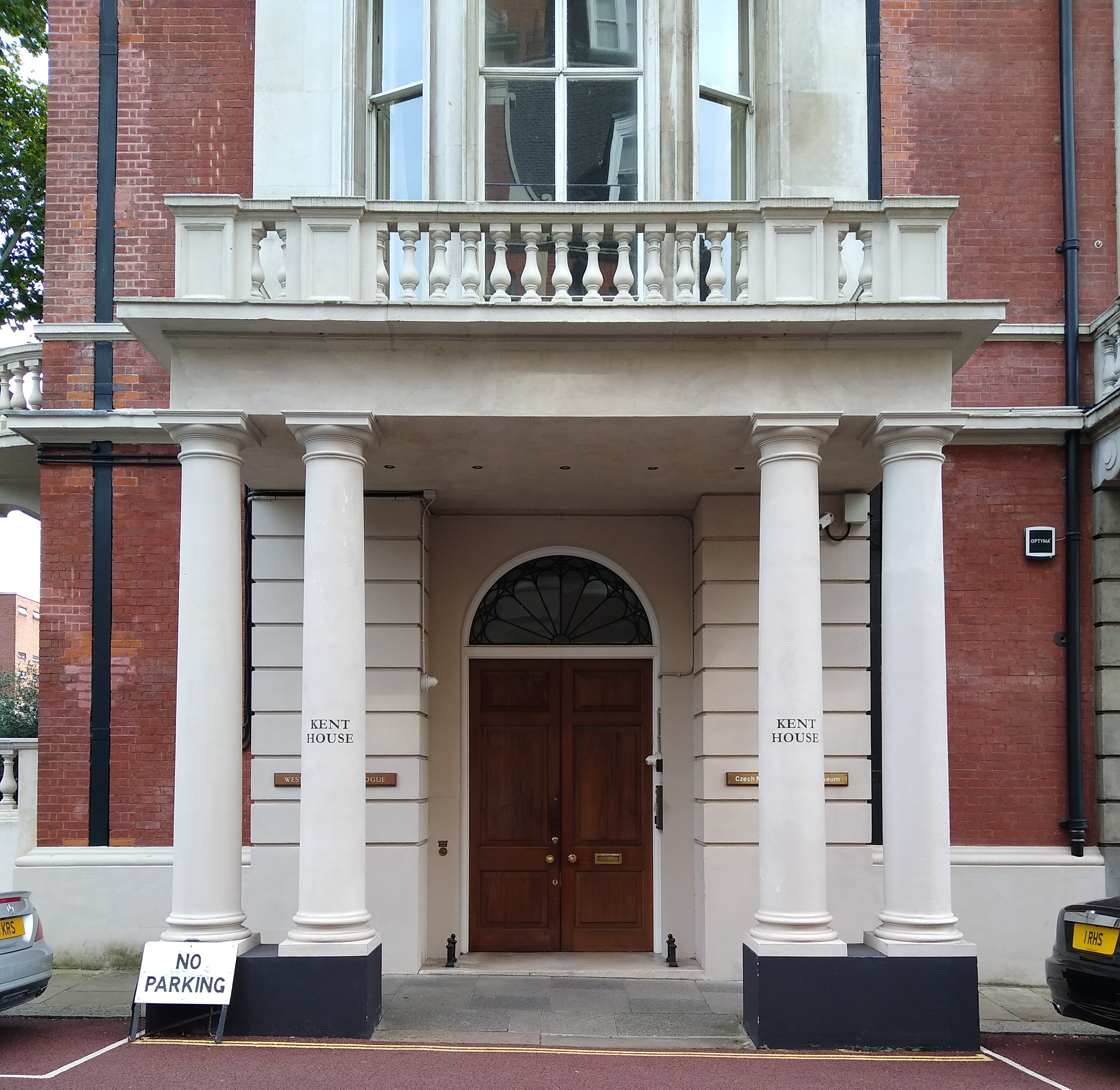
- Kent House, location of the Westminster Synagogue

- Location of the synagogues in Central London

Religion
- Affiliation: Independent - Progressive
- Ecclesiastical or organizational status: Synagogue
- Leadership: Rabbi Dr Kamila Kopřivová; Rabbi Dr Thomas Salamon (Emeritus)
- Status: Active

Location
- Location: Kent House, Rutland Gardens, Knightsbridge, Central London, England SW7 1BX
- Country: United Kingdom
- Interactive map of Westminster Synagogue
- Coordinates: 51°30′05″N 0°10′00″W

Architecture
- Type: Town house
- Style: Victorian architecture
- Founder: Rabbi Harold Reinhart
- Established: 1957 (as a congregation)
- Completed: 1874 (as Kent House); 1960 (as a synagogue)

Website
- westminstersynagogue.org

The Westminster Synagogue is an independent Progressive Jewish congregation and synagogue, located near Hyde Park, in Central London, England, in the United Kingdom. The synagogue is located in Kent House, a restored Victorian town house in Knightsbridge. The building, which dates from the late 1800s, also houses the Czech Memorial Scrolls Centre.

== History ==
The congregation was founded in 1957 by Rabbi Harold Reinhart, who resigned from his position as Senior Minister of the West London Synagogue and, accompanied by 80 former members of that synagogue, established the New London Jewish Congregation. Shortly afterwards it was renamed Westminster Synagogue.

The congregation's earliest services were held at Caxton Hall, Westminster, from whose location the synagogue derives its name. In 1960 the congregation acquired Kent House opposite Hyde Park in Knightsbridge. Kent House was built in 1872–4 for Louisa Baring, Lady Ashburton. In 1909, Sir Saxton Noble acquired the house: in 1959, his son sold the building, before it was acquired by the synagogue congregation. The building provided room for a synagogue, accommodation for congregational activities, and a flat for the rabbi.

Westminster Synagogue has, in religious terms, remained largely in tune with the Reform movement in Britain. Although not affiliated to the Movement for Reform Judaism, Westminster Synagogue is served by the Movement's Beit Din and has links with the West London Synagogue's burial facilities as well as strong links with Liberal Judaism. The congregation aims to give equality to all members, regardless of age, gender, sexuality or ethnicity.

== Clergy ==
The following individuals have served as rabbi of the congregation:

| Ordinal | Officeholder | Term start | Term end | Time in office | Notes |
|---|---|---|---|---|---|
| 1 | Harold Reinhart | 1957 | 1969 | 11–12 years | |
| 2 | Chaim Stern | c. 1969 | c. 1971 | 1–2 years | |
| 3 | Albert Friedlander | 1971 | 1997 | 25–26 years | Also Director of Rabbinical Studies at the Leo Baeck College |
| 4 | Dr Thomas Salamon | 1997 | 2017 | 19–20 years | Emeritus from 2017 |
| 5 | Benji Stanley | 2017 | 2025 | 8–9 years | Senior rabbi |
| 6 | Dr Kamila Kopřivová | June 8, 2023 | incumbent | 3 years, 52 days | Rabbi. She has also published her memoir |

== The community today ==
Westminster Synagogue is a warm and welcoming independent community, which allows its members to practise Judaism in their own way without criticism or judgment. Their members are culturally diverse and come from many countries. Whilst they may have come from a variety of Jewish backgrounds, in Westminster Synagogue they enjoy a Jewish life that combines traditional roots and a progressive approach.

A key feature of Westminster Synagogue is its founding principles. Their clarity and passion guided the synagogue’s rabbis – Harold Reinhart, Albert Friedlander, Thomas Salamon and Benji Stanley– throughout their ministries and serve to inspire Rabbi Kamila Kopřivová in her spiritual leadership of the community.

The community strives to be a hub of excellent Jewish learning; of participatory services with a passion for singing; of chesed, care, for the welfare of its members; of building meaningful relationships between its members and between Westminster Synagogue and the wider world. They foster these values through all they do, including Shabbat and Festival Services, Learning sessions for adults and children, cultural and social events, 1:1 connections and more.

There are many groups within the congregation for members to engage with, including Westminster Next Dor, for those in their 20s-30s; Oy Vey, We're Gay, for those who identify as queer and their allies; Chuliyot, for those who enjoy singing in and out of services; WS Czech Scrolls, for those who want to engage with the work of the Memorial Scrolls Trust; as well as Synagogue symposia, bridge clubs, book clubs, social outings and much more.

== Memorial Scrolls Trust ==
Westminster Synagogue has been closely involved with the Memorial Scrolls Trust, which holds and cares for a collection of scrolls collected from Jewish communities in Bohemia and Moravia during the Second World War by the Jewish Museum of Prague. This collection was acquired by Westminster Synagogue in 1964. A small museum on the third floor of Kent House displays the work of the Trust and tells the history of the scrolls. It is open for viewings by appointment, which members of the public can book via the Memorial Scrolls Trust's website.

On 4 February 2024, Westminster Synagogue celebrated the 60th anniversary of the scrolls' arrival at Kent House. The event brought together 56 scrolls and 275 individuals representing communities worldwide, including the Netherlands, the Czech Republic, Israel, Canada, the United Kingdom, America, and more. Notable attendees included the Czech and Slovak ambassadors, representatives from the Israeli and American Embassies, as well as the Lord Mayor of Westminster, nearby councillors, and rabbis from communities around the United Kingdom and the world.

== See also ==
- History of the Jews in England
- List of Jewish communities in the United Kingdom
- List of synagogues in the United Kingdom
