= West London Synagogue =

Grade II listed Reform synagogue in City of Westminster, London, England

- Hebrew: ק"ק שער ציון
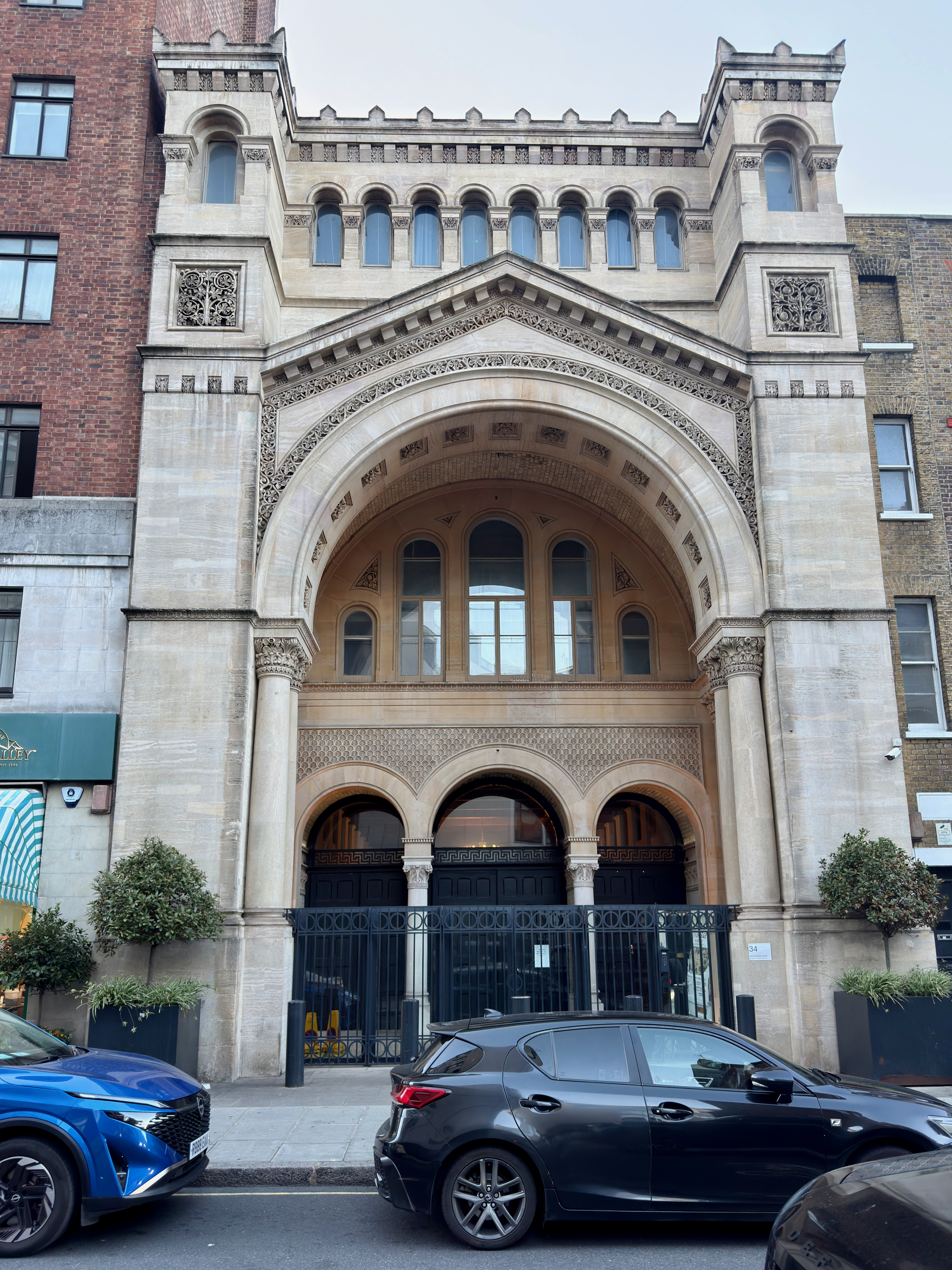
- The synagogue in 2026.

- Location of the synagogue in the City of Westminster

Religion
- Affiliation: Reform Judaism
- Ecclesiastical or organisational status: Synagogue
- Leadership: Rabbi Helen Freeman (Co-Senior); Rabbi David Mitchell (Co-Senior)
- Status: Active

Location
- Location: 34 Upper Berkeley Street, City of Westminster, London W1H 5AU
- Country: England, United Kingdom
- Coordinates: 51°30′55″N 0°09′44″W

Architecture
- Architects: Davis & Emmanuel (1870); Mewes & Davis (1934); Julian Sofaer (1964)
- Type: Synagogue architecture
- Style: Byzantine Revival
- Established: 1840 (as a congregation)
- Completed: 1870 (Upper Berkeley St); 1934 (Seymour Place)
- Construction cost: £20,000
- Capacity: 1,000 worshippers

Website
- wls.org.uk

Listed Building – Grade II
- Official name: West London Synagogue
- Designated: 7 September 1989
- Reference no.: 1247701

Audio description of the synagogue by Julia, Baroness Neuberger

The West London Synagogue, abbreviated WLS, and fully the West London Synagogue of British Jews (Hebrew: ק"ק שער ציון, romanized: Kahal Kadosh Sha'ar Tziyon, lit. 'Holy Congregation Gate of Zion') is a Reform Jewish congregation and synagogue, located near Marble Arch, at 34 Upper Berkeley Street, in the City of Westminster, in Central London, England, in the United Kingdom.

The congregation was established on 15 April 1840. The current synagogue building was dedicated in 1870, and was Grade II listed in 1989. It is one of the oldest synagogues in the United Kingdom and it was the oldest house of prayer affiliated with the Movement for Reform Judaism, before its affiliation lapsed in February 2023.

== History ==
=== 19th century ===
On 15 April 1840, 24 members of the Mocatta, Goldsmid and other families announced their secession from their respective congregations, the Sephardi Bevis Marks Synagogue and the Ashkenazi Great Synagogue of London, and their intention to form a prayer group for neither "German nor Portuguese" Jews but for "British Jews", which would allow them to worship together. The Mocattas and Goldsmids had been quarrelling with the wardens and complaining over lack of decorum for years. The new prayer group, convening in Burton Street, hired Reverend David Woolf Marks in March 1841. Marks and the congregation adopted a unique, bibliocentric approach often termed "neo-Karaism" by their critics, largely rejecting the authority of the Oral Torah. They abolished the second day of festivals and excised various prayers grounded in rabbinic tradition. It was only after almost a century that the congregation adopted mainstream Reform Judaism.

On 27 January 1842, the West London Synagogue of British Jews was consecrated in its first permanent building, at Burton Street Chapel. By 1848, it had become too crowded for the congregation. A new location was found, in Margaret Street, Cavendish Square, at a cost of £5,000. It was dedicated on 25 January 1849. In 1867, a new location was required again. Eventually, the current synagogue building in Upper Berkeley Street was opened on 22 September 1870. It cost £20,000 and had capacity for 1,000 congregants at the time.

Marks retired in 1895. His successor, Rabbi Morris Joseph, abandoned his predecessor's philosophy, which was never very popular with constituents, and brought West London closer to mainstream Reform by removing from the liturgy its petitions for the restoration of sacrifices in Jerusalem.

=== 20th and 21st centuries ===
Logo of the congregation

Since the 1920s, men and women have been able to sit together during West London Synagogue services. In 1929, the synagogue appointed Hebrew Union College graduate Rabbi Harold F. Reinhart, who brought it into the World Union for Progressive Judaism. In 1942, West London Synagogue was a founding member of the Associated British Synagogues (now called the Movement for Reform Judaism).

In 1957 Rabbi Reinhart resigned as Senior Minister and, accompanied by 80 former members of West London Synagogue, established the New London Synagogue which, shortly afterwards, was renamed Westminster Synagogue.

He was succeeded by Rabbi Werner van der Zyl, who served as Senior Rabbi from 1958 to 1968. Rabbi Hugo Gryn succeeded van der Zyl in 1968, until his death in 1996. Rabbi Julia Neuberger served as Senior Rabbi from 2011 to 2020.

In February 2020, after a long-running dispute with the Movement for Reform Judaism (MRJ), West London Synagogue suspended its membership of MRJ. In February 2023, the Synagogue's affiliation to MRJ lapsed after a prolonged period of disputed non-payment of fees to the MRJ.

=== Archives ===
The synagogue's archives, from 1841 to 1942, are held in the University of Southampton Libraries Special Collections.

== Beliefs ==
=== Marriage ===
The synagogue has an inclusive vision and celebrates both opposite-sex marriages and same-sex marriages.

== Clergy ==
The following individuals have served as senior rabbi of the congregation:

Ordinal	Office holder	Term start	Term end	Time in office	Notes
1	David Woolf Marks	March 1841	1893	51–52 years	
2	Morris Joseph	c. 1893	c. 1930	35–36 years	
3	Harold F. Reinhart	c. 1929	1957	27–28 years	
4	Werner van der Zyl	1958	1968	9–10 years	
5	Hugo Gryn	1968	18 August 1996	27–28 years	Died in office
6	Mark Winer	1998	2010	11–12 years	
7	Julia Neuberger DBE	March 2011	2020	8–9 years	Emerita since 2020
8	Helen Freeman	1 April 2020	incumbent	6 years, 191 days	
8	David Mitchell	1 April 2020	incumbent	6 years, 191 days	

== Ritual and edifice ==
Services at West London Synagogue follow the prayer books of the Movement for Reform Judaism, which incorporate material from both Sephardi and Ashkenazi traditions. A choir and organ, located behind a screen to the rear of the bimah, accompany the congregation in all musical parts of the service except for the aleinu and the Kaddish. Men and women sit together during services, and also play equal parts in leading them. Male worshippers are required to wear a kippah; females can wear one if they wish to do so.

The current building, dating from 1870, is located near Marble Arch in London. The main sanctuary was built in the Neo-Byzantine architectural style by Davis & Emmanuel. Its premises, which extend into Seymour Place, also contain offices, a library and various community facilities. The bimah and Torah ark were built in 1869–70 by Davis & Emmanuel. The synagogue's organ, built by Harrison & Harrison, was restored in 2008. It has 55 stops on four manuals and pedal.

== See also ==
- History of the Jews in England
- List of Jewish communities in the United Kingdom
- List of synagogues in the United Kingdom
