= Tony Bayfield =

British Reform rabbi (born 1946)

Rabbi Tony Bayfield CBE
- Born: Anthony Michael Bayfield; 1946 (age 79–80); Ilford, Essex (now in Greater London), UK
- Education: Royal Liberty Grammar School; Magdalene College, Cambridge; Leo Baeck College
- Occupations: Reform rabbi President of the Movement for Reform Judaism 2011–16
- Spouse: Linda Rose (died 2003) Jacqueline Fisher (m. 2021)
- Children: Three children, including Rabbi Miriam Berger

Anthony Michael "Tony" Bayfield CBE (born 1946) is a Reform rabbi and former President of the Movement for Reform Judaism, the second largest organisation of synagogues in Britain.

== Early life and education ==
Bayfield was born in 1946 in Ilford, Essex (now in Greater London), the elder son of Sheila (née Mann) and Ron Bayfield, a head teacher.

He was educated at the Royal Liberty Grammar School in Romford and Magdalene College, Cambridge. He studied law and had a doctoral place at the Cambridge Institute of Criminology and then moved to the Leo Baeck College to train as a rabbi. He received rabbinic ordination (semichah) in 1972 from rabbis John Rayner, Hugo Gryn and Louis Jacobs.

== Career ==
After ten years as a congregational rabbi at North West Surrey Synagogue, Bayfield became director of the Sternberg Centre for Judaism in Finchley in 1985. He was head of the Movement for Reform Judaism from 1994 (when the organisation was known as Reform Synagogues of Great Britain) until 2011. From 2011 to 2016 he was President of the organisation.

== Honours ==
Bayfield was appointed CBE in the 2011 New Year Honours List for services to Reform Judaism. London's National Portrait Gallery holds a photographic portrait of him by Don McCullin.

== Personal life ==
Tony Bayfield married Linda Rose, a teacher and Jewish educator in 1969; she died in 2003. In 2011, he met Jacqueline Fisher, whom he married in a small ceremony in June 2021.

Bayfield has three children including a son, Daniel, and an elder daughter, Lucy. His younger daughter, Miriam Berger, received semichah in July 2006 and is a respected rabbi in her own right.

Bayfield is a member of Finchley Reform Synagogue (FRS).

== Publications ==
Bayfield is a specialist in modern Jewish thought and contemporary Reform Judaism. He also specialises in Jewish-Christian and Jewish-Muslim dialogue and has published quite widely in this area. Bayfield has also written about Christian–Jewish reconciliation.

=== Works ===
- Prejudice (Jewish responses) (1973). London: Michael Goulston Educational Foundation
- Churban: The murder of the Jews of Europe (Jewish responses) (1981). London: Michael Goulston Educational Foundation ISBN 978-0-907372-00-4
- Sinai, Law and Responsible Autonomy: Reform Judaism and the Halakhic Tradition (1993). London: Reform Synagogues of Great Britain ISBN 978-0-947884-09-3
- (with Sidney Brichto and Eugene Fisher) He Kissed Him and They Wept: Towards a Theology of Jewish-Catholic Partnership (2001). London: SCM Press ISBN 978-0-334-02826-0
- (with Tony Brayfield and Marcus Braybrooke) Dialogue With a Difference: Manor House Group Experience (1992). London: SCM Press ISBN 978-0-334-01980-0
- "September 11: The Case Against Us All" in Roger Boase (ed.) Islam and Global Dialogue – Religious Pluralism and the Pursuit of Peace (2005), Farnham, Surrey: Ashgate Publishing ISBN 978-075465307-3
- (with Alan Race and Abdullah Siddiqui, eds.) Beyond the Dysfunctional Family: Jews, Christians and Muslims in Dialogue With Each Other and With Britain (2012) London: CreateSpace ISBN 978-1-468-16747-4
- Being Jewish Today – Confronting the Real Issues (2019). London: Bloomsbury Publishing ISBN 978-1-472962-08-9

== Sources ==
- The Movement for Reform Judaism: )
- The Guardian: )
