= Jonathan Wittenberg =

Scottish rabbi

Jonathan Wittenberg (born 17 September 1957 in Glasgow, Scotland) is a Masorti rabbi, the Senior Rabbi of Masorti Judaism UK. He is Rabbi Emeritus of the New North London Synagogue, with approximately 3,700 members. He is also a member of the Elijah Interfaith Institute Board of World Religious Leaders. He sometimes contributes Thought for the Day on the BBC Radio 4 Today programme.

== Personal life ==
He attended University College School and went to King's College, Cambridge and Leo Baeck College, where he was taught by Louis Jacobs.

He and his wife Nicola Solomon live in north London and have three children.

Wittenberg was appointed Officer of the Order of the British Empire (OBE) in the 2024 New Year Honours for services to the Jewish community and interfaith relations.

== Works ==
- Torah (1995)
- The Three Pillars of Judaism: A Search for Faith and Values (1997)
- The Laws of Life: A Guide to Traditional Jewish Practice at Times of Bereavement (1997)
- The Eternal Journey: Meditations of the Jewish Year (2003)
- The Silence of Dark Water: An Inner Journey (2008)
- Walking with the Light: From Frankfurt to Finchley (2013)
- My Dear Ones (2016)
- Things My Dog has Taught Me: About being a better human (2017)
- How Hassidim are at the forefront of Gender equality in Judaism
- 'Listening for God in Torah and Creation: A Weekly Encounter with Conscience and Soul (2023)
