= Gabriel Kanter-Webber =

British rabbi

Gabriel Kanter-Webber is a British rabbi, and the first openly autistic rabbi in the United Kingdom. He received semichah in summer 2022, after training at Leo Baeck College, and is rabbi of Brighton and Hove Progressive Synagogue, succeeding Rabbi Elizabeth Tikvah Sarah who retired in 2021. His arrival in Brighton was covered by local news.

He also serves as chaplain to the University of Sussex.

== Education and career ==
Kanter-Webber studied his undergraduate degree at the University of Sussex, during which time he was also headteacher of the Progressive Synagogue's cheder. After graduating from university, he spent a year as a youth worker for LJY-Netzer.

He previously sat on the Board of Deputies of British Jews. In 2015, Jewish News listed him as number 7 on their list of 25 young Jewish leaders to watch.

Kanter-Webber also officiated at Britain's first bar mitzvah for a non-binary teen and at the first Jewish burial in the city of York for 8 centuries.

His Leo Baeck College dissertation calls for abusive rabbis to have their rabbinic ordination taken away.

In 2022, he reported a Board of Deputies of British Jews member for making racist comments about Desmond Tutu, sparking a Board of Deputies investigation.

In 2025, he was reported to have "confronted" the chief executive of the Board of Deputies at a service in his synagogue.

A 2026 profile in The Jewish Chronicle described Kanter-Webber as "well to the left on the rabbinic spectrum" and someone with "the reputation of being a forthright speaker".

== Personal life ==
Kanter-Webber is married with two children.

== Publications ==
- The Antisemitic Rabbi Who Became a Priest: Well, maybe in Tablet
- Why Does God Get It Wrong? in European Judaism
- Thank You God For Not Making Me A Slave in Slavery-Free Communities (chapter written with Mia Hasenson-Gross)
- Bad Rabbis: Clergy Discipline in a Jewish Context in Law & Justice: the Christian Law Review
- Rallying with Racists in Vashti magazine
- The Pastor as Partisan: freedom of the pulpit in history and theory published by Wipf and Stock (2026)

== Links ==
- Brighton and Hove Progressive Synagogue
- Gabrielquotes, Rabbi Kanter-Webber's website
- Freedom of the Pulpit book website
