= Deborah Kahn-Harris =

21st century Rabbi and Principal of Leo Baeck College

Rabbi Deborah Kahn-Harris is the Principal of Leo Baeck College, a rabbinical seminary and centre for the training of teachers in Jewish education, based at the Sternberg Centre, Finchley, in the London Borough of Barnet. She was appointed to the post in September 2011. Kahn-Harris, a graduate of the college, is one of the first woman rabbis to lead a mainstream rabbinic seminary.

== Early life and education ==
Kahn-Harris was brought up in Houston, Texas, United States. She has a Bachelor of Arts degree in Art History from Mount Holyoke College, Massachusetts and a doctorate in biblical studies from the University of Sheffield.

== Career ==
Kahn-Harris was one of the members of the rabbinic staff at Sha'arei Tsedek North London Reform Synagogue and a lecturer at Leo Baeck College before her appointment as the college's principal.

== Personal life ==
She has both American and British citizenship and is married to the writer, lecturer, and music critic Keith Kahn-Harris, with whom she has two children.

== Publications ==
- "Midrash for the Masses: The Uses (and Abuses) of the Term ‘Midrash’ in Contemporary Feminist Discourse" in Feminist Theology, May 2013, vol. 21 no. 3, pp. 295-308
- "Weaning: Personal and Biblical Reflections" in Grushcow, Lisa J (ed): The Sacred Encounter: Jewish Perspectives on Sexuality, Central Conference of American Rabbis, 2014
- Polyamory and Reading the Book of Ruth, Lexington Books 2023
