= New London Synagogue =

Synagogue in Westminster, London, England

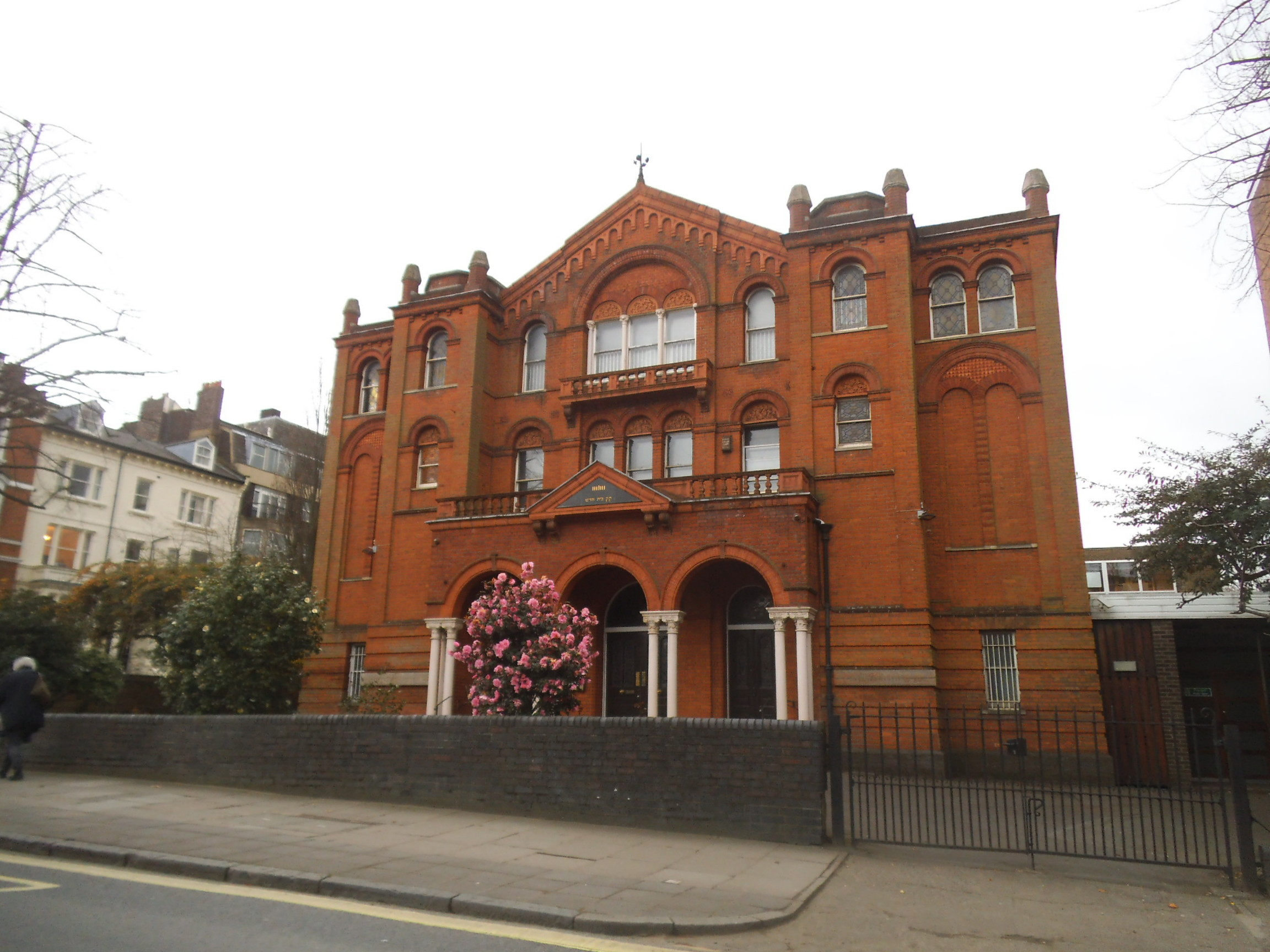
- The synagogue in 2015

- Location of the synagogue in the City of Westminster

Religion
- Affiliation: Conservative Judaism
- Rite: Masorti Judaism; Nusach Ashkenaz
- Ecclesiastical or organizational status: Synagogue
- Leadership: Jeremy Gordon; Natasha Mann
- Status: Active

Location
- Location: 33 Abbey Road, St John's Wood, London, England
- Country: United Kingdom
- Interactive map of New London Synagogue
- Coordinates: 51°32′09″N 0°10′44″W

Architecture
- Architect: H. H. Collins
- Type: Synagogue architecture
- Style: Italianate
- Founder: Louis Jacobs (as New London)
- Established: As congregations: 1880 (St John's Wood); 1964 (New London)
- Completed: 1882 (as St John's Wood Synagogue)
- Materials: Brick

Website
- newlondon.org.uk

Listed Building – Grade II
- Official name: New London Synagogue
- Designated: 7 September 1989
- Reference no.: 1247665

New London Synagogue is a Masorti Jewish congregation and synagogue in St John's Wood in London, England, in the United Kingdom.

The congregation was founded in 1964 by followers of Rabbi Louis Jacobs, following the "Jacobs Affair" in which Jacobs was refused employment in the United Synagogue due to alleged heresy. It is the founding synagogue of the Masorti movement in the United Kingdom, which was established in 1985. Its congregation is made up of approximately 500 households and worships in the Ashkenazi rite.

The rabbis are Jeremy Gordon and Natasha Mann.

== History ==
Louis Jacobs was an Orthodox pulpit rabbi at New West End Synagogue when he was offered an appointment as Principal of Jews' College in 1961. The then Chief Rabbi of the United Kingdom, Israel Brodie, interdicted the appointment "because of his [Jacobs's] published views". This was a reference to We Have Reason to Believe, a book Jacobs had published in 1954 in which he questioned the doctrine of Torah min hashamayim. The British newspaper, The Jewish Chronicle, took up the issue and turned it into a cause célèbre which was reported in the national press, including The Times.

[It was] an event that threatened to become the biggest schism in Anglo-Jewish history. The events in 1964 that came to be known as "the Jacobs Affair" dominated not just the Jewish media but the whole of Fleet Street and the newsrooms of both the BBC and ITN.

When Jacobs wished to return to his pulpit at the New West End Synagogue, Brodie vetoed his appointment. A number of members then left the New West End Synagogue to found the New London Synagogue.

The building at 33 Abbey Road had formerly belonged to the United Synagogue as an Orthodox synagogue. However, the congregation had closed and the building was being sold off for demolition and redevelopment. Supporters of Louis Jacobs secretly set up a shell company and purchased it from the United Synagogue without disclosing they intended to establish a congregation with Louis Jacobs as its rabbi. This congregation, the New London Synagogue, became the "parent" of the Masorti movement in the United Kingdom, which now numbers several congregations.

While holding the position of rabbi at the New London Synagogue, Jacobs was also for many years Lecturer in Talmud and Zohar at the Leo Baeck College, a rabbinical college preparing students to serve as Masorti, Reform and Liberal rabbis in the UK and Europe. Jacobs served as Chairman of the Academic Committee for some years.

== Architecture ==
H. H. Collin, the architect of the original building, also designed the Walworth Road Synagogue (1867), the Assembly Rooms in Yarmouth, Norfolk (1867), and the City Liberal Club, London (1875). New London Synagogue makes use of the structural cast-iron ‘railway station’ style, in the supporting columns, spandrels to the arches and gallery fronts; original pendant light fittings and a deep coved cornice.

The décor was redesigned in beige and brown by Misha Black, who also retained the classical timber Ark, now misleadingly painted white like stone, under a semi-circular archway. In the courtyard is a bronze Holocaust memorial by Naomi Black.

The building was listed Grade II by Historic England in 1989.

== Ritual and practices ==
Services at New London Synagogue follow the traditional Koren Sacks siddur. Weekly egalitarian services were introduced in 2005. Men and women sit together during services (within a tripartite seating structure), and play equal parts in leading them. Male worshippers are required to wear a kippah; females can wear one if they wish to do so.

Rabbi Jeremy Gordon has been a strong proponent of LGBTQ inclusion, and New London Synagogue offers same-sex couples marriages. Rabbi Natasha Mann, hired as a co-rabbi in 2019, is the first openly queer rabbi in a traditional Jewish denomination in Europe. Mann originally converted to Judaism through New London's conversion programme. She was ordained at the Ziegler School of Rabbinic Studies, which is affiliated to Conservative Judaism.

Services have a strong musical element, with "traditional choral classics by Lewandowski, Sulzer, Alman and Naumberg with more modern compositions by Shlomo Carlebach, Meir Finkelstein, Debbie Friedman and others as well as compositions created by Synagogue member, the composer Julian Dawes". Cantorial leadership is provided by David Djemal and Yoav Oved.

In response to the COVID-19 pandemic, New London Synagogue began to provide a "set and forget" livestream of services, including High Holy Days.

== Clergy ==
The following individuals have served as rabbi of the congregation:

Ordinal	Officeholder	Term started	Term ended	Time in office	Notes
1	Dr Louis Jacobs	1964	2000	35–36 years	
2	Chaim Weiner	2000	2005	4–5 years	
−	Reuven Hammer	2005	2007	1–2 years	Interim rabbi
3	Jeremy Gordon	2008	incumbent	17–18 years	
4	Natasha Mann	2019	incumbent	6–7 years	

== Membership data ==
In 1977, there were 514 male (or household) members and 136 female members of the congregation. By 1990, the number of members had increased to 714, comprising 410 households, 115 individual male and 189 individual female members. The number of members declined by 1996, to 604 members and to 500 members in 2010. By 2016, the congregation claimed to have 749 members (by household).

== Notable members ==
- Brian Epstein

== See also ==
- History of the Jews in England
- List of Jewish communities in the United Kingdom
- List of synagogues in the United Kingdom
