= Chronicles of Chaos (webzine) =

Heavy metal music webzine

- The Chronicles of Chaos homepage in 2015
- Website type: Music webzine
- Owner: Gino Filicetti
- Creators: Gino Filicetti and Adrian Bromley
- Website: chroniclesofchaos.com
- Commercial: No
- Registration: No
- Launched: August 1995; 31 years ago
- Current status: Inactive (since August 2015)

Chronicles of Chaos (shortened as CoC) was an extreme metal webzine. It focused on artists that are generally outside the metal mainstream, and occasionally covers other forms of extreme music as well. Online since August 1995, Chronicles of Chaos was one of the first webzines in the world for that genre of music. It has been a nonprofit publication since its inception. Chronicles of Chaos stopped publishing new articles in August 2015.

== History ==
=== 1995–2002 ===
Chronicles of Chaos was founded by Canadians Gino Filicetti and Adrian Bromley in August 1995, and started out in the shape of a monthly e-mail digest. According to the site's official history section, "Gino decided to start a different kind of e-zine that would strive to cut through the bullshit of the music community and provide fans with a true and unbiased opinion of current metal music." The first issue, Chronicles of Chaos #1, featured an 8 album reviews (donated by a friend of the zine), a re-cycled interview with Fear Factory by Bromley, a local band interview and a concert review.

Initially composed of four contributors from Canada and the USA in 1995, the staff eventually reached a stable set of nine writers in 1997, including the first European contributor. Near the year 2000, the European contingent was expanded by three new writers, with representatives from the Asian and African continents joining shortly after. This led to a core staff of twelve writers in 2002.

In this period, founder Filicetti retired from his role as contributor, while co-founder Bromley moved on to form his own print publication, Unrestrained!, with fellow CoC contributor Adam Wasylyk. Meanwhile, various other writers departed or became part-time contributors due to other engagements. Some of Chronicles of Chaos' writing staff became contributors to magazines like Metal Hammer, Terrorizer, Unrestrained! and more. As a result, the e-mail issues became less regular, with as much as three month gaps.

Between October 2002 and March 2003 the publication went on an unofficial hiatus for the only time in its history. Until 2003, the Chronicles of Chaos website served only as a static repository of plain text back issues, with the latest digest available for hypertext navigation.

=== 2003–2015 ===
From 2003 onwards, the publication became a daily updated webzine. Also established around this time was a search engine and archive, and a monthly "E-mail Digest". According to Filicetti, the "E-mail Digest" had 3,000 subscribers in 2007. The e-mail digest returned to its original monthly schedule, gathering up the articles published on the website during that month. More than 100 issues of the e-mail digest were published until 2011, containing over 20 megabytes of text.

As of 2007, Chronicles of Chaos had 16 staff writers, with contributors based in the US, UK, Romania, France, Norway, South Africa and Scotland. Most of its writers were native English speakers.

In 2007, Chronicles of Chaos was mentioned by sociologist Keith Kahn-Harris in his book on extreme metal.

On December 7, 2008, Chronicles of Chaos co-founder Adrian Bromley died due to pneumonia, in his sleep, aged 37. His death prompted numerous tributes within the music industry.

=== 2015–present ===
On August 12, 2015, marking the twentieth anniversary of the magazine, founder Gino Filicetti and co-editor Pedro Azevedo announced that Chronicles of Chaos had ceased publication of new articles. The reasons for this decision included much increased public access to streaming and downloading albums, as well as a dearth of new writers. The announcement was coupled with opinion articles from several of CoC's current and former writers.

Chronicles of Chaos remains online as an archive, containing over 7,500 reviews, interviews and opinion articles that were published during a span of twenty years.
