= Death of Zac Brettler =

2019 death of British teenager in London

Zachary Josh Brettler (20 September 2000 – 29 November 2019) was a British teenager who fell to his death in London on the early morning of 29 November 2019. He was recorded on CCTV briefly walking from end-to-end of, then leaping from, the balcony of a luxury Millbank riverside apartment owned by a Saudi princess and occupied by Verinder "Indian Dave" Sharma, a London gangster.

== Background ==
After Brettler's death, it was revealed that the 19-year-old had been living a double life. While born and raised in Maida Vale by prosperous British Jewish parents, Rachelle and Matthew, the grandson of a notable rabbi, Hugo Gryn, and educated at Mill Hill School, Brettler was living as "Zac Ismailov", son of a fictitious Russian billionaire oligarch, from whom Zac was poised to inherit US$270 million (equivalent to $340 million in 2025).

A pathologist stated that Brettler had a broken jaw, which could not be explained by the fall. While only Sharma was in the apartment when Brettler leapt from the balcony, businessman Akbar Shamji had been with them earlier in the night and returned to the apartment shortly after Brettler's death.

Akbar Shamji is well known as the co-founder and co-owner (along with his wife, Danielle Karnuts) of the fashion brand SAFiYAA.

== Investigation and inquest ==
The police interviewed both Sharma and Shamji multiple times about Brettler's death. Sharma replied "no comment" to almost all of their questions. Shamji was interviewed twice and his testimony contained many inconsistencies. By 2022, the investigation had stalled due in part to police errors, including not swabbing the apartment for blood and failing to press Shamji on why his car GPS did not match his testimony. At the December 2022 coroner's inquest, the court came back with an open verdict on Brettler's death, a verdict often recorded in cases of suicide where the intent (suicide versus accident) of the deceased could not be proved.

Sharma died in December 2020 of an overdose in his Riverwalk apartment after a previous suicide attempt less than a month before.

== Public interest and aftermath ==
The death is explored by author Patrick Radden Keefe in a 2024 article for The New Yorker, "A Teen's Fatal Plunge into the London Underworld" which generated worldwide attention. This interest led to multiple other articles, especially in London, written about the circumstances and people involved in Brettler's death. Shamji and his wife hired a PR firm to handle the fallout and shield her fashion house, SAFiYAA.

Keefe expanded his article into a book entitled London Falling: A Mysterious Death in a Gilded City and a Family's Search for Truth that was published in 2026, expanding on Brettler's all-consuming desire, from an early age, for wealth and its associated power.
