= Natasha Mann =

British Conservative rabbi

Rabbi Natasha Mann
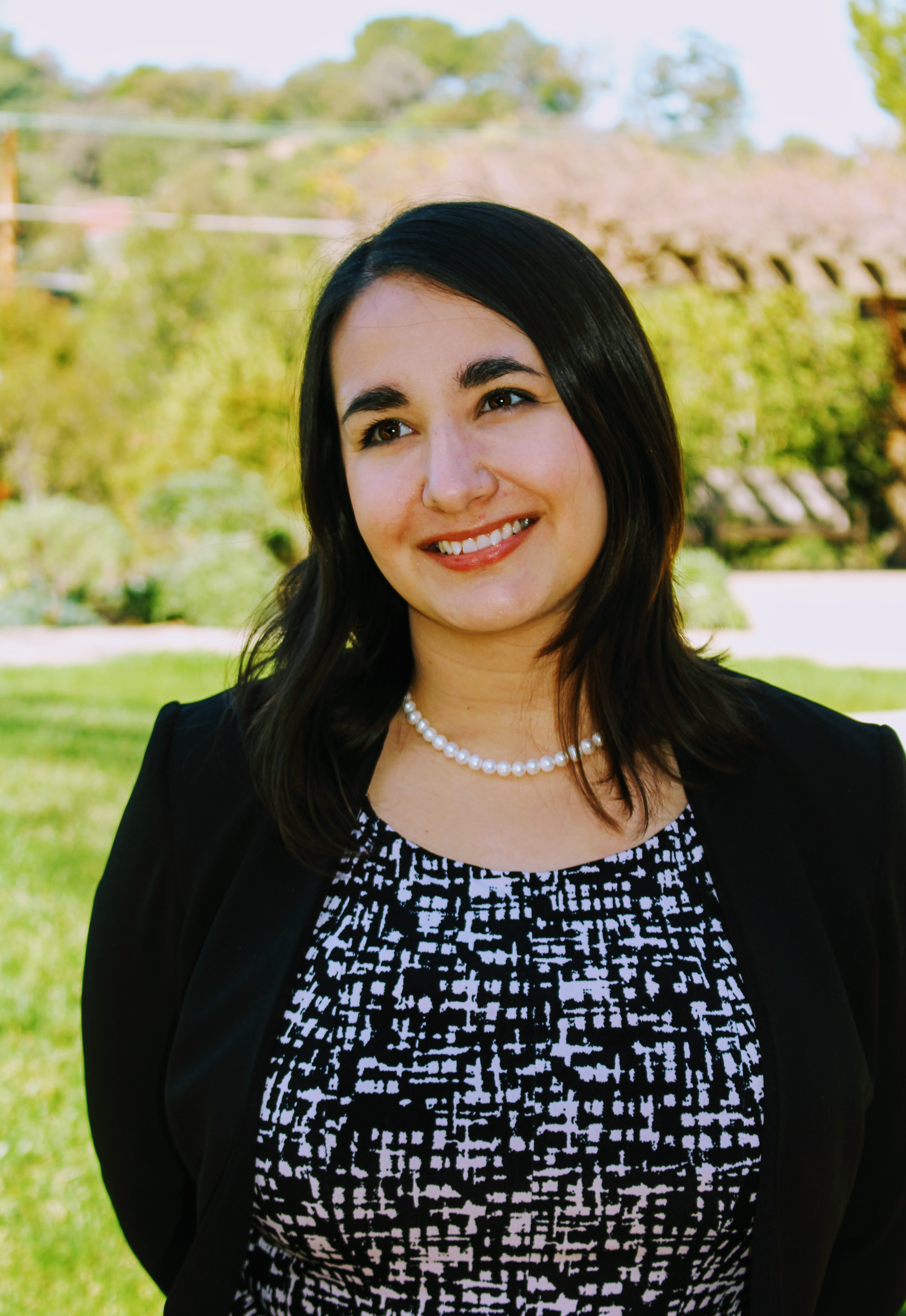
- Rabbi Natasha Mann

Personal life
- Born: 17 January 1991 (age 35) Hertfordshire, England
- Occupation: Rabbi and theologian

Religious life
- Religion: Judaism
- Denomination: Conservative Judaism

Jewish leader
- Predecessor: Rabbi Louis Jacobs
- Position: Rabbi
- Synagogue: New London Synagogue
- Began: 2019
- Residence: London, England
- Semikhah: Ziegler School of Rabbinic Studies

Rabbi Natasha Mann (born 17 January 1991) is a rabbi of New London Synagogue in the United Kingdom, which is affiliated to Masorti Judaism. She is the first openly queer rabbi in a traditional Jewish denomination in Europe.

== Biography ==
Rabbi Mann was born in Hertfordshire, England, to non-Jewish parents. Her mother is English and her father is Indian, her paternal grandparents are Muslim and Sikh. She began to take an interest in Judaism after Jewish ancestry was mentioned at a relative's funeral. Mann converted to Judaism at the age of 19 at New London Synagogue under Rabbi Jeremy Gordon. She obtained her undergraduate degree in Theology at Heythrop College, University of London.

Mann then attended the Ziegler School of Rabbinic Studies at the American Jewish University in Los Angeles, which is affiliated to Conservative Judaism. She also worked for AJU as a mashgiach, a kashrut supervisor, for two years. Rabbi Mann was ordained in 2019 by Rabbi Bradley Shavit Artson. At graduation, Mann was also awarded the Henry Fisher Award for Outstanding Achievement in Jewish Studies.

Masorti Judaism (known as Conservative Judaism in North America) is a Jewish religious movement that regards the authority of Jewish law and tradition as emanating primarily from the assent of the people and the community through the generations, more than from divine revelation. It therefore views Jewish law, or halakha, as both binding and subject to historical development. Masorti Judaism is the third-largest Jewish religious movement worldwide, estimated to represent close to 1.1 million people under the umbrella movement Masorti Olami.

At the time of her entering rabbinic school, the Masorti movement in the UK was not egalitarian and the only female Masorti/Conservative rabbi, Rabbi Daniella Kolodny, a United States citizen and the first female rabbi to serve in the United States Navy, was not employed by a congregation. Rabbi Mann and Rabbi Zahavit Shelev were the first British Jewish women to be ordained as rabbis in the Masorti movement. As a someone who identifies as mixed race, Rabbi Mann was also the Masorti movement's first rabbi of colour.

Rabbi Mann is also the first Masorti rabbi to identify as queer. Speaking at an international panel session of LGBT+ Masorti/Conservative rabbis, Rabbi Mann commented,

"I didn't go through what I think a lot of people going through, which is worry what would happen when they told their parents they weren't straight. ... I'm very accustomed to being in between spaces: I am a convert to Judaism, I am a mixed-race individual, and I date people regardless of what their gender is. I think I missed out on a lot of the angst to do with it."

Rabbi Mann is currently employed by New London Synagogue, the same synagogue through which she converted to Judaism and the founding synagogue of the Masorti movement in the UK in 1985. She also supports NOAM, the Masorti UK youth movement, and serves as rabbi to Hatch End Masorti Synagogue on a part-time basis.

During the COVID-19 pandemic, Mann co-authored the halachic teshuvah for the introduction of "set and forget" passive livestreaming of services on behalf of the Masorti movement in the UK. Traditional Jewish law forbids the use of technology on Shabbat and festivals. Mann argued, relying on previous rulings on abortion, that the emotional distress caused by isolation on Shabbat and festivals due to social distancing requirements, permitted leniency even around biblical laws.
