= Miriam Berger =

British Reform rabbi

Miriam Berger (née Bayfield) is a British Reform rabbi, who was senior rabbi of Finchley Reform Synagogue in London until she stepped down in 2024.

Berger grew up in London, the younger daughter of Rabbi Tony Bayfield, former chief executive and, later, president of the Movement for Reform Judaism and his wife, Linda (who died in 2003). She has a brother, Daniel, and an elder sister, Lucy.

She took a degree at the University of Bristol and studied at Hebrew Union College in Jerusalem before training for the rabbinate at Leo Baeck College in London. She was ordained as a rabbi in 2006.

In April 2020, during the COVID-19 pandemic, she criticised Britain's Health Secretary, Matt Hancock, for allowing relatives of people dying from COVID-19 to visit them in hospital and attend their funerals.

She and her husband Jonni, a tax consultant, and their son live in north London.
