= Brighton and Hove Progressive Synagogue =

Liberal synagogue in Hove, England

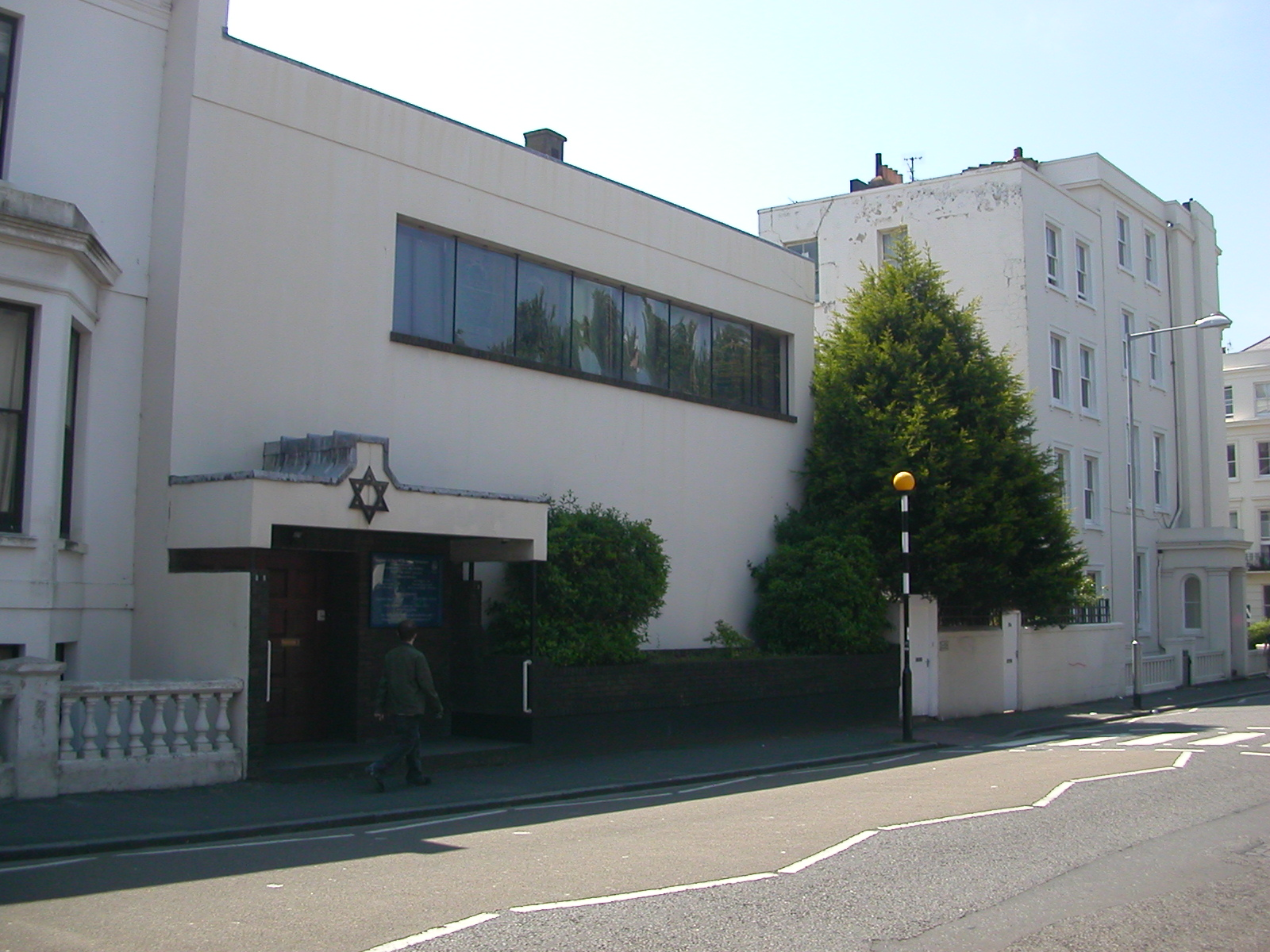
- The synagogue in 2007

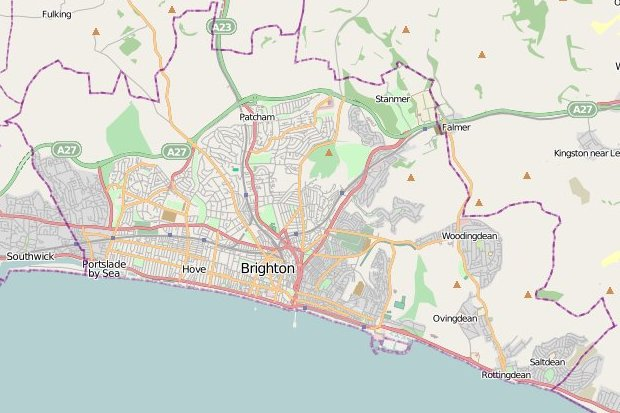
- Location of the synagogue in Brighton and Hove

Religion
- Affiliation: Reform Judaism
- Rite: Liberal Judaism
- Ecclesiastical or organisational status: Synagogue
- Leadership: Rabbi Gabriel Kanter-Webber
- Status: Active

Location
- Location: Lansdowne Road, Hove, Sussex, England BN3 1FF
- Country: United Kingdom
- Coordinates: 50°49′40″N 0°09′33″W

Architecture
- Established: 1935 (as a congregation)
- Completed: 1937

Website
- bhps-online.org

Brighton and Hove Progressive Synagogue, also known as Adat Shalom Verei’ut (Congregation of Peace and Friendship), is a Liberal Jewish congregation and synagogue, located in Hove, Sussex, England, in the United Kingdom. The congregation was established in 1935 and as of 2016 had more than 300 members.

== History ==
Elizabeth Tikvah Sarah (Rabbi Elli Sarah) was appointed as rabbi in 2000 and is now Rabbi Emeritus, having retired in 2021. Danny Rich, former chief executive of Liberal Judaism, was the interim rabbi after her retirement; Gabriel Kanter-Webber took up the rabbinical post on a permanent basis from summer 2022.

== See also ==
- History of the Jews in England
- List of Jewish communities in the United Kingdom
- List of synagogues in the United Kingdom

The logo of the congregation
