= Western Cemetery =

Western Cemetery may refer to:

- Vestre gravlund,
- Western Cemetery (Portland, Maine)
- Western Cemetery (Cardiff)
- Western Cemetery (Cheshunt)
- Western Cemetery (Dundee)
- Western Cemetery, Kingston upon Hull
