= Keith Kahn-Harris =

British sociologist

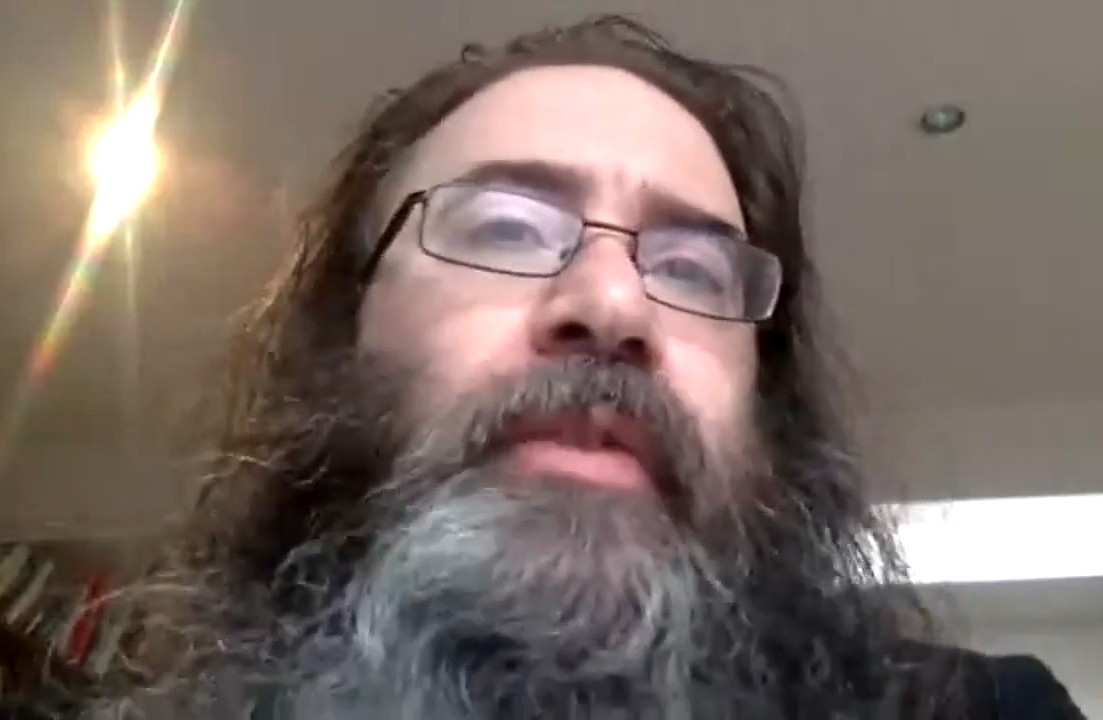
Kahn-Harris in 2020

Keith Kahn-Harris is a British sociologist and music critic. He is an honorary research fellow and senior lecturer at Birkbeck College, an associate fellow of the Institute for Jewish Policy Research, and a lecturer at Leo Baeck College.

== Education and career ==
Kahn-Harris was educated at Haberdashers' Aske's Boys' School, Elstree, at the same time as comedians Sacha Baron Cohen and Matt Lucas, and starred in a student review with Robert Webb whilst a student studying social and political science at Robinson College, Cambridge. He went on to graduate with MA and PhD degrees from Goldsmiths, University of London, and has since published academic and non-academic articles on Judaism, music scenes, heavy metal music, transgression, Israel, communities, dialogue, religion, ethnicity, political discourse, and denial.

== Academic positions ==
- 2008–09: Research Associate at the Centre for Urban and Community Research, Goldsmiths, University of London, working on project funded by the Economic and Social Research Council "Contemporary Anglo-Jewry and Leadership: Coping with Multiculturalism" (with Ben Gidley).
- 2007–08: Research Associate at the Centre for Urban and Community Research, Goldsmiths, working on two projects funded by the Rothschild Foundation Europe: "A Mapping Study of Efforts to Combat Antisemitism, Racism and Xenophobia at the Local, Communal and Grassroots Levels in Europe" (with Roger Hewitt) and "From Security to Insecurity?: Jewish Communal Leadership in Changing Times" (with Ben Gidley).
- 2005: Postdoctoral Fellow at the Advanced Cultural Studies Institute of Sweden, Campus Norrköping of Linköping University.
- 2001–02: "Jerusalem Fellow" at the Mandel School for Advanced Educational Leadership in Jerusalem.

== Personal life ==
He is married to Rabbi Deborah Kahn-Harris, with whom he has two children.

== Select bibliography ==
=== Books written ===
- The Beautiful Death of Ozzy Osbourne: How Metal Teaches Us to Live, HarperNorth, 2026
- The Babel Message: A Love Letter to Language Icon Books, 2021
- Strange Hate: Anti-semitism, racism, and the Limits of Diversity Repeater books, 2019
  - Review, by Howard Cooper The Jewish Chronicle, 18 June 2020
- Denial: The Unspeakable Truth, Notting Hill Editions, 2018
- Uncivil War: The Israel Conflict in the Jewish Community, David Paul Books, 2014
  - Review by C Schindler, Jewish Journal of Sociology 56 (2014) 127–128.
- All that Matters: Judaism, Hodder Education, 2012
- (co-written with Ben Gidley), Turbulent Times: The British Jewish Community Today Continuum 2010
- Extreme Metal: Music and Culture on the Edge Berg 2007
  - Review:

=== Books edited ===
- (co-edited with Dougald Hine) Despatches from the Invisible Revolution New Public Thinking 2012
- (co-edited with Andy Bennett) After subculture: Critical studies in contemporary youth culture Basingstoke Palgrave 2004

=== Refereed articles in scholarly journals ===
- "Religious Popular Music: Between the Instrumental, Transcendent and Transgressive" in Temenos: Nordic Journal of Comparative Religion, 48/1, 87–106 2012
- (With Ben Gidley) "Contemporary Anglo-Jewish and Community Leadership: Coping with Multiculturalism", British Journal of Sociology 63/1 2012
- "Creating Jewish Rap: From Parody to Syncretism" in transversal – Zeitschrift für Jüdische Studien 1 2009 21–38
- "The 'Failure' of Youth Culture: Music, Politics and Reflexivity in the Black Metal Scene" in European Journal of Cultural Studies, 7/1 2004, pp 95–111
- "'Roots'?: The Relationship Between the Global and the Local Within the Global Extreme Metal Scene" in Popular Music 19/1, 2000, pp 13–30

=== Journal special issues ===
- (Co-edited with Titus Hjelm and Mark LeVine) "Heavy Metal: Controversies and Countercultures" Popular Music History 6: 1/2, April/August 2012
- (Co-edited with Karl Spracklen and Andy R. Brown) "Metal Studies: Cultural Research in the Heavy Metal Scene" Journal for Cultural Research 15: 3, July 2011
