= Harry Jacobi =

British Liberal rabbi

Rabbi Harry Jacobi MBE
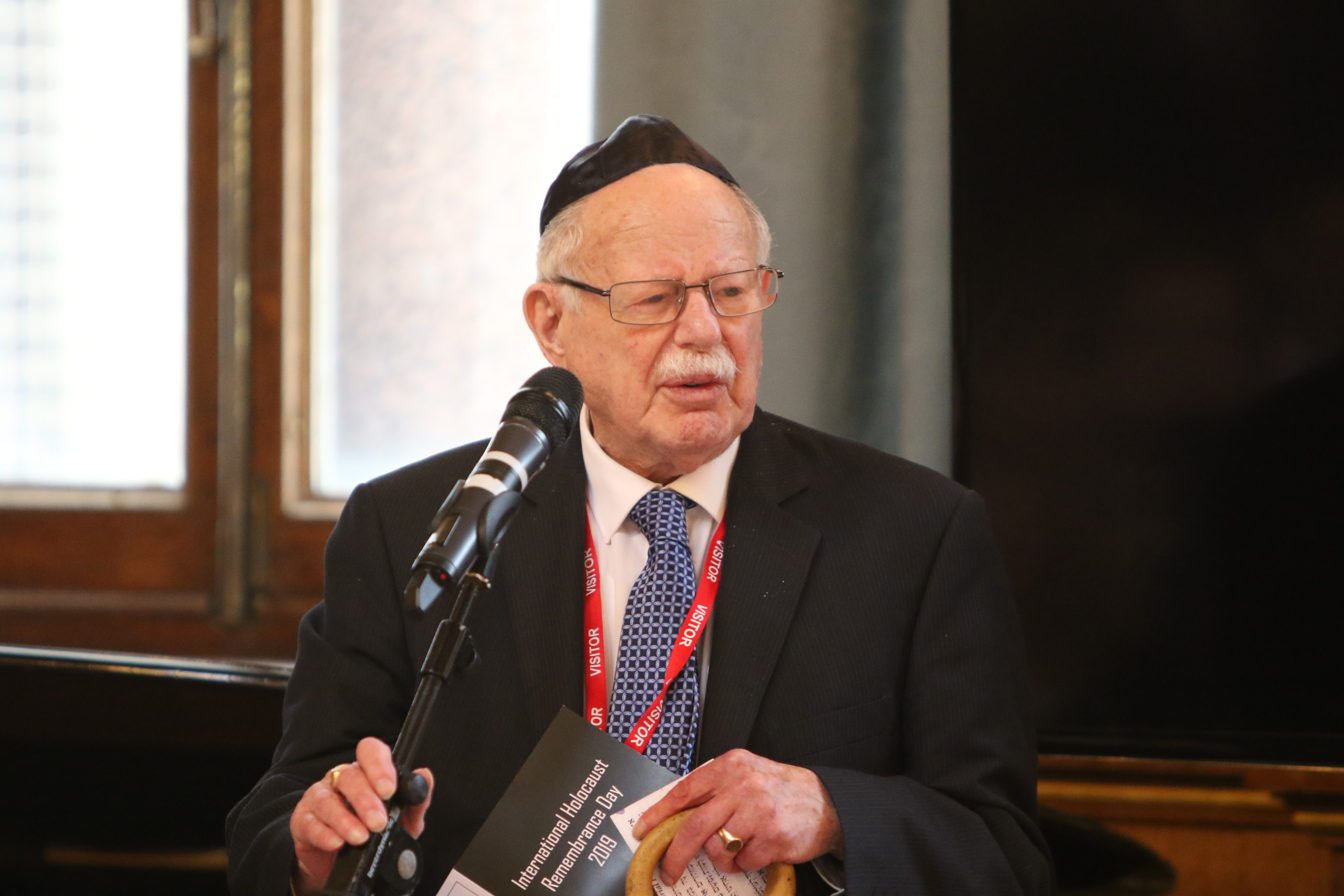
- Rabbi Jacobi in January 2019

Personal life
- Born: Heinz Martin Hirschberg; 19 October 1925 Berlin
- Died: 24 April 2019 (aged 93)
- Spouse: Rose Solomon
- Children: Margaret, Richard and David
- Parent(s): Margarete (née Jacobi) and Eugene Hirschberg
- Occupation: Rabbi

Religious life
- Religion: Judaism
- Denomination: Liberal Judaism
- Synagogue: Southgate Progressive Synagogue (1956–1975); Wembley Liberal Synagogue (1975–1982)
- Organisation: Liberal Judaism
- Semikhah: 1971

Rabbi Harry Martin Jacobi (19 October 1925 – 24 April 2019) was a rabbi in the United Kingdom, where he came in 1939, via The Netherlands, as a refugee from Nazi Germany. He has been described as "a formative figure in the founding and growth of Liberal Judaism in the UK and Europe".

== Early life and education ==
Born Heinz Martin Hirschberg in Berlin on 19 October 1925, his parents were Margarete (nee Jacobi) and Eugene Hirschberg. At the age of five, when his parents divorced, he moved with his mother to Auerbach, a town in the Vogtlandkreis, Saxony, Germany. He and his mother later returned to Berlin, where he attended the Theodor Herzl Schule and received his bar mitzvah at Friedenstempel in Halensee, Berlin in 1938, only a few weeks before the synagogue was destroyed on Kristallnacht. In February 1939 he travelled to The Netherlands and in May 1940 to the United Kingdom, as a refugee from Nazi Germany.

He worked as a motor mechanic in Manchester and, after service in post-war Europe with the Jewish Brigade, returned to Amsterdam in 1949 to work for his uncle, later returning to the UK. Inspired by Rabbi Leo Baeck and by Lily Montagu, who founded Liberal Judaism, he studied for the rabbinate at Leo Baeck College in London and was ordained in 1971.

== Professional life ==
He was a student rabbi at Southgate Progressive Synagogue in 1956, and became its Rabbi in 1971, serving until 1975.

As Rabbi, Jacobi served the congregations of Wembley & District Liberal Synagogue (now Mosaic Liberal Synagogue) from 1975 to 1982, and the Progressive Jewish congregation of Zürich, Switzerland from 1982 to 1990. He and his wife returned in 1990 to the UK, where he served as Rabbi at the South Bucks Jewish Community from 1990 to 1995 and the Eastbourne Progressive Jewish Congregation from 2004 to 2007.

When he retired from service as a congregational rabbi, he became chair of the Liberal Beth Din.

== Personal life ==
In 1957, he married Rose Solomon (d. 2014). They had three children – Margaret (who became Rabbi of Birmingham Progressive Synagogue), Richard (who became Rabbi at East London & Essex Liberal Synagogue) and David (a research scientist, who died in 2016).

== Honours and awards ==
In recognition of his services to the Jewish community, he was appointed MBE in 2006.
