= Michal Friedlander =

American museum curator

- Born: New York City, United States
- Occupation: Museum Curator
- Writing career
- Years active: 1991–present

Michal Friedlander is a cultural historian and museum curator. She has been Curator of Judaica and Applied Arts at the Jewish Museum Berlin since 2001, developing the museum collections and curating exhibitions, both as a co-curator and alone (see below).

== Early life ==
Friedlander is one of three daughters of the rabbi Albert Friedlander and his wife Evelyn, and although born in New York City grew up in the United Kingdom.

== Education and career ==
Friedlander studied Oriental Studies (classical and modern Hebrew, Aramaic) at Churchill College, Cambridge, graduating with a MA (Cantab.) degree. A specialist in the Applied Arts, much of her work focuses on the history and culture of German Jews and on the relationship between material culture and identity. Friedlander has worked in museums in New York City, Los Angeles and Berkeley, curating numerous exhibitions and publishing on a variety of Jewish themes.

== Selected exhibitions ==
- The Whole Truth – Everything you always wanted to know about Jews, Jewish Museum Berlin, 2013
- Tonalities: Jewish women ceramicists from Germany after 1933, Jewish Museum Berlin, 2013
- Kosher & Co. – On Food and Religion, Jewish Museum Berlin, 2009
- Chrismukka – Stories of Christmas and Hanukka (aka Weihnukka), Jewish Museum Berlin, 2005
- 10 + 5 = G-d – The Power of Signs and Numbers, Jewish Museum Berlin, 2004
- Souvenirs from Israel, 1948-1998, Judah L Magnes Museum, Berkeley, CA, 1998
- Jewish Pictorial Carpets from the Anton Felton Collection, London, Judah L Magnes Museum, Berkeley, CA, 1997
- Forging an identity: The Art of the Yemenite Silversmith, Judah L Magnes Museum, Berkeley, CA, 1996
- Blood on the Doorstep – The AIDS mezuzah, Judah L Magnes Museum, Berkeley CA, World AIDS Day, 1 December 1996.

== Selected publications ==
- "The Iron Shield of David: The First World War and the creation of German Jewish markers of patriotism and memory" in Gideon Reuveni et al., (ed.), The Jewish Experience of the First World War, London, Palgrave Macmillan, 2019
- Jüdische Allgemeine article, 2018
- "Vasen statt Milchflaschen – Eva Samuel, Hedwig Grossmann und Hanna Charag-Zuntz: die Töpferpionierinnen in Palästina, nach 1932" in exh. cat. Avantgarde für den Alltag, Berlin: Bröhan-Museum, 2013
- "The skeptical God-seeker" in R. B. Kitaj (1932-2007) - The Retrospective, Cologne: Kerber Verlag, 2012
- Kosher & Co. – On Food and Religion, (co-editor and contributor) Nicolai Verlag 2009
- "Beyond the River - Longing, ambivalence and the Jewish picture of Babylon" in Babylon Mythos und Wahrheit, Pergamonmuseum, Berlin, 2008
- "Maccabee® - The branding of a Jewish Hero," Weihnukka/Chrismukka, Nicolai Verlag, 2005
- "10 + 5 = G-d" – The Power of Signs and Numbers (co-editor, contributor) Cologne, DuMont Verlag, 2004
- "Liturgie in der jüdischen Tradition" in Petra Werner ed., exh. cat. Jüdische Handschriften. Restaurieren. Bewahren. Präsentieren. Teil 1: Jüdische Kultur im Spiegel der Berliner Sammlung, Berlin: Staatsbibliothek Preußischer Kulturbesitz, 2002
- "Women in Jewish Ritual Art" in Carolyn Hessel, ed., Blessed is the Daughter, USA: Schreiber Publishing, Inc., 1999
- "Village Jews, The Example of Ichenhausen, München" : Haus der Bayer. Geschichte, 1991
