= Western Cemetery (Cheshunt) =

Jewish cemetery in Cheshunt, Hertfordshire, England

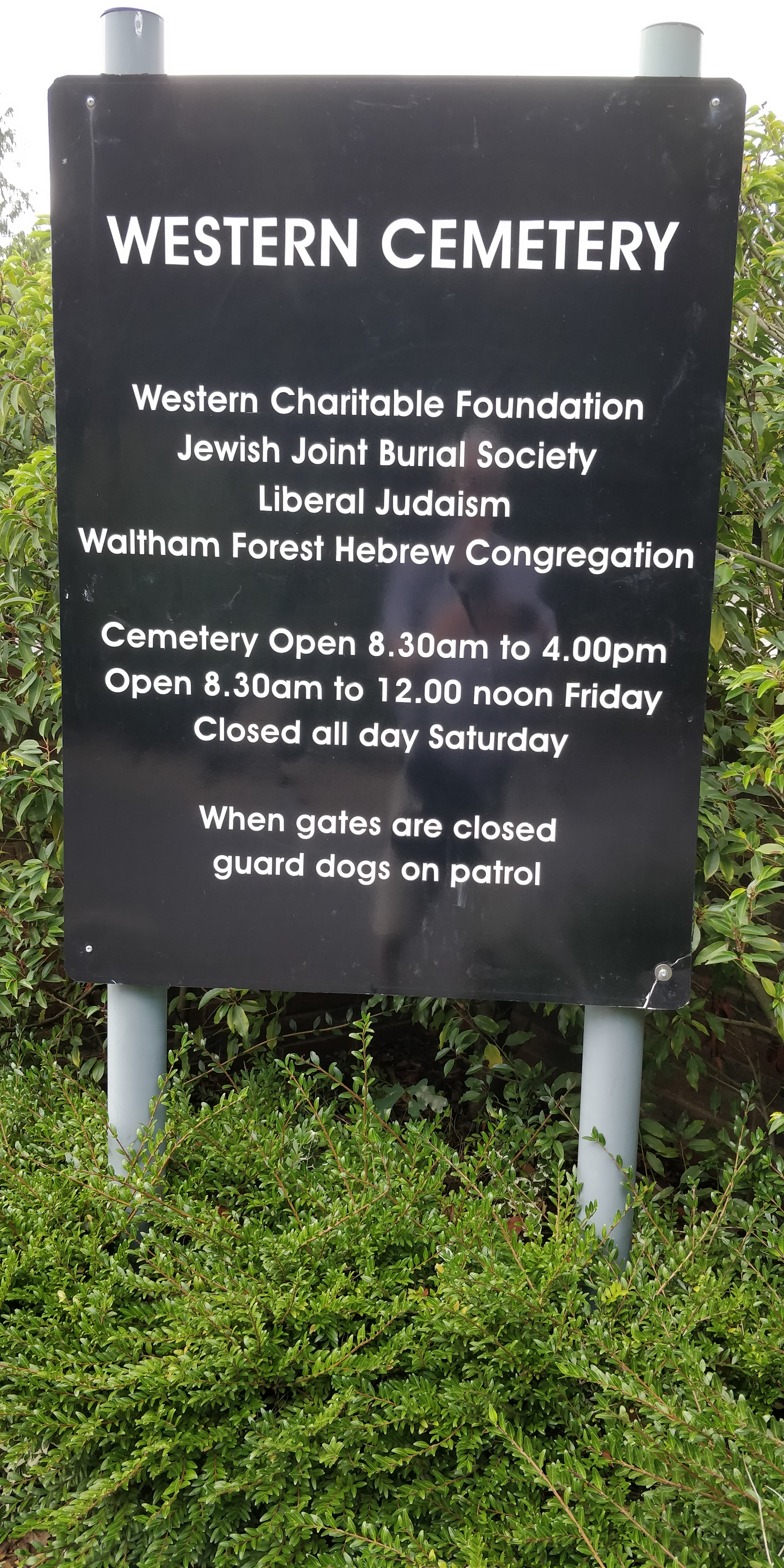
- Sign at cemetery's entrance
- Interactive map of Western Cemetery

Details
- Established: 1968
- Location: Bulls Cross Ride, Cheshunt, Hertfordshire EN7 5HT
- Country: England, United Kingdom
- Coordinates: 51.6849°N 0.0624°W
- Type: Jewish
- Owned by: Western Charitable Foundation
- Website: Official website
- Find a Grave: Western Cemetery

Western Cemetery is a Jewish cemetery at Bulls Cross Ride in Cheshunt in the Borough of Broxbourne, Hertfordshire EN7 5HT, England. It was established as the cemetery of the Western (now Western Marble Arch) Synagogue, as well as the independent West End Great Synagogue. It is now run by the Western Charitable Foundation, which extends burial rights to the Jewish Joint Burial Society, (Note: "The Society purchased the right to bury in a number of plots at the Western Cemetery... from the Western Charitable Foundation which provides maintenance of the site and prepares the graves, for which the society pays a quarterly charge... There are sufficient plots to bury on this land at current rates for at least the next 50 years." "JJBS Trustee Report and Accounts 2016". Jewish Joint Burial Society. June 2017. p. 5.) Liberal Judaism and Waltham Forest Hebrew Congregation. It has two prayer halls – The Barnett Ohel, dating from 1967, and the Gee Ohel.

Notable interments include the grave of leading writer and theologian Rabbi Louis Jacobs (1920–2006), the founder of Masorti (Conservative) Judaism in the UK, who is buried alongside his wife Sophie (Shulamit) (1921–2005).

== Gallery ==
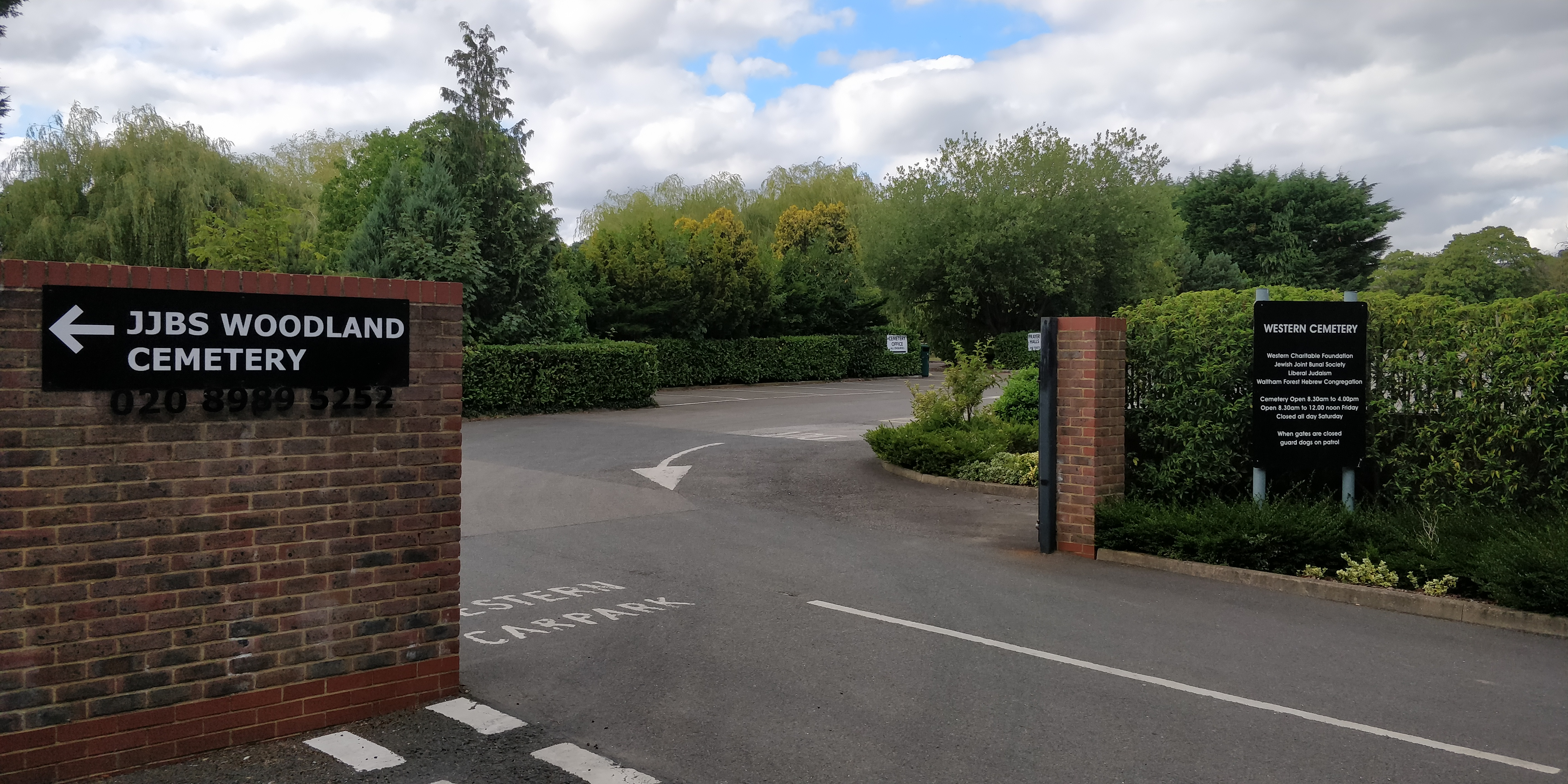
Cemetery entrance

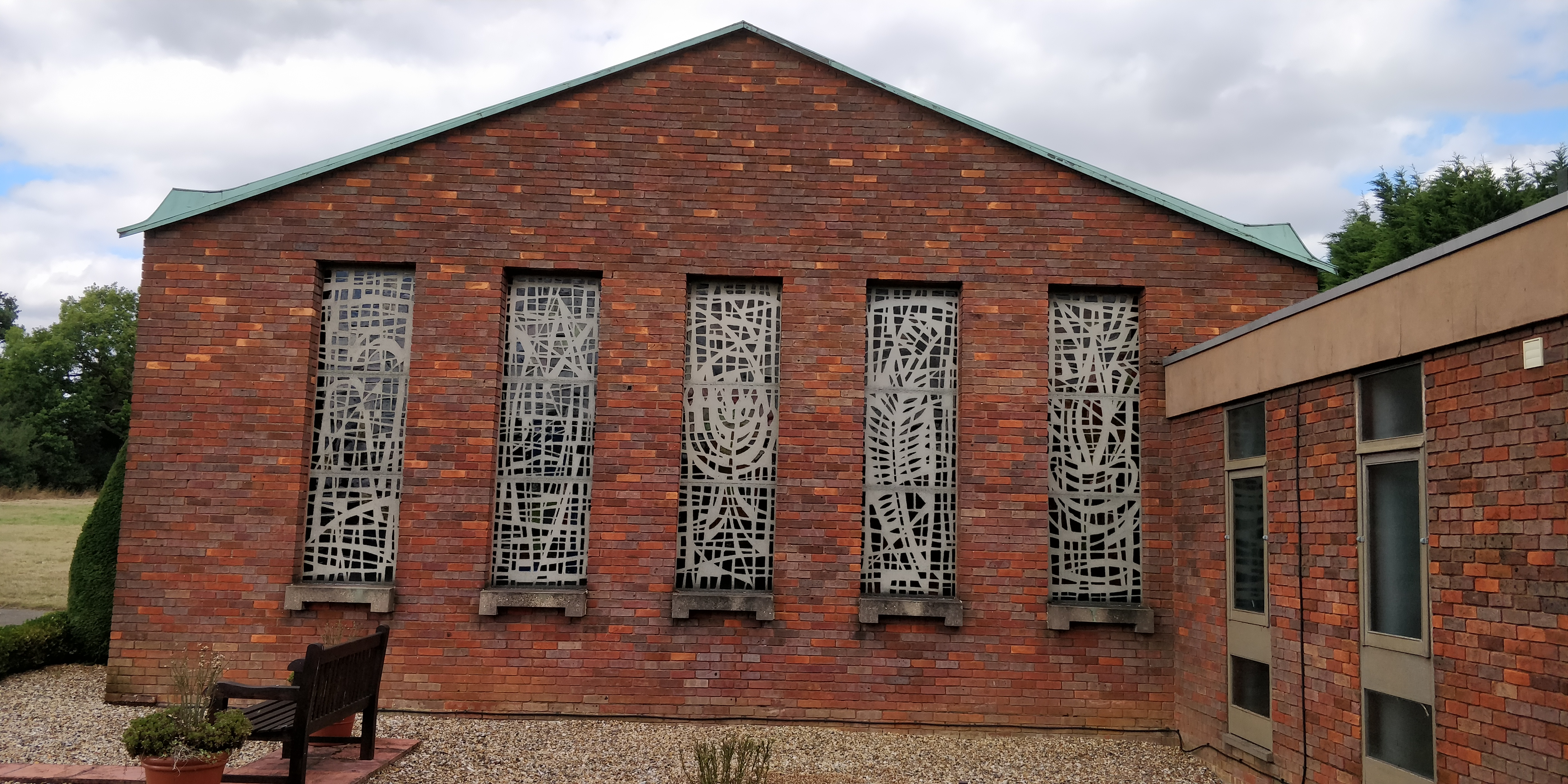
Barnett Ohel (prayer hall)

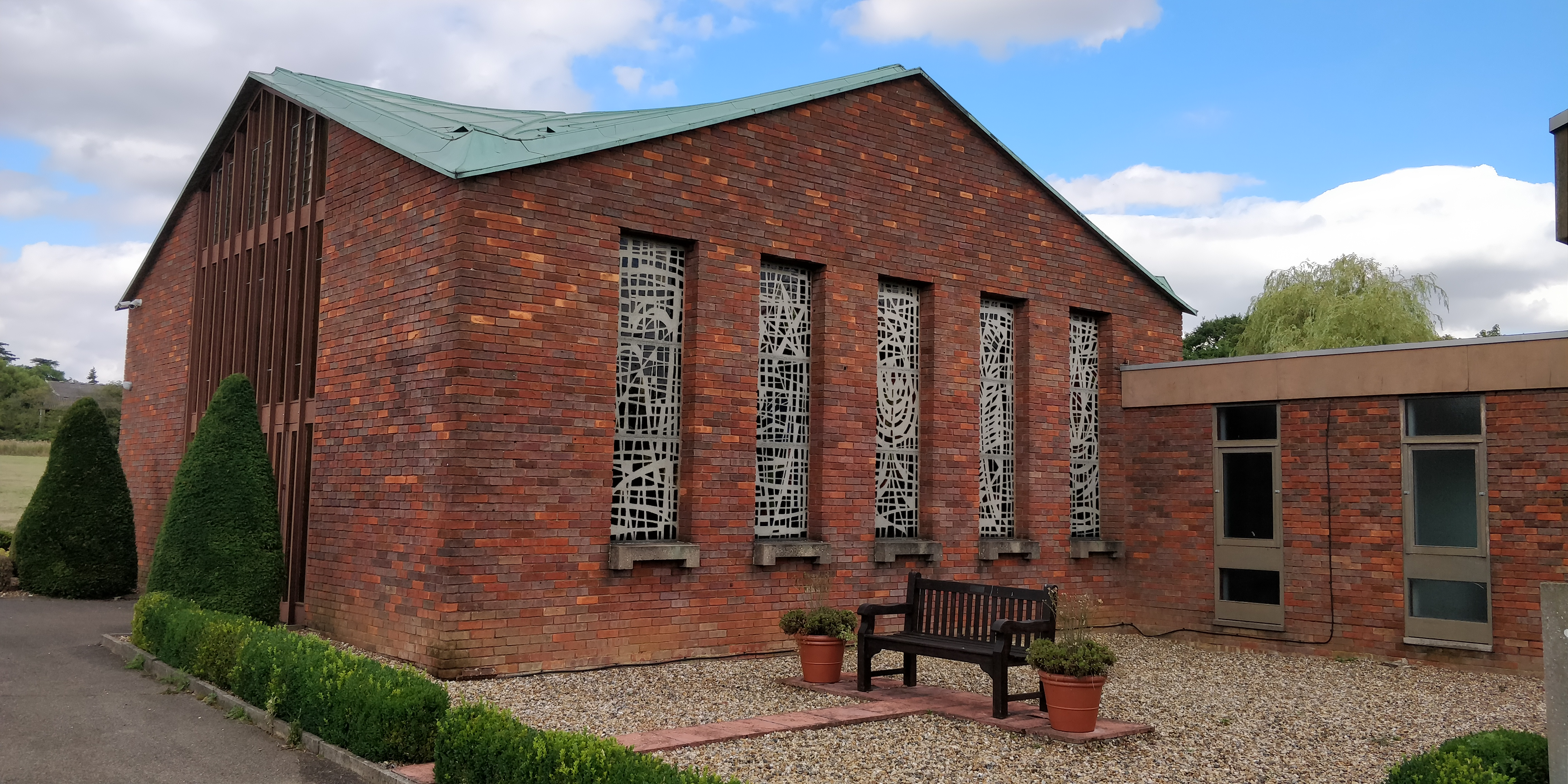
Barnett Ohel

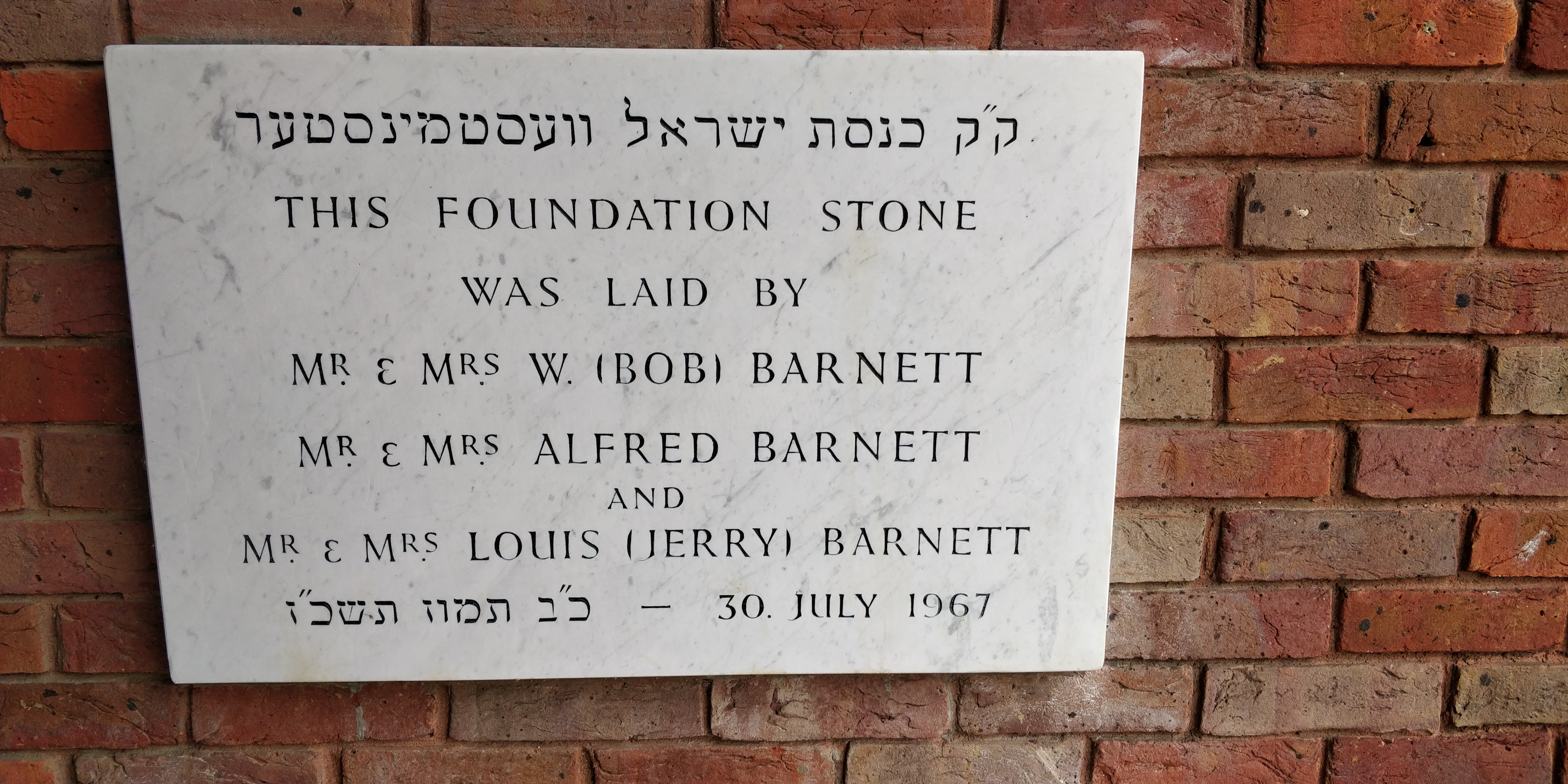
Foundation stone, Barnett Ohel

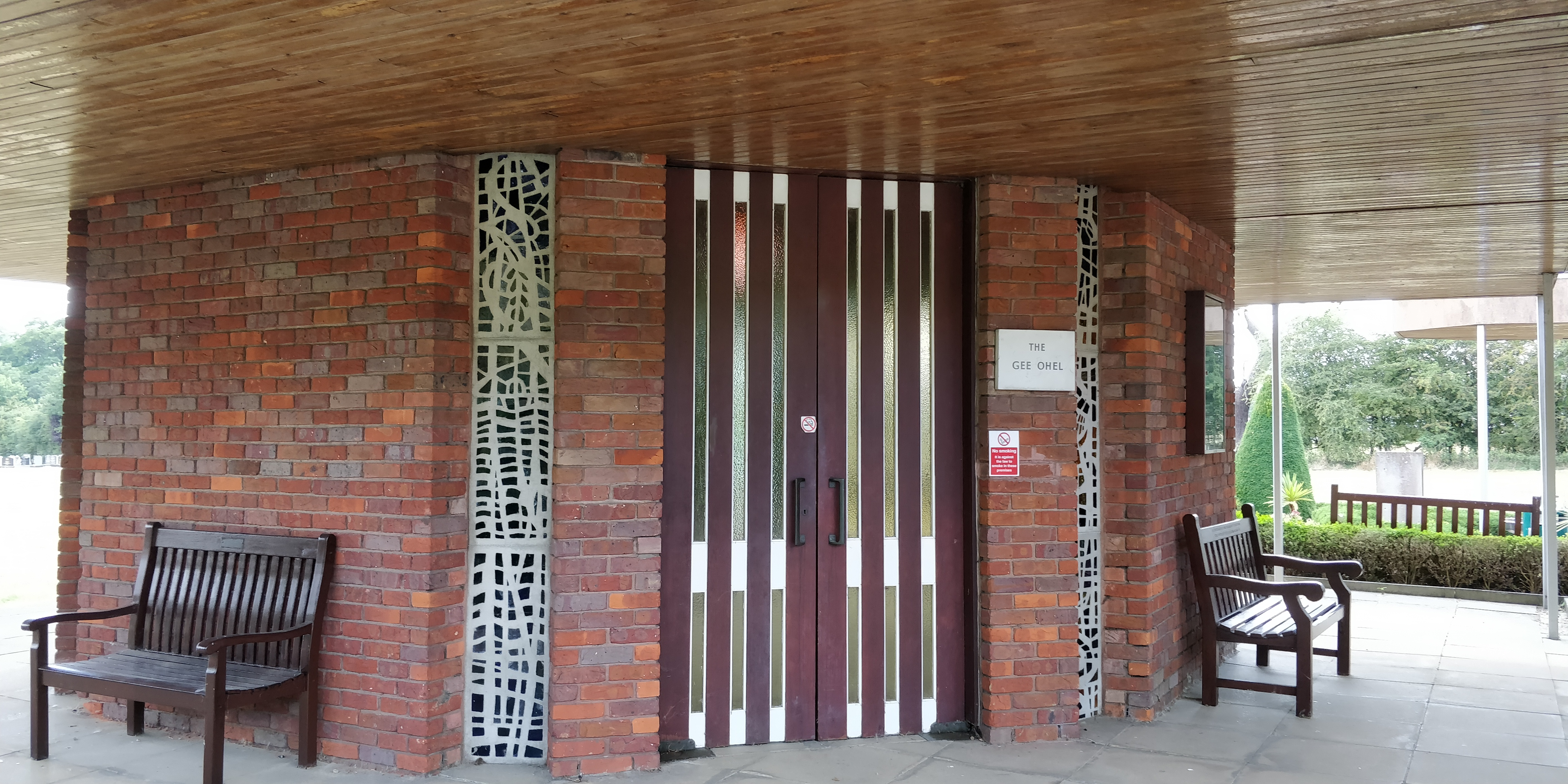
Gee Ohel (prayer hall)

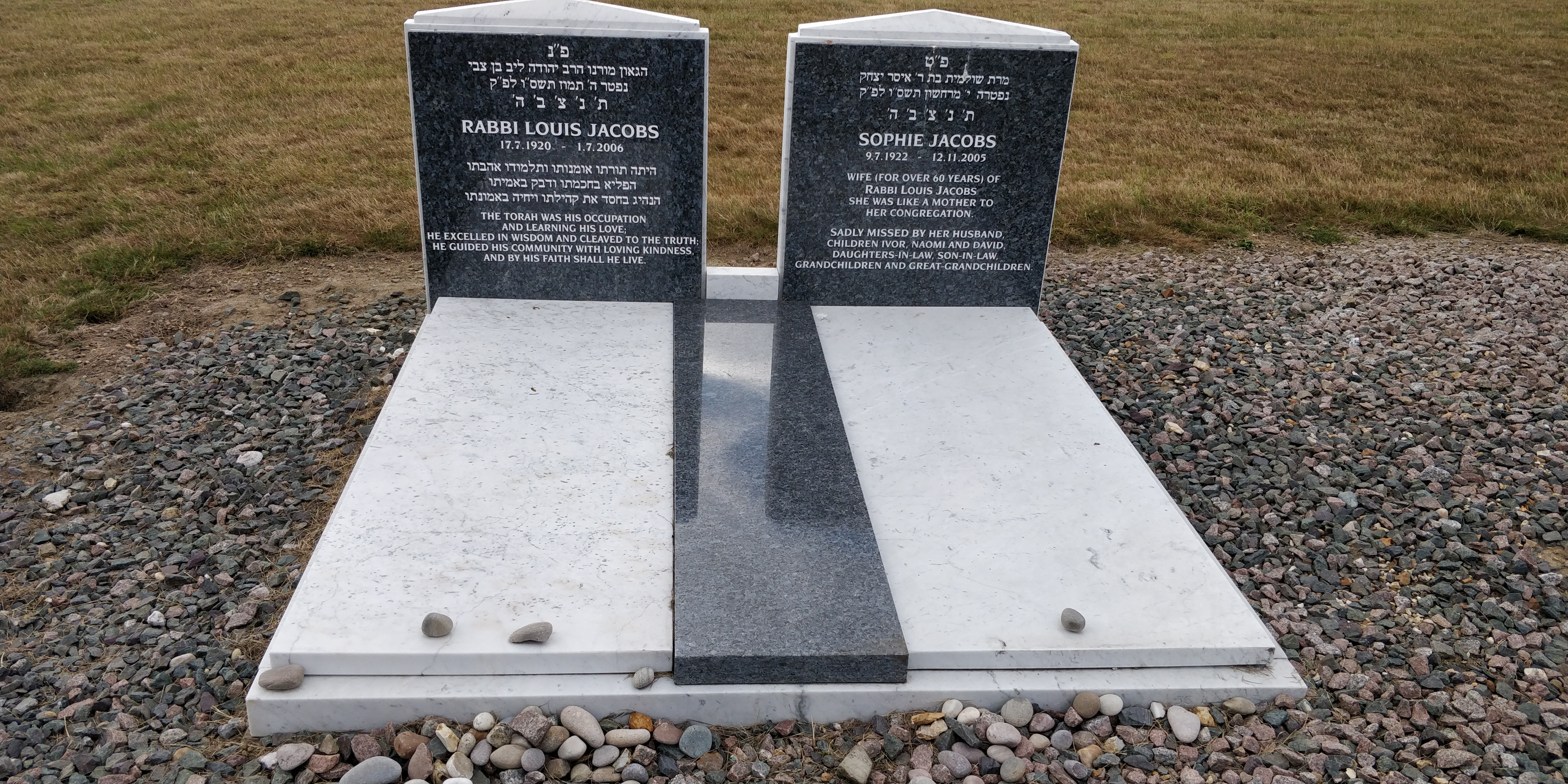
Graves of Rabbi Louis Jacobs and his wife Sophie

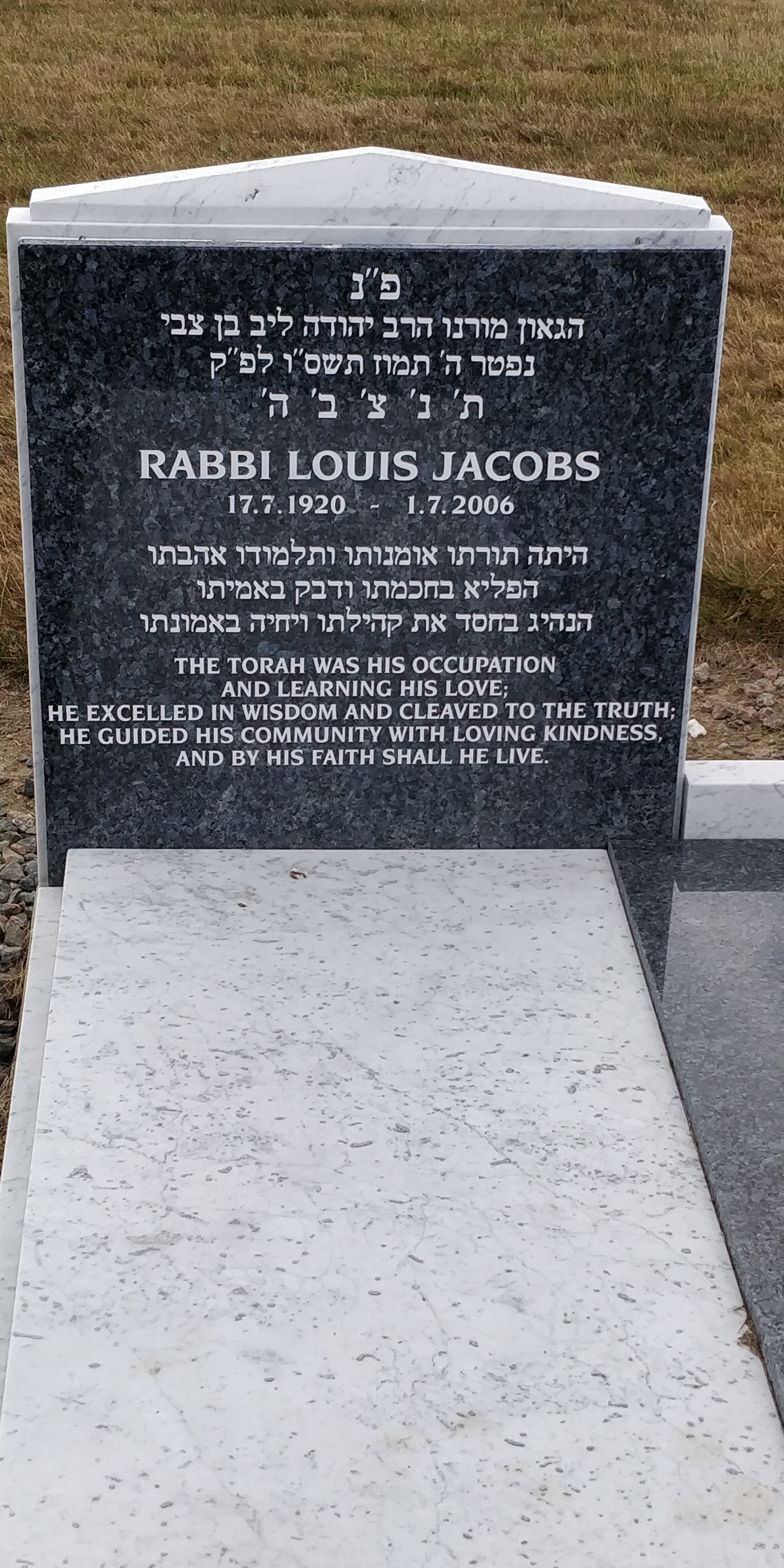
Rabbi Louis Jacobs' grave

== See also ==
- Jewish cemeteries in the London area
- Jewish communities in the United Kingdom
