= Elizabeth Tikvah Sarah =

British rabbi and author

Elizabeth Tikvah Sarah (also known as Rabbi Elli Sarah) is a British rabbi and author.

Sarah graduated from the London School of Economics in 1977 and was ordained in 1989. Sarah (who took her middle name as her surname) and Rabbi Sheila Shulman were the first openly lesbian graduates of the Leo Baeck College. Sarah was also one of the first ten female rabbis ordained in Britain. Sarah worked as a full-time congregational rabbi for Buckhurst Hill Reform Synagogue, 1989–94, as Director of Programmes for the Reform Synagogues of Great Britain and Deputy Director of the Sternberg Centre, 1994–97, and as a freelance rabbi, including a part-time congregational appointment for the Leicester Progressive Jewish Congregation, 1998–2000.

Sarah has edited five books, written the book Trouble-Making Judaism, and contributed to several journals and anthologies, including writing Chapter 5, "Being a Lesbian Rabbi", in Lesbian Rabbis: The First Generation, by Rebecca Alpert, Sue Levi Elwell and Shirley Idelson (Rutgers University Press, 2001).
