= SAFiYAA =

London-based fashion label

SAFIYAA is a London-based fashion label founded in 2011 by Daniela Karnuts. She started the company with 12 dress designs and the goal of being "created by women for women." Famous fans of the brand include Jennifer Lopez and Kate Winslet.

In 2018, the Duchess of Sussex, Meghan Markle, wore a SAFIYAA evening gown at a state dinner in Fiji with Prince Harry. The following month, she also wore a SAFIYAA outfit in London at her first Royal Variety Performance.
