= Hugo Gryn =

Czechoslovak-born British Reform rabbi and broadcaster (1930–1996)

Rabbi Hugo Gryn
- Rabbi Hugo Gryn in Karlovy Vary, 1989

Personal life
- Born: Hugo Gruen; 25 June 1930 Berehovo, Czechoslovakia
- Died: 18 August 1996 (aged 66) London, England
- Buried: Golders Green Jewish Cemetery
- Spouse: Jacqueline Selby (m. 1957)
- Education: Hebrew Union College
- Occupation: Rabbi

Religious life
- Religion: Judaism
- Denomination: Reform Judaism

Jewish leader
- Position: Senior Rabbi
- Synagogue: West London Synagogue

Hugo Gabriel Gryn (pronounced Green by him; 25 June 1930 – 18 August 1996), born Hugo Gruen, was a British Reform rabbi, a national broadcaster and a leading voice in interfaith dialogue.

== Biography ==
=== Early life and education ===
Hugo Gryn was born into a prosperous Jewish family in the market town of Berehovo in Carpathian Ruthenia, which was then in Czechoslovakia, and is now in Ukraine. His parents, who married in 1929, were Geza Gryn (1900–1945), a timber merchant, and Bella Neufeld (1908–1964).

The town of Berehovo was annexed by Hungary in 1938 as part of the occupation of Czechoslovakia. In 1940 he relocated to a boarding school in Debrecen, Hungary, until 1944.

In early 1944, his father was able to obtain exit visas to Turkey for the immediate family of four. However, he did not proceed at the time, due to concerns about the safety of the larger extended family. In April 1944, the family was forcibly moved out of their home into the Berehovo Ghetto.

Gryn and his grandparents, parents and younger brother were deported to Auschwitz on 28 May 1944, arriving on 31 May. On arrival at Auschwitz, Hugo Gryn, then aged 13, heard a prisoner of the camp mutter to him in Yiddish, “You are 18 and you’ve got a trade.” His father reiterated this advice to Hugo, so Gryn told the Nazi guards that he was 19 instead of 13, and was a carpenter. This resulted in him being sent to work instead of being sent to the gas chambers during the selection on arrival.

However, his ten-year-old brother, Gabriel, was unable to pass for an adult. Gabriel was separated from the family and was murdered shortly after arrival in the gas chambers. His mother was also separated from the family; she ended up surviving the ordeal, and was reunited with Hugo after the war.

Hugo and his father were chosen for carpentry work after volunteering that they had experience in this area, and were moved to Lieberose concentration camp. After a period of forced labour, they were sent on a death march to Sachsenhausen concentration camp in February 1945, before being moved to another concentration camp at Mauthausen, and finally, in April, on another death march to Gunskirchen, a sub-camp of Mauthausen, where they were liberated by the US Army 71st Infantry Division on 4 May 1945.

His father died a few days after he and Hugo were liberated, from suspected typhus.

Gryn came to the United Kingdom in early 1946 as part of the third group of children airlifted to the UK called "The Boys", and was sent to board at Polton House Farm School in Lasswade, near Edinburgh. With the help of a teacher named Miss Harris, he learnt English and then studied for his School Certificate examination in 1947 at Harpur Trust School in Bedford (now Bedford School), gaining several distinctions, before attending Lordsfield, a boarding school in Overton, Hampshire. After a short period serving as a volunteer in the Israeli army, (Note: A personal account of Gryn's experiences in the Israeli army can be found in Martin Gilbert, The Boys: Triumph over Adversity (London: Phoenix, 1997), p. 399. ISBN 9780753800324) he spent time studying rabbinical texts with Leo Baeck at the latter's home in London. In 1950, he went to Cincinnati, in the United States, where he studied for the rabbinate at the Hebrew Union College, a seminary for Reform rabbis.

=== Career ===
Upon receiving his ordination, Gryn was sent to Bombay by the World Union for Progressive Judaism, which had sponsored his studies, and following a spell working for the Union and for the American Jewish Joint Distribution Committee in New York, he returned to Britain in 1964, where he served in one of the largest congregations in Europe, the West London Synagogue, initially as assistant rabbi and later as senior rabbi, for 32 years. Gryn became a regular radio broadcaster, appearing for many years on BBC Radio 4's Thought for the Day and The Moral Maze.

In 1989, Gryn returned to Berehovo, together with his daughter Naomi, to make a film, Chasing Shadows, about his childhood. After his death, Naomi edited his autobiography, also called Chasing Shadows, which deals movingly with his experiences as a Holocaust survivor.

Gryn was described as "probably the most beloved rabbi in Great Britain" by Rabbi Albert Friedlander, who was also the author of the entry about Gryn in the Oxford Dictionary of National Biography.

=== Personal life ===
He married Jacqueline Selby on 1 January 1957, and they had four children together.

Gryn died of cancer on 18 August 1996, aged 66, and is buried at Hoop Lane Cemetery in Golders Green, London. The grave lies in a relatively prominent location, just north-east of the main entrance. The Chief Rabbi at the time, Jonathan Sacks, did not attend his funeral. This was referred to in the British press as "The Gryn Affair". Sacks wrote in later leaked private correspondence that, as part of the Jewish Reform movement, Rabbi Gryn was a part of a "false grouping" and one of "those who destroy the faith".

Gryn was the maternal grandfather of Zac Brettler, whose death was the subject of Patrick Radden Keefe's book London Falling.
