= Albert Friedlander =

Albert H Friedlander
- Born: Albert Hoschander Friedlander; May 10, 1927; Berlin, Germany
- Died: July 8, 2004 (aged 77)
- Occupations: Rabbi, teacher, humanitarian, author
- Years active: 1951–2004
- Spouse: Evelyn Friedlander (m. 1961)
- Children: 3, including Noam and Michal
- Awards: OBE in 2001 for Interfaith work, Order of Merit of the Federal Republic of Germany in 1993 for Anglo-Jewish relations

Albert Hoschander Friedlander OBE (10 May 1927 – 8 July 2004) was a German-American rabbi and professor who became the Rabbi Emeritus of the Westminster Synagogue in London.

Friedlander was born in Berlin. He and his family escaped Germany after Kristallnacht sailing to Cuba on the last boat to land before the MS St. Louis. He graduated from the University of Chicago and entered the Hebrew Union College in Cincinnati. He was ordained as a rabbi in 1952. From 1956 to 1961, he served as Rabbi for Temple B'nai B'rith, in Wilkes-Barre, Pennsylvania. He also taught part-time at Wilkes College. Friedlander then earned his Ph.D. in theology from Columbia University and became involved in the civil rights movement. In 1966, he moved to London, and became the rabbi of Wembley Liberal Synagogue while also lecturing at Leo Baeck College. In 1971, he became the rabbi for Westminster Synagogue. He became the Director of Studies at Leo Baeck from 1971 to 1982 and then served as Dean from 1982 to 2004. From 1975 to 1995, he was the Vice President for the World Union for Progressive Judaism.

Friedlander returned to Germany as a guest lecturer and speaker. In 1993, he was awarded the German Bundesverdienstkreuz First Class (Order of Merit) and, in 2001, he became the first overseas-born Rabbi to be appointed by the Queen to the Order of the British Empire (OBE).

== Early life and education ==
Albert Friedlander was born on 10 May 1927 in Berlin, the son of a textile broker, Alex Friedlander (d. 1956) and Sali Friedlander (d. 1965).

Friedlander and his family remained in Germany until 1939, spending Kristallnacht hiding in the home of Christian friends in the suburbs. The family sailed to Cuba, and were on the last boat allowed to land before the MS St. Louis was sent away. The three Friedlander children: Albert, his twin Charles, and their sister Dorrit, were sent to separate foster homes in Mississippi. Their parents had to remain in Cuba until their visa numbers came up in the quota system. Eventually the family was reunited in Vicksburg, Mississippi.

Friedlander graduated from Carr Central High School, Vicksburg in 1944, at the age of 16, and was accepted immediately by the University of Chicago. While studying at college, he was also gaining a reputation as a long-distance runner. He had been a champion in Mississippi, and was able to run the mile in 4 minutes 30 seconds. The U of C coach suggested that he try out for the 1948 Olympic team, but he decided to concentrate on his studies instead, having made up his mind to enter rabbinic school upon gaining his bachelor's degree. At the age of 18, Friedlander graduated from college and entered Hebrew Union College in Cincinnati to begin his path to the rabbinate. He was ordained with the class of 1952. While still at rabbinical school, he was part of the first group of students that took part in the National Federation of Temple Youth camps in Wisconsin, and remained committed to NFTY throughout his career.

== Career ==
From 1956 to 1961, he served as Rabbi for Temple B'nai B'rith, a Reform synagogue founded in 1845 and located in Wilkes-Barre, Pennsylvania. During his tenure there he also served as a part-time faculty member for Wilkes College (now university).

He then left for a position as advisor to Jewish students at Columbia University in New York City, where he gained a Ph.D. in theology, writing on the work of Rabbi Leo Baeck. He also became very involved in the fight for civil rights, taking his students down to Memphis to march with Dr. Martin Luther King Jr.

In 1966, he moved with his family to London, to become the rabbi of Wembley Liberal Synagogue. In 1971, he was invited to follow Rabbi Harold Reinhart and serve the Westminster Synagogue in Knightsbridge, London. He remained there until his retirement, upon which he was created Rabbi Emeritus.

He was also a lecturer at the Leo Baeck College from 1967 to 1971, before becoming Director of Studies from 1971 to 1982 and then Dean from 1982 to 2004. From 1975 to 1995 he was the Vice President for the World Union for Progressive Judaism. He was chairman of the British branch of the World Conference of Religions for Peace (1990–94), committed to the Three Faiths Forum, and a president of the Council of Christians and Jews.

Friedlander was involved in many interfaith dialogues, both nationally and internationally. He returned to Germany a number of times, as a guest professor at many German universities, as a speaker and teacher at the Evangelischen Kirchentage and Katholikentage and he also appeared regularly in various German media.

In 1993, he was awarded the Bundesverdienstkreuz First Class (the Order of Merit) from the German government and, in 2001, he became the first overseas-born Rabbi to be appointed to the Order of the British Empire (OBE).

== Personal life ==
In 1961, he married Evelyn Friedlander and had three children: Ariel (who also became a rabbi), Michal, and Noam. His sister, Dorrit Friedlander, died 11 years after his death and lies buried in Appleton, Wisconsin. His wife, Evelyn, died in October in 2019, after a long illness.

== Death ==
He died on 8 July 2004 in London, and is buried in the West London cemetery at Hoop Lane, Golders Green, surrounded by friends and congregants.

== Selected bibliography ==
- "Never Trust A God Over 30" (1967)
- Leo Baeck: Teacher Of Theresienstadt (1968), 1991, ISBN 0-87951-393-4
- Out Of The Whirlwind: A Reader Of Holocaust Literature (1968)
- The Six Days Of Destruction (with Elie Wiesel, 1988)
- A Thread Of Gold: Journeys Towards Reconciliation (1990)
- Riders Towards The Dawn: From Ultimate Suffering To Tempered Hope (1993)
- The Five Scrolls: (with Herbert N Bronstein, 1984)
