= Ziegler School of Rabbinic Studies =

Religious graduate school

Coordinates: 34.127840°N 118.472279°W

- Type: Jewish theological college
- Established: 1996; 30 years ago
- Affiliations: American Jewish University
- Religious affiliation: Jewish (Conservative/Masorti movement)
- Dean: Rabbi Dr. Bradley Shavit Artson, Rabbi Cheryl Peretz, Rabbi Samuel Rosenbaum
- Location: Los Angeles, California, United States
- Campus: Urban
- Website: Official website

The Ziegler School of Rabbinic Studies is the graduate program of study leading to ordination as a Conservative rabbi at the American Jewish University (formerly known as the "University of Judaism"), offering a Master in Rabbinic Studies (MARS) degree.

== History ==
Founded in 1996, it was the first independent rabbinical school located on the West Coast of the United States. It ordained its first class in 1999.

Located in Los Angeles, it has ordained more than 200 rabbis, about half of them women. The school attracts an international student body, with students from Australia, Brazil, Canada, France, Israel, Mexico, Uganda, and the United Kingdom, as well as from every region of the United States. Upon ordination, Ziegler rabbis serve in every sector of the United States and Israel. Ziegler rabbis are automatically admitted to the international Rabbinical Assembly.

The Ziegler School ordained only two students in 2021. In 2022, it slashed tuition by 80%, aiming to attract more students and make rabbinical school more accessible. In 2023, after AJU sold off their campus in Bel Air, Los Angeles, the Ziegler School relocated to an office building in Pico-Robertson. Starting in fall 2023, the Ziegler School of Rabbinic Studies at American Jewish University implemented several reforms. The program has been reduced from five to four years, now includes a paid residency in the final year, lowers tuition, and substitutes the year-long Israel program with a 10- to 12-week intensive, acknowledging the substantial Israel experience of most incoming students.

In April 2023, several former Ziegler students sent a letter to the Rabbinical Assembly regarding "a culture of sexism and sexual harassment" at Ziegler, asking for an investigation and a change of leadership. In March 2024, the Jewish Telegraphic Agency revealed that AJU had hired law firm Cozen O'Connor to investigate complaints of gender-based misconduct at the Ziegler School. The complaints, made over the previous two decades by former rabbinical students, allege a pattern of male favoritism and disrespectful treatment by dean Rabbi Bradley Shavit Artson and deputy dean Rabbi Cheryl Peretz, who were notified of the investigation by a Cozen O'Connor attorney. It also said that Artson and Peretz are the subject of a probe by the RA over a similar set of allegations. On June 17th, AJU made a brief statement by email summarizing the report, claiming that while students experienced sexism and homophobia, it was not systemic. It agreed to adopt the recommendations of the report, which include revamping its Title IX program and improving student support services. Some complainants called on the university to release the full report and accused the university of trying to whitewash the issue with its statement. As of July 2024, the report had not been released to the RA or the public. The RA's investigation of Artson and Peretz is ongoing.

== Notable people ==
- Faculty:
  - Aryeh Cohen
  - Elliot N. Dorff
  - Ziony Zevit
- Alumni:
  - Natasha Mann
  - Gershom Sizomu
- Julie Platt (board member)
