= Jewish seminary =

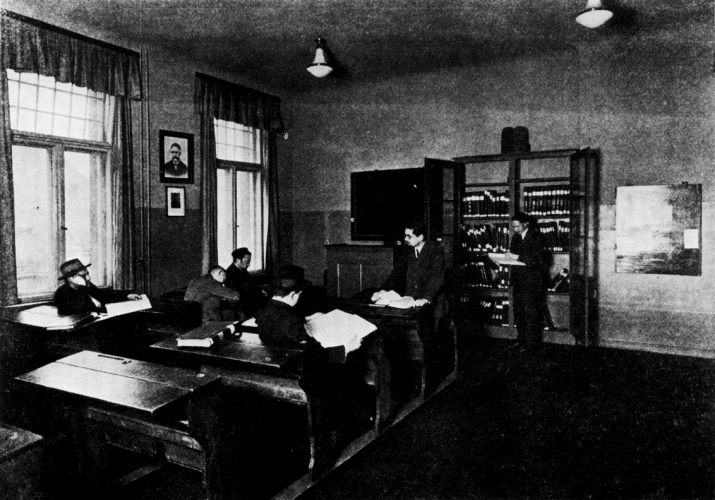

A Jewish seminary, better known as a rabbinical seminary or rabbinical school, is a Jewish educational institution for the purpose of training rabbis. (In some cases, a "Jewish seminary" may also refer to a cantorial school.) While rabbis have been part of Judaism for centuries, rabbinical seminaries only became distinct institutions in the early 19th century.

== History ==
Today, rabbinical seminaries differ from other Jewish educational institutions due to the influence of the Haskalah, the Jewish Enlightenment movement. Before this movement, yeshivot granted rabbinical ordination to those who completed an intensive course of study focusing on Talmudic and halakhic literature. The development of rabbinical seminaries was not without controversy as these new institutions were to provide a secular degree alongside rabbinic ordination (semikha), and thus some viewed this as promotion of heresy and assimilation.

== Examples ==
Some Jewish rabbinical seminaries include those listed below; this is not an exhaustive list.

Est.	Institution	Movement	Location
1875	Hebrew Union College	Reform	New York City, NY, US
1886	Jewish Theological Seminary of America	Conservative	New York City, NY, US
1962	Seminario Rabínico Latinoamericano	Conservative	Buenos Aires, Argentina
1968	Reconstructionist Rabbinical College	Reconstructionist	Wyncote, PA, US
1873; 2009	Hildesheimer Rabbinical Seminary / Rabbinerseminar zu Berlin	Orthodox	Berlin, Germany
1998	Sephardic Rabbinical College	N/A - Sephardi	Brooklyn, NY, US
1984	Schechter Rabbinical Seminary	Conservative (traditional)	Jerusalem, Israel
1956	Rabbinical College of America	Hasidic (Chabad)	Morristown, NJ, US

== See also ==
- Jewish education
- Jewish day school
- Midrasha
- Rabbinic Judaism
