= Sternberg Centre =

Campus of Jewish institutions in London

The Sternberg Centre for Judaism, in East End Road, Finchley, London, is a campus hosting a number of Jewish institutions, built around the 18th-century Finchley manor house.

It was founded to facilitate a number of Reform and Liberal Jewish institutions, attached to the Movement for Reform Judaism (previously Reform Synagogues of Great Britain), principally through education and cultural means. The centre was opened in 1981 by the Manor House Trust and is now named after Sigmund Sternberg. The founding organisations are: Leo Baeck College, the Movement for Progressive Judaism and the Akiva School, the first Reform Jewish day school in England (also opened in 1981). Later the (Masorti) New North London Synagogue also located there. The Sternberg Centre also includes the offices of the Movement of Progressive Judaism,RSY Netzer, LJY Netzer, The Zionist Youth Movements for The Movement for Progressive Judaism.

The centre also hosted the Jewish Museum, Finchley until 2007.

== The Movement for Progressive Judaism ==
The Movement for Progressive Judaism has its headquarters at the site. The Movement is the national umbrella organisation of 77 autonomous synagogues and communities. Staff based at the Sternberg Centre work to support these congregations including work with small communities, the Reform and Liberal Beit Din (religious court), education, youth work, work with students and young adults and practical support for synagogues including HR, IT and communications.

Regular events are organised including conferences, residential weekends and youth camps. Progressive Judaism welcomes individuals, couples and families of all backgrounds and identities, meeting people where they are and supporting them in the Jewish journeys they choose.

== Akiva School ==
Akiva School was established in 1981. It became a two-form entry voluntary-aided school in 2007 and moved into a new purpose-built state-of-the-art building in January 2008. Akiva is the only voluntary-aided Progressive Jewish primary school in north-west London. It is an inclusive and egalitarian learning community, teaching its children to be happy, confident and knowledgeable citizens, with a love of Israel and all aspects of Judaism. Akiva children are taught to understand and respect themselves, others and the world.

== The Art Stables ==
The Art Stables is a community-based art school located at the Sternberg Centre. Founded in 2013, it offers a wide range of classes and workshops in drawing, painting, sculpture and other visual arts for adults of all abilities. The Art Stables provides an inclusive and welcoming environment where creativity, learning and community engagement are encouraged through high-quality teaching and artistic practice.

== New North London Synagogue ==
New North London Synagogue
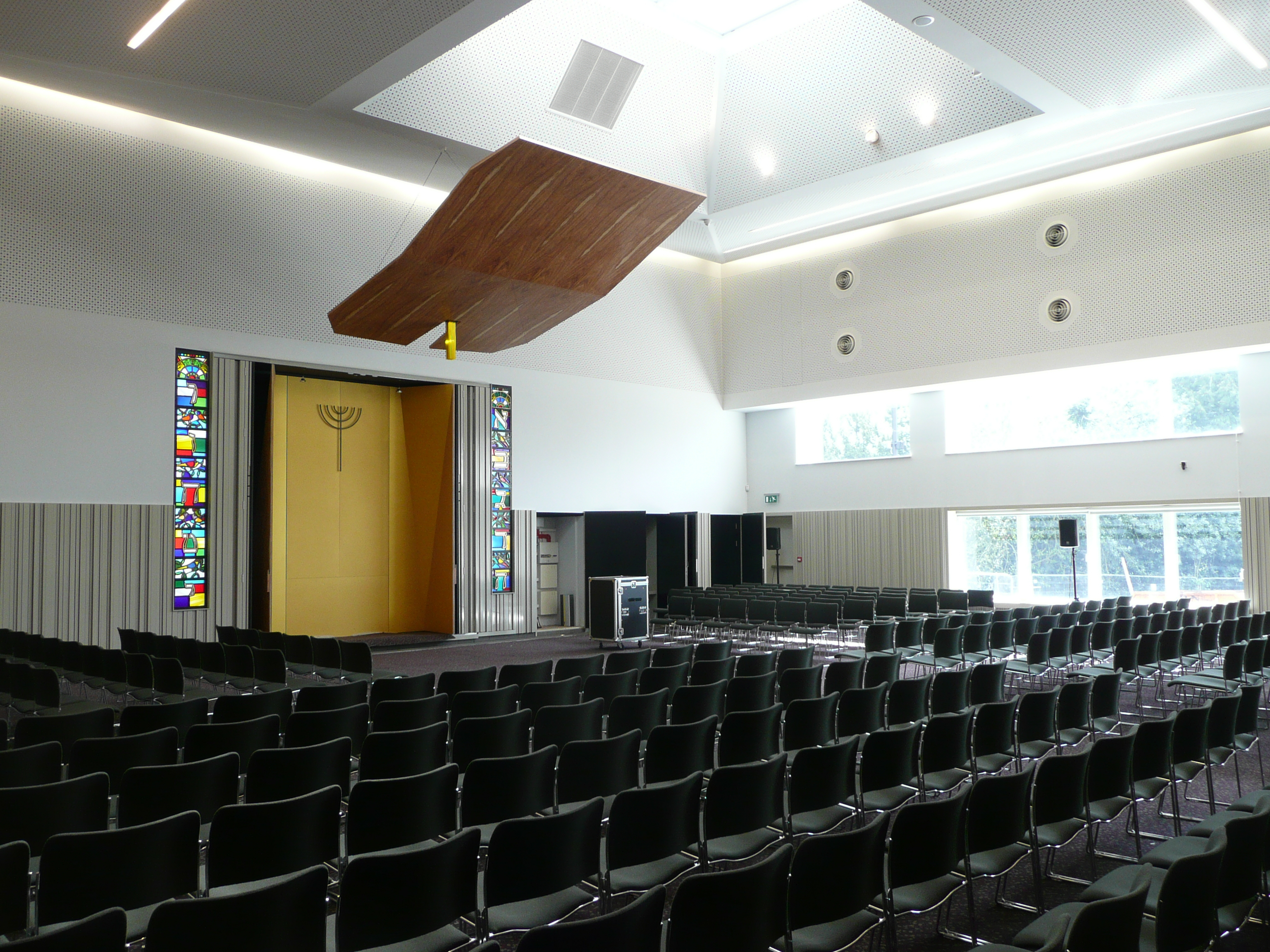
- The synagogue interior in 2012

- Location of the synagogue in the Sternberg Centre, in Greater London

Religion
- Affiliation: Conservative Judaism
- Rite: Masorti Judaism
- Ecclesiastical or organisational status: Synagogue
- Leadership: Rabbi Jonathan Wittenberg
- Status: Active

Location
- Location: 80 East End Road, Finchley, Borough of Barnet, London, England N3 2SY
- Country: United Kingdom
- Coordinates: 51°35′43″N 0°11′22″W

Architecture
- Architect: van Heyningen and Haward Architects
- Established: 1974 (as a congregation)
- Completed: 2011

Website
- mynnls.org.uk

The congregation, which is affiliated to the Masorti movement, was founded in 1974 by followers of Louis Jacobs, and now has about 3,500 members. The rabbi of the congregation from 1987 - 2025 was Rabbi Jonathan Wittenberg, who is now the Emeritus Rabbi.

After some years of nomadic existence, the congregation raised over £6 million to construct a synagogue building in the Sternberg Centre site, which was opened in 2011. Designed by van Heyningen and Haward Architects, the new synagogue includes three prayer venues, a teenager’s room, as well as social and administrative spaces.

== Leo Baeck College ==
Named in honour of Leo Baeck, the inspirational 20th-century German Reform rabbi, Leo Baeck College was founded in 1956 as a rabbinical school for training Liberal and Reform rabbis. Today, the college is a centre for the training of rabbis and teachers, and an educational consultancy. It also helps the development of community leaders and provides access to Jewish learning for all through interfaith work. It is a degree-awarding institution, specialising in Hebrew and other Jewish-related subjects. It is now based at the Sternberg Centre.

== Manor House Centre for Psychotherapy and Counselling ==
The Manor House Centre for Psychotherapy and Counselling (MHCPC) provides training for people working or planning to work in both paid and voluntary positions in the community. There are excellent teaching facilities, a library and cafeteria. The Training Programme has developed over many years experience enabling students to work effectively and creatively within the counselling field, in the community and in specific work places. The term "counselling" is used in many contexts and the variety of trainings and models can be confusing. The MHCPC offers comprehensive training in psychodynamic counselling leading to the Certificate in Counselling Skills or the Diploma in Psychodynamic Counselling and Therapy in the Community.

== Jewish Museum, Finchley ==
Opened as the Museum of the Jewish East End, founded by David Jacobs in 1983, the museum's main intent was the preservation of the heritage of London's East End, an important and large community which has since largely dissipated. Renamed the London Museum of Jewish Life in 1990, and subsequently amalgamating with the Jewish Museum in Camden Town, the museum diversified to include the history of other Jewish communities in London, and is also active in Holocaust and anti-racism education.

The Finchley museum closed in 2007 and moved in 2009 to an enlarged building on the Camden site, releasing space for the expansion of the Akiva School.

== See also ==
- History of Church End Finchley – includes a history of the old Manor House at the centre of the site
- History of the Jews in England
- List of Jewish communities in the United Kingdom
- List of synagogues in the United Kingdom
