= Leo Baeck College =

Coordinates: 51°35′43″N 0°11′22″W

Location
- The Sternberg Centre for Judaism; 80 East End Road; London, N3 2SY; England

Information
- Type: Further education, rabbinical seminary, teacher training
- Motto: At the Heart of Progressive Judaism
- Religious affiliation: Jewish
- Established: 1956
- Founder: Werner van der Zyl
- Local authority: London Borough of Barnet
- Chairman: Mimi Konigsberg
- Principal: Deborah Kahn-Harris
- Gender: Mixed
- Website: www.lbc.ac.uk

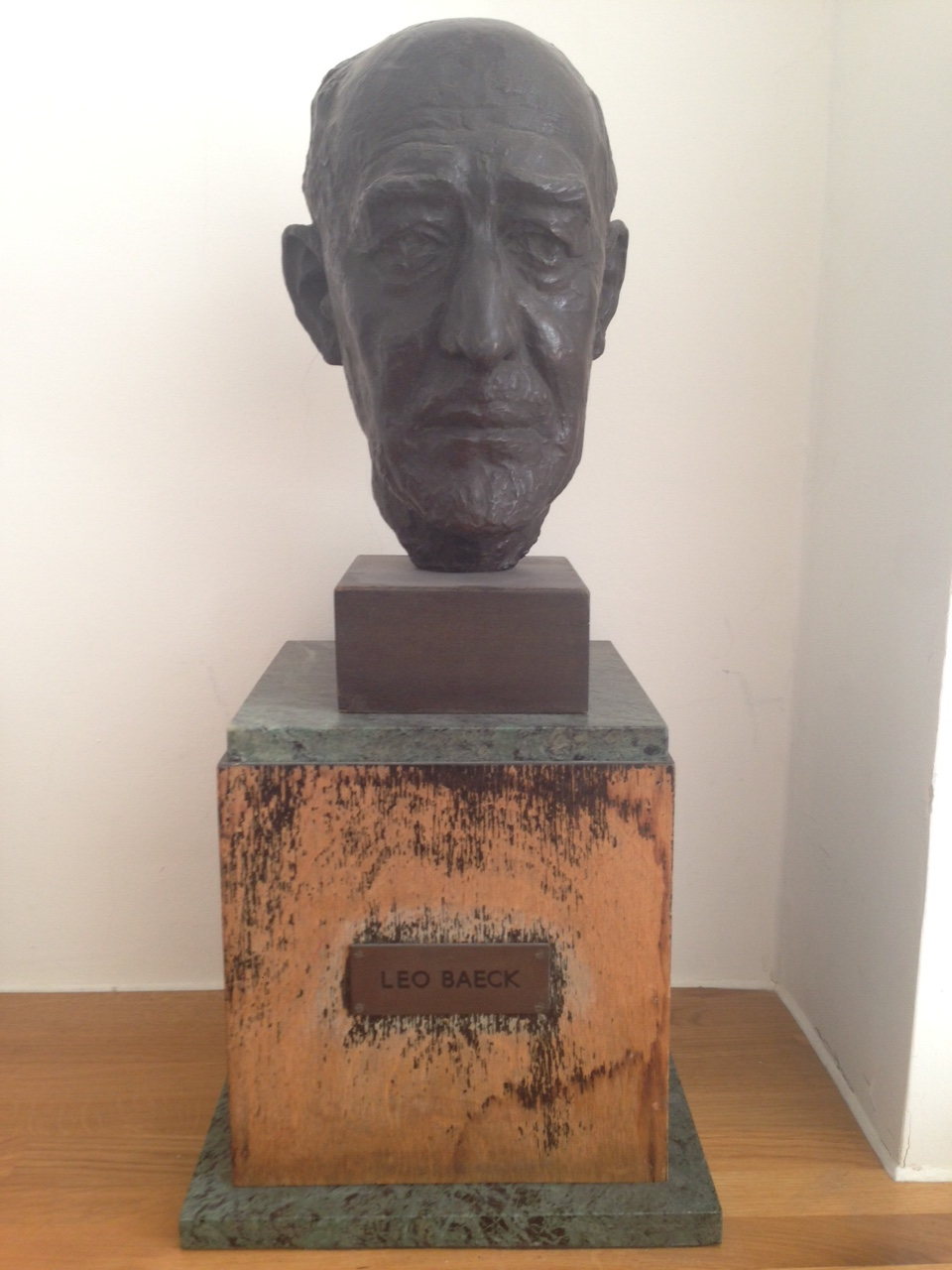
Bust of Leo Baeck at the Wiener Library for the Study of the Holocaust and Genocide in London

Leo Baeck College is a privately funded Reform rabbinical seminary and centre for the training of teachers in Jewish education. Based now at the Sternberg Centre, East End Road, Finchley, in the London Borough of Barnet, it was founded by Werner van der Zyl in 1956 and is sponsored by The Movement for Progressive Judaism. It is named after the inspirational 20th-century German Liberal rabbi Leo Baeck.

Rabbinic ordinations from Leo Baeck College are recognised worldwide by the Liberal, Reform and Masorti movements. To date, Leo Baeck College has trained over 200 rabbis, its alumni serving Jewish communities in the United Kingdom and across the world. Leo Baeck College also pioneered the training of rabbis to serve the Jewish communities of the former Soviet Union and has been at the forefront of Jewish-Christian-Muslim dialogue for decades. In addition to the training of rabbis, Leo Baeck College trains teachers, provides an educational consultancy for religion schools and Jewish day schools, supports the development of community leaders, and provides access to Jewish learning for all through interfaith work.

== History ==
Before Leo Baeck College was founded there was no institution for training Reform rabbis in Britain. All ministers had either received their training in the United States or were graduates of the Orthodox Jews' College who had later switched allegiance and served Reform synagogues. The college was founded in 1956 as the Jewish Theological College of London for the training of Liberal and Reform rabbis and was seen as a successor organisation to the Hochschule für die Wissenschaft des Judentums in Berlin and the Jewish Theological Seminary of Breslau. It was renamed Leo Baeck College shortly afterwards at van der Zyl's suggestion in honour of his teacher, Dr Leo Baeck, the inspirational 20th-century German Liberal rabbi.

=== Location ===
The college was originally housed at West London Synagogue and expanded into a new building at the West London Synagogue site in 1963. It moved in 1981 to larger premises at the Manor House (later known as The Sternberg Centre) in North Finchley, along with other institutions within the progressive Jewish movements. This in turn led to a major growth in its activities, especially its extramural department, which provided a wide range of day-time and evening activities for the wider public. Its teachers training department also expanded and eventually formed a separate education department that served both the Reform and Liberal movements, later being known as the Centre for Jewish Education (CJE). In 2001 CJE integrated with the old Leo Baeck College to become Leo Baeck College–Centre for Jewish Education (LBC-CJE).

=== Alumni ===
The college's first two students were Lionel Blue and Michael Leigh, both of whom became distinguished rabbis. Female students had been admitted from the outset, although none graduated as rabbis until Jacqueline Tabick in 1975.

Among Leo Baeck's other alumni are: Rabbi Tony Bayfield; Rabbi Pauline Bebe, the first woman rabbi in France; Rabbi Harry Jacobi; Rabbi Maurice Michaels, Jewish chaplain to the London 2012 Olympic Games; Rabbi Baroness Neuberger; Rabbi Jonathan Romain; Rabbi Sylvia Rothschild; Rabbi Elizabeth Tikvah Sarah; Rabbi Sybil Sheridan; Rabbi Jackie Tabick, the first female rabbi to be trained in the United Kingdom; and Rabbi Alexandra Wright, the first female senior rabbi in England.

=== Staff ===
In the first few years almost all the faculty members were refugees from Nazism. Van der Zyl's work was furthered by many others, including Rabbis Hugo Gryn and John D Rayner, who jointly supervised the college's affairs after his retirement. In 1972 Rabbi Albert Friedlander became Director and during his tenure the student body grew in size. Faculty members have also included Rabbi Louis Jacobs and Karen Armstrong.

In 1985 Rabbi Professor Jonathan Magonet became the first full-time Principal, a position he held for 20 years, retiring in 2005. He was succeeded by Rabbi Professor Marc Saperstein in the following year, when the combined new college adopted the name Leo Baeck College. Saperstein completed his term of office in July 2011 and continues to teach at the college as Professor of Jewish History and Homiletics.

The current Principal (since September 2011) is Rabbi Deborah Kahn-Harris, a graduate of Leo Baeck College and one of the first woman rabbis to lead a mainstream rabbinic seminary.

== Library ==
The college's library has 60,000 books, including donations of books from the former Hochschule library and many rare editions.

== Courses ==
Leo Baeck College describes its academic collaborations as follows: "Throughout its history, Leo Baeck College has had a number of collaborations with different academic bodies.

Its awards have been validated amongst others by the Council for National Academic Awards (CNAA), the Open University Validation Services (OUVS), the Institute of Education (IOE) and the University of Winchester (UoW).

From 2015 to 2016 Leo Baeck College formed a new partnership arrangement with Middlesex University which validates all the Jewish Studies awards, with the exception of the research awards. The degrees carry the imprimatur of Middlesex University."

== See also ==
- European Judaism (journal)
- Fridolin Friedmann, German progressive educator and lecturer on Jewish history
