= Louis Jacobs =

British rabbi, writer, and theologian (1920–2006)

Louis Jacobs CBE

Personal life
- Born: 17 July 1920 Manchester, England
- Died: 1 July 2006 (aged 85) London, England
- Buried: Western Cemetery (Cheshunt)
- Spouse: Sophie Jacobs (m. 1944; died 2005)
- Education: Gateshead Yeshiva
- Occupation: Rabbi, writer and theologian
- Website: www.louisjacobs.org

Religious life
- Religion: Judaism
- Denomination: Conservative Judaism

Jewish leader
- Position: Rabbi
- Synagogue: New London Synagogue
- Residence: London, England

Louis Jacobs CBE (17 July 1920 – 1 July 2006) was a leading writer, Jewish theologian, and rabbi of the New London Synagogue in the United Kingdom. He was also the focus in the early 1960s of what became known as the "Jacobs Affair" in the British Jewish community.

== Early career ==
Jacobs was born in Manchester on 17 July 1920. He studied at Manchester Yeshiva, and later at the kolel in Gateshead. His teachers included leading Rabbi Eliyahu Dessler. Jacobs was ordained as a rabbi at Manchester Yeshiva. Later in his career, he studied at University College London where he gained his PhD on the topic of The Business Life of the Jews in Babylon, 200–500 CE. Jacobs was appointed rabbi at Manchester Central Synagogue in 1948. In 1954, he was appointed to the New West End Synagogue in London.

Jacobs became Moral Tutor at Jews' College, London, where he taught Talmud and homiletics during the last years of Rabbi Dr Isidore Epstein's tenure as principal. By this time, Jacobs had drifted away from the traditional approach to Jewish theology that had marked his formative years. Instead, he struggled to find a synthesis that would accommodate Orthodox Jewish theology and modern-day higher biblical criticism. Jacobs was especially concerned with how to reconcile modern-day Orthodox Jewish faith with the documentary hypothesis. His ideas about the subject were outlined in the book, We Have Reason to Believe, which was published in 1957. The work was originally written to record the essence of discussions held on its title's subject at weekly classes given by Jacobs at the New West End Synagogue, and resulted in criticism at the time.

== We Have Reason to Believe ==
Most of Jacobs' book titled We Have Reason to Believe deals with such topics as proof of God's existence, pain, miracles, the afterlife, and election: ideas which were not in and of themselves controversial. Debate on the book was eventually to centre on chapters 6, 7, and 8: The Torah and Modern Criticism, A Synthesis of the Traditional and Critical Views and Bible Difficulties.

In these chapters, Jacobs engaged in a discussion of biblical criticism. Specifically, Jacobs was concerned with source criticism of the Torah and the documentary hypothesis; the latter of which suggests that the Torah derives from multiple sources rather than having been given, as Orthodox rabbinical traditions have it, complete in its present form by God to Moses during the period beginning on Mount Sinai and ending with Moses's death.

Jacobs comments: "While Judaism stands or falls on the belief in revelation, there is no 'official' interpretation on the way in which God spoke to man". He writes that, "according to some rabbis, [the Pentateuch] was given to Moses at intervals during the sojourn in the Wilderness". He also comments that, given the arguments of textual criticism, "no work of Jewish apologetics, however limited in scope, can afford to fight shy of the problem". Here there is an implied rebuke of the tendency of many Jewish authorities of the period simply to gloss over the inconveniences of the thoughts of the "modern critics" – a rebuke which may have rankled some.

Jacobs concludes: "There is nothing to deter the faithful Jew from accepting the principle of textual criticism". He is aware that "to talk about 'reconciling' the Maimonidean idea and the Documentary Hypothesis […] is futile, for you cannot reconcile two contradictory theories. But to say this is not to preclude the possibility of a synthesis between the old knowledge and the new knowledge".

Jacobs provides numerous examples from the Talmud and other rabbinical writings indicating acceptance of the idea of Divine intervention in human affairs with "God revealing his Will not alone to men but through men". He concludes that, even if the documentary hypothesis is partly (or even entirely) correct,

God's power is not lessened because He preferred to co-operate with His creatures in producing the Book of Books […] We hear the authentic voice of God speaking to us through the pages of the Bible […] and its message is in no way affected in that we can only hear that voice through the medium of human beings.

== The "Jacobs Affair" ==
It had been widely assumed that after Epstein's retirement as principal of Jews' College he would be succeeded by Jacobs. When this assumption was translated into a definite invitation by the College's Board of Trustees in 1961, the then Chief Rabbi of the United Kingdom, Israel Brodie, interdicted the appointment "because of his [Jacobs's] published views". This was a reference to We Have Reason to Believe.

The British newspaper, The Jewish Chronicle, took up the issue and turned it into a cause célèbre which was reported in the national press, including The Times. It was

an event that threatened to become the biggest schism in Anglo-Jewish history. The events in 1964 that came to be known as "the Jacobs Affair" dominated not just the Jewish media but the whole of Fleet Street and the newsrooms of both the BBC and ITN. Not that Jacobs himself was a willing participant in the affair. He was dragged into it by the religious establishment of the day.

When Jacobs wished to return to his pulpit at the New West End Synagogue, Brodie vetoed his appointment. A number of members then left the New West End Synagogue to found the New London Synagogue.

Public interest in Jacobs's differences with the Anglo-Jewish establishment is also demonstrated by the television interview of Dr. Jacobs of 1966 conducted by Bernard Levin.

== The New London Synagogue ==
The defecting congregation purchased the old St John's Wood synagogue building, and installed Jacobs as its rabbi – a post which he held until 2001 and to which he returned in 2005. This congregation, The New London Synagogue, became the "parent" of the Masorti movement (a non Orthodox community) in the United Kingdom, which now numbers several congregations.

While holding the position of rabbi at the New London Synagogue, Dr Jacobs was also for many years Lecturer in Talmud and Zohar at the Leo Baeck College, a rabbinical college preparing students to serve as Masorti, Reform and Liberal clergy in the UK and Europe. Rabbi Jacobs served as Chairman of the Academic Committee for some years.

When the Masorti Movement in Britain was created its founders asked him to be its spiritual guide. Despite his ambivalence about the need and purpose of a new movement, he agreed. But he refused to be regarded as its founder. He always described Masorti as a mood not a movement".

Since the founding of the New London Synagogue, Jacobs and the Masorti movement were subject to hostility from Orthodox British Jewish institutions. On his 83rd birthday, in the Bournemouth United Synagogue on the sabbath before his granddaughter's wedding, Jacobs was not provided the honour of an aliyah customarily given to the father of the bride, which gave rise to heated correspondence in the Jewish press including accusations of pettiness and vindictiveness. The Chief Rabbi, Lord Jonathan Sacks, and the head of the London Beth Din, Dayan Chanoch Ehrentreu, responded that, because of what they considered to be Jacobs's heretical beliefs, "they believed that had Jacobs uttered the words 'Our God […] who gave us the Torah of truth […] ', he would have made a false statement".

== Witness for Chabad-Lubavitch ==
Jacobs testified on behalf of the Chabad Lubavitch movement during the Chabad library controversy. Being an acknowledged scholar on Chasidism, Jacobs was called as an expert witness to testify on the Chabad practice of "ma'amad" (support), the method by which the members of the Chabad community supported their Rebbe.

Jacobs testified that "[ma'mad] is a due, for which every member of the movement is expected to consider himself responsible, and ... there is an amount according to means which every member pays or is expected to pay. It is best compared to membership dues of a learned society or a sacred society, and the dues are expected as [a] token of membership." Jacobs noted that other Chasidic groups support their Rebbes by gifts known as "pidyon" (redemption) or "pidyon nefesh" (redemption of the soul) delivered personally to a rebbe. Pidyon is understood by Jacobs as "a personal gift, as it were ... for [spiritual] services rendered."

== Death and legacy ==
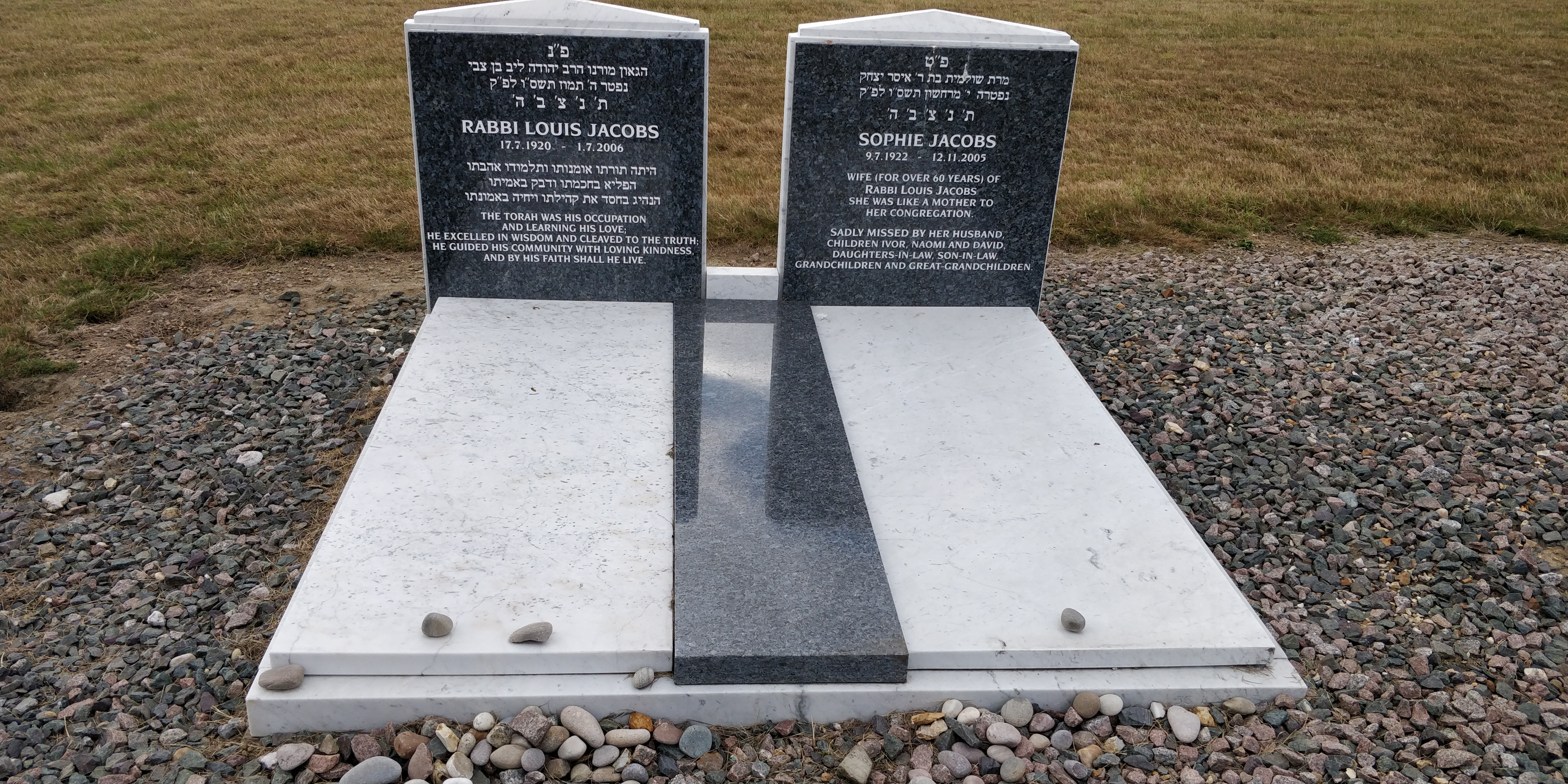
Graves of Rabbi Louis Jacobs and his wife Sophie

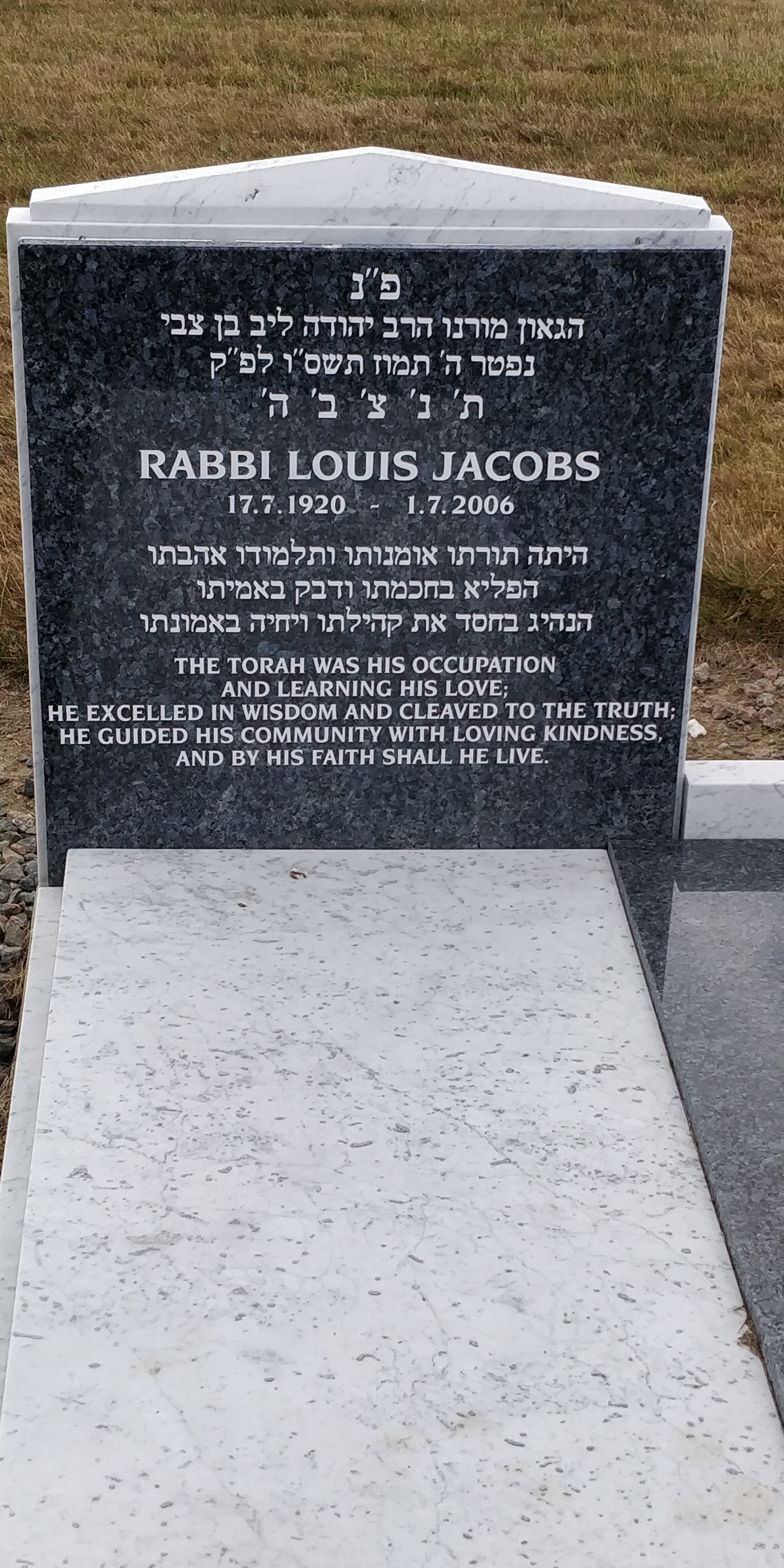
Rabbi Louis Jacobs' grave

Jacobs died on 1 July 2006 and is buried at Western Cemetery (Cheshunt) alongside his wife Sophie (Shulamit) Jacobs (1921–2005), whom he married in 1944.

A few months before he died, Jacobs donated his book collection to the Leopold Muller Memorial Library at the Oxford Centre for Hebrew and Jewish Studies.

In December 2005, a poll by The Jewish Chronicle of its subscribers, in which 2,000 readers made their nominations, voted Jacobs the "greatest British Jew" in the community's 350-year history in England. Jacobs commented "I feel greatly honoured – and rather daft." Nevertheless, reports that Louis Jacobs had been nominated greatest British Jew received wide press coverage in Britain.

== Selected publications ==
- Jewish Prayer
- We Have Reason to Believe (1957, revised editions in 1961 and 1965)
- Jewish Values
- Jewish Thought Today (Chain of Tradition Series, Vol. 3)
- Studies in Talmudic Logic (and Methodology) (1961)
- Principles of the Jewish Faith (An Analytic Study) (1964)
- A Jewish Theology
- Jewish Ethics, Philosophy and Mysticism
- Tract on Ecstasy
- Hasidic Prayer
- The Jewish Mystics (1990)
- The Book of Jewish Belief
- Faith (1968)
- What does Judaism say about ...? (The New York Times Library of Jewish Knowledge)
- The Jewish Religion: A Companion (1995), Oxford University Press, ISBN 0-19-826463-1
- Turn Aside from Evil and Do Good: An Introduction and a Way to the Tree of Life (1995), Littman Library of Jewish Civilization, ISBN 1-874774-10-2(c); ISBN 978-1-874774-11-2 (p) (author Zevi Hirsch Eichenstein, translation by Louis Jacobs).

== Sources ==
- Jacobs, Louis. Helping With Inquiries (autobiography) (1989) ISBN 0-85303-231-9
- Jacobs, Louis (1965). We have Reason to Believe (3rd ed.). London: Vallentine Mitchell.
