= Laura Janner-Klausner =

British rabbi

The Honourable Rabbi Laura Janner-Klausner לוֹרָה ג׳אָנֶר-קלְוֹזנֶר
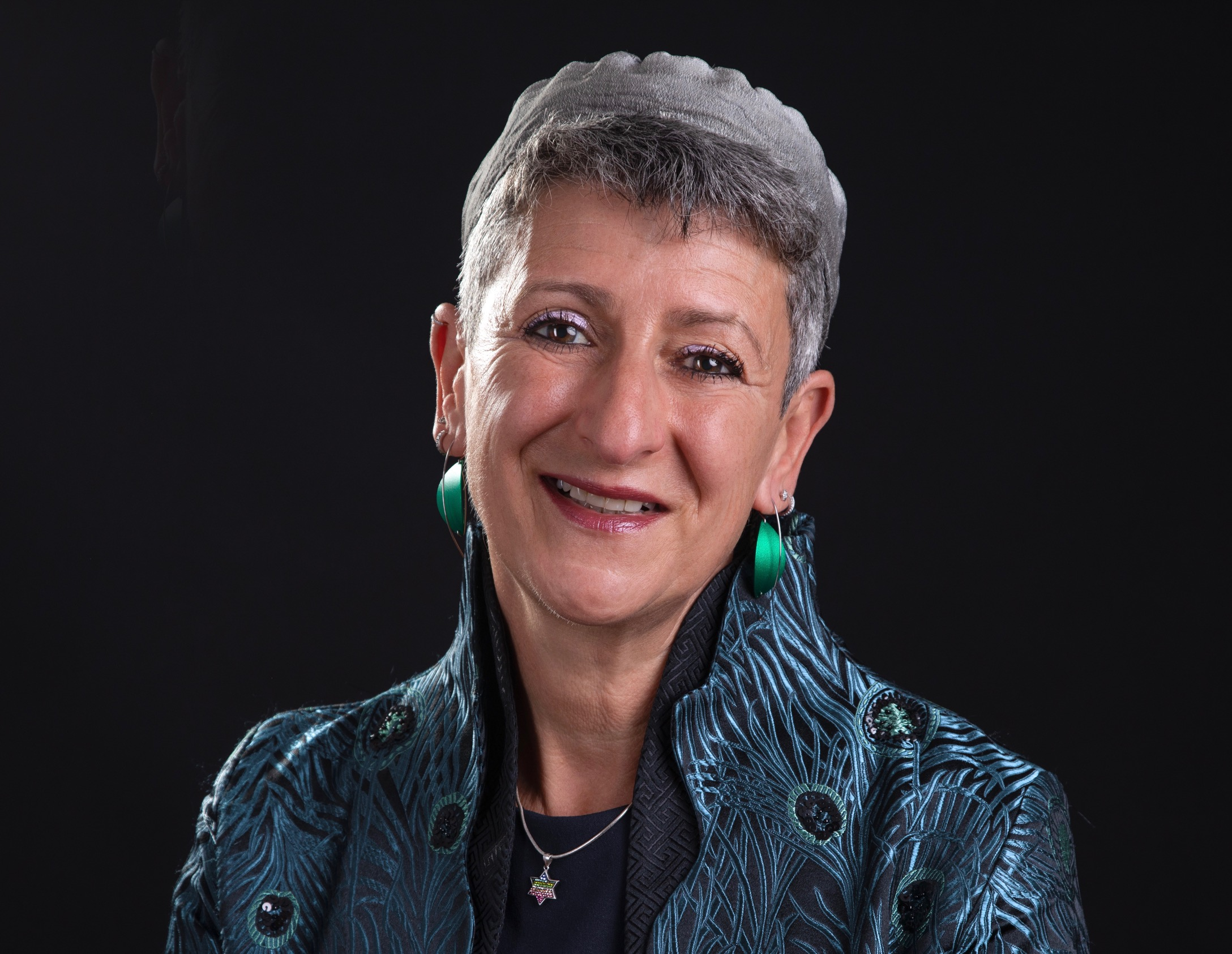

Personal life
- Born: Laura Janner; 1 August 1963 (age 63) London, England
- Spouse: David Janner-Klausner
- Parent(s): Lord Janner of Braunstone, Myra Sheink JP
- Education: University of Cambridge, Hebrew University, Jewish Theological Seminary, Brandeis University, Leo Baeck College
- Occupation: Rabbi-Coach
- Website: www.rabbilaura.org

Religious life
- Religion: Judaism
- Denomination: Reform Judaism

Jewish leader
- Predecessor: Position created
- Position: Senior Rabbi
- Organisation: Movement for Reform Judaism
- Began: January 2011
- Ended: September 2020

Laura Naomi Janner-Klausner (Hebrew: לוֹרָה ג׳אָנֶר-קלְוֹזנֶר; born 1 August 1963) is a British rabbi and an inclusion and development coach who served as the inaugural Senior Rabbi to Reform Judaism from 2011 until 2020. Janner-Klausner grew up in London before studying theology at the University of Cambridge and moving to Israel in 1985, living in Jerusalem for 15 years. She returned to Britain in 1999 and was ordained at Leo Baeck College, serving as rabbi at Alyth Synagogue (North Western Reform Synagogue) until 2011. She has been serving as Rabbi at Bromley Reform Synagogue in south-east London since April 2022.

Janner-Klausner represents a progressive Jewish voice to British Jewry and the wider public, speaking on affairs including Israel-Palestine, social justice, same-sex marriage and interfaith relations. Janner-Klausner is a regular broadcaster on programmes such as BBC Radio 4’s Thought for the Day, BBC Radio 2’s Pause for Thought and BBC One’s The Big Questions and Sunday Morning Live. In November 2014, an article by Jewish journalist Jessica Elgot in The Huffington Post opined that Janner-Klausner was "fast becoming the most high-profile Jewish leader in the country" and described her as "wildly likeable, emphatic, intense, and outspoken". In 2018 she featured in The Progress 1000 list of London's most influential people. She has written a book on the theme of resilience, Bitesize Resilience: A Crisis Survival Guide, which was launched on 7 May 2020. She is co-chair of the Global Interfaith Commission on LGBT+ Lives and an honorary fellow of The Edward Cadbury Centre for the Public Understanding of Religion at the University of Birmingham. She is also a Fellow of the Royal Society of Arts.

== Life and career ==
=== Early life and education ===
Janner-Klausner was raised in north London and attended South Hampstead High School. As a young girl, Janner-Klausner regularly travelled to constituency surgeries at the weekends with her father, Greville Janner, a QC and then a Labour Member of Parliament. Janner-Klausner's great-uncle, Emeritus Chief Rabbi of Great Britain, Sir Israel Brodie, had a profound influence on her growing up. Her siblings are Marion Janner OBE, a mental health campaigner, and Daniel Janner KC, a barrister.

Initially a member of Hampstead Garden Suburb Synagogue, a congregation affiliated to the United Synagogue of Orthodox British Jews, Janner-Klausner has frequently cited her bat mitzvah as a pivotal moment. She was so disaffected by the experience that she left Hampstead Garden Suburb Synagogue the very next day. Janner-Klausner subsequently became involved in youth activities at Alyth Gardens Reform Synagogue near Golders Green, developing a passion for Reform Judaism's values of egalitarianism and social justice and expressing interest in becoming a Rabbi as young as 13.

Janner-Klausner spent her gap year in Israel and was a representative of British Reform Judaism at Machon L'Madrichei Chutz La'Aretz (The Institute for Youth Leaders from Abroad). She returned to London in 1982 and became a founding member of RSY-Netzer, which is now the largest Jewish youth movement in the United Kingdom.

Janner-Klausner studied divinity at Trinity Hall, Cambridge (the alma mater of her father and brother), where she was taught by Rowan Williams, later Archbishop of Canterbury. She studied alongside Linda Woodhead, now Professor in the sociology of religion at Lancaster University. Janner-Klausner was on the Union of Jewish Students executive and ran her university's Israel Society and Progressive Jewish Society. She graduated with a degree in Theological and Religious Studies from the University of Cambridge in 1985.

=== Career in Israel ===
Following her graduation, aged 22, Janner-Klausner moved to Israel and began teaching Jewish history, Judaism and youth leadership at the Machon L'Madrichei Chutz La'Aretz. She worked there continuously until 1998 and later became the Director of its English-speaking department.

Janner-Klausner began working in 1992 at Melitz, an educational centre specialising in Jewish peoplehood based in Jerusalem, and later served as Director of the Centre for Christian Encounters with Israel, where she helped train Palestinian tour guides in Bethlehem and Jerusalem. She also led Israeli-Palestinian dialogue facilitation for the European Union’s "The People's Peace" programme, following the Oslo I Accord of 1993.

Before returning to live in London, Janner-Klausner had studied at the Jewish Theological Seminary in Jerusalem and acquired postgraduate degrees in Community Centre Management at the Hebrew University and Jewish Communal Service with a focus on Jewish education at Brandeis University, Massachusetts.

=== Return to London ===
Janner-Klausner returned to London in 1999 with her husband David and their three children, citing the ideological intensity of living in Jerusalem as a primary reason. She soon began training to become a rabbi at Leo Baeck College, serving many congregations as a trainee rabbi – including Alyth Synagogue (North Western Reform Synagogue), the synagogue where she had developed a passion for Reform Judaism and its egalitarian values as a teenager. Following her ordination, Janner-Klausner became Rabbi at Alyth.

Janner-Klausner featured in a BBC radio series presented by Jonathan Freedland in 2008 entitled British Jews and the Dream of Zion, discussing the 1947 United Nations Partition Plan for Palestine. She then began to broadcast regularly on programmes such as BBC Radio 4's Today programme (in the Thought for the Day slot) and BBC One's The Big Questions.

Whilst Rabbi at Alyth, Janner-Klausner began chairing British Friends of Rabbis for Human Rights, an Israeli human rights organisation. By 2011, she had served for eight years as Rabbi at Alyth, a community with 3000 members.

=== Senior Rabbi to Reform Judaism ===
In July 2011, Janner-Klausner became first Senior Rabbi to Reform Judaism, a position initially entitled "Movement Rabbi". Chair-elect of Reform Judaism, Jenny Pizer, said Janner-Klausner was "an influential broadcaster and writer, a great teacher and a popular rabbi of one of our flourishing communities".

The Assembly of Reform Rabbis created the position to increase the voice of Reform Judaism and represent its constituent communities on a national level, both within the British Jewish community and general public.

Shortly after being appointed, Janner-Klausner set improving periodically fraught relations between the Orthodox and Reform Judaism as part of her agenda. On the selection of Ephraim Mirvis as Chief Rabbi of the United Hebrew Congregations in December 2012, Janner-Klausner said: "I welcome the appointment of Rabbi Mirvis as another powerful voice for British Jewry. I look forward to working closely with him as a partner on areas of common interests to the Jewish and wider community". Janner-Klausner has since said of Rabbi Mirvis: "he made some very positive noises about inclusivity and working together and it was really well received. It’s not playing out in reality, unfortunately."

In November 2014, Janner-Klausner featured in "Beyond Belief" by The Huffington Post, a series of interviews with Britons who use faith "to create a force for positive change". The article, entitled "How Britain's Only Female Head Of Faith Took On The Religious Establishment, And Won", explored Janner-Klausner's early life and professional career. It reported that she had dramatically improved the status of Reform Judaism in Britain and was "fast becoming the most high-profile Jewish leader in the country".

On 7 July 2020, Janner-Klausner announced she would be stepping down as Senior Rabbi to Reform Judaism. Reform Judaism Chair, Geoffrey Marx, said she had "transformed Reform Judaism" and "that her work has made Britain better".

=== Bitesize Resilience: A Crisis Survival Guide ===
In May 2020, Janner-Klausner published her book Bitesize Resilience: A Crisis Survival Guide. The book draws upon her pastoral experience as a Rabbi, and her personal experience of dealing with the allegations made against her father, to offer day-by-day guide to building resilience. As the book was completed during the 2020 coronavirus pandemic, Janner-Klausner opted to use its release to encourage donations to the Molly Rose Foundation.

On 18 June 2020, Janner-Klausner was announced as the chair of the judging panel for the 2021 Wingate Literary Prize, described as "one of the Jewish world's top literary prizes".

In 2022, it was announced that Janner-Klausner would return to the pulpit as the congregational rabbi at Bromley Reform Synagogue from April.

== Advocacy and views ==
=== Interfaith relations ===
Janner-Klausner is a prominent voice on British interfaith relations and regularly meets representatives of Christian and Muslim communities. She is a President of the Council of Christians and Jews and has worked with organisations including the Three Faiths Forum and the Interfaith Network for the UK. Having studied Christian theology at university, Janner-Klausner has worked with the Methodist Church, the Church of Scotland and the Quakers to deepen interfaith ties.

In May 2013, following the murder of Lee Rigby, Janner-Klausner joined faith leaders in solidarity with Woolwich residents and its Muslim community at the Greenwich Islamic Centre. With far-right groups including the English Defence League and British National Party organising protests in response to the murder by a Muslim extremist, she stated that "a single extreme act... does not reflect on the wider British Muslim community".

=== LGBT+ ===
Janner-Klausner strongly supports same-sex marriage, which she calls "equal marriage". Referring to the legalisation of gay marriage, Janner-Klausner said "our starting point, middle point and finishing point is about equality". In March 2014, same-sex marriage was legalised in Britain. Janner-Klausner signed an open letter from Christian and Jewish faith leaders including Danny Rich, chief executive of Liberal Judaism, and Alan Wilson, the Bishop of Buckingham, voicing support for gay marriage. The leaders said they would "rejoice" in the introduction of gay marriage. Janner-Klausner has been recognised as a religious leader in the area of anti-LGBT+ discrimination and has been appointed to the Ozanne Foundation's Inter-Religious Advisory Board.

=== Refugees ===
Janner-Klausner has emerged as one of the leading British religious voices on the issue of refugee rights. She was involved in bringing the issue to public prominence, writing in August 2015 that "when Jewish people look at Calais migrants, we see ourselves" and being one of the leading voices in a letter signed by over 200 Jewish representatives labelling the government's response "appalling". Janner-Klausner was especially vocal on the topic of the Calais Jungle, visiting on multiple occasions. In September 2015, a short film was made documenting Janner-Klausner visiting the Jungle alongside Imam Qari Muhammad Asim. During debate over the Dubs Amendment to the Immigration Bill to grant 3,000 unaccompanied child refugees entry to the UK, Janner-Klausner spoke extensively in its favour. She was at the forefront of a letter signed by many Rabbinic leaders calling for the Dubs Amendment to be adopted and spoke out alongside Jewish leaders from a range of denominations after the amendment was initially rejected, saying "I believe Britain has the capacity and the will to do more during this crisis". In September 2016, she addressed a crowd of 10,000 people at a Solidarity with Refugees rally in Trafalgar Square.

Internationally, Rabbi Janner-Klausner has spoken out against the treatment of refugees crossing the US-Mexico border by the Trump administration, saying "the numbing of empathy, the dehumanisation of other people through the encouragement of disdain are documented stages in history that have led to atrocities and even genocides".

=== Israel ===
Janner-Klausner is a progressive Zionist and considers Israel the spiritual and intellectual centre of Judaism and the Jewish people. She supports two states for Israel and Palestine as the sustainable and just solution to the present conflict, having facilitated Israeli-Palestinian dialogue for the European Union whilst living in Jerusalem and led tours to the West Bank with British Friends of Rabbis for Human Rights. She is a past chair of British Friends of Rabbis for Human Rights.

=== Religious power ===
Janner-Klausner is especially interested in the relationship between religion and power. She has criticised religious fundamentalists, proposing that literalist interpretations of religious text "worship words instead of God". At the Bath Literature Festival in March 2013, she spoke about the importance of challenging religious belief and suggested "we need to lock faith and doubt together".

At the Limmud Conference in December 2013, Janner-Klausner delivered a JDOV speech about "Power and its Discontents", addressing themes of power and powerlessness in Judaism. Before the speech at JDOV or "Jewish Dreams, Observations and Visions", a British Jewish organisation inspired by TED talks, she wrote: "I strongly believe in inverting the power pyramid so that everyone claims their opportunity to play their part in decisions that affect themselves and their communities".

== Personal life ==
Janner-Klausner was introduced by an aunt to her husband, David, in Jerusalem in 1986. They married in 1988 and have three children. Dr David Janner-Klausner was Programme and Planning Director at the United Jewish Israel Appeal and currently works as Director of Business Development at Commonplace Digital Ltd. He is the brother of Amos Oz, the Israeli author.

Janner-Klausner speaks fluent Hebrew.

== Recognition ==
She was recognised as one of the BBC's 100 women of 2013.

== See also ==
- Movement for Reform Judaism
- Reform Judaism
- British Jews
- Israelis in the United Kingdom
