= Senitt =

Senitt is a surname. Notable people with the surname include:

- Alan Senitt (1978–2006), British political activist
- Catherine Senitt (born 1945), Canadian artist
