= Solicitor advocate =

Legal occupation

Solicitor advocate is a hybrid status which allows a solicitor in the United Kingdom and Hong Kong to represent clients in higher courts in proceedings that were traditionally reserved for barristers. The status does not exist in most other common law jurisdictions where, for the most part, all solicitors have rights of audience in higher courts.

The title is also used in some jurisdictions to refer to solicitors who conduct advocacy in court (such as Northern Ireland) or as a job title (Australia).

== Origin ==
Historically in the United Kingdom, solicitors took conduct of litigation, and undertook advocacy in the lower courts (tribunals, coroner's courts, magistrates' courts, county courts, and sheriff courts). They were not able to represent their clients in court in the higher courts: the Crown Court, the High Court, the Court of Appeal, the Court of Session, the Privy Council, and the Judicial Committee of the House of Lords (today known as the UK Supreme Court). Instead, solicitors were required to instruct barristers (in England and Wales) or advocates (in Scotland) to represent their clients in court.

Section 27 of the Courts and Legal Services Act 1990, in England and Wales, and section 24 of the Law Reform (Miscellaneous Provisions) (Scotland) Act 1990, in Scotland, created a route for solicitors to qualify for a grant of rights of audience in the higher courts when they have sufficient training and experience, subject to passing additional exams. The complex rules and regulations were relaxed in England and Wales by the Higher Courts Qualification Regulations 2000 so as to establish four main routes to qualify for higher rights of audience: development (training, assessment, and a portfolio of cases); accreditation (experience and an advocacy assessment); exemption (sufficient experience); and former barrister (called to the bar before 31 July 2000). Higher rights of audience may be granted for the higher criminal courts, or the higher civil courts, or both.

== Practice in the UK today ==
=== England and Wales ===
Solicitor higher court advocacy has developed significantly since its first authorisation by the Courts and Legal Services Act 1990. Although only a handful of solicitors acquired higher rights as the first batch of advocates in 1994, they included some of the most senior figures in the legal establishment of the time, such as Sir David Napley, founding partner of London law firm Kingsley Napley. Approximately 7,000 advocates have since been authorised for crime, civil, or both. They represent a wide spectrum of experience.

Whilst there has been a steady growth of numbers in recent years, the bulk of the serious advocacy is still undertaken by solicitor advocates with many years of advocacy practice behind them. Some solicitor advocates have been working exclusively in higher courts for fifteen years (or longer if former barristers) and have developed particular specialisms, for example in regulatory and disciplinary work such as Andrew Hopper KC; in family work, such as June Venters KC; in extradition cases, such as Michael Caplan KC; and elsewhere in various parts of the criminal field, such as in terrorism work and fraud; e.g., Niall Quinn KC.

Solicitor advocates are regularly appointed to the ranks of King's Counsel, albeit the numbers of applicants are relatively low. Solicitor advocates have also been appointed to the High Court bench. The Baron Collins of Mapesbury, a former Herbert Smith partner, was the first appointee as a solicitor KC in 1997 before being appointed to the High Court bench. In 2009 he was appointed to the UK Supreme Court.

The bar and judiciary have been generally supportive of the growth of solicitor advocacy, asserting that the bar would not be threatened by individuals acquiring new skills and practices; and that the ethnic, gender and class diversity that this wider pool of advocates would bring to the profession would be welcome. But, in recent years the bar has found its work being reduced, partly as a result of Legal Aid cuts principally directed at solicitors' firms, and this has generally soured its opinion of the changes.

Instruction of solicitor advocates became more prevalent as firms saw the advantages of keeping work in-house without the need to instruct outside counsel. This pioneering approach is frequently seen across England and Wales, particularly in areas such as Birmingham. The previous monopoly of counsel in higher court advocacy led to complacency by some; late withdrawal from serious cases of the counsel of choice remain relatively frequent due to other work commitments. Occasionally this was accompanied by an attempt to foist upon both solicitor and client a new counsel with no previous involvement in the case. Practice choices such as these worked to the benefit of solicitor advocates, who had the advantage of appreciating the consequences of such behaviour and of knowing the client. Equally, the independent bar met with some limited competition from chambers of solicitor advocates, independent practitioners with common clerking and conference facilities who operated in a similar way to barristers, but with less aggressive clerking arrangements so that late return of briefs was relatively unusual.

Competition has led to criticism from the bar and judiciary of the extent of solicitor advocacy practised in the higher courts, particularly as solicitor advocates are regulated by the Solicitors Regulation Authority or Law Society of Scotland rather than the Faculty of Advocates or Bar Standards Board. Solicitor advocates have a code for advocacy which is almost identical to the Bar code of conduct. Criticism is levelled against solicitor advocates due to the possibility that defendants' interests may not be best protected by an advocate who also works for the solicitors employed by the defendant. The role of counsel is to act as an independent party and advise the defendant if the solicitor is not acting in the best interests of the client.

=== Scotland ===
Despite these arrangements, which have been in place since 1994, there have been attacks on the principle of solicitor advocacy from some quarters, both north and south of the border. In the Scottish case of Woodside v HMA [2009] HCJAC 19, the High Court in Scotland was critical of some aspects of practice by solicitor advocates. But, the appeal in question failed on a ground related to the allegedly "defective" representation of the solicitor advocates instructed at trial. The case dealt with the conduct of a trial over 10 years earlier. In any event the decision was welcomed by the Society of Solicitor Advocates, who suggested that it would be appropriate to have a review of all issues relating to rights of audience, including those involving the Faculty of Advocates.

At a SGM of the Society of Solicitor Advocates on 22 April 2009, they passed a resolution in respect of consideration of the Woodside case. The resolution stated:

The Society notes the Solicitors (Scotland)(Standards of Conduct) Practice Rules 2008 and in particular the duties of independence, to act in the interests of their clients, to avoid acting where a conflict of interest arises, and to act only where competent to do so.

The Society also notes the Rules of Conduct for Solicitor Advocates 2002 and in particular the rules relating to the acceptance of instructions.

The Society also notes that it is desirable that common principles should apply in relation to the exercising of rights of audience by all practitioners appearing before the Court of Session and the High Court of Justiciary – section 25A(8) of the Solicitors (Scotland) Act 1980 – as are reflected in the Rules of Conduct for Solicitor Advocates and the Guide to Professional Conduct of Advocates.

The Society also notes the comments of the judges in the High Court of Justiciary in the case of 'Alexander Woodside v Her Majesty's Advocate' [2009] HCJAC 19

The Society affirms

1. The resolution of the 2008 Law Society AGM to seek to repeal the Solicitors (Scotland) (Supreme Courts) Practice Rules 2003.
2. The duty of solicitors to advise their clients on appropriate representation before all courts.
3. The duty of both solicitors and solicitor advocates to act on behalf of clients independently, in particularly of their own interests or the interests of their colleagues.
4. The right of solicitor advocates to accept instructions to represent clients in all courts from solicitors with whom the solicitor advocates are in a business relationship.
5. The duty of solicitors to instruct such representation in court, including such combination of representation, as is appropriate to the circumstances of the case.

The Society therefore instructs the Council of the Law Society to promulgate rules repealing the Solicitors (Scotland)(Supreme Courts) Practice Rules 2003.

The motion was withdrawn at the Law Society's AGM, due to the announcement that there would be a review of rights of audience generally, as requested by the Society of Solicitor Advocates.

The increasing workload and recognition of solicitor advocates has led to changes in the law profession. Some law students elect to train as solicitor advocates rather than barristers. The Law Society Gazette has noted that a number of solicitors decide very early in their careers to qualify as solicitor advocates.

=== Northern Ireland ===
Part 8 of the Justice Act (Northern Ireland) 2011 (the 2011 Act) provides for the authorisation by the Law Society of Northern Ireland of solicitors who have completed certain training to have rights of audience in the higher courts. The Law Society is required to make regulations with regard to the education, training and experience which a solicitor must possess before authorisation can be granted. These regulations are subject to the concurrence of the Lord Chief Justice and the Department of Justice which must consult with the Attorney General. Regulations have not been issued and the system has yet to come into effect.

The draft Code of Conduct for Solicitor Advocates issued by the Law Society of Northern Ireland defines "advocates” as any solicitors exercising their right of audience in any court. The term "solicitor advocate", therefore has a broader meaning in Northern Ireland than in England & Wales and Scotland.

== Hong Kong ==
Hong Kong has since the 1860s followed the English tradition of only allowing barristers a general right to appear in open court in the higher courts. The only general exception has been that government counsel (called legal officers), whether admitted as a barrister or solicitor have had higher rights of audience for many years in matters in which the Hong Kong government has an interest. Solicitors have been allowed to appear in chambers in the Court of First Instance and Court of Appeal on interlocutory matters and in open court in the Court of First Instance on non-contested matters or in an emergency.

In 2010, amendments were passed to the Legal Practitioners Ordinance allowing solicitors to apply to become solicitor advocates. This was the result of proposals made originally in 1995 and moved before the Legislative Council in 1996. The amendments did not proceed at that time because the President of LegCo ruled that the amendments exceeded the scope of the Bill and could not be proposed. In 2007, the Chief Justice convened a working party on Higher Rights of Audience which recommended a system be introduced to allow for solicitors to become solicitor advocates.

The new system established a Higher Rights Assessment Board to which solicitors can apply to represent clients in the higher courts in criminal and/or civil proceedings. Applicants may apply either by way of exemption (due to their having significant advocacy experience) or by assessment.

The first applications were received in 2013 and it was reported in the South China Morning Post, a Hong Kong newspaper, that "[i]n 2013, only 15 out of 90 solicitors who applied to represent their clients in the higher courts were granted the status of solicitor advocates".

As at September 2026, 119 Hong Kong solicitors had been granted higher rights of audience. 6 solicitors have obtained higher rights of audience in criminal cases and 112 in civil cases. One solicitor has obtained higher rights of audience in civil and criminal cases.

== Court dress ==
In England and Wales, solicitor advocates wear a gown, winged collar and bands, and may also wear a wig in circumstances where they are worn by barristers.

In Scotland they wear a gown over business dress, but no wig, in line with other Scottish solicitors.

In Hong Kong, in hearings where advocates are required to be robed, solicitor advocates wear a solicitor's gown, winged collar and bands. They are not permitted to wear a wig.
