= North Western Reform Synagogue =

Reform Jewish congregation and synagogue in London, England

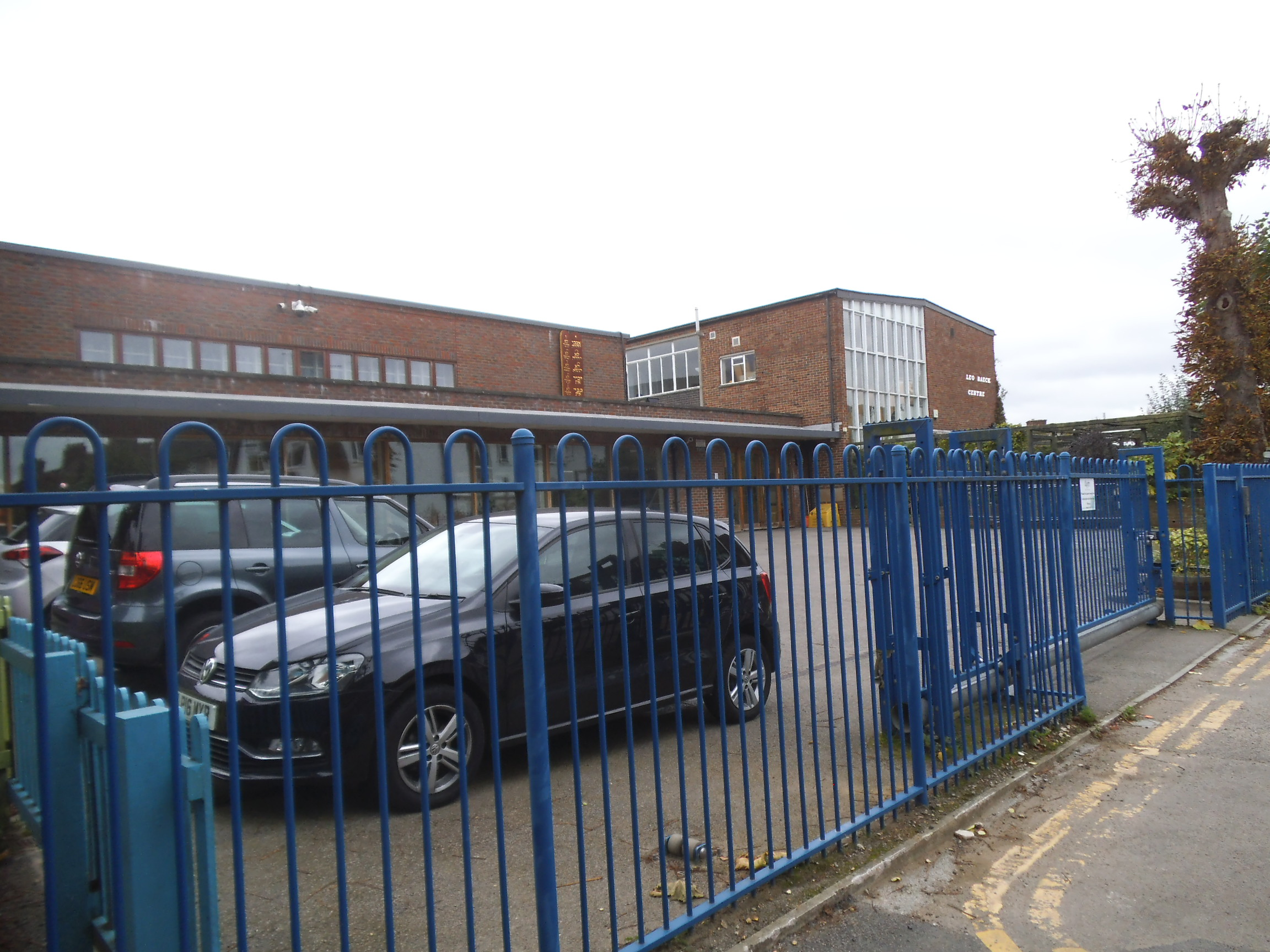

- Location of the synagogue in Greater London

Religion
- Affiliation: Reform Judaism
- Ecclesiastical or organisational status: Synagogue
- Leadership: Rabbi Golan Ben-Chorin; Rabbi Hannah Kingston; Rabbi Elliott Karstadt; Rabbi Colin Eimer; Rabbi Josh Levy (Emeritus)
- Status: Active

Location
- Location: Alyth Gardens, Temple Fortune, Golders Green, Borough of Barnet, London, England NW11 7EN
- Country: United Kingdom
- Coordinates: 51°34′46″N 0°11′47″W

Architecture
- Architect: Fritz Landauer
- Established: 1933 (as a congregation)
- Completed: 1936

Website
- alyth.org.uk

The North Western Reform Synagogue, commonly known as Alyth, (Note: Alyth is a name derived from the road on which the synagogue is located since 1936.) is a Reform Jewish congregation and synagogue, located at Temple Fortune, Golders Green, in the Borough of Barnet, north-west London, England, in the United Kingdom.

== Overview ==
Logo of the congregation

The congregation was founded in 1933. Its building, designed by the architect Fritz Landauer, was built in Alyth Gardens in 1936, on land carved out from the West London Synagogue’s cemetery in Hoop Lane. In 1942, the congregation became a founding member of Associated British Synagogues, now known as the Movement for Reform Judaism. With approximately 2,500 adult and 1,000 child members, the congregation is one of the largest Reform synagogues in the United Kingdom.

In 2021, its members approved a £6 million upgrade to the synagogue building, for completion in 2024.

== Clergy ==
The following individuals have served as rabbi of the congregation:

No.	Rabbi	Term start	Term end	Notes
1	Solomon Starrels	1933	1938	
2	Maurice Perlzweig	1938	1942	Also chair of the World Union of Jewish Students in 1933 and had helped to create the World Jewish Congress
−	Vivian Simmons	1942	1943	Acting, on secondment from West London Synagogue
3	Dr Werner van der Zyl	1943	1958	Also founder and president of Leo Baeck College
4	Philip Cohen	1958	1972	
5	Dow Marmur	1972	1983	
6	Charles Emanuel	1983	2003	
7	Laura Janner-Klausner	2003	2011	Became Senior Rabbi at the Movement for Reform Judaism in 2011
8	Mark Goldsmith	2006	2019	Became Senior Rabbi at Edgware & Hendon Reform Synagogue in 2019
9	Josh Levy	2008	2023	Emeritus; became Chief Executive of the Movement for Reform Judaism in 2023
10	Colin Eimer	2015	incumbent	
11	Hannah Kingston	2017	incumbent	
12	Elliott Karstadt	2020	incumbent	
13	Nicola Feuchtwang	2024	incumbent	
14	Greg Alexander	2026	incumbent	

== Notable members ==
- Leo Baeck, a German rabbi, scholar and theologian who served as president of the congregation from 1947 to 1956
- Norman Bentwich, a barrister and legal academic, who served as president of the congregation from 1958 to 1971
- Richard Hermer, Attorney General for England and Wales and Advocate General for Northern Ireland since July 2024
- Gabriel Pogrund, Sunday Times journalist notable for reporting on the UK's Covid-19 response and Labour Party politics

== See also ==
- History of the Jews in England
- List of Jewish communities in the United Kingdom
- List of synagogues in the United Kingdom
