= David Napley =

Sir David Napley
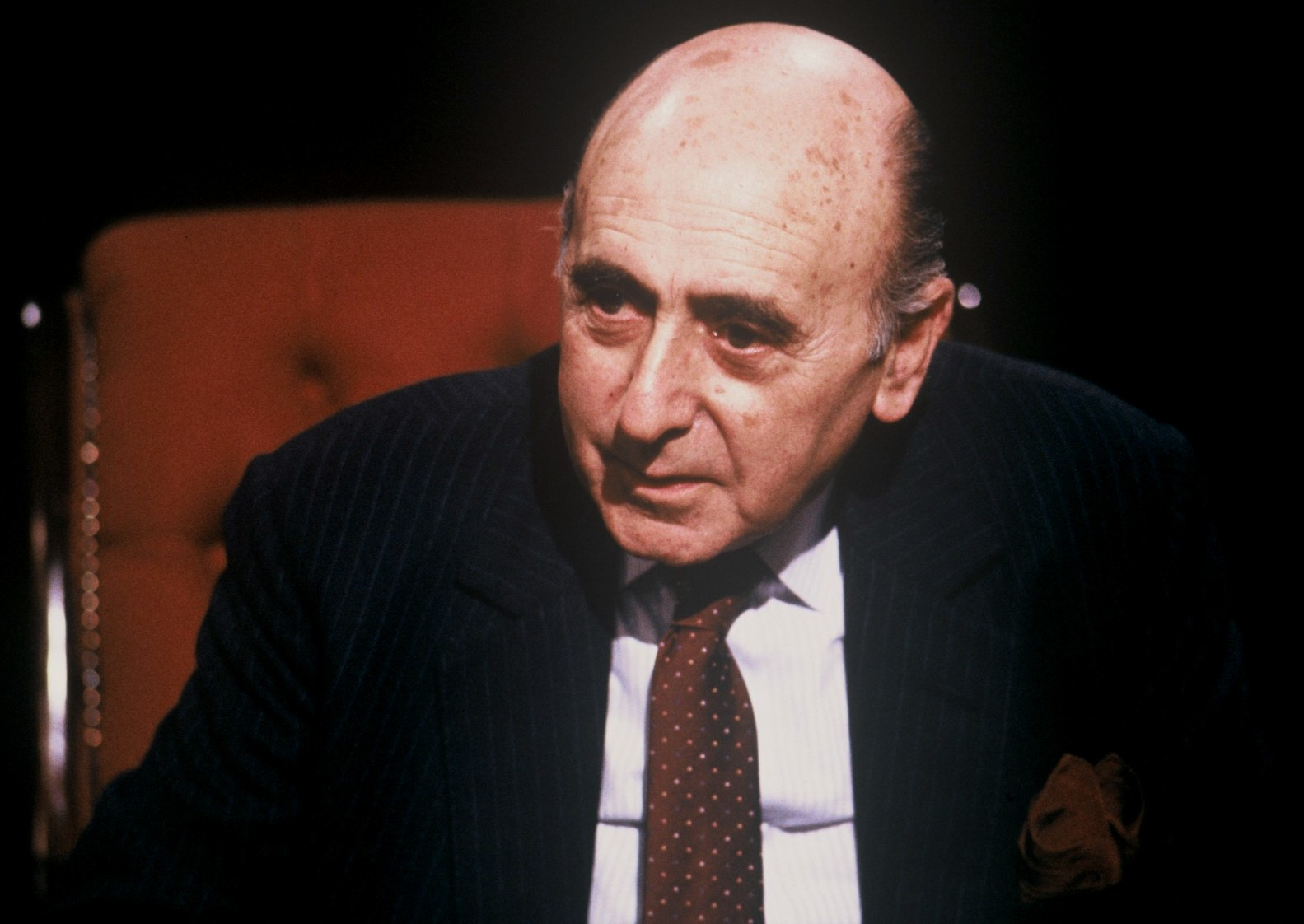
- On the TV programme After Dark in 1988 - "Beyond the Law"
- Born: 25 July 1915; London, England
- Died: 24 September 1994 (aged 79); Slough, England
- Occupation: Solicitor
- Spouse: Leah Rose Saturley
- Children: Anne Rosemary Josephine, Penelope Susan

Sir David Napley (25 July 1915 – 24 September 1994) was an English solicitor.

== Background ==
David Napley was born in London of Jewish ancestry. He began his articles (the equivalent of a modern-day training contract) in 1935 at age 16. He passed his final examinations with honours two years later and in 1937 immediately set up in partnership with Sidney Kingsley, establishing internationally recognised law firm Kingsley Napley. The firm quickly established a good reputation. Over the years his clients included Jeremy Thorpe, Princess Michael of Kent, actress Maria Aitken, the Foreign Office clerk Sarah Tisdall, former member of parliament Harvey Proctor, the Queen's bodyguard Commander Michael Trestrail, the family of the Italian banker Roberto Calvi and musician Adam "Ad-Rock" Horowitz from the Beastie Boys.

During the Second World War he served in India with the Queen's Royal Regiment (West Surrey) and was demobilised as a captain. On his return from the War he resumed practice as a solicitor and married his fiancée, Leah Rose Saturley, two years his junior. The couple lived in Mill Hill, in North-West London for many years.

The couple had two daughters, Anne Rosemary Josephine (born 14 August 1946) and Penelope Susan (born 28 October 1949).

Napley ran unsuccessful parliamentary campaigns as Conservative candidate in 1951 (Rowley Regis and Tipton) and 1955 (Gloucester). From 1968 to 1977 he was chairman of Mario and Franco Restaurants.

== Miscarriages of justice ==
Napley had a particular interest in miscarriages of justice. He was instrumental in setting up JUSTICE'S Annual Tom Sargant Memorial lecture and gave the first lecture in 1989. In that lecture he called for an independent tribunal to deal with miscarriage of justice cases. Partly as a result of Napley's reputation and wide-ranging influence, the Criminal Cases Review Commission was eventually established 14 years later.

Napley worked on several suspected miscarriages of justice cases, including the one-armed bandit murder case in the early seventies (which inspired the film Get Carter) and the Jock Russell case in 1982. Napley took the one-armed bandit murder case to the Court of Appeal twice and finally to the House of Lords. Napley also played a leading part in the formation of the British Academy of Forensic Sciences, which supports research into miscarriages of justice.

From 1963, Napley was chairman of the Law Society's Standing Committee on Criminal Law. From 1971 he served on the Criminal Law Revision Committee. He was vice-president of the Law Society of England and Wales from 1975 to 1976 and president from 1976 to 1977. Napley was knighted in 1977. In the same year he went to South Africa as an independent observer at the inquest into the death of Steve Biko.

In 1981, Napley reacted angrily to questions in Parliament because his client, Sir Peter Hayman was not being prosecuted despite having exchanged photos of children through the post. On 26 March 1981 Napley claimed that the decision not to prosecute his client was based on Attorney General Sir Michael Havers's decision to apply what Napley termed 'a customary factor' when deciding whether to prosecute a public figure:

whether the indirect punishment and hardship which a defendant may suffer is likely to be so disproportionate to the severity of the alleged offence and to any penalty imposed by a court that it would be unjust to prosecute.

This assertion, whereby the more famous the accused, the less likely they would be prosecuted for any offence, including child abuse offences, due to the steep loss of reputation they would suffer as a result, was questioned by the parliamentary journalist Ronald Butt as the corruption of the rule of law, and a "two tier system" as to who was subject to the law.

== Working relationship with George Carman ==
Napley was involved in raising the profile of the barrister George Carman. For many years, Carman was a well-respected barrister on the Northern Circuit but was relatively unknown in London. However, in November 1973, two years after Carman became a Queen's Counsel, Napley saw him at the Old Bailey defending a manager of Battersea Funfair. The man was charged with the manslaughter of four children after the Big Dipper collapsed. Carman secured a verdict of not guilty. At the time, Napley said "It seemed to me the jury were mesmerised." Napley determined to make further use of Carman; this was only the start of a long professional relationship between them.

Carman was still based in Manchester, however, and Napley briefed him only occasionally during the 1970s. However, in June 1978 Napley telephoned Carman to tell him that the former leader of the Liberal Party (UK), Jeremy Thorpe, was probably going to be committed for trial on charges of conspiracy to murder and that he was going to retain him. Thorpe was charged on 4 August 1978, resulting in a legal case that made Carman a household name.

In addition to retaining Carman to defend Thorpe, Napley also instructed him to advise Princess Michael of Kent; to defend Leonard Arthur in a trial where the paediatrician was acquitted of murdering a baby with Down's syndrome; to defend actress Maria Aitken on charges of cocaine possession, and to represent the Calvi family in the inquest of the Italian banker, Roberto Calvi. In 1991, Napley retained Carman to advise on a defence case for Greville Janner, later Lord Janner, if charges had been brought against him.

== Death ==
Napley died on 24 September 1994 from cancer in hospital in Slough, Berkshire, after an eight-week illness. Carman delivered the eulogy at his memorial service, attended by, among others, Baroness Thatcher.

== Works ==
- The Technique of Persuasion (1971): a work on advocacy and case preparation.
- Not Without Prejudice (1982): Napley's memoirs.
- Murder at the Villa Madeira: The Rattenbury Case (1988)
- The Camden Town Murder (1987)
