= Loretta Minghella =

British charity executive and solicitor

Loretta Minghella OBE

Master of Clare College, Cambridge
- Incumbent
- Assumed office October 2021
- Preceded by: Anthony Grabiner, Baron Grabiner

First Church Estates Commissioner
- In office November 2017 – October 2021
- Preceded by: Sir Andreas Whittam Smith
- Succeeded by: Alan Smith

Chief Executive of Christian Aid
- In office April 2010 – 2017

Personal details
- Born: 4 March 1962 (age 64) Isle of Wight, England
- Spouse: Christopher Parsons (m. 1992)
- Children: 2
- Education: Clare College, Cambridge; College of Law
- Profession: Solicitor and charity worker

Loretta Caroline Rose Minghella OBE (born 4 March 1962) is a British academic administrator and former charity executive. Since 2021, she has been Master of Clare College, Cambridge, her alma mater. Previously, she was the Chief Executive Officer of Christian Aid (April 2010 to 2017), and was the First Church Estates Commissioner (November 2017 to October 2021), one of the most senior lay people in the Church of England.

== Early life and education ==
Minghella was born on 4 March 1962 on the Isle of Wight, England, to Edward Minghella and Gloria Alberta Minghella. Her family ran a local café until the 1980s and an eponymous business making and selling Italian-style ice cream since the 1950s. She was one of five children, a brother being director Anthony Minghella, whose son Max is an actor. Minghella was educated at Medina High School, a state school in Newport, Isle of Wight. She studied law at Clare College, Cambridge, graduating with a Bachelor of Arts (BA) in 1984. She continued her studies at the College of Law.

== Career ==
From 1985 to 1987, Minghella was an articled clerk at London law firm Kingsley Napley. She was admitted as a solicitor in 1987 and continued to work at Kingsley Napley. From 1989 to 1990, she was a legal advisor to the Department of Trade and Industry.

From 1990 to 1993, having moved into financial regulation, Minghella was an assistant director of the Securities and Investments Board (SIB). From 1993 to 1998, she was head of enforcement law and policy at the SIB. From 1998 to 2004, she was head of enforcement law, policy and international cooperation for the Financial Services Authority (the successor to the SIB). From 2004 to 2010, she was chief executive of the Financial Services Compensation Scheme.

In April 2010, Minghella was appointed director (later chief executive) of Christian Aid. She was also a trustee of the Disasters Emergency Committee, and of the St George's House Trust. As CEO of Christian Aid, she was paid £119,123 in 2011 in the 2011/12 financial year and £126,072 in 2012/2013.

On 28 June 2017, it was announced that Minghella would be the next First Church Estates Commissioner, one of the most senior lay people in the Church of England, in succession to Sir Andreas Whittam Smith. She took up the appointment on 1 November 2017. As the First Church Estates Commissioner, she was a member of the Church Commissioners' Board of Governors, the General Synod of the Church of England, and the Archbishops' Council. Her main duty was serving as chair of the assets committee of the Church Commissioners which is responsible for managing an investment portfolio of £7.9 billion. She stepped down in 2021.

In November 2020, it was announced that she would become the next Master of Clare College, Cambridge in succession to Tony Grabiner: she took up the appointment in October 2021.

== Personal life ==
In 1992, Minghella married Christopher Parsons. Together they have two children: one son and one daughter.

Minghella is an Anglican Christian. She attends St Barnabas Church, Dulwich, London.

== Honours ==
In the 2010 New Year Honours, Minghella was appointed an Officer of the Order of the British Empire (OBE) "for services to the Financial Services Industry". In October 2016, she was made a Sarum Canon of Salisbury Cathedral, "recognising the contribution she has made to the national and worldwide Church".
