= Michael Caplan =

English solicitor

Michael G Caplan KC (born 1953 in Wandsworth, London) is an English solicitor.

== Biography ==
Caplan read law at King's College London (LLB, AKC), before undertaking study at The College of Law in London. Articled at Lickfolds Wiley & Powles, he qualified as a solicitor in 1977 and joined law firm Kingsley Napley in 1978, where he was a partner for 30 years and now serves as a Consultant. Caplan specialises in international criminal law and regulatory work. Taking silk in 2002, he is one of eight solicitors to have been appointed as King's Counsel.

One of the first Solicitor Advocates in the United Kingdom in 2002, and the first solicitor from a criminal law background to be made a KC, Caplan was one of those who contended that solicitor advocates should be entitled to wear the same wig and gown in court as barristers.

Caplan has commented on the proposed changes to the UK's Corporate manslaughter laws. He has also contributed to The Times Legal supplement. Caplan sits as a Recorder (judge) in the Crown Court, is a chairman of the police disciplinary appeal tribunal; and used to be chairman of the Solicitors Higher Courts Advocates Association.

=== High-profile cases ===
Caplan's work has included acting for:

- Douglas Henderson - acting for the Captain of the dredger Bowbelle in the River Thames Marchioness disaster enquiry.
- Augusto Pinochet - defended the former President of Chile from extradition from the United Kingdom to Spain.
- Kate and Gerry McCann' - is advising the couple after the disappearance of their daughter Madeleine McCann.
