= Kingsley Napley =

London law firm

- Headquarters: London, Moorgate
- No. of employees: Over 400
- Major practice areas: Criminal, Corporate, Clinical Negligence, Disputes, Employment, Family, Immigration, Private Client, Public Law, Regulatory, Real Estate
- Key people: James Fulforth (Senior Partner); Linda Woolley (Managing Partner); Jemimah Cook (HR Director); Leor Franks (BD Director); Darren Jesse (CFOO)
- Revenue: £61 million (2022/23)
- Date founded: 1937 (London)
- Company type: Limited liability partnership
- Website: kingsleynapley.co.uk

Kingsley Napley is a London-based law firm headquartered in Moorgate.

The firm is often cited by the mainstream media for comments and insights on notable cases, legal precedents, pro bono matters, and its business management practices.

Its famous clients have included media personality Rebekah Vardy, whom the firm represented during the "Wagatha Christie" trial, and Rebekah Brooks, former chief executive of News of the World, whom the firm represented during the News International phone hacking scandal.

== Overview ==
The firm's practice areas include Corporate, Commercial & Finance, Costs & Litigation Management, Criminal Litigation, Dispute Resolution, Employment, Family and Divorce, Immigration, Medical Negligence & Personal Injury, Private Client, Public Law, Real Estate & Construction, Regulatory, and Restructuring and Insolvency.

Kingsley Napley is authorised and regulated by the Solicitors Regulation Authority under registration number 500046.

The firm's clients include UK business leaders, entrepreneurs, athletes, entertainers, major corporations, former prime ministers, and members of Middle Eastern royal families.

== History ==
Kingsley Napley was founded in 1937 by Sir David Napley and Sidney Kingsley.

The firm’s early work focused on criminal and regulatory law. The firm became known for its work on notable criminal cases, including extraditions and white-collar crime. Over time, Kingsley Napley expanded its legal services to encompass a broader range of practice areas.

=== Recent developments ===
In 2021, the firm moved to its current offices at Bonhill Street. The same year, the firm modernised its logo, incorporating the strapline "When it matters most" to recognise that many of its clients rely on it in challenging situations.

In 2023, James Fulforth succeeded Stephen Parkinson as Senior Partner on his retirement. Parkinson was appointed Director of Public Prosecutions (England and Wales).

== Awards ==
Kingsley Napley has won recent industry awards including "Law firm of the year: The Independents" from The Lawyer, Private Client Team - Family Law Of The Year from the Modern Law Awards, and Contentious Wills and Probate Team of the Year at the British Wills and Probate Awards 2023.

The firm has 24 ranked departments in the 2024 Chambers and Partners UK legal directory. It also has numerous entries in Legal 500 and is commended in seven categories in The Times Best Law Firms 2024.

As an employer, the firm is notable for being highly ranked in Best Companies To Work For and winning the Workplace Wellbeing Award at the 2023 Modern Law Awards.

== Notable people ==
- Michael Caplan
- Angus McBride, News UK General Counsel
- Loretta Minghella
- Sir David Napley
- Stephen Parkinson, UK Director of Public Prosecutions
- Judge Kelly Rees
- Dave Rowntree, former Blur drummer
