= Bhikhu Parekh =

British political theorist (born 1935)

The Right Honourable The Lord Parekh FBA FAcSS FRSA
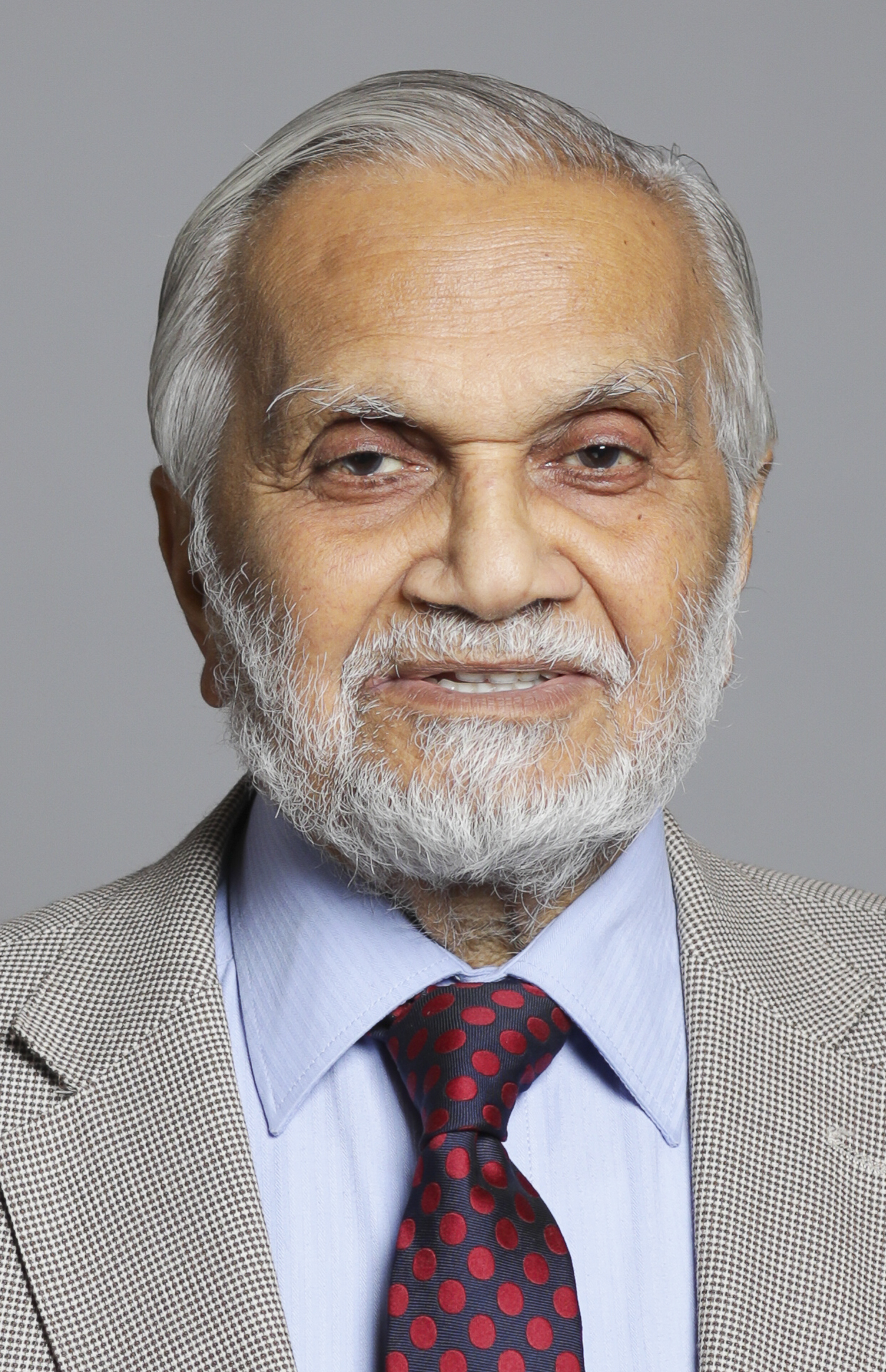
- Official portrait, 2020

Member of the House of Lords
- Lord Temporal
- Life peerage 10 May 2000

Personal details
- Born: Bhikhu Chhotalal Parekh; 4 January 1935 (age 91) Amalsad, Bombay Presidency, British India
- Citizenship: United Kingdom
- Party: Labour
- Children: Anant Parekh

Academic background
- Education: University of Bombay (BA, MA); London School of Economics (PhD)

Academic work
- Discipline: Political science
- Sub-discipline: Political history; political philosophy; Marxism; multiculturalism
- Institutions: London School of Economics; University of Glasgow; University of Hull; Maharaja Sayajirao University of Baroda; University of Westminster
- Notable works: Marx's Theory of Ideology (1982); Rethinking Multiculturalism: Cultural Diversity and Political Theory (2002)

Bhikhu Chhotalal Parekh, Baron Parekh (born 4 January 1935) is a British political theorist, academic, and life peer. He is a Labour Party member of the House of Lords. He was Professor of Political Theory at the University of Hull from 1982 to 2001, and Professor of Political Philosophy at the University of Westminster from 2001 to 2009. He served as president of the Academy of Social Sciences from 2003 to 2008.

== Early life and education ==
Parekh was born in the village of Amalsad in the present-day province of Gujarat, India; his father was a goldsmith with a basic education. Parekh was admitted to the University of Bombay at the age of 15, and earned a bachelor's degree there in 1954 and a Master's in 1956. He began his graduate studies at the London School of Economics in 1959, and received his PhD in 1966.

== Career ==
He taught at the London School of Economics and at the University of Glasgow before finding a long-term position at the University of Hull. Between 1981 and 1984 he was Vice-Chancellor at the Maharaja Sayajirao University of Baroda in India. He also held the Centennial Professorship in the Centre for the Study of Global Governance at the London School of Economics and a professorship of political philosophy at the University of Westminster. In 2002, he served as president of the Academy of Learned Societies in the Social Sciences.

Parekh has also served on the Commission for Racial Equality (including a spell as vice-chairman) and has held membership of a number of bodies concerned with issues of racial equality and multiculturalism – most notably as Chairman of the Commission on the Future of Multi-Ethnic Britain from 1998 to 2000. The report of this body (often referred to as the "Parekh Report") has been the basis for much of the debate on multiculturalism in the UK in the early 21st century.

=== House of Lords ===
He was appointed a life peer on 10 May 2000 as Baron Parekh, of Kingston upon Hull in the East Riding of Yorkshire.

Parekh sits in the Lords as a Labour Party peer. From July 2001 to December 2003, he was a member of the Joint Committee on Human Rights.

=== Publications ===
- Bentham's Political Thought. Croom Helm. 1973. ISBN 0-85664-037-9.
- Marx's Theory of Ideology. Johns Hopkins Univ Pr. 1982. p. 256. ISBN 0-8018-2771-X.
- Colonialism, Tradition and Reform: An Analysis of Gandhi's Political Discourse. Sage. 1989. ISBN 0-8039-9605-5.
- Gandhi's Political Philosophy. A critical examination. Macmillan. 1989. p. 246. ISBN 0-333-54765-9.
- The Future of Multi-Ethnic Britain: Report of the Commission on the Future of Multi-Ethnic Britain. Profile Books. 2000. ISBN 1-86197-227-X.
- Gandhi: A Very Short Introduction. Oxford Paperbacks. 2001. ISBN 978-0-19-285457-5.
- Rethinking Multiculturalism: Cultural Diversity and Political Theory. Harvard UP. 2002. ISBN 0-674-00995-9.
- European Liberalism and 'the Muslim Question': Does Intercultural Dialogue Make Sense? (ISIM Papers). Amsterdam University Press. 2008. ISBN 9789053560877.
- A New Politics of Identity: Political Principles for an Interdependent World. Palgrave Macmillan. 2008. ISBN 978-1-4039-0647-2.
- He also wrote an account of "The Rushdie Affair and the British Press; Some Salutary Lessons" for the Commission for Racial Equality in 1990.
- Colour, Culture and Consciousness: Immigrant Intellectuals in Britain, Allen & Unwin, 1974, ISBN 0-04-301067-9

=== Awards and honours ===
Parekh was elected a Fellow of the Royal Society of Arts (FRSA) in 1988, and a Fellow of the Academy of Learned Societies in the Social Sciences (FAcSS) in 1999. In 2003, he was elected a Fellow of the British Academy (FBA), the United Kingdom's national academy for the humanities and social sciences.

He was awarded an honorary doctorate by the University of Essex in 2003. In 2008, he was awarded an Honorary DUniv From The University of Hull. On 11 July 2011, Parekh was awarded an honorary degree of Doctor of Social Sciences (DSoc Sci) from Nottingham Trent University. On 20 July 2011, Parekh was awarded an Honorary Doctorate of Philosophy from Edge Hill University. He was awarded an honorary Doctor of Laws by the University of Bristol in July 2022.

He was awarded the Padma Bhushan by the Government of India in 2007.

== Personal life ==
Parekh has three sons, including Anant Parekh, they were all awarded scholarships to study at the University of Oxford.

Orders of precedence in the United Kingdom
Preceded by The Lord Mitchell	Gentlemen; Baron Parekh	Followed by The Lord Coe
