= Mark Goldsmith (rabbi) =

British Reform rabbi (born 1963)

Mark Goldsmith (born July 1963) is a British rabbi in the Movement for Reform Judaism. He is Senior Rabbi at Edgware & Hendon Reform Synagogue, a post he took up in 2019. He was previously a rabbi at North Western Reform Synagogue and a vocational programme tutor at Leo Baeck College in London.

Goldsmith was born in July 1963. He trained for the rabbinate at Leo Baeck College and was ordained in 1996. He chaired the Assembly of Reform Rabbis UK from 2011 to 2013, and until 2006 was rabbi at Finchley Progressive Synagogue. He has a particular interest in Jewish business ethics.

Goldsmith is married, with two daughters.
