= Marx's Theory of Ideology =

1982 book by Bhikhu Parekh

- Cover of the first edition
- Author: Bhikhu Parekh
- Language: English
- Subject: Karl Marx
- Publisher: Johns Hopkins University Press
- Publication date: 1982
- Media type: Print (Hardcover and Paperback)
- Pages: 256
- ISBN: 978-0801827716

Marx's Theory of Ideology is a 1982 book about Karl Marx by the political theorist Bhikhu Parekh.

== Reception ==
Marx's Theory of Ideology was reviewed by Nicholas Abercrombih in Sociology and by the political theorist Terrell Carver.
