= Alan Senitt =

British political activist (1978–2006)

Alan Senitt (26 December 1978, Pinner, England – 9 July 2006, Georgetown, Washington, United States) was a British political activist from Pinner, North London. He had previously attended Nower Hill High School, and was a former chairman of the Union of Jewish Students. He stood as the Labour Party candidate in Edgware, North London, in the May 2006 local elections.

He worked with Lord Greville Janner, a member of the House of Lords and vice-president of the World Jewish Congress in 2005, as director of the Coexistence Trust charity. He also worked for the All-Party British-Israel Parliamentary Group and the British Israel Communications and Research Centre. He graduated with an MA in International Studies and Diplomacy from the School of Oriental and African Studies, University of London, and moved to the United States in June 2006 to volunteer for Mark Warner's political action committee Forward Together.

Senitt was murdered in the Georgetown area of Washington, D.C. early on 9 July 2006. Senitt, 27, was escorting a female friend home when they were confronted by three men; at least one had a gun, and one had a knife. One attempted to sexually assault the woman while the other two assailants grabbed Senitt, stabbed him and slashed his throat. Then they fled, riding away in a car driven by a woman. Four suspects were arrested the same day. Christopher Piper, 25, was charged with felony murder and attempted sexual assault. Jeffrey Rice, 22; Olivia Miles, 26, and a 15-year-old boy whom police declined to identify because he has been charged as a juvenile, were all arrested for murder charges. The juvenile later pleaded guilty to murder, as well as other charges, and sentenced to confinement until the age of 21.

On 21 May 2007, Piper and Rice pleaded guilty to robbing and killing Senitt, and committing other robberies in the city. They were sentenced 24 August to 37 and 52 years respectively in prison by the D.C. Superior Court. Olivia Miles received a much shorter sentence for robbery and was released from prison on December 3, 2014.
