= George Carman =

English barrister (1929–2001)

George Carman QC
- Born: George Alfred Carman; 6 October 1929; Blackpool, Lancashire, England
- Died: 2 January 2001 (aged 71); London, England
- Other names: "Gorgeous George" "Killer Carman"
- Education: Balliol College; University of Oxford
- Occupation: Barrister
- Spouse(s): Ursula Groves (1955–1960); Cecilia Sparrow (1960–1976); Frances Venning (1976–1984)
- Children: Dominic Carman

George Alfred Carman, QC (6 October 1929 – 2 January 2001) was an English leading barrister during the 1980s and 1990s. In 1979, he successfully defended the former Liberal leader Jeremy Thorpe after he was charged with conspiracy to murder. Carman had been appointed as a Queen's Counsel (QC) eight years previously. He later appeared in a series of widely publicised criminal cases and libel cases.

== Early life ==
Carman was born in Blackpool, the son of Alfred George Carman and Evelyn (née Moylan) Carman. His father, a former soldier and auctioneer, briefly owned a furniture business, and his mother, the family's main breadwinner, owned a dress shop.

His parents met in Ireland; his mother was the daughter of a Waterford cattle dealer, Michael Moylan. Irish hurling player Christy Moylan was an uncle. George attended St Joseph's College in Blackpool, run by Christian Brothers from Ireland, and a Roman Catholic seminary, St Joseph's College, Upholland, where he trained to be a priest.

Despite being 5 feet 3 inches tall, Carman fulfilled his National Service duty in the British Army. In 1949, he went on to read law at Balliol College, Oxford. While at Oxford, he first met his future client Jeremy Thorpe, when Thorpe (then President of the Oxford Union) invited Carman to be a main speaker in a debate. Carman graduated in 1952 with a first-class honours degree in jurisprudence.

== Early career ==
Carman was called to the bar at Lincoln's Inn in 1953, after passing his bar finals in May of that year with a third class degree. He was a pupil barrister at the chambers of Neil Lawson at 1 Harcourt Buildings and then practised as a barrister on the Northern Circuit in Manchester, based at the chambers of Godfrey Heilper QC at 60 King Street, later 47 Peter Street, doing mostly criminal and personal injury work.

Carman was appointed Queen's Counsel in 1971, and moved to Byrom Street Chambers, with a London seat at 5 Essex Court in the Temple. A year later, he was appointed as a recorder, a part-time judicial role. He resigned as a recorder in 1984.

Carman defended the manager of Battersea Fun Fair in 1973, when the manager was accused of manslaughter after the big dipper ride malfunctioned in May 1972, resulting in the deaths of five children. This case brought him to the attention of the London solicitor David Napley, who instructed him to represent Jeremy Thorpe, the former Leader of the Liberal Party. In 1979, after successfully defending Thorpe, who was charged with three other men with conspiracy to murder Norman Scott in a case which became the cause célèbre of the decade, he became involved in several significant criminal trials during the 1980s. He practised exclusively from London chambers after June 1980.

== Criminal cases ==
In 1981, Carman defended Leonard Arthur, a consultant paediatrician, which he would later see as his proudest moment. He later said of Arthur, who had been accused of murdering a Down's syndrome baby: "He was a very dedicated doctor and clearly a kind and moral man who had done much good for thousands of mothers in this country – hundreds of whom wrote to him and sent flowers during the trial. His acquittal by the jury, very quickly, is the moment in my career which has given me the greatest pleasure". In 1981, Carman accepted an appointment to the High Court in Hong Kong, but later declined it, preferring to argue cases in court.

In 1982, Carman unsuccessfully defended Geoffrey Prime, a British spy who sold and disclosed information to the Soviet Union and also indecently assaulted young girls. Prime was sentenced to 38 years in prison. In 1983, he represented the family of banker Roberto Calvi, whose body—weighted down with bricks and stones—had been found hanging under London's Blackfriars Bridge in June 1982. Carman asserted that Calvi was murdered, and convinced the High Court to reverse the original verdict of suicide and order a new inquest. Also in 1983, he successfully defended Coronation Street actor Peter Adamson, who was acquitted of indecently assaulting two eight-year-old girls in a public swimming pool in Haslingden. Adamson later admitted his guilt.

In 1989, Carman successfully defended comedian Ken Dodd on charges of tax evasion, saying, "Some accountants are comedians, but comedians are never accountants." He also successfully represented Carole Richardson, one of the Guildford Four, falsely accused of a 1974 deadly pub bombing carried out by the Provisional IRA — when their convictions were quashed on appeal in 1989. In 1991, solicitor David Napley retained Carman to advise and defend Greville Janner, later Lord Janner, during investigations into allegations of child sexual abuse; according to Dominic Carman, the barrister's son, both Napley and Carman were astonished when Janner was not charged.

== Libel cases ==
During the 1990s, Carman appeared in many prominent libel trials on behalf of British newspapers, including the successful defence of The Guardian against a libel case brought by the Conservative politician, Jonathan Aitken. He became known for his celebrity clients, attracting headlines for his robust cross-examination, colourful one-liners in court and for winning difficult cases against seemingly insurmountable odds. When called back to Manchester in 1991 to save the Haçienda nightclub from the threat of police closure, Carman soon found the problem: the proclamations of owner Tony Wilson. It was reported that his opening advice was "Gentlemen, shut that loudmouth up!"

Carman's reputation was built through representing The News of the World against Sonia Sutcliffe, The Sun against Gillian Taylforth, Elton John against Mirror Group Newspapers, Richard Branson in the "dirty tricks" cases against British Airways and GTech, Imran Khan against fellow former cricketers, Ian Botham and Allan Lamb, Tom Cruise and Nicole Kidman against Express Newspapers, and Mohamed Al-Fayed against Neil Hamilton, as well as his representation of Channel 4 when they were sued for libel by South African journalist Jani Allan.

Carman was head of chambers of New Court, Temple for 20 years before the chambers dissolved under him in January 2000. He then joined 4–5 Gray's Inn Square, replacing Cherie Booth, the wife of then-Prime Minister Tony Blair. Seven months later, on 29 August 2000, Carman announced his retirement.

== Personal life ==
Carman was married and divorced three times. He married Ursula Groves in 1955; they separated in 1958 and were divorced in 1960. He then married Cecilia Sparrow in July 1960, with whom he had one son, the writer Dominic Carman. They separated in 1973 and divorced in 1976. He married Frances Venning in March 1976; they separated in 1983 and divorced in 1984. In later life, his companion was a barrister, Karen Phillips. He appeared as a guest on the BBC's Desert Island Discs in June 1990.

His son Dominic wrote a biography of his father, No Ordinary Man: A Life of George Carman, in 2002 and stood as a Liberal Democrat candidate in Barking for the 2010 General election and at the 2011 Barnsley Central by-election. In his biography, Dominic recorded that his father was emotionally abusive to him, emotionally and physically abusive to his wives and described him as a bisexual binge-drinker. The 2022 documentary Jimmy Savile: A British Horror Story interviewed both Dominic Carman and newspaper editor Paul Connew; in the documentary, both Dominic and Connew indicated that George was aware of Savile's proclivity for underage sex. In an article in The Guardian in 2012, Dominic stated that his father was well aware that Savile had committed sexual offences against children.

== Death ==
Carman suffered with prostate cancer for several years, and died on 2 January 2001, in Merton in southwest London.

According to an obituary published in The Lawyer on 9 January 2001, Carman "...was thought of by many as one of the most difficult men in the legal profession, with a somewhat brash and even obnoxious persona."

Carman's funeral was held at Westminster Cathedral with a memorial service at St Clement Danes.

== Media portrayals ==
In April 2002, the BBC broadcast the biographical drama Get Carman: The Trials of George Carman QC starring David Suchet as Carman, Lisa Maxwell as Gillian Taylforth, Douglas Reith as Jonathan Aitken and Sarah Berger as Jani Allan. The title refers to Guardian editor Alan Rusbridger's response to the news of Aitken's 1995 libel action against the paper: "We'd better get Carman—before Aitken gets him."

In 2018, Carman was portrayed by Adrian Scarborough in the BBC drama A Very English Scandal about the Thorpe affair.

== Sources ==
- Michael Beloff, "Carman, George Alfred (1929–2001)", Oxford Dictionary of National Biography, Oxford University Press, Jan 2005; online edn, Jan 2011; accessed 3 June 2014.(subscription required)
