= The Coexistence Trust =

Interfaith organization based in the United Kingdom

- Formation: 2005
- Founder: Greville Janner, Prince Hassan bin Talal
- Formerly called: The Political Council for Coexistence

The Coexistence Trust is an organisation founded in 2005 by Lord Janner of Braunstone and Prince Hassan of Jordan. The body was originally named The Political Council for Coexistence.

== Purpose and mission ==
A network of senior Muslim and Jewish political leaders worldwide with its headquarters in London, UK, the trust provides a bridge across the political spectrum to combat Islamophobia and Anti-Semitism wherever it may be found in the world. The trust uses its level of access to intervene at the highest levels of government whenever and wherever there are racist attacks against Muslims or Jews.

The trust believes that with political authority comes the responsibility to be sensitive to the role of religion in public life. Therefore, the trust regularly arranges private meetings between leaders from the spheres of religion and politics to discuss contemporary issues. In addition to its membership, The trust has a distinguished group of patrons. These are among others, eminent personalities from the Abrahamic faiths.

The Coexistence Trust's mission is to strengthen mutual understanding between Jewish and Muslim communities worldwide and to provide an enlightened centrist platform for Muslim and Jewish political leaders to combat Islamophobia and Anti-Semitism at senior levels. It envisions a world in which the dialogue between Muslim and Jewish leaders is collaborative, open, respectful and focused on the benefit of society as a whole.

== Patrons, trustees and members ==
=== Presidents ===
- Prince Hassan bin Talal

=== Chairperson ===
- 2005–2008: Baron Janner of Braunstone
- 2008–2013: Baron Mitchell

=== Directors ===
- Alan Senitt
- Samuel Klein

=== Deceased ===
- Baron Janner of Braunstone (former president)

== Activities ==
=== Autumn 2008 Roadshow ===
- coexistence-trust-starts-work-lse
- article5073757.ece
