= Rethinking Multiculturalism =

Rethinking Multiculturalism: Cultural Diversity and Political Theory
- Author: Bhikhu Parekh
- Language: English
- Genre: Politics
- Publisher: Harvard University Press (October 30, 2002)
- ISBN: 0674009959

Rethinking Multiculturalism: Cultural Diversity and Political Theory is a 2002 non-fiction book by the British political theorist Bhikhu Parekh and published by Harvard University Press. It creates and defines multiculturalism in the form of political theory as well as political practice in the modern era, being based on Parekh's experience of Multiculturalism in British society as well as other areas around the world. Parekh's book addresses several topics, primarily multicultural politics, as well as the practice and theory behind addressing these politics.

== Author ==
Bhikhu Parekh is a political theorist who received his PHD at the London School of economics. He has taught at University of Glasgow, University of Hull, as well as the University of Westminster. Parekh has hands on experience with multiculturalism, as he participated in several issues of multiculturalism in the UK, with a notable position as chairman on the Commission on the Future of Multi-Ethnic Britain. A large amount of debate in the UK on multiculturalism stems from Parekh's work in the early 2000s on while he was chairman. Charles Taylor addresses that Parekh's experiences gives him a stronger sense of possible situations and problems in a modern atmosphere.

== Synopsis ==
Culture is the belief or view human beings create regarding the significance of human life, and in close proximity different views and sets of beliefs are created. In the text, Parekh approaches cultural diversity as a value, not a fact in Britain's diverse environment. Parekh writes about the dangers of avoiding ignoring diversity as well as if diversity is over addressed. analysis of culture, Montesquieu, Vico, and Herder. In this analysis, other theorists approach culture in a sense that is too contained, as Parekh believes culture changes on a larger scale. It is believed Parekh is influenced by Charles Taylor's essay on multiculturalism. Much like Taylor, Parekh focuses avoiding ignoring several aspects of multicultural values including but not limited to education, separation and gender values. Parekh criticizes theorists who over invest in a eurocentric view, and success relies on an equal distribution of political and economic power rather than a minority and majority. Parekh explores liberalism as a paradox unique to western political philosophy. The existence of only one way to live a good life leads to segregation of individuals in a multicultural society. Individuals who carry their own culture disturb relationships of power that in return culture has previously been established In. In later chapters Parekh also addresses separation of church and state will never entirely justify the separation of religion and politics, as religion represents so many citizens of most countries and in the world as a whole.

== Reception ==
Rethinking Multiculturalism: Cultural Diversity and Political Theory has been reviewed by several political and cultural authors. While some criticism was addressed, the overall reception of Parekh's work's is positive as he attempted to remain unbiased and neutral when writing about multiculturalism. Dortha Kolodziejczyk overall acclaims it to be insightful for addressing typically unthought of issues, accrediting it to Parekh's way of thoroughly addressing both sides of the issues.

== Criticism ==
Parekh's text was criticized from other cultural authors based on his opinions in the book. Many accused the text of having no real world use, and only theory to back it up. The text has few supported conclusions supported by real life scenarios. Other disagreement stems from Parekh's inability to address concepts of democracy, liberalism, citizenship and nation being from anywhere other than western politics. One cultural author Dortha Kolodziejczyk commented on Parekh's obsession of maintaining a non western approach to liberalism and culture while cementing liberalism as western. Kolodziejcyk says that many of Parekh's ideas do attempt to bring new ideas and perspectives, but not all of them in practice will work the way he intends.
