= Bromley Reform Synagogue =

Reform synagogue in Bromley, London, England

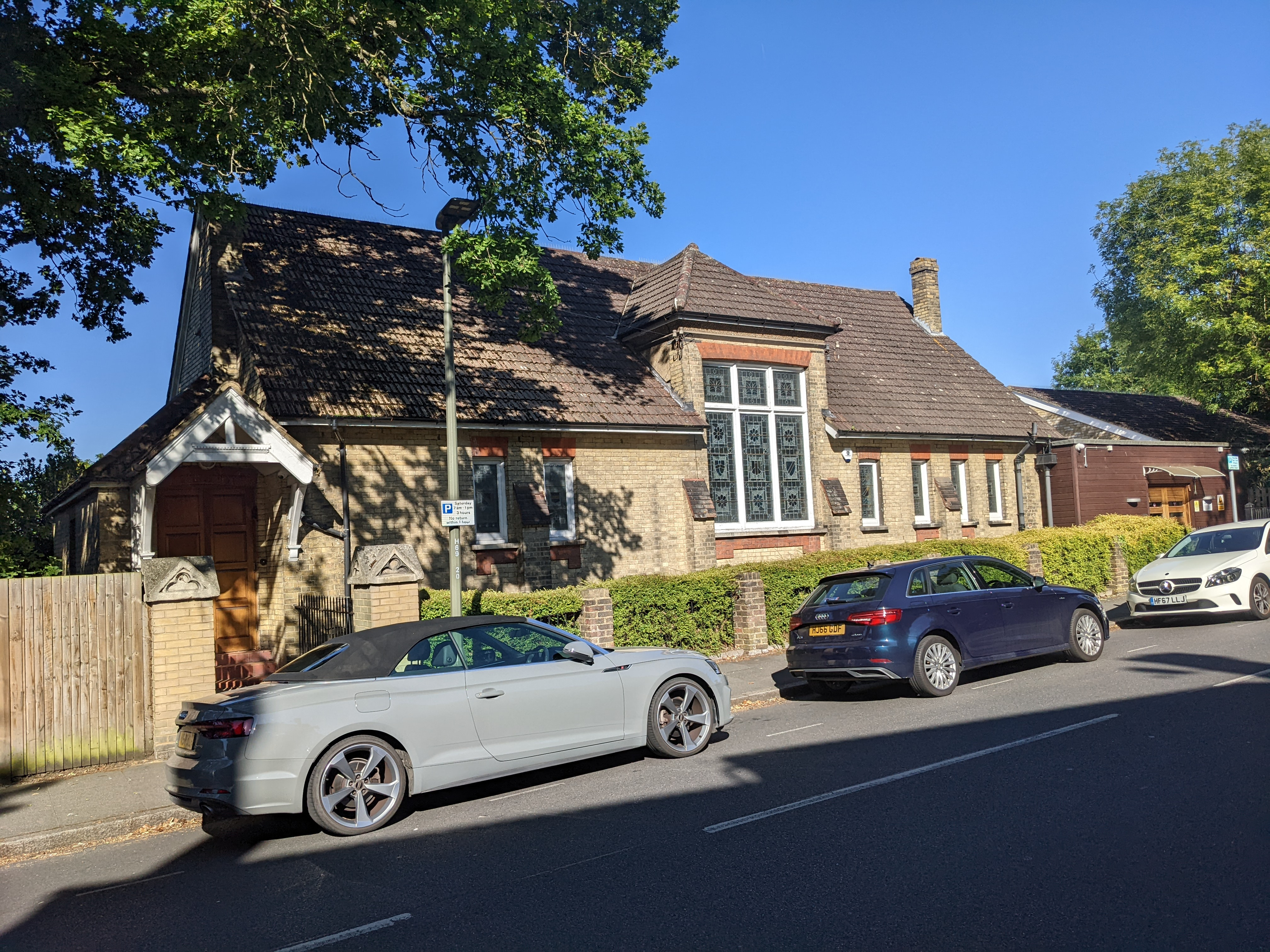
- The synagogue in 2022

- Location of the synagogue in London

Religion
- Affiliation: Reform Judaism
- Ecclesiastical or organisational status: Synagogue
- Leadership: Rabbi Laura Janner-Klausner
- Status: Active

Location
- Location: 28 Highland Road, Shortlands, Bromley, London
- Country: England, United Kingdom
- Coordinates: 51°24′30″N 0°00′23″E

Architecture
- Established: 1964 (as a congregation)
- Completed: 1967

Website
- bromleyshul.org.uk

Bromley Reform Synagogue is a Reform Jewish congregation and synagogue, at 28 Highland Road, in Shortlands, Bromley, in the Borough of Bromley, London, England.

The congregation was established in 1964 and moved to Highland Road in 1967. The sanctuary has been refurbished in light wood and glass to reflect the Hebrew name of the community, Beit Or, House of Light. Bromley Reform Synagogue is a member of the Movement for Reform Judaism.

Laura Janner-Klausner became the rabbi in 2022.

== Communications ==
The Bromley Reform Synagogue's website was recognised in the 2009 Board of Deputies Media Awards, when it won the prize for best synagogue website. The community has a weekly e-newsletter e-Light as well as a monthly printed newsletter, Highlight, itself an award-winning publication.

== See also ==
- History of the Jews in England
- List of Jewish communities in the United Kingdom
- List of synagogues in the United Kingdom
