= Parry Mitchell, Baron Mitchell =

British businessman (born 1943)

The Right Honourable The Lord Mitchell
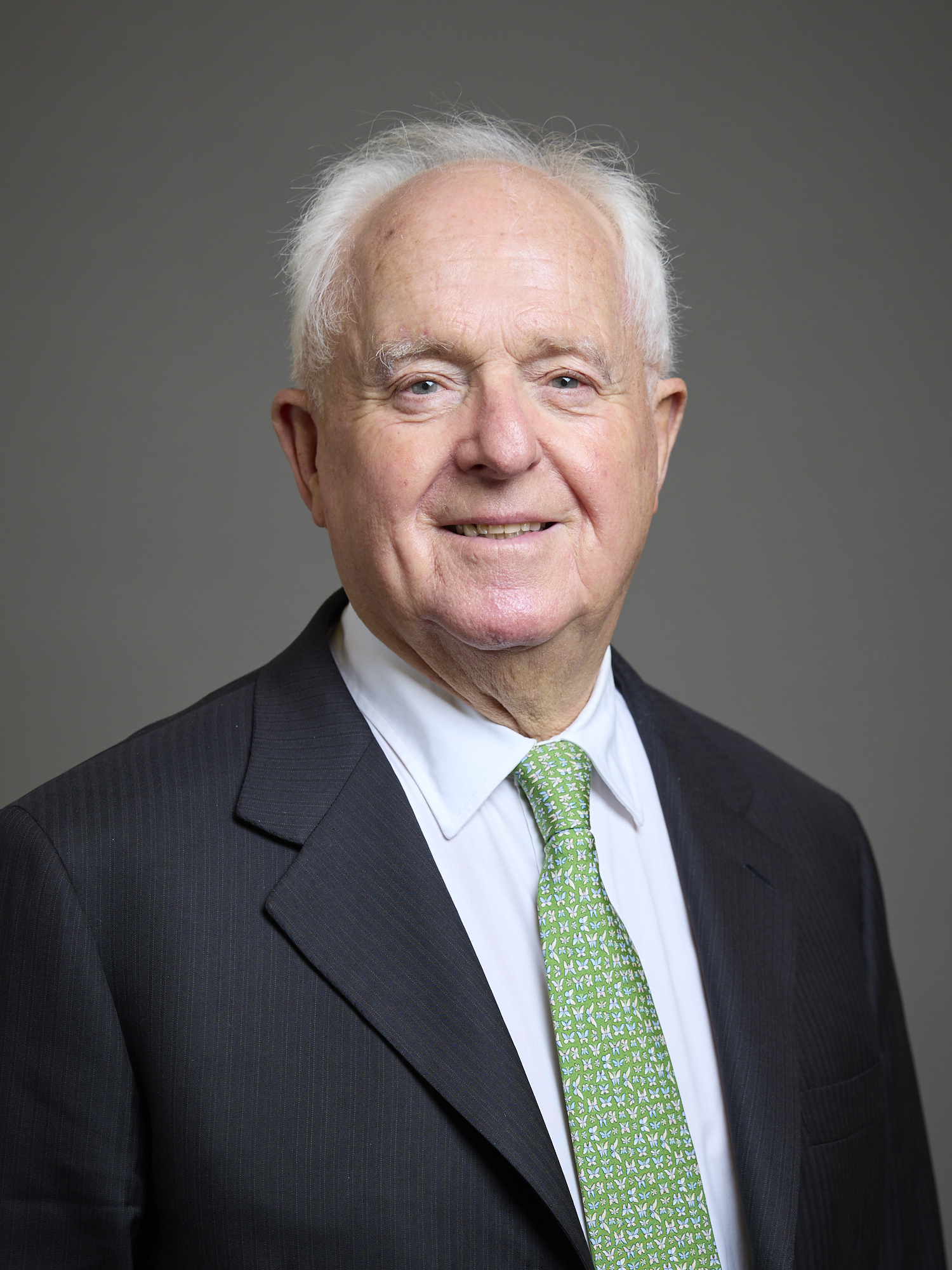
- Official portrait, 2024

Member of the House of Lords
- Lord Temporal
- Life peerage 10 May 2000

Personal details
- Born: Parry Andrew Mitchell; 6 May 1943 (age 83)
- Party: Social Democrat; Labour
- Spouse: Hannah Lowy
- Education: University of London (BSc(Econ)); Columbia Business School (MBA)

Parry Andrew Mitchell, Baron Mitchell (born 6 May 1943) is a British businessman and Labour member of the House of Lords. On 10 May 2000, Mitchell was created a life peer as Baron Mitchell, of Hampstead in the London Borough of Camden, and introduced in the House of Lords on 24 May 2000. He sat on the Labour benches until he resigned from the party in September 2016. He rejoined the party in June 2020.

== Education ==
Parry Mitchell holds a B.Sc. (Econ) from the University of London and an MBA from Columbia Business School, New York.

== Business career ==
Mitchell founded, grew and subsequently sold, three international companies in the IT services sector: Standard Chartered Leasing Ltd; United Leasing plc and Syscap plc.

Today his interest is in start-up companies. He is a director of an iPad App start up in Manhattan, called Zuse - a multitasking browser, and he is also chairman of Instant Impact, based in London.

Mitchell formed and chaired the eLearning Foundation (which provides laptops for disadvantaged children); He founded an initiative called Making Connections which enables Israeli and British academics to collaborate on scientific research projects; He chaired the Coexistence Trust whose mission it was to encourage dialogue between Muslim and Jewish students on UK campuses.

== Political career ==
Mitchell was a founder of the Social Democrats in 1981 and twice stood unsuccessfully for Parliament for the party in general elections, at Ealing Acton in the 1983 general election and then at Salisbury in 1987.

Mitchell was ennobled in 2000 and took the Labour whip. He served on the Science and Technology Select Committee. In 2012 he was appointed Shadow Business Minister but resigned in 2013. In July 2013 he was appointed as Labour's Enterprise Adviser. In October 2017 he joined the Cross Benches of the House of Lords.

In a letter to The Guardian in 2016, he criticised the award of a peerage to Shami Chakrabarti soon after "her anaemic report on antisemitism" in the party "smacks of a reward for preparing the report that the leadership wanted". He pointed to his five-year chairmanship of The Coexistence Trust, which aims to build bridges between Jewish and Muslim students "to deal with the twin evils of antisemitism and Islamophobia on UK campuses", but commented that it was becoming acceptable for Labour affiliated students to use antisemitic epithets without the party doing anything about it. On 24 September 2016, Mitchell resigned from the Labour Party following the re-election of Jeremy Corbyn as party leader. He had previously said he would leave Labour if Corbyn was re-elected and, after the result was announced, said: "I’m a man of my word". According to Lord Mitchell on the BBC's Sunday Politics programme, Corbyn "surrounds himself with a coterie of people who hold violent, violent anti-Israel views and allied with it they are very hostile to Jews so, in my view, they’re pretty bad guys".

== Personal life ==
He is married to Hannah Lowy, a documentary film-maker by profession, who is a Trustee of The Donmar Warehouse Theatre in London and was a board member of Women for Women International for seven years, and later an Emeritus Trustee. Lady Mitchell chairs the family trust (The Lowy Mitchell Foundation) which supports a number of educational charities. They have twin sons.

Orders of precedence in the United Kingdom
Preceded by The Lord Turnberg	Gentlemen; Baron Mitchell	Followed by The Lord Parekh
