= Greville Janner =

British politician and barrister (1928–2015)

The Right Honourable The Lord Janner of Braunstone QC
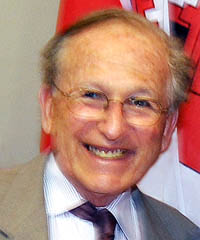
- Janner in 2009

Member of the House of Lords
- Lord Temporal
- Life peerage 25 October 1997 – 19 December 2015

Member of Parliament for Leicester West Leicester North West (1970–1974)
- In office 18 June 1970 – 8 April 1997
- Preceded by: Barnett Janner
- Succeeded by: Patricia Hewitt

Personal details
- Born: Greville Ewan Janner; 11 July 1928 Cardiff, Wales
- Died: 19 December 2015 (aged 87) London, England
- Resting place: Willesden Jewish Cemetery
- Party: Labour (suspended April 2015)
- Spouse: Myra Sheink (m. 1955; died 1996)
- Children: 3, including Daniel and Laura
- Parent: Barnett Janner
- Education: St Paul's School, London
- Alma mater: Trinity Hall, Cambridge; Harvard Law School
- Profession: Barrister

Greville Ewan Janner, Baron Janner of Braunstone, QC (11 July 1928 – 19 December 2015) was a British politician, barrister and writer. He became a Labour Party Member of Parliament for Leicester in the 1970 general election as a last-minute candidate, succeeding his father. He was an MP until 1997, and then elevated to the House of Lords. Never a frontbencher, Janner was particularly known for his work on Select Committees; he chaired the Select Committee on Employment for a time. He was associated with a number of Jewish organisations including the Board of Deputies of British Jews, of which he was chairman from 1978 to 1984, and was later prominent in the field of education about the Holocaust.

Beginning in 1991, several allegations of child sexual abuse were made against Janner. Criminal proceedings brought in 2015 were halted by his death in December of that year; claims made against his estate were all dropped by May 2017, with Janner's family calling the claimants "false accusers" afraid of cross-examination. Carl Beech, whose accusations had led to the Operation Midland police investigation (and who was himself found to be a child sex offender), was convicted for false accusation of Janner and others and jailed for 18 years; the Janner family subsequently criticised both the Labour politician Tom Watson for his part in the affair, and the system "where people are believed instantly before the evidence is examined". An enquiry into the handling of the case by officials began in October 2020. In October 2021, the enquiry concluded that the police "appeared reluctant to fully investigate" the allegations against Janner, and that the process had been marred by a "series of failings".

== Early life ==
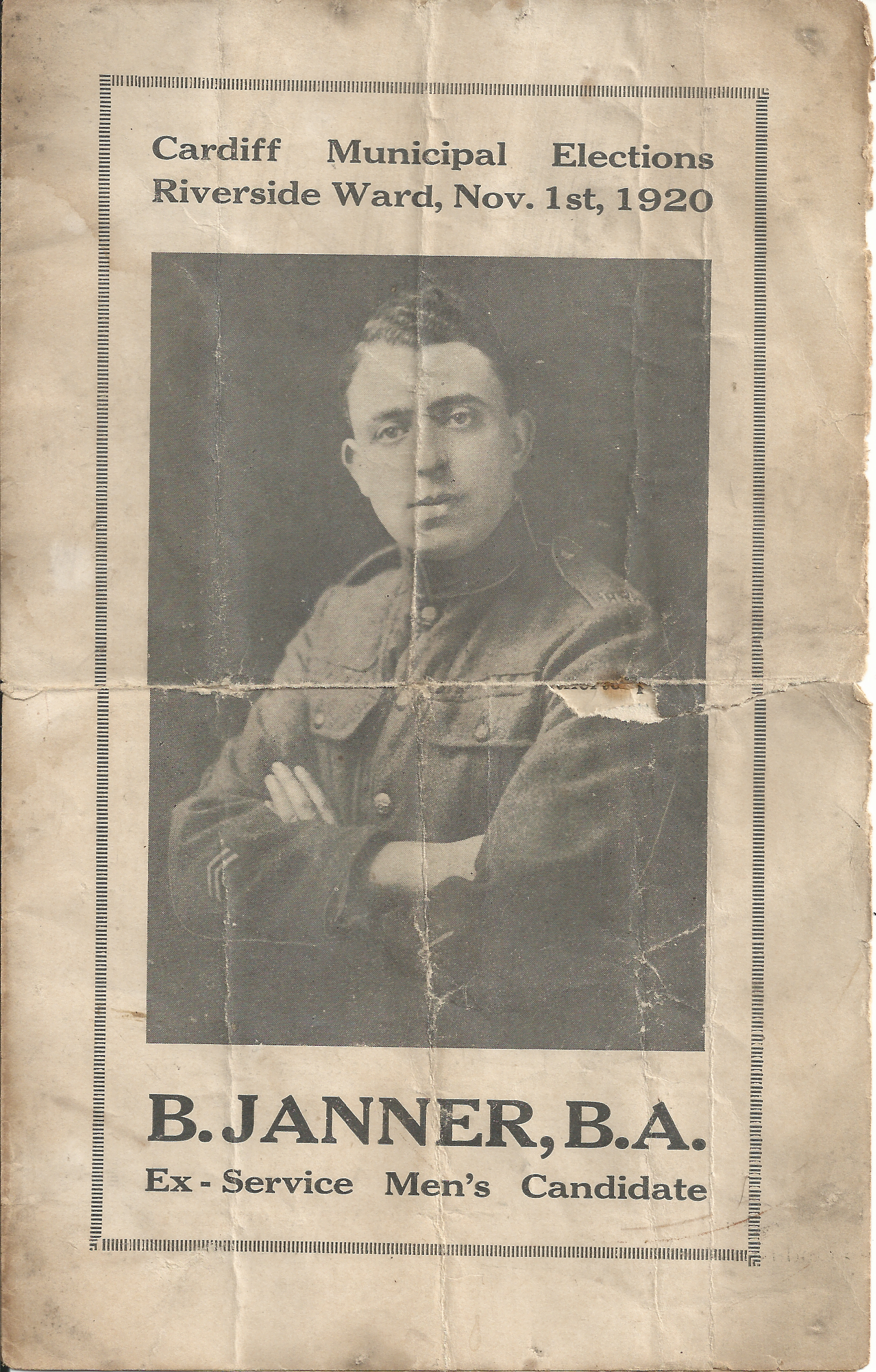
Janner's father Barnett Janner, a Liberal and then Labour MP

Janner was born in Cardiff, Wales, to Lithuanian Jewish (Litvak) parents, the son of Barnett Janner and Elsie Sybil, née Cohen. Janner and Ruth, his sister (later Lady Morris of Kenwood), were evacuated to Canada at the age of 11, because their parents anticipated a Nazi invasion of Britain. While in Canada, living with family friends, he attended Bishop's College School, Lennoxville, Quebec. Janner returned to Britain in 1942 and attended St Paul's School, London.

At the age of 18, he served in occupied Germany working for the War Crimes Investigation Unit of the British Army of the Rhine for 18 months. Janner investigated cases of British airmen who were shot at Stalag Luft III, the prisoner of war camp. At weekends, he worked with Holocaust survivors at Bergen-Belsen. The army unit was closed in 1948 to Janner's dismay.

Later, Janner read law at Trinity Hall, Cambridge, where he was President of the Cambridge Union Society, in 1952, and chairman of the university Labour Club. He became the international secretary of the National Association of Labour Students and president of Trinity Hall Athletic Club. Janner was able to attend Harvard Law School through both the Fulbright and Smith-Mundt Act awards.

After training, via a Harmsworth Scholarship at Middle Temple, he became a barrister in 1954 and was appointed a Queen's Counsel (QC) in 1971.

== Public career ==
=== House of Commons and Jewish causes ===
Having unsuccessfully fought Wimbledon in the 1955 General Election, Janner represented Leicester North West from the 1970 general election until February 1974, succeeding his father, Sir Barnett Janner, a former Chairman of the Zionist Federation of Great Britain. His father announced his retirement from the Commons two days before candidate nominations closed in 1970, and his son was quickly chosen in his place. Posters imploring electors to "Vote Janner" had already been printed, and thus did not need to be scrapped.

The younger Janner retained the reformed Leicester West from 1974 until his retirement at the 1997 general election. Janner chaired the Select Committee on Employment from 1994 to 1996. He lost this position because Conservative members of the committee acted against him. A potential conflict of interest existed as he was an advisor to firms the committee might investigate. He was succeeded in Leicester West by Patricia Hewitt.

Janner was president of the Board of Deputies of British Jews, the main representative body of the British Jewish community, from 1978 to 1984, and was a prominent campaigner in the efforts to gain reparations for victims of the Holocaust. In parliament, and outside, he was involved in campaigning for the War Crimes Act 1991, lobbying the Thatcher government to allow legislation to bring those responsible for Nazi atrocities (and then living in Britain) to justice. He was also a vice-president of the World Jewish Congress until 2009 and of the Jewish Leadership Council until 2015. He was president of the National Council for Soviet Jewry (1979–85) and the Commonwealth Jewish Council.

In 1988 he co-founded the Holocaust Educational Trust with Merlyn Rees, a body which successfully persuaded the British government to add teaching about the Holocaust to the National Curriculum in 1988. Janner stood down from the role in 2012. The Lord Janner Scholarship provides funding for ten schools to take part in the Trust's educational programmes each year.

Janner sought to foster good relations between different faiths and religions and wrote about this issue in his book One Hand Alone Cannot Clap. He co-founded (along with Prince Hassan of Jordan) the Coexistence Trust, a charity to combat Islamophobia and antisemitism.

=== House of Lords ===
Janner was created a life peer as Baron Janner of Braunstone, of Leicester in the County of Leicestershire in 1997. He was President and an Officer of the All-Party Parliamentary Group against Anti-Semitism. Janner was associated with the Labour Friends of Israel and in 2002 backed Stephen Byers to be chairman.

In 2006, Janner was struck by Lord Bramall, a former head of the Armed Forces, during a heated row over the Middle East. In the incident, which occurred during the 2006 Lebanon War, the two men had disagreed in the House of Lords chamber after Bramall had made comments Janner considered too critical of Israel. Janner was hit in one of the rooms close to the chamber. Janner later sought the advice of fellow peers about how and whether to make a formal complaint against Lord Bramall, before deciding to accept an apology.

Janner continued to attend the House of Lords until December 2013. He was on leave of absence from the House of Lords from 13 October 2014.

=== Other ===
Janner wrote a number of books on public speaking and business communication, including On Presentation. In addition, he wrote extensively under the pen-name Ewan Mitchell. He was a former member of The Magic Circle and the International Brotherhood of Magicians.

== Personal life ==
In 1955, Janner married Myra Louise Sheink, who was originally from Australia and the niece of Sir Israel Brodie, the former Chief Rabbi of Great Britain and the Commonwealth. The couple had three children: two daughters and a son. Myra Sheink died in 1996.

Lord Janner's younger daughter is Rabbi Laura Janner-Klausner, who was appointed Senior Rabbi to Reform Judaism in 2011. She is married to a brother of the Israeli writer Amos Oz. Marion Janner, his other daughter, was appointed Officer of the Order of the British Empire (OBE) for services to mental health in 2010. Daniel Janner, his son, is a barrister and KC.

=== Illness and death ===
In 2009, Janner was diagnosed with Alzheimer's disease. Its advancing severity meant that by 2015 he required round-the-clock care for his dementia. At a court hearing in August 2015, a medical specialist acting as a witness for the defence said that Janner was experiencing the early stages of Parkinson's disease. Janner died on 19 December 2015 from complications of Alzheimer's disease, aged 87.

== Child sexual abuse allegations ==
Over the years, starting in 1991, specific allegations of sex abuse of children by Janner in the past—dating ultimately from at least 1955—were made to authorities. This did not lead to any official action, beyond Janner being questioned once, from the first allegations until 2015. After it was decided in 2015 that he should have been prosecuted earlier, the accusations were to be investigated in a "trial of the facts" in April 2016—Janner was deemed to be too ill for a criminal trial—but he died before this could happen, though his actions were included in a large inquiry into historical sex abuse.

=== Statements to Parliament in December 1991 ===
In 1991, the director of a children's home in Leicestershire, Frank Beck, was convicted of child abuse over 13 years to 1986 and sentenced to five life terms. During the trial, Beck accused Janner of having abused a child, and a witness said that while he was in care Janner had abused him. Janner could not say that Beck was lying until after the trial, because it would have been in contempt of court.

Janner received cross-party support in the House of Commons after Beck's conviction. In a Commons statement, delivered on 2 December, he said there was "not a shred of truth" in the claims which had been made against him. In a debate on 3 December on the issue of contempt of court and third-parties being potentially defamed in court cases—essentially, according to another MP, dealing with the accusations against "an honoured colleague in the House"—Janner said he had received a letter from a former cellmate of Beck's, who had written that Beck was intent on implicating Janner as being responsible for criminal acts to "take the light off him [Beck]". Janner said that he had previously refused to provide Beck with references, and that Beck had "enlisted" the witness, Paul Winston, in an attempt to "frame" Janner.

=== Early police investigations and CPS decisions ===
Before the publicised 2014 police investigation, there were three earlier investigations, none of which led to a prosecution.

Janner was interviewed by the police in 1991, when the prosecution case against Beck was being prepared. No charges were brought against the MP because of "insufficient evidence", although the Crown Prosecution Service (CPS) said in 2015 that Janner should have been tried. The 1991 interview was the only time Janner was interviewed by the police. Accompanied by his solicitor, Janner has been reported as having replied "no comment" to the questions put to him. Janner and his solicitor, Sir David Napley, were in contact with the barrister George Carman QC in anticipation of a defence brief needing to be prepared if Janner was put on trial. Carman and Napley were surprised no charges were brought against him because of the weight of evidence, according to Dominic Carman, the barrister's son.

Further police investigations took place in 2002 and 2006; documents relating to Janner were not passed to the Crown Prosecution Service after the 2002 investigation. The former Director of Public Prosecutions (DPP), Lord Macdonald, told The Guardian in April 2015 that the penultimate CPS decision not to prosecute Janner in 2007 was actually made by officials in Leicestershire who did not contact head office in London about the case.

In September 2014, The Times reported that Mike Creedon, currently the Chief Constable of Derbyshire Constabulary, claimed that in 1989, while he was serving as a Detective Sergeant, senior police chiefs severely limited his enquiries into paedophilia allegations against Janner, despite "credible evidence" which warranted further investigation.

=== Fourth investigation and original CPS decision ===
In 2013 and early 2014, Leicestershire Police searched Janner's home in north London and his offices in the House of Lords in connection with an enquiry linked to historical child abuse allegations. Janner insisted on his innocence. A file of evidence against Janner was sent to the CPS, but he was not interviewed by the police.

On 16 April 2015, the CPS issued a statement indicating that they would not charge Janner owing to his poor health. During Leicestershire Police's Operation Enamel more than 20 men were interviewed who claimed Janner had abused them before they were adults. The CPS stated that the case met their evidential test for prosecution and they would have otherwise have prosecuted on 22 counts of indecent assaults and buggery, against nine persons which are alleged to have occurred between 1969 and 1988.

They decided that it failed the public interest test, as Janner was diagnosed with Alzheimer's disease in 2009 and the associated dementia had progressed to a point where he could not engage with the court process, and his evidence could not be relied upon. This meant that a court case could not proceed. Four specialist medical practitioners, two acting for the prosecution and police and two for the defence, had confirmed the severity of Janner's dementia. Just over a week later, it emerged that although the four doctors agreed Janner had severe dementia they were not unanimous on the six points listed in the CPS statement. Only one was asked if Janner could be faking the condition, a suggestion which was categorically dismissed. However, witnesses have testified that Janner was not only lucid in 2013 but was also seen driving his car. Alison Saunders, the Director of Public Prosecutions, stated that the earlier decisions made by police and the CPS not to prosecute were wrong. A retired High Court judge, Sir Richard Henriques, was appointed to carry out an independent investigation of all matters involving the CPS which related to the case. Henriques' report was published in January 2016 (see below).

Saunders told the London Evening Standard a week later: "My job is not to be populist. It's not to make decisions on the basis of what people want. It's about making the right decisions." On 16 April 2015, a few hours after the CPS decision, the Labour Party suspended Janner from membership of the party.

"Lord Janner is a man of great integrity and high repute with a long and unblemished record of public service", his family said in a statement issued at the time of the CPS decision in April 2015. "He is entirely innocent of any wrongdoing. As the Crown Prosecution Service indicated today, this decision [not to prosecute] does not mean or imply that any of the allegations that have been made are established or that Lord Janner is guilty of any offence."

=== Initial responses ===
After the announcement, Leicestershire Police, blamed in the CPS statement for past failures in the investigations into Janner's activities, said it was considering a request for a judicial review into the CPS decision. Solicitors representing alleged victims said that actions for damages against the peer were likely.

Lord Macdonald, the former DPP, told the Today programme on BBC Radio 4 on 18 April that a decision over whether to prosecute Janner should have been taken in court by a judge, rather than by the CPS, to remove any doubt that the most recent investigation had been carried out properly. The Exaro website revealed on the same day that Janner was being investigated as part of Operation Midland, the Metropolitan Police's investigation into the Westminster paedophile ring.

It emerged that during April, Janner had written to the House of Lords clerks indicating that he did not wish to cease being an active peer. John Mann, who was then campaigning to retain his Bassetlaw seat for Labour during the 2015 general election, told The Daily Telegraph that all the documents relating to the upper chamber's contact with Janner should be made public. "I don't see how you can sign a document relating to membership of the House of Lords if you have dementia", he said.

A cross-party letter co-ordinated by Simon Danczuk, a Labour politician, signed by 11 politicians from 7 parties, was published in The Times on 22 April. The signatories asserted: "As long as justice is not seen to be done and the greater public interest is not served, the public will see attempts to investigate establishment figures involved in historic child abuse as a whitewash." The legal commentator Joshua Rozenberg, writing for The Guardian, accused the politicians of not understanding the legal system. Critical of other decisions Saunders has made as DPP, he nevertheless agreed with her judgement in the Janner case and said she should "be commended for defending her Janner decision in unprecedented detail".

=== Subsequent developments ===
On 29 April 2015, Dame Lowell Goddard, the New Zealand judge appointed to head the Independent Inquiry into Child Sexual Abuse, announced that she would also investigate the Janner case. Goddard would have access to CPS files and the ability to interview Janner's alleged victims. Goddard was to review the medical evidence concerning Janner's fitness to stand trial, with the possibility that she might commission her own assessment, and question Janner if he had been declared medically fit.

In the new parliament elected on 7 May 2015, 78 MPs supported a reversal of the DPP (Alison Saunders') decision and for the case to go to court in a "trial of the facts". This was the eventual ruling at the Old Bailey in December 2015, but Janner died soon afterwards, several months before the trial of the facts was scheduled to take place.

It emerged on 15 May 2015 that the CPS decision not to charge Lord Janner was being reviewed under the CPS Victims' Right to Review scheme by an external senior QC previously uninvolved in the case.

=== Overturning of the CPS decision ===
On 29 June 2015, it was reported the decision of the Director of Public Prosecutions not to prosecute Janner had been overturned by David Perry, the QC appointed to make a review of the CPS decision in April. A judge was now to decide if Janner was fit to stand a criminal trial. The case was considered at Westminster Magistrates' Court on 7 August; the court ruled that Janner must attend the preliminary hearing, if only briefly. Janner was in court for less than a minute on 14 August to identify himself. The next hearing was at the Old Bailey on 1 September; Janner was not required to appear.

On 7 December 2015, it was ruled at the Old Bailey that Janner was unfit to stand trial. The presiding judge, Mr Justice Openshaw, summarised his decision based on the evidence from four medical experts: "The defendant has advanced and disabling dementia that has deteriorated and is irreversible, and accordingly I find that he is unfit to plead." A trial of the facts was scheduled to take place in April 2016, at which a jury would have heard the evidence and come to a conclusion about Janner's alleged abuse, but would not have been able to decide Janner's innocence or guilt.

=== Posthumous developments ===
Janner died on 19 December 2015, and criminal proceedings against him ended with his death. Old Bailey judge Mr Justice Openshaw said in January 2016: "There is nothing more to be said. That's the end of the proceedings, that the defendant is dead". Liz Dux, a solicitor for six of Janner's alleged abuse victims, said that claims against the estate would be made in the civil courts. However, in March 2017, three of the claimants dropped their civil suits, followed by six more in May, signalling an end to all civil actions against his estate.

In an interview with The Times, the Janner family declared, "Our father's reputation as a man who devoted his life to good has been restored." His son, Daniel Janner, stated, "These false accusers, having dropped their claim because they risk being cross-examined, can no longer form the basis of this strand. Accordingly, the existence of this strand undermines the integrity of the important work of the inquiry."

On 15 January 2016, further allegations of abuse were made by twelve former residents of children's homes; Janner had regularly visited homes in Leicestershire in the 1970s and 1980s. The BBC had traced and interviewed dozens of men and women who lived at Leicestershire children's homes in that period. It had also "spoken to council officials, social workers, police officers and journalists involved" in the Frank Beck investigation. Solicitors were representing at least 20 men and one woman, including the 12 residents of children's homes, who say Janner had abused them. Police said they have information from 25 alleged victims.

The report of the retired High Court judge Sir Richard Henriques concerning the earlier investigations of allegations made against Janner was published in January 2016. The CPS and Leicestershire police were again criticised in his independent report, and he concluded that there had been sufficient evidence to make probable a successful prosecution of Janner in 1991, 2002 and 2007.

In 1991, the police had not checked whether Janner had shared a hotel room with a 14-year-old boy (known as "Complainant 1"), and had made only "extremely limited" checks at the children's home where he lived. It was found two decades later that the child had attended a wedding with the Janner family, and that film footage existed of his presence. The 2002 investigation was connected with allegations of historic abuse at a children's home, in which a former resident made accusations against Janner: "The failure to forward Complainant 2's statement to the CPS for charging advice is remarkable", Henriques wrote. It was suggested that Leicestershire police should have passed the file about the 2002 investigation on to the CPS (as the CPS had admitted), and Henriques advocated this inaction be investigated by the Independent Police Complaints Commission (IPCC).

The Independent Inquiry Into Child Sexual Abuse announced on 16 November 2016 that it was delaying its hearings into Janner due to a "significant overlap" between its investigation and the criminal proceedings, which could cause prejudice in court.

In 2019, Daniel Janner founded the group Falsely Accused Individuals for Reform, which aims to prevent the names of people accused of sexual offences from being made public until/unless they are charged. That July, Carl Beech, whose accusations had fuelled the Operation Midland police investigation, was convicted of falsely accusing Janner and others of sexual abuse and murder. Daniel Janner appeared in the witness box as Beech was being sentenced and said of his father, "He died an innocent man. He was a force for good and justice." Beech was jailed for 18 years. Janner was critical of the role in the affair of Tom Watson, saying: "Tom Watson should resign. He appointed himself Britain's chief paedo-finder general and created a moral panic. His motive was personal political advancement riding on a bandwagon of public frenzy which he had whipped up. He should hang his head in shame. For him to take the moral high ground in the Labour Party against antisemitism is completely hypocritical."

Janner's daughter, Rabbi Laura Janner-Klausner, said: "We have a system where people are believed instantly before the evidence is examined instead of being listened to compassionately and the allegations properly investigated. People were able to accuse (my father) without a shred of evidence and were believed straight away." Janner-Klausner was criticised by Migdal Emunah, a charity which supports victims of sexual abuse in the Jewish community, for using her position as a senior rabbi to discredit the allegations against her father.

== Books ==
The books up to 1968 are listed in Who's Who 1974, London: A. & C. Black, 1974, p. 1708

- (1962) Farming and the Law, Business Books
- (1962) The Lawyer and his World, Business Books
- (1962) The Businessman's Lawyer and Legal Lexicon
- (1963) The Retailer's Lawyer, Business Books
- (1963) All You Need To Know about the Law, Business Books
- (1964) Motorists : Know Your Law, Business Books
- (1964) You and the Law, Business Books
- (1964) The Personnel Manager's Lawyer and Employer's Guide to the Law, Business Books
- (1965) Your Factory and the Law, Business Books
- (1966) The Sales Executive's Lawyer, Business Books
- (1966) Your Property and the Law, Business Books
- (1968) The Director's Lawyer, Business Books
- (1978) The Motorist's Lawyer, Royal Automobile Club
- (1979) Product Liability, Random House Business Books
- (1985) Janner's Complete Letterwriter
- (1986) On Meetings, Gower Publishing
- (1989) On Chairing, Gower Publishing
- (1989) On Presentation, Random House Business Books
- (1991) How to Win Meetings, Gower Publishing
- (1998) One Hand Alone Cannot Clap: Arab Israeli Universe, Robson Books
- (2003) Janner's Speechmaker, Thorogood
- (2003) To Life! The Memoirs of Greville Janner, Sutton Publishing (foreword by Tony Blair)
- (2008) Jewish Parliamentarians (with Derek Taylor)

== Arms ==
Coat of arms of Greville Janner
Crest A hippopotamus statant Gules in the mouth an orchid Argent slipped and leaved Vert. Escutcheon Paly of four Vert and Gules a pile terminating interlaced with a triangle reversed between two piles each terminating in a fleurs-de-lis Argent. Supporters On either side a rabbit sejant erect Argent that on the dexter gorged with a plain collar holding in the exterior paw a top hat Gules and that on the sinister gorged with a plain collar Vert and holding in the exterior paw a sword point upwards Argent hilt pommel and quillons Vert.

== See also ==
- List of Bishop's College School alumni

Parliament of the United Kingdom
Preceded by Sir Barnett Janner	Member of Parliament for Leicester North West; 1970–1974	Constituency abolished
New constituency	Member of Parliament for Leicester West; 1974–1997	Succeeded by Patricia Hewitt
