= Machon L'Madrichei Chutz La'Aretz =

Israeli youth leader institute

Machon Le Madrichim (hebr. for " Institute for Youth Leaders"), officially known as Machon L'Madrichei Chutz La'Aretz (Hebrew: מכון למדריכי חוץ לארץ; "Institute for Youth Leaders from Abroad"), is a gathering of young people in Jerusalem from different Zionist youth movements (tnuat noar) which educate and strengthen youth leadership, focused on Israel and Zionism.

Machon is a tool to implement a common vision through Zionist youth movements.

Machon integrates the methods of informal outreach, appropriate to the world of youth movements, with a focus on formal and content-driven activities to develop a sense of commitment to themselves, their communities, Israel and the Jewish people. All this in order to foster graduates of the programs to become agents of change in their home communities and encourage them to contribute in different ways to transform Israel as a state and strengthen its Jewish and democratic identity.

== Basics ==
The Machon Le Madrichim (MLM) holds four core believes:

1. Guided by content: A belief that to become an effective Jewish leader, and also for education and culture per se, members must possess a basic understanding of core content areas of Jewish life and particularly the place of Israel within the Jewish people. The contents of the MLM program is organized around five areas: Zionism, Jewish history, Judaism, Leadership and Hebrew. The objective is not limited only to the acquisition of knowledge, but based on the same development of self-understanding and values which in turn lead to actions.
2. Leadership and action: MLM believes in the importance of the development of Jewish leadership and activists around the world, both in the short term, as hadracha (leadership) providers and activities in their own movements, answering the needs of key partners in the youth movements, and in the long term, the development of effective leadership for the Jewish people in Israel and the Jewish diaspora. MLM graduates return to their communities and become active in leadership positions, while working with a wide variety of organizations and youth movements. Stressing the importance of training agents of social change and that these leaders should be treated with mutual respect.
3. Open and pluralistic environment: MLM believes that the essential component in developing Jewish guides and educators is an open educational vision that is able to challenge existing beliefs and opinions and encourage openness to new ideas and different beliefs, whether it's in the political, religious or educational arenas. MLM aims at creating an environment where members can connect with Jews who come from diverse backgrounds and beliefs and learn from each other in an atmosphere of tolerance and acceptance. At the center of this vision is the attempt to create a truly diverse educational community, and creating a space to provide for each individual's personal development process, from which they can choose their own path.
4. Development of core commitments: MLM believes in the importance of community as the principle of kol Israel arevim ze laze ("all Jews are responsible for each other"), and its graduates have an active commitment and involvement with the Jewish people with Israel at its center. The graduates examine, define, and strengthen their Jewish identity, their connection with the various dimensions of Israel and within that to develop a love of Israel and learning what the meaning of Zionism is for them, including the belief in the importance of building relationships and true cooperation between Israelis and Jews outside of Israel.

== History ==
The Machon opened in 1946, at the initiative of World Zionist Organization (WZO) before the creation of the state of Israel. At that time the main mission was for Machon to be a training program for youth movement graduates outside of Israel, to help them meet the central challenge of Zionism, to encourage allies and settlement in Israel as the main objectives of the movements. The first group of students, 30 Jewish high school graduates from South Africa, were housed at an agricultural school near Ness Ziona. In 1949, the Machon moved to a building in the Katamon neighborhood of Jerusalem. Since 1972, it has usually been located in East Talpiot.

During its history, over 20,000 young people from around the world have been trained to occupy influential positions among the Jewish people. The contribution of the Machon graduates can be found in the leadership of Jewish communities in Jewish-Zionist education, as well as in public life in Israel. Almost a third of Machon graduates made Aliyah and were integrated into different areas of life in Israel, and have had a significant influence on the existence of Israel as a Jewish and democratic state. Participants have traveled from most countries of South and Central America, Australia and New Zealand, United States and Canada, South Africa, North Africa, France, Great Britain and many others countries from the 1950s, and more recently from the Commonwealth of Independent States.

== Structure ==
At this time, Machon is composed of four departments that serve more than 500 students per year. Each of the departments works with different audiences and to its values and principles, specifically:

1. English speakers
2. Latin American languages (Spanish, Portuguese) speakers
3. Russian speakers
4. Machon Ma'ayan (religious division)

There was also for some time a program for French speakers.

=== Machon English-speakers ===
Works with the majority of youth movements in the English-speaking world. It operates two cycles per year – The cycle north to the students from England, Europe and the United States, conducted between September and December; the student cycle geared to Australia and South Africa is conducted between February and June. In total, approximately 120 English speakers complete the program each year. Since 2006, there has been a small group of Israeli students that join the British program (known as "P2K" or "Shutfut 2000"), coming from the area of the Galilee.

=== Latin America ===
Works with ten youth groups from ten countries in Central and South America. It also works in two cycles per year – the first conducted between March and June, and the second between September and December. In total, over 300 youth leaders complete this program, known as "Machon Amla't" each year.

== Program ==
The Machon offers 17- to 19-year-olds an intensive one-year program to strengthen their leadership skills and enhance their knowledge of Judaism, Zionism, Jewish history, Hebrew and Israeli society. The program includes touring, volunteer work in development towns and kibbutzim, and encounters with Israelis to strengthen ties to Israel.

- Groups (Chavura). Most departments divide the members into small groups of about 20 students each called "chavurot" (groups). There are the core groups in the Machon structure that function on a smaller scale and has at least two weekly meetings that help students to feel "at home" within the plan. Each is led by a group educator.
- Community involvement and volunteering. In almost all departments a half a day is spent on involvement in the wider community of Israel. This involvement can take the form of volunteer work with the elderly, the disabled or at-risk populations. Students are taught how to implement political and social action, to understand and act others and thus promote important issues or values in Israel. Meetings are held with various groups of Israelis, for example, soldiers in the army, Ethiopian immigrants, Arab-Israelis and Orthodox Jews.
- Tours and activities. Each department has 3-4 day trips to different parts of Israel, especially the north and south. There are also weekly excursions to visit interesting places in Jerusalem and in the downtown area of the country.
- Acculturation time. Various departments work together with the youth movements spending half a day per week at a time when groups of different movements, building a cultural identity, and debating relevant ideological and educational issues that interest each group.

== Alumni society ==
The Machon Alumni society, Irgun Bogrei Machon Le'Madrichei Chul (ארגון בוגרי מכון למדריכי חו"ל) is a Registered Non Profit Organisation in Israel.
