= Edgware & Hendon Reform Synagogue =

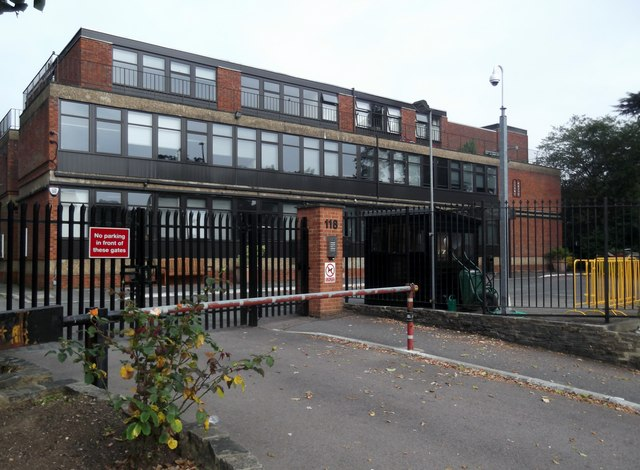

- Location of the synagogue in Greater London

Religion
- Affiliation: Reform Judaism
- Ecclesiastical or organisational status: Synagogue
- Leadership: Rabbi Mark Goldsmith
- Status: Active

Location
- Location: 118 Stonegrove, Edgware, Borough of Barnet, London, England
- Country: United Kingdom
- Coordinates: 51°37′08″N 0°17′19″W

Architecture
- Established: 2017 (merged congregation): 1934 (Edgware); 1949 (Hendon)
- Completed: 1950s

Website
- ehrs.uk

Edgware & Hendon Reform Synagogue is a Reform Jewish congregation and synagogue, located at 118 Stonegrove, Edgware, in the London Borough of Barnet, England, in the United Kingdom. The congregation is a member of the Movement for Progressive Judaism and was formed in 2017 as a result of the merger between the Edgware and District Reform Synagogue and the Hendon Reform Synagogue communities. The merged community is located on the site of the former Edgware and District Reform Synagogue.

In 2019 Mark Goldsmith became senior rabbi.

== History ==
Logo of the congregation

=== Edgware and District Reform Synagogue ===
Edgware and District Reform Synagogue originated as "Edgware and District Progressive Jewish Fellowship" and in February 1935 became "Edgware and District Reform Synagogue".

In late 1934, a temporary committee was formed to discuss the establishment of a new Reform congregation in London and in on 12 February 1935 it was formally decided to form a synagogue to be called "Edgware and District Reform Synagogue".

=== Hendon Reform Synagogue ===
Hendon Reform Synagogue was founded in 1949 and its first building, in 1955, was at 1 Danescroft Avenue, Hendon.

The congregation of Hendon Reform Synagogue began to meet in 1949, though meetings were held in the homes of the founder members until the first synagogue, now the Kingsley Fisher Hall [named after founders Sidney Kingsley and Ben Fisher], was built several years later. Services were held in the Methodist Meeting Hall in the Burroughs and as the congregation grew, in other local halls whilst they dreamt of having their own building. In 1950 a disused tennis club became available and was purchased for the sum of £2,600 with funds raised from donations and social events, and at last HRS had a plot on which to place a building. Work was completed in 1955 and a consecration service for the new synagogue building was held on 6 March by the rabbi, Arthur Katz.

Up until its merger, the congregation's senior rabbi was Steven Katz, who succeeded his father, Arthur Katz. The synagogue building was closed after its 2017 merger.

== The merger ==
In 2016, after a series of meetings in both HRS and EDRS, members overwhelmingly voted to merge. A new entity, Edgware & Hendon Reform Synagogue, was formed on EDRS's former ground, and the inaugural service on Saturday (Shabbat) 15 July 2017 was attended by a huge congregation and also by civic leaders of the local community. The new community is named Edgware & Hendon Reform Synagogue in English and LeDor Vador in Hebrew (the latter also being the name of its monthly magazine).

== Notable members ==
- Sam Little (born 1975), professional golfer

== See also ==
- History of the Jews in England
- List of Jewish communities in the United Kingdom
- List of synagogues in the United Kingdom
