= Battersea Park funfair disaster =

1972 roller coaster disaster

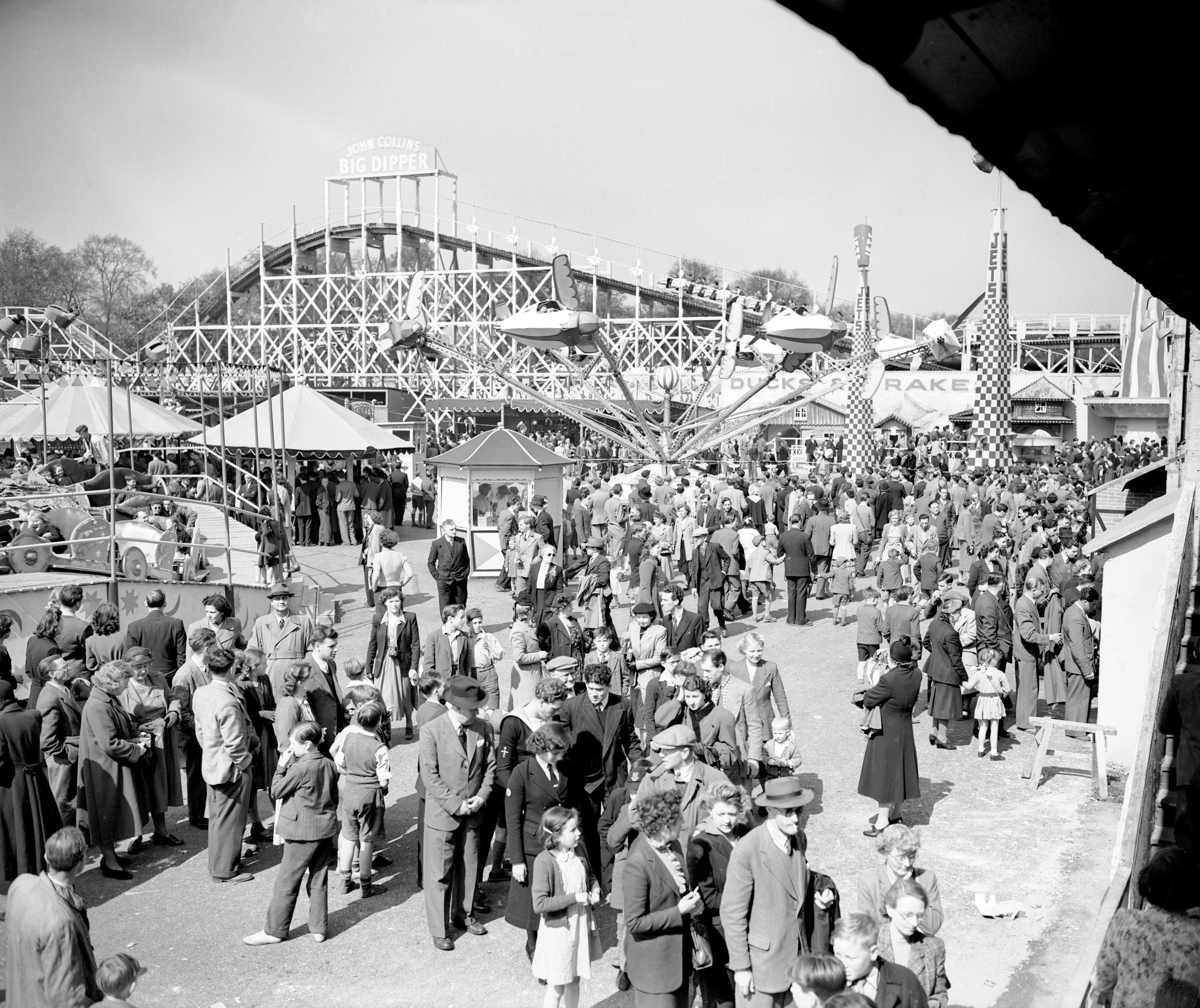
- View of the ride in 1951
- Date: 30 May 1972
- Location: Battersea Park, London; 51.4794°N 0.1569°W
- Type: Accident
- Deaths: 5
- Injuries: 13

The Battersea Park funfair disaster happened in Battersea Park, London, on 30 May 1972; five children died and thirteen were injured when a wooden roller coaster train came off its tracks. A report after the crash found 51 faults on the ride. The ride manager and engineer were subsequently tried for and acquitted of manslaughter.

== Accident ==
The accident occurred on the afternoon of Tuesday 30 May 1972 on the John Collins Big Dipper roller coaster at the funfair in Battersea Park, London, which opened in 1951 as part of the Festival of Britain. A train being hoisted to the start of the ride broke loose from its haulage rope. The emergency rollback brake failed, causing the carriages to roll backwards towards the station. Despite the efforts of the brakeman, the train gathered speed and the back carriage jumped the rails and crashed through a barrier with the other two carriages crashing on top of it. Five children were killed and thirteen others injured; one child, whose sister died, had life-changing injuries.

The Independent newspaper published a story in 2015 recalling the accident, prompted by an accident at Alton Towers in which 16 people were injured, four seriously. Regarding the 1972 accident, Carolyn Adamczyk, a passenger on the ride during the accident, said: "As soon as we started shooting backwards everything went into slow motion... I turned around and saw the brake man desperately trying to put the brake on but it wasn’t working. Most of the carriages didn’t go around the bend, one detached and went off the side through a wooden hoarding. People were groaning and hanging over the edge. It was awful."

== Criminal trial ==
Three men were charged with manslaughter and a committal hearing was started at Wandsworth Magistrates' Court on 26 February 1973. The court heard that, after a fire had damaged the ride in 1970, second-hand stock, more than fifty years old, had been bought to replace it. The dog brake on this train had not operated when the rope broke, allowing it to run backwards. The structure, including the pedestrian emergency walkway, was in a rotted and unsafe condition, so that one victim who survived the initial impact fell through the handrail to her death. A report on the roller coaster after the crash revealed 51 faults on the ride.

The manager of the ride and its inspecting engineer were committed for trial. A lengthy hearing at the Old Bailey included testimony that the Big Dipper had had mechanical problems during the weeks preceding the disaster, including another instance of a train running backwards and not being stopped by the brake, that managers were often drunk and teenaged staff used drugs, and that the brakeman on the accident run had been told to leave and had never been questioned by the police. On 20 November 1973 both the accused were acquitted. They were defended by George Carman QC and Lewis Hawser QC, respectively.

== Civil trial ==
In 1975 Arun Thakur, a crash victim, sued the son of the owner in the High Court and was awarded £5,500 in damages.

== Funfair closure and memorial ==
The Big Dipper was replaced with a modern steel roller coaster known as The Cyclone, but the funfair's popularity remained low. The accident along with development problems led to the fair's closure on 22 September 1974.

The site of the disaster is no longer accessible to the public. After a campaign by survivors for a memorial at the park, a cherry tree was planted there by the Mayor of Wandsworth on 30 May 2022, the 50th anniversary. An accompanying plaque commemorates the five children who died.
