= Daniel Janner =

British lawyer (born 1957)

The Honourable Daniel Janner KC
- Born: Daniel Joseph Mitchell Janner; 27 April 1957 (age 69); London, England
- Education: Trinity Hall, Cambridge
- Occupation: KC
- Father: Greville Janner
- Relatives: Barnett Janner (grandfather)

The Hon. Daniel Joseph Mitchell Janner KC (born 27 April 1957) is a British King's Counsel, specialising in criminal law. He is the founder of the FAIR (Falsely Accused Individuals for Reform) campaign, through which he has played a key role in pushing for legislation to give anonymity to those accused of sex offences.

== Early life ==
He is the son of Greville Janner, former Labour MP, member of the House of Lords and co-founder of the Holocaust Educational Trust, and the grandson of the Labour MP and peer Barnett Janner.

== Education ==
Janner was educated at University College School and Trinity Hall, Cambridge, where he won the Dr Cooper's Law Studentship in 1979 and graduated with an MA (Cantab.) in the subject. He was the President of the Cambridge Union Society and was on its Board of Trustees. He was subsequently a Jules Thorn scholar at the Middle Temple.

== Career ==
Janner was called to the Bar in 1980 (Middle Temple) and took Silk in 2002. He is the consulting editor of the Criminal Appeal Reports. He was made a bencher of Middle Temple in 2009. He is known for his legal work on the Heysel Stadium disaster, the Knightsbridge Security Deposit robbery, and his work with Cliff Richard and Paul Gambaccini on the FAIR campaign, launching a petition which received over 27,000 signatures and received an official response from Parliament.

== Politics ==
In 1983 Janner was the Labour parliamentary candidate for Bosworth, where a combination of adverse boundary changes – most notably the removal of the Labour-leaning town of Coalville from the constituency – and the existence of a Social Democratic Party (SDP) candidate conspired to leave him in third place with only 19.5 per cent of the vote.

General election 1983: Bosworth
Party	Candidate	Votes	%	±%
Conservative	Adam Butler	31,663	55.4	
SDP	Malcolm Fox	14,369	25.1	New
Labour	Daniel Janner	11,120	19.5	
Majority		17,294	30.3	
Turnout		57,152	78.2	
Conservative hold		Swing		

Janner's politics then moved rightward: having abandoned Labour for the SDP in 1985, within a year he had joined the Conservative Party, dismissing his short-lived Social Democratic affiliation as a "waste of time" and declaring that his new party was the only place to fight the advance of the Militant tendency. From 1996 to 1999 he was the Director of Research for the Society of Conservative Lawyers.

== Personal life ==
Janner is married with 3 children and 5 grandchildren.
