= After Dark (TV programme) =

British late night live discussion programme

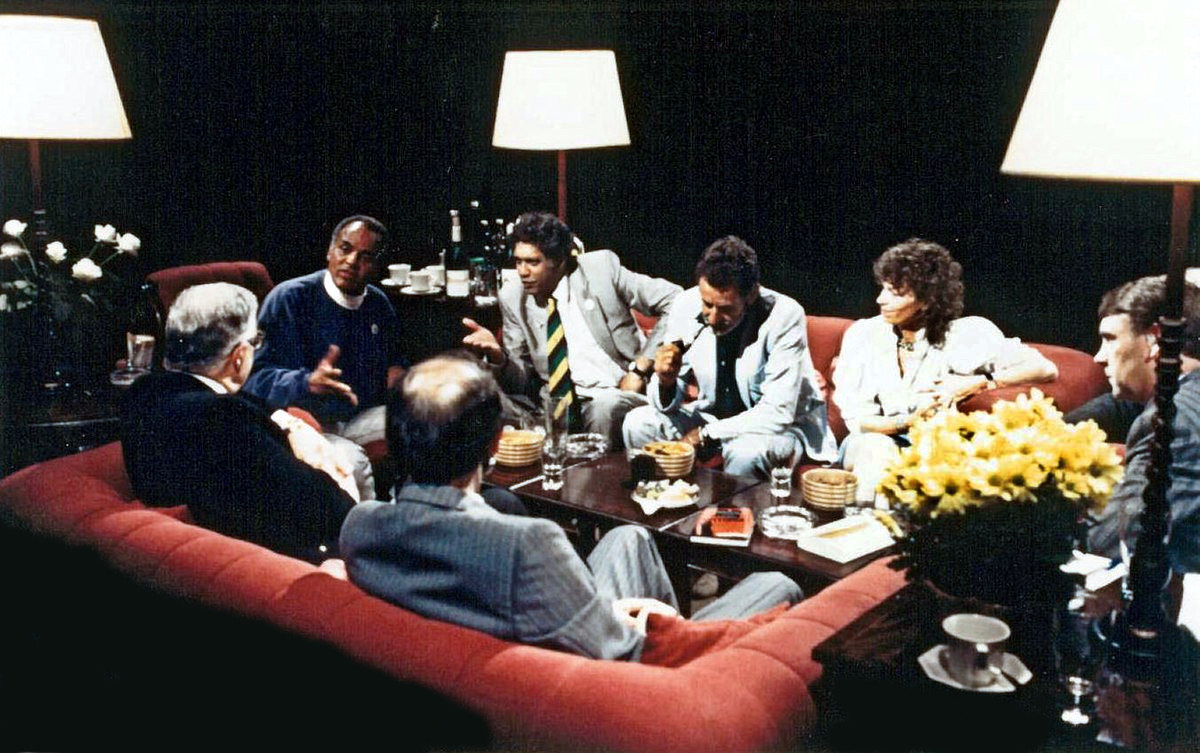
- "South Africa" 11 June 1988
- Created by: Open Media
- Country of origin: United Kingdom
- Original language: English
- No. of episodes: 90 (list of episodes)

Production
- Running time: Open-ended

Original release
- Network: Channel 4 (1987–1991, 1993–1997); BBC Four (2003)
- Release: 1 May 1987 – 29 March 2003

After Dark was a British late-night live television discussion programme that was broadcast weekly on Channel 4 between 1987 and 1991, and which returned for specials between 1993 and 1997. It was later revived by the BBC for a single series, broadcast on BBC Four in 2003.

Roly Keating of the BBC described it as "one of the great television talk formats of all time". In 2010, the television trade magazine Broadcast wrote, "After Dark defined the first 10 years of Channel 4, just as Big Brother did for the second" and in 2018 the programme was cited in an editorial in The Times as an example of high-quality television.

Broadcast live and with no scheduled end time, the series, inspired by an Austrian programme called Club 2, was considered to be a groundbreaking reinvention of the discussion programme format. The programme was hosted by a variety of presenters, and each episode had around half a dozen guests, often including a member of the public.

Open Media, the company that produced After Dark, acquired rights to its own back catalogue from Channel 4. The production company now offers clips of the series for paid licensing.

== Premise ==
After Dark featured a different topic each week, with guests selected to provoke lively discussion. Subject matter included "the treatment of children, of the mentally ill, of prisoners, and about class, cash and racial and sexual difference", as well as "matters of exceptional sensitivity to the then Thatcher government, such as state secrecy or the Troubles in Northern Ireland"; "places further afield ... – Chile, Eritrea, Iran, Iraq, Israel, Nicaragua, South Africa and Russia – featured regularly" and "less apparently solemn subjects – sport, fashion, gambling and pop music – were in the mix from the start".

Other memorable conversations included footballer Garth Crooks disputing the future of the game with politician Sir Rhodes Boyson and MP Teresa Gorman walking out of a discussion about unemployment with Billy Bragg. Other guests included "poets and pornographers, spies and solicitors, feminists and farmers, witches and whalers, judges and journalists". The Daily Telegraph said "the discussion was open-ended. It would stop when the guests decided the debate was over, not when TV executives said so". In 2014 an academic book summed up the series as: "After Dark created an unprecedented climate which encouraged spaces where the process of thinking could be brought to light".

== History ==
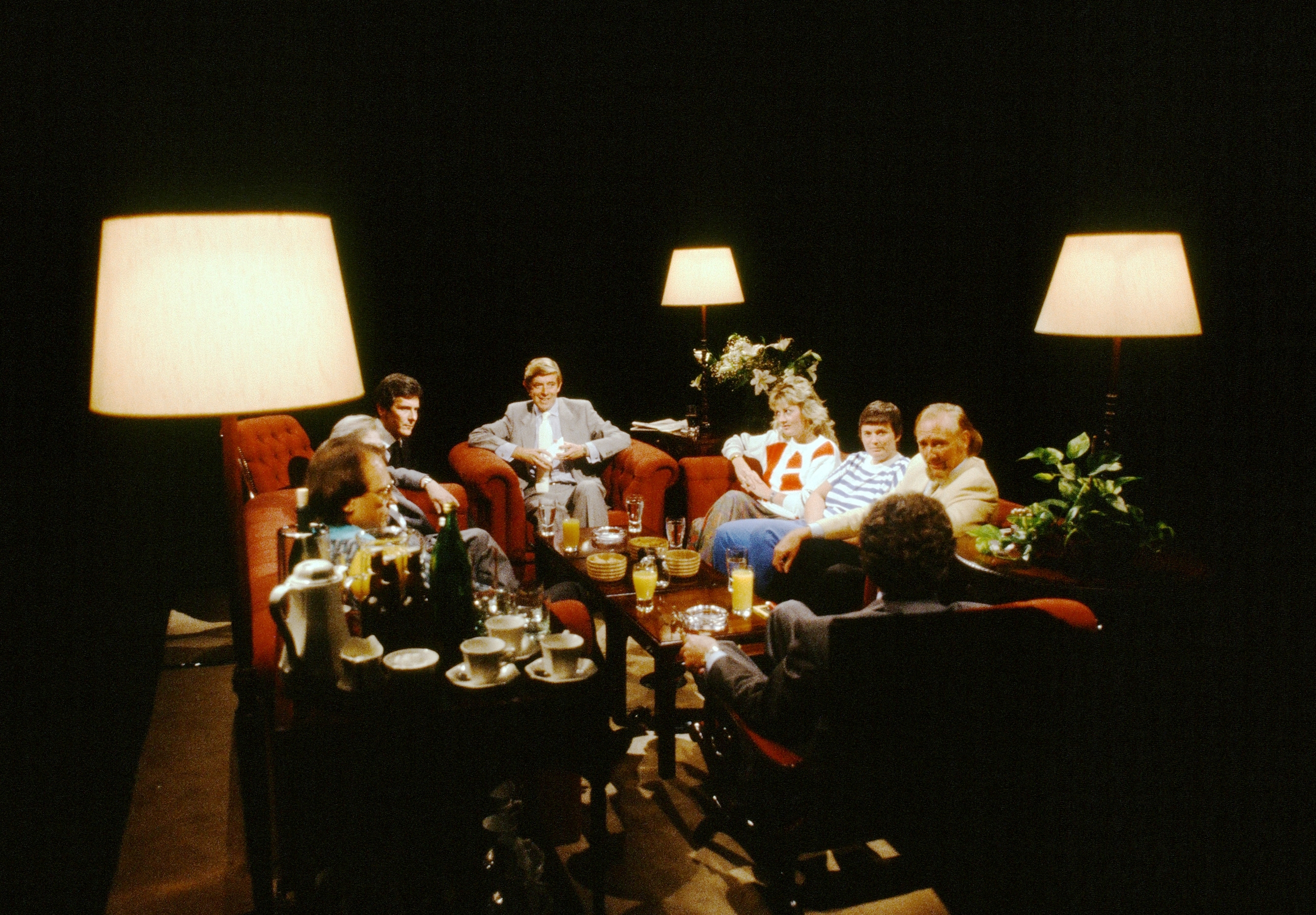
"Money", 13 August 1988

From late April in 1987, Channel 4 screened a Nighttime strand, a mixture of films and discussion programmes that ran until 3am on Thursdays, Fridays and Saturdays. Channel 4 launched After Dark in an open-ended format broadcast on Friday nights (later Saturday nights), as an original piece of programming that would be inexpensive to produce. There was no 'chair', simply a 'host', and the discussion took place around a coffee table in a darkened studio. Due to its late-night scheduling the series was dubbed After Closing Time by the BBC1 comedy series Alas Smith and Jones.

Jeremy Isaacs, the founding Chief Executive of Channel 4, said that the programme allowed him to realise one of his longest-held ambitions: "When I first started in television at Granada... Sidney Bernstein said to me that the worst words ever uttered on TV were, I'm sorry, that's all we have time for. Especially since they were always uttered just as someone was about to say something really interesting." After Dark would only end when its guests had nothing more to say.

The series was made by production company Open Media. The series editor, Sebastian Cody, talking about the programme in an interview in 2003, said: "Reality TV is artificial. After Dark is real in the sense that what you see is what you get, which isn't the case with something that's been edited to give the illusion of being real. Other shows wind people up with booze beforehand, then when they're actually on the programme they give them glasses of water. We give our guests nothing until they arrive on set and then they can drink orange juice, or have a bottle of wine. And we let them go to the loo."

The media academic David Lee described the programme:

A topical talk show format that allowed quite unique forms of political and personal discussion evolve and take place on British television ... After Dark was created as a counterpoint to the dominant (and rather conventional) talk show ecology of the time, which included the 'twin pillars' of broadcasting talk, Parkinson and Question Time ... Participants were encouraged to discuss a topic intensively but also exhaustively, until there was no more to say. It also encouraged a more reflective kind of discussion, with guests often modifying their original position as a result of the interactions on the show ... The format encouraged dissent, controversy and also reflective frankness ... Its lack of a determined end point was critical, ensuring an open-ended, somewhat indeterminate quality to proceedings ... Participants were often positioned as outside of the mainstream political and social agenda, and the programme relished its outsider status.

== Notable guests and programmes ==
=== Series One ===
==== Peter Hain, Clive Ponting, Peter Utley, Colin Wallace and "Secrets" ====
The first ever After Dark programme (1 May 1987) was described in The Listener:

After Dark made a historic breakthrough by rediscovering the structure of adult conversation: the ingredients are intelligence, candour and courage, and the absence of impeding structures such as television time barriers. Seven people talked live, from midnight to the early hours of the morning, on a subject dear to our hearts – and at the moment costly to our nerves – secrets. Clive Ponting, ex MOD; Anne-Marie Sandler, French psychiatrist; Peter Hain, former anti-apartheid campaigner; Colin Wallace, former army "information officer" engaged in psychological warfare in Northern Ireland in the Seventies; Mrs Margaret Moore, widow of one of the computer scientists who have died recently in mysterious circumstances; Isaac Evans, a farmer who campaigns against bureaucratic secrecy, and T. E. Utley, Times political columnist, who still believes Section 2 of the Official Secrets Act "has a point" – all these discussed frankly their experiences and their perception of the consequences of excessive secrecy.

Nancy Banks-Smith wrote in The Guardian:

A bit of fun, a bit of excitement, and, quite the best idea for a television programme since men sat around the camp fire talking while, in the darkness, watching eyes glowed red ... It will be many a midnight before Channel 4 comes up with the subject so on the ball as Secrets and such an enthralling group of guests. Who, you may reasonably ask, is Isaac Evans? He described himself as "a peasant up from the country" ... In old age he has, with great simplicity, taken up the cause of small people ruined by secret files ... Peter Hain and Clive Ponting (were) referred to affectionately by the chairman, Tony Wilson, as "You two gaolbirds" ... It was suggested that only half a dozen MI5 men were watching After Dark. "On double time," said (Colin) Wallace and gave them a wave.

The programme finished with the Beatles singing "Do You Want to Know a Secret?" The programme is available online here.

==== Simon Hughes ====
The second programme of the first series – transmitted on 8 May 1987 – centred on press ethics and featured, among others, Tony Blackburn, Peter Tatchell, Victoria Gillick, Johnny Edgecombe and a Private Eye journalist. A week later After Dark broadcast the following correction in relation to the British Member of Parliament Simon Hughes: "Mr Hughes has asked us to say that he is not a homosexual, has never been a homosexual and has no intention of becoming a homosexual in the future." Nearly twenty years after the correction, Hughes came out as bisexual.

==== "Do the British Love Their Children?" ====
As described by academic Nick Basannavar in 2021:

For its fourth week, journalist Chantal Cuer chaired ... "Do the British Love Their Children?" The trigger for that particular topic was the case of four-year old Kimberley Carlile, starved and murdered by her stepfather Nigel Hall ... Carlile's former foster father, Gordon Whiteley, participated in After Dark. He was joined, amongst others, by the critic Germaine Greer, Lambeth Council leader Linda Bellos and the former headmaster of Westminster School, John Rae. During the live show, Bellos stated her belief that British 'society' had neither demonstrated that it liked children, nor made any provision for children to live fully within it. Greer argued that mating couples who bore children ought not to be entrusted with raising them alone. Rae, meanwhile, felt that the thought of parenthood without at least some violence performed on the child, such as smacking, was 'unreal' - although as long as any violent act performed was carried out 'within love', it was containable.

==== David Mellor, David Yallop and "The Mafia" ====
The Financial Times described the following week's discussion about the Mafia:

After Dark may well be cheap but is one of the most interesting innovations for years ... Two factors give the programme a special character: its length, which allows time for both personal reminiscence and discussion of theory or principle without that "I must stop you there" malarkey; and the camera arrangements with the participants set in a pool of light within a darkened studio, producing a peculiarly powerful sense of intimacy for late night ... The combination of Home Office minister David Mellor, former Cosa Nostra "bagman" Bob Dick, former Scotland Yard intelligence officer Frank Pulley (who made particularly astute political and social comments), New York undercover policeman Douglas le Vien and several journalists who write about organised crime, proved highly productive. After Dark bears out what has long been said: that ordinary discussion programmes have the time only to establish the participants' credentials before going off the air. This programme establishes credentials, moves on to discussion of the principles, and sometimes even manages some interesting conclusions. The points made in the final 15 minutes last Friday, about the differences between Britain and the US in attitudes towards wealth, and the way in which this might explain the puzzling (albeit pleasing) failure, so far, of organised crime in Britain, were the most interesting of the entire discussion. Do not switch on for a "taste" telling yourself that you will go to bed at 1.00. You will still be there at 3.00.

During the programme it was claimed that Pope John Paul I was "eliminated ... because he discovered that mafia profits from heroin had been laundered using the Vatican Bank". "Spectacular corruption allegations from author David Yallop" were described by The Observer as follows:

Perched in the gallery above, a Channel 4 lawyer nervously watches in case the stew bubbles over. His worst moment came at 1.30 yesterday morning when David Yallop ... cut short some coy evasions about who heads PII, the Italian variety of freemasonry, by naming him. The lawyer was quietly told that Mr Yallop had just named a senior minister in the Italian Government. Mr Yallop had not gone so far in his book. He also suggested that a member of the British Cabinet was on the board of the same company as some members of PII. Since After Dark, unlike most radio phone-ins, boasts no tape delay, the alleged defamation could not be prevented.

Chris Horrie and Peter Chippendale detail what followed: "the story had caused horror among the country's journalists, who waited breathlessly for a shower of writs to descend on the programme makers ... But although hacks who missed the show swapped videos and endlessly replayed extracts for snippets of information, nothing happened to the programme makers." Some years later David Mellor and writer Gaia Servadio described how their friendship started on the programme.

==== Teresa Gorman and "Is Britain Working?" ====
On 12 June 1987, the night after the British General Election, "the first day of the third term of Thatcherism – a show called Is Britain Working? brought together victorious Tory MP Teresa Gorman; 'Red Wedge' pop singer Billy Bragg; Helen from the Stonehenge Convoy; old colonialist Colonel Hilary Hook ... and Adrian, one of the jobless. It was a perfect example of the chemistry you can get. There were unlikely alliances (Bragg and Hook) and Mrs Gorman" "stormed off the set, claiming she had been misled about the nature of the programme" "She told the leftist pop singer Billy Bragg: 'You and your kind are finished. We are the future now.'" Bragg said "I sing in smokey rooms every night and I can keep talking for far longer than you can Teresa". Bragg explained later: "She was so smug. And because she was Essex I took it personally. Then she accused me of being a fine example of Thatcherism."

The Independent said:

... the wonderful open-ended discussion show mused through the early hours of Saturday ... someone took umbrage ... It was Mrs Gorman, marching away beyond the table lamps into the outer darkness ... "Now we'll have a civilised discussion", said Billy Bragg.

==== "Killing with Care?" ====
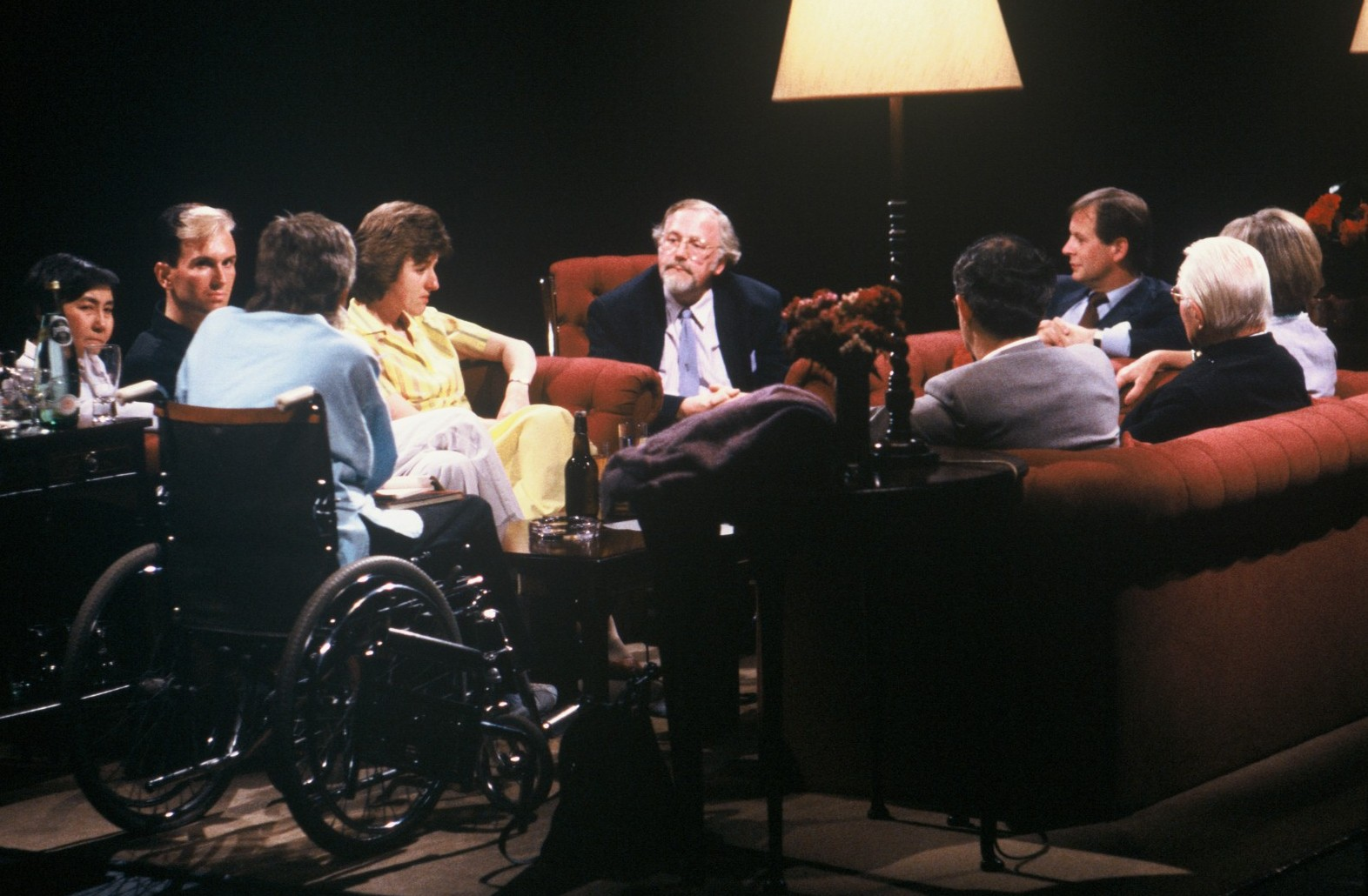
"Killing with Care?" on 26 June 1987

The programme the following week was described by ITN as "A discussion on euthanasia, with the controversial Dutch doctor Piet Admiraal who has performed euthanasia; British Socialist and Methodist preacher Lord Soper; the founder of the Cancer support charity 'Cancerbackup', Dr Vicky Clement-Jones (in an appearance from her death bed – she died shortly after the end of this programme), quadraplegic Maggie Davis, Catholic philosopher John Finnis, a gay man and the founder of a hospice."

And, from a comment in The Guardian in 2012:

"Off the top of my head I remember ... a group of witches ... and a heart-breaking discussion on euthanasia with a lot of people about to die. There has never been anything else like it."

==== Edward Teller and "Peace in Our Time" ====
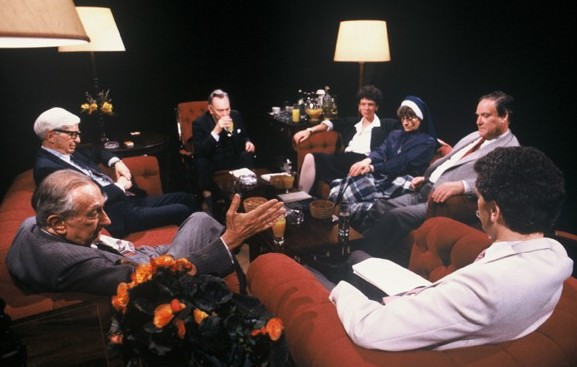
"Peace in Our Time" on 3 July 1987 with Enoch Powell

The programme on 3 July 1987 "saw the father of the H-bomb Edward Teller concede that he lobbied for the worst of all weapons because of what the Russians had done to his country".

==== Jacques Vergès and "Klaus Barbie" ====
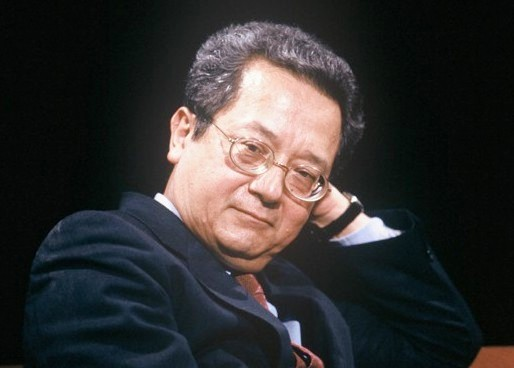
Jacques Vergès appearing on After Dark in July 1987

After Dark, "ending its ten-week trial run, has been a remarkable success" wrote The Independent in July 1987. "The series has brought to television the rare acts of listening, thinking and thorough and subtle discussion ... In the small hours of Saturday morning, Maitre Jacques Vergès, defence counsel to the Butcher of Lyons, leaned back on a sofa with a half-glass of something pale and put his case. A journalist and a canon and a Resistance fighter and a concentration camp survivor listened and put theirs." Vergès said "the reason people were still prosecuted for massacring Jews was because the Jews were white; if they had not been, the crimes would have been swept under the carpet long ago."

The Guardian described what happened:

[After Dark] had Maitre Vergès on a panel that discussed whether it was ever desirable, or even possible, to forgive [Klaus] Barbie 43 years after his crimes ... Vergès attempted to indict French crimes in Africa, imperial crimes everywhere ... It was canon Paul Oestreicher who isolated from the trial the real distinction between Barbie and the Nazi regime [and] the imperial brutality Vergès wanted to expose: the unique evil was that the Nazis built a system and a policy for the extermination of whole peoples.

The Sunday Times:

Vergès is clearly a man who knows how not to lose an argument even when he cannot win it, but there was a moment when his mind-boggling calm was almost shattered. It came when a young American lawyer [ Eli Rosenbaum ] announced that he had flown in for the programme specifically to confront Vergès with evidence of his anti-Semitic, right-wing connections and general moral corruption. It was a moment of high drama, but it was the outraged American who cracked first. "You're losing your temper," the old maitre instructed him. "That is no way for a good lawyer to make his case." Game and set, if not match, to Vergès.

Jewish Telegraphic Agency:

[Rosenbaum] angered Verges by asking why there was an anti-Zionist, anti-Israel element in so many of the cases he has defended in the last 30 years. He also questioned the Siam-born lawyer about his alleged connections with a wealthy Swiss neo-Nazi. Verges avoided direct answers but made remarks about Rosenbaum's Jewish affiliation. Another panelist, Auschwitz survivor Gena Turgel, said his remarks smacked of anti-Semitism.

=== Series Two ===
==== "Freemasonry: Beyond the Law?" ====
At the start of the second series The Independent reported ("Masons pull out of TV debate with policeman") that "Chief Inspector Brian Woollard, the Metropolitan Police officer at the centre of the Freemasonry controversy, will go on national television tonight to state his case." Woollard "completed 33 years in the force, earned seven commendations, and was responsible for tracking down the Angry Brigade." The Listener magazine described the programme:

After Dark turned its attention, with some daring, to the issue of Masonic influence in the police force. Daring because a truly unfettered programme – live, under virtually no constraints of length – it chose to deal with matters both potentially libellous and believed by some to be bound by sub judice limitations. The central figure was a police officer who alleges he was suspended because his investigations into fraud came up against corrupt Masonic loyalties ... There were two ex-Masons, a clergyman who abandoned the brotherhood on religious grounds and a solicitor, Sir David Napley, who had briefly flirted with it in the old days ... Former Deputy Metropolitan police commissioner Sir Colin Woods spoke unofficially for the police. A journalist, Martin Short, gave a run-down of the history of the Masonic movement and T. Dan Smith told how in jail he got the Masonic knuckle squeeze from both wardens and prisoners ... many an insight into the kind of society we inhabit, its anxieties and preoccupations.

==== Shere Hite and "Marriage" ====
Mark Lawson wrote in The Independent:

... where else would James Dearden, screenwriter of Fatal Attraction, be required to sit while sexpert Shere Hite gave the ending of the film away and demolished his characterisation? In a discussion of what women really wanted, Dearden and Ms Hite were joined by Mary Whitehouse, Naim Attallah and proponents of career motherhood, lesbianism and open marriage ... the advantage of the length is the opportunity to see positions crumbling and being constructed. We began with a rough consensus and Mary Whitehouse designated the runt of the discussion. People sighed and shifted their eyes when she spoke. A couple of hours on, we had the unlikely alliance of Dearden and Whitehouse against Hite.

The Evening Standard described this as "totally compelling viewing":

It is not simply what is said that is important. Equally fascinating are small gestures and expressions, beautifully caught at significant moments by some astute camerawork; the group's physical and verbal interaction with each other; and above all, the ways in which we are able to see how and why an individual might have arrived at his/her set of ideas and beliefs.

==== William "Spider" Wilson ====
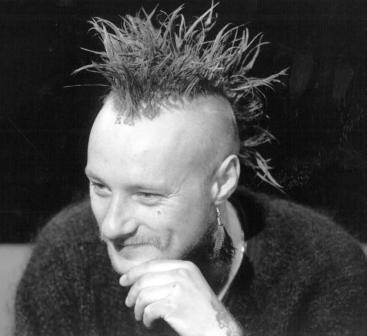
"Spider" Wilson appearing on the same programme

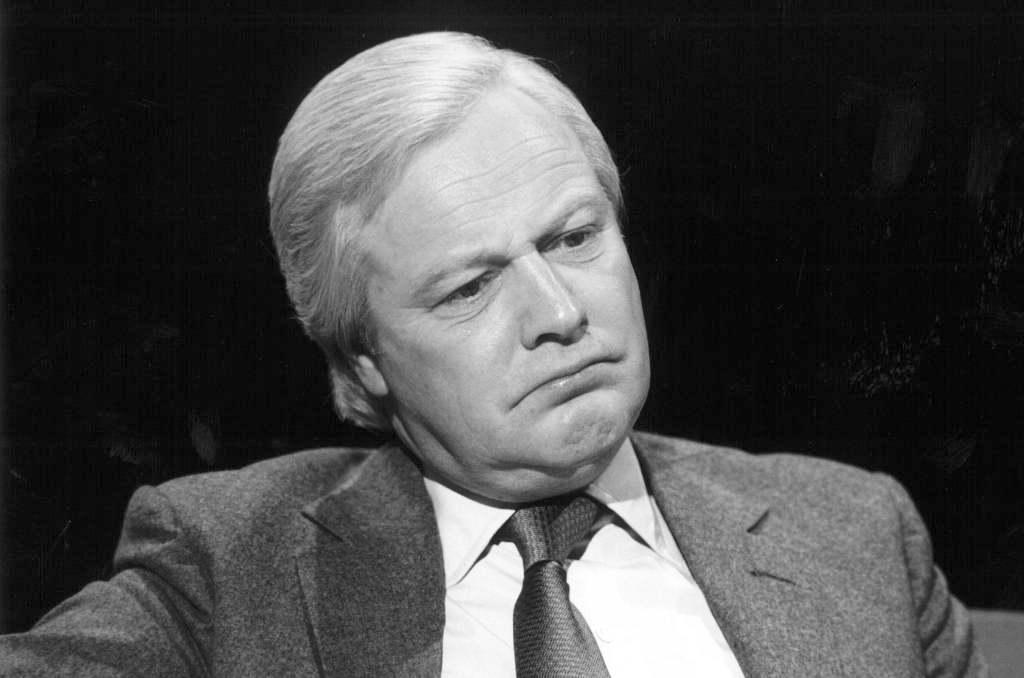
John Heddle appearing on After Dark "No Place Like Home" in 1988

The Sunday Times said the programme on 4 March 1988 "certainly remains lodged in many minds. Spider ... was 'discovered' by a programme researcher ferreting out characters at London's cardboard city. Spider duly came into the Channel 4 studios, cobweb tattooed on his forehead, to talk about drug addiction, being gay and living rough. (Host) Helena Kennedy recalls that homeless Spider, sitting on the plump sofas in the mock studio living room with fellow guests, did not take kindly to being lectured about fecklessness by John Heddle, a Tory MP". She described the confrontation:

"Spider" Wilson's argument with John Heddle, who at that time was chairman of the Tory backbench housing committee, was a perfect example of what could happen. Heddle's tactic was to lecture the feckless Spider, and tell him to pull up his socks. The argument actually felt quite menacing. Ironically, Heddle later committed suicide, while Spider went into rehab, sobered up and now has both a home and a job.

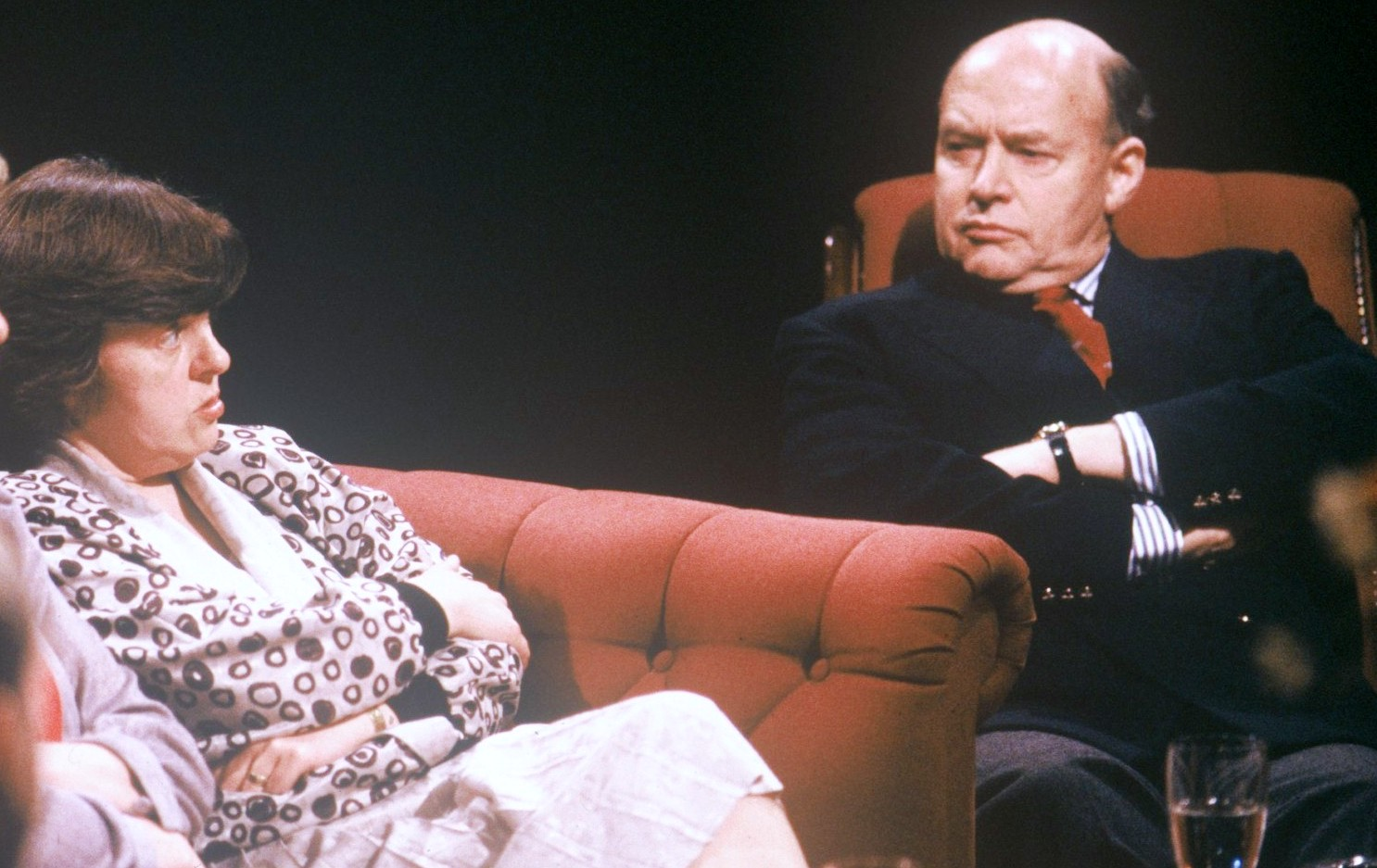
Bernadette McAliskey and Anthony Farrar-Hockley

==== Bernadette McAliskey and "Licensed to Kill?" ====
The Financial Times wrote of the programme on 18 March 1988:

Bernadette McAliskey (formerly Devlin) was allowed to talk throughout as though the British Army were waging war against 'her' people. Those who remember the Army going in to protect 'her' people in 1968 will find this odd.

Another guest, General Sir Anthony Farrar-Hockley suggested to Ms McAliskey that she owed her life to the skill of paratroop surgeons who cared for her after loyalist paramilitaries tried to kill her.

==== "Horse Racing" ====
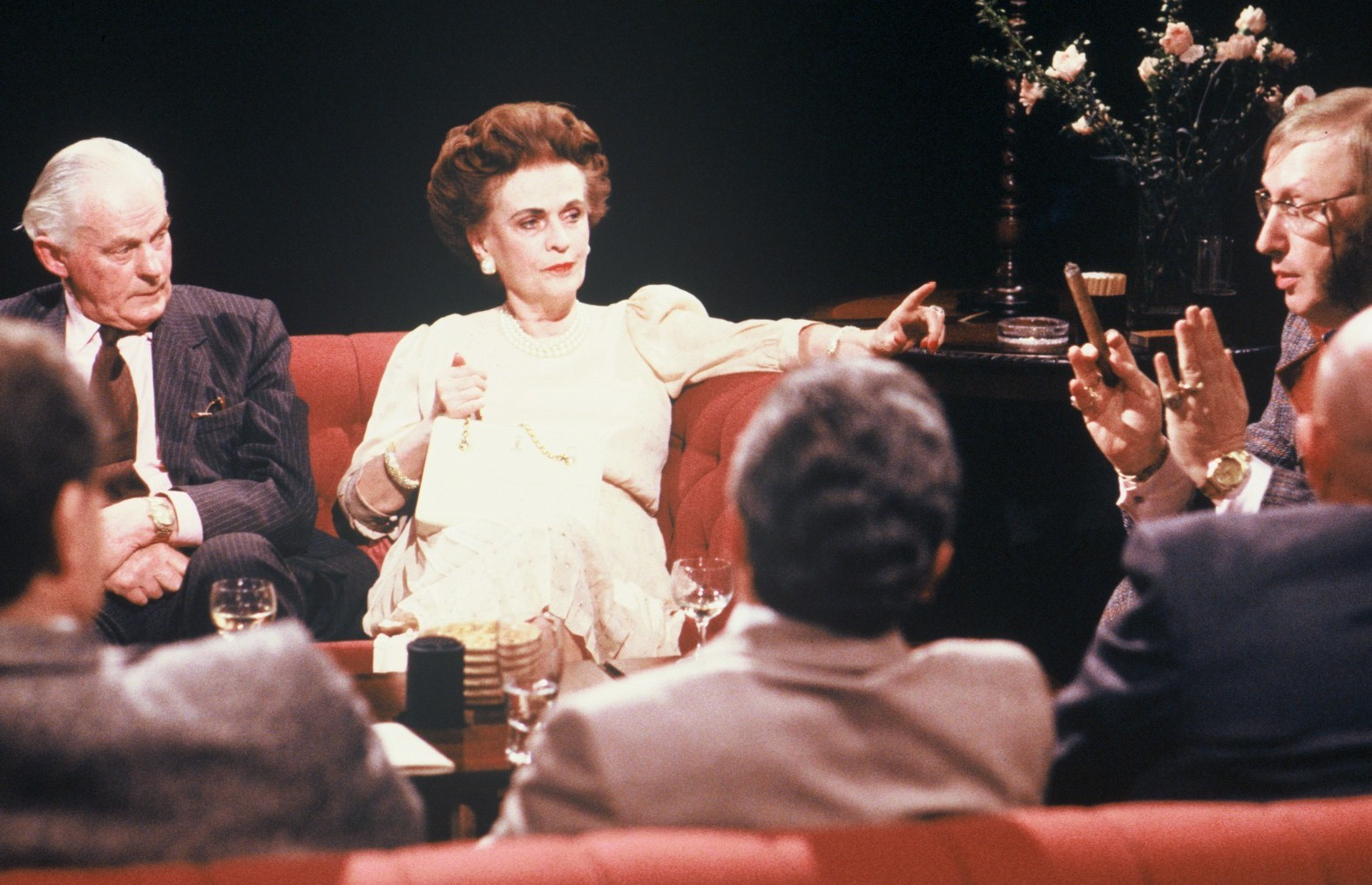
Margaret, Duchess of Argyll, and others

The Racing Post described the programme broadcast on the evening after the 1988 Grand National:

[Jockey Frankie] Dettori recalls: "Many years ago, when I was 17 or 18, there was a programme on Channel 4 at about midnight called After Dark, a discussion show for people who couldn't sleep! I came in from a night out and there was McCririck and a couple of others sitting there on the TV talking a load of rubbish. But there was this guy, sitting there quietly, who would chip in every now and again and say something which was quite outstanding. That was Barney Curley and I was drawn to him like a magnet.

Among the other guests was the Duchess of Argyll, appearing "so she said, to put the point of view of the horse", who later walked out of the programme "because she was so very sleepy".

==== "Bewitched, Bothered or Bewildered?" ====
On 30 April 1988 Tony Wilson hosted "a special Walpurgis Night edition ... which featured representatives of several pagan, occult and Satanist groups. The general tone of the questioning was inquiring and non-judgmental, and the only hostility was expressed by the "token" Christian spokeswoman, ex-witch Audrey Harper. Before the mid-1980s, it would have appeared ludicrous to discuss British Satanists as a serious phenomenon, still less a social problem."

==== "Derry '68" ====
Socialist Worker wrote "A recent discussion on the Irish civil rights struggle in 1968 provided one of the best nights' viewing in ages. Eamonn McCann dominated the whole discussion, destroying anyone who dared to cross him." The television reviewer of the New Statesman wrote that "The After Dark discussion, "Derry 68: Look Back in Anger?", was simply the most enlightening programme on Northern Ireland I have ever seen." In 2021 this programme was shown again during the Docs Ireland international documentary festival run by the Belfast Film Festival.

==== "Israel: 40 Years On" ====
On 14 May 1988, The Daily Telegraph wrote:

Tonight's edition of After Dark ... will mark the 40th anniversary of Israel. The programme is likely to cause controversy, as the Shadow Foreign Secretary Gerald Kaufman and a number of Israelis will appear alongside Faisal Aweidah, the hardline PLO representative in London. For Kaufman, the appearance will not be without a political risk, mainly of a backlash from British Jews who are unlikely to be happy about him appearing alongside Aweidah, a supporter of Yasser Arafat. However for the Israelis involved in the programme there are even greater dangers. They will brave the wrath of the government of their country - where it is illegal for citizens to share a platform with the PLO. One participant ... has already backed out after being told she would face arrest when returning home after the broadcast.

==== "What is Sex For?" ====
A week later "during a discussion about sex, the programme introduced Anthony Burgess to Andrea Dworkin, in the observant presence of a third writer, transgender rights activist Roz Kaveney".

==== "Winston Churchill" ====
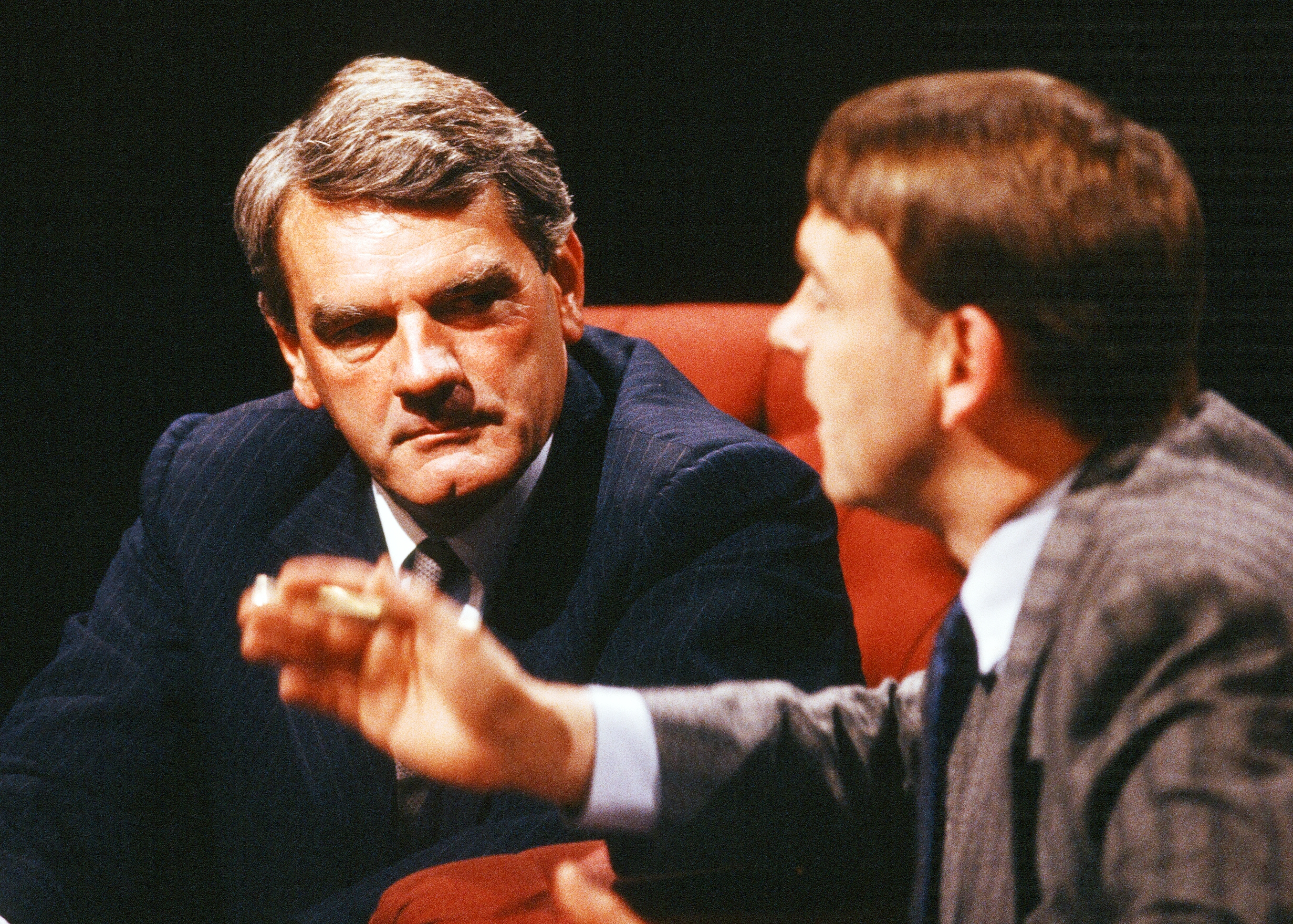
David Irving on After Dark

The Socialist Worker described the 28 May 1988 edition of "my favourite chat show":

"Winston Churchill: Hero or Madman?" ... Unfortunately the character arguing this was none other than the "historian" David Irving ... Here sat a man who was pro-Hitler, who was insulting the legendary Churchill. Facing him was a guy ... who had been Churchill's private secretary for ten or so years. And there was Lord Hailsham, who as Quintin Hogg had been a Tory MP at the time. But it was not Irving they reserved their contempt and anger for. Occasionally they got a bit annoyed by him, but it was the left representative they despised ... dear old respectable Jack Jones, former leader of the transport workers' union.

As the Radio Times wrote later: "The most explosive argument was between Lord Hailsham and veteran trade unionist Jack Jones. There was ... 50 years of hate between them."

==== Harvey Proctor and "Open to Exposure?" ====
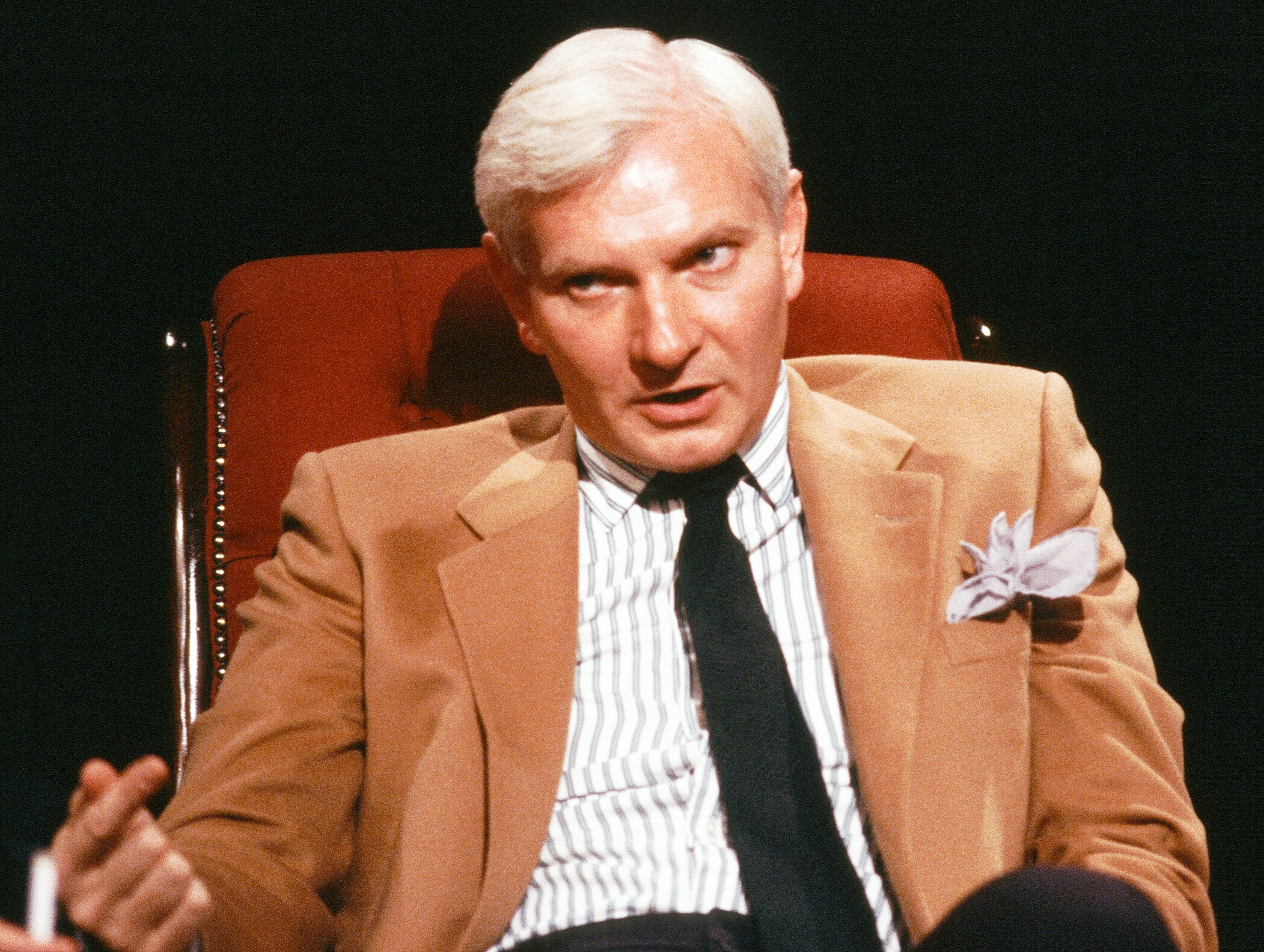
Harvey Proctor on After Dark in 1988

Milton Shulman in The Listener magazine wrote about the edition broadcast on 4 June 1988:

I never plan to watch After Dark and usually am surprised to see that it is on when I return from some social occasion on Saturday night and switch on the box at one o'clock ... My own favourite evening was involved with the subject of ethics and journalism. At first Harvey Proctor was the main focus of our concern as he claimed he was hounded out of public life, not because of his sexual predilections but because of his right-wing political views. But his complaints, as well as Christine Keeler's grievance ... about her treatment during the Profumo affair, soon faded into insignificance compared to the weird admissions of the journalists about what they got up to to get a story. Nina Myskow admitted she had jumped into bed with a hunk of masculine beefcake after she had seen him in a male beauty contest she had been judging. Annette Witheridge of the News of the World told how she had sent a rent boy, wired for sound, around to the home of the late Russell Harty.

And the Evening Standard described "riveting television":

Harvey Proctor – the Spanking MP of tabloid legend, now resigned from his Billericay constituency and running a shirt shop in Richmond – in debate round a studio table with a cross-section of his tormentors ... Proctor turned on (reporter Annette Witheridge). He drew from his pocket a story she'd written, headlined "Spank Row MP Urged to Take AIDS Test", linking him allegedly to "a former male lover believed to have the killer disease AIDS". Had she checked this out? Had she attempted to contact the 'former male lover'? No ... Annette Witheridge's admission that she'd left this story to others to check out, hadn't discovered for four months that it was false, and hadn't apologised because nobody had asked her to, marked a turning point in the debate.

Proctor himself reported in his 2016 memoir that:

It was the antithesis of today's sound bite culture ... It took the format of an after-dinner conversation among friends, around a table with drinks, only we were no friends ... The programme ... [was] one of the most watched and most video requested: apparently one such request came from Buckingham Palace...and as a result of the programme I managed to get further investors (for a shirt shop).

==== Harry Belafonte, Denis Worrall and "South Africa" ====
In 1998, after the Nelson Mandela concert the previous summer, (After Dark) ran a discussion programme including Harry Belafonte, Breyten Breytenbach, Denis Worrall and Ismail Ayob (Mandela's lawyer)." The Guardian described this as "the most civilised and stimulating of current TV programmes" (pictured here with a complete list of guests here) and later Victoria Brittain described the "extraordinary experience of debating with Worrall":

Every letter I received from viewers focussed on how the programme had changed their perception of him ... Harry Belafonte said how much he looked forward to meeting him because of his image in the US as "an enlightened voice" ... After Dark was probably the first television programme accurately to reflect the real balance of forces on the South African political scene ... The significance of the programme ... was how it shifted the debate from the white political agenda followed so assiduously by South Africa-based correspondents, and gave due weight to the real opponents of the regime.

A year later it became public that there was "a revealing off-camera incident between Harry Belafonte and South Africa's ex-ambassador Denis Worrall. For the first three hours of the programme Worrall played Mr Nice Guy but in the closing 30 minutes the diplomatic layers peeled off. The noble Belafonte shook his head regretfully as Worrall's tone changed and he said he would pray for Worrall. Trying to regain lost ground after the programme, Worrall went up to Belafonte and, according to the production team, said: 'Well, Mr Belafonte, you're really quite intelligent, aren't you?'"

==== Patricia Highsmith ====
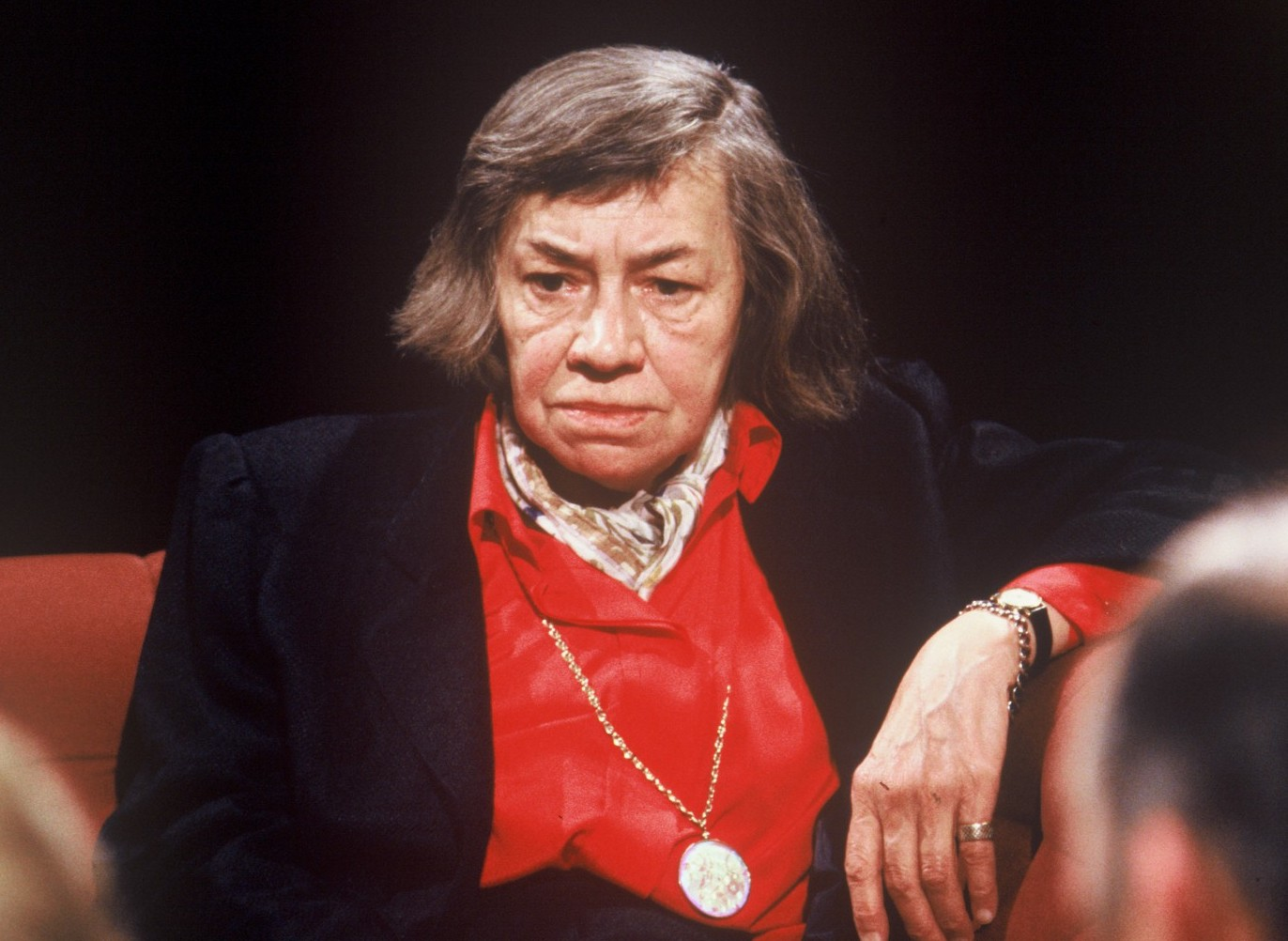
Patrica Highsmith on After Dark in June 1988

Following the programme broadcast on 18 June 1988 The Guardian wrote:

After Dark, a three-hour discussion on subjects which will not always bear the light of day, was about ... murder. There was Patricia Highsmith, the thriller writer, inquisitive as a monkey, Georgina Lawton, Ruth Ellis's daughter ... Lord Longford ... the Rev James Nelson ... [and] David Howden, the father of a girl who was murdered in her bedroom two years ago ... "I don't know if you can imagine the scene of my daughter's bedroom. Friends and neighbours had to go and clean that bedroom up. The stains and fingerprints. They had to take the carpet up, sandpaper the floor and get rid of the marks, buy a new carpet and put it down". "What kind of marks?" asked Patricia Highsmith, who will be slaughtered herself some day.

The Today newspaper wrote:

There have been some very peculiar people on After Dark ... There was the skinhead who left mid-show to look for fresh supplies of lager. And two weeks ago journalist Peter Hillmore sweated so much I thought I would have to throw him a rubber ring. But for sheer oddness, none has outmatched crime writer-cum-New York bag lady lookalike Patricia Highsmith ... asking a series of staggeringly daft and insensitive questions to poor David Howden, whose daughter was strangled by a maniac as she slept.

Andrew Wilson, in his biography of Highsmith, expanded:

Sitting next to Howden, Highsmith questioned the bereaved father in a near-clinical fashion. What kind of man was the murderer? Had he been watching the daughter? Was robbery part of the motive? Had she been raped?

==== Bill Margold and "Pornography" ====
The Evening Standard reviewed the 25 June 1988 discussion:

In the business, they call him Poppa Bear (or is it Bare?) ... Bill Margold, a large American with the vocabulary of a peanut, and one of the guests appearing on this week's After Dark. The subject was pornography and a well balanced mixture of perversion, puritanism and prurience combined to entertain and enlighten insomniacs.

The Guardian added:

Margold's breezy definition of hard core – "up, in, out, off" – belies his ambition to give the public genuine artistic storylines ... I was waiting for someone, preferably a woman, to hang one on big, burly Poppa Bear, who is about the most arrogant, bullying, bulldozer loudmouth this sleep-cheating series has so far brought us."

The background to the programme is detailed in an article by one of the guests, author David Hebditch, available here. All editions of After Dark ended with music, more or less related to the subject of the week. That week, the Evening Standard noted: "This intelligent (mostly), thought-provoking discussion was brought to an end by the song It's Illegal, It's Immoral, or It Makes You Fat."

==== "British Intelligence" ====
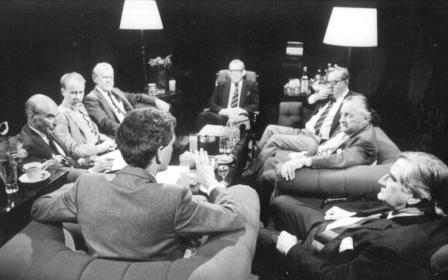
After Dark on 16 July 1988: "British Intelligence"

In a discussion titled "British Intelligence", broadcast on 16 July 1988, the guests included Merlyn Rees, H. Montgomery Hyde and a man called Robert Harbinson, described by Francis Wheen in The Independent newspaper as follows:

Robin Bryans, a ... travel writer and sometime music teacher who also goes under the names Robert Harbinson and Christopher Graham. (His opponent) is Kenneth de Courcy ... who likes to be known as the Duc de Grantmesnil ... Though both are Irish by birth, both have intelligence connections (Bryans was a friend of Blunt), both are ex- jailbirds and both are – how shall we say? – quite eccentric ... [Bryans] denounced de Courcy on the Channel 4 programme After Dark. His allegations are too confused (and too libellous) to be summarised here, but names such as Mountbatten, Shackleton, Churchill, Blunt seem to pop up often.

Bryans himself wrote:

Before the cameras, we delighted to talk about Adeline de la Feld's family upsetting Mussolini with their writings. I was then asked by Robin Ramsay of the Lobster magazine about my own early writing which he knew about from his co-editor Stephen Dorril who had interviewed me for his book Honeytrap, the sad story of my friend Stephen Ward hounded by the Establishment to suicide in 1963. But the Channel Four masterminds wanted to know about my war activities and the following day Montgomery Hyde, a barrister, phoned me to warn me that a High Court writ was on its way.

The journalist Paul Foot described it as "one magnificent edition of After Dark in which Robin Ramsay excelled himself." During the discussion, another guest, retired GCHQ employee Jock Kane, claimed "that the new procedures recommended by the Security Commission regarding the removal of documents from GCHQ had not been implemented four years later."

The following week The Guardian newspaper reported:

Thirty Labour MPs yesterday called for a judicial inquiry into claims that the Government has used private security companies to carry out undercover operations on its behalf. A motion, drawn up by Mr Ken Livingstone (Brent E), refers to statements made by Mr Gary Murray – a private investigator, who says he has been employed by the Government – on Channel 4's After Dark programme.

==== "Save the Whale, Save the World?" ====
On 30 July 1988 "After Dark" turned its attention to the whale. One guest, Shigeko Misaki of the Institute of Cetacean Research, subsequently wrote:

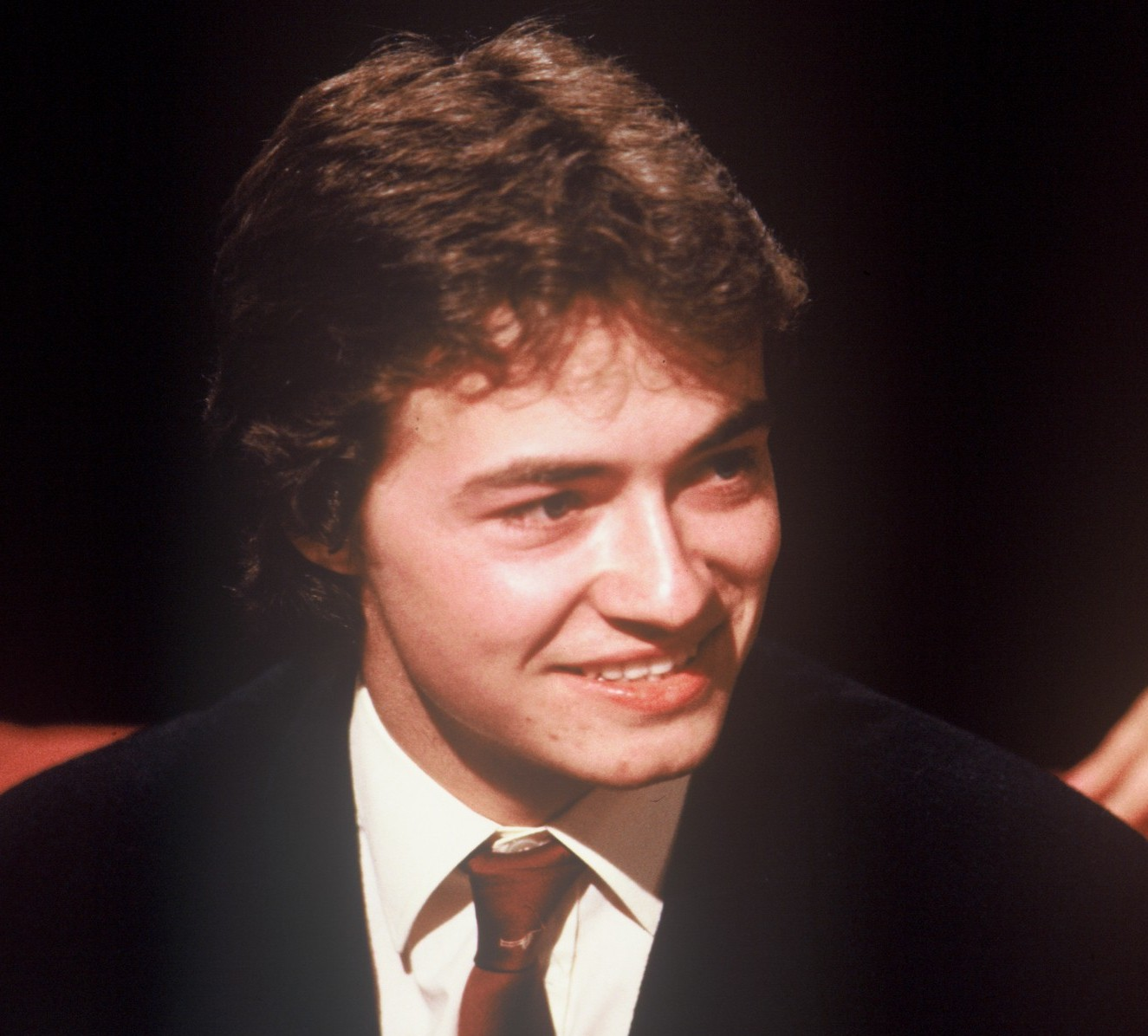
Kieran Mulvaney on "Save the Whale, Save the World?"

It might have been the British sense of fair play that required the Japanese views for balance, they asked Mr. C. W. Nicol, the author of "Harpoon," to appear on the show to speak for the Japanese position. Responding to Mr. Nicol's call, I flew to London to appear on the show with him. Several distinguished persons appeared on the program, including Dr. Jim Lovelock, who coined the name Gaia for global environmental crisis; Heathcote Williams, poet and author of "The Whale Nation" enormously popular with young generation of the U.K.; Petra Kelly, then a German parliamentarian of the Green Party; Kieran Mulvaney, then a 17-year-old energetic anti-whaling activist (who later became the spokesman for Greenpeace); and Tony Ball who represented the British motor industry. During the course of the program, I happened to remark on the traditional use of whale baleen plates that is an important part of the respect paid to all parts of the whales caught, using them without waste. I explained that the whale baleen has been used inside the extremely delicate mechanism for the movements of puppets' heads in the traditional Japanese theatrical art called 'bunraku.' To this, poet Williams responded: "Using a whale product for a puppet show which Japanese call 'culture.' It's unforgivable. Japanese should use plastic." "Bunraku," one of the three most treasured traditional theatrical arts of Japan ... apparently meant nothing to one whose life is dedicated to arts of the West.

==== Bianca Jagger and "Nicaragua" ====
John Underwood wrote of the programme broadcast on 6 August 1988: "I recall hosting an edition of ... After Dark in which (Bianca Jagger) intellectually crushed Dr John Silber, a senior adviser to Ronald Reagan, and Roberto Ferrey, an apologist for the Contras. Furthermore, she left Sir Alfred Sherman lost for words, a feat rarely achieved before or since."

==== Jonathan Miller and "Alternative Medicine" ====
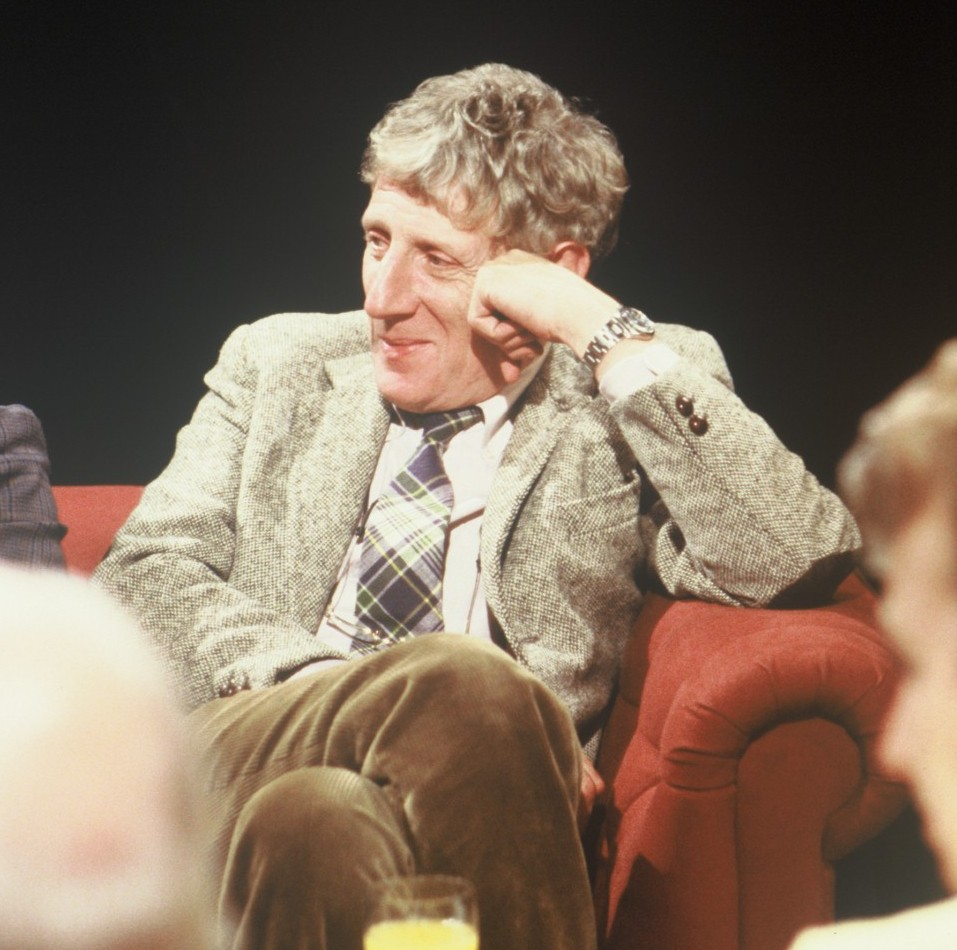
Jonathan Miller on After Dark

In the New Statesman the writer Sean French described "the best moment of my week" occurring at the end of the 3 September 1988 edition:

After Dark had been debating the problems of alternative medicine. After a few hours of acrimonious debate, each of the participants was asked to say a few words on what they hoped for the future of medicine. The last comment of all was made by Dr Jonathan Miller. Since he had been the evening's most vociferous opponent of fringe medicine I expected him to deliver a final diatribe. Instead of this, he said he wanted to speak of something which was more important than any kind of medicine delivered on a one-to-one basis:

The main welfare which was ever conferred on the human community was actually by social administration. They were the improvement of drainage, the rationalisation of diet and a humane society, administered by a just and equitable government which actually sees human welfare as being something which has to be honoured according to principles of distributive justice.

Therefore, he concluded, he thought the most pressing need was 'the ousting of this appalling government'.

==== Gerry Adams ====
The following week Channel 4 dropped plans to invite the Sinn Féin president Gerry Adams "to appear on its late night talk show After Dark, after protests from other contributors. The Independent Broadcasting Authority said then that it would have banned Mr Adams on the grounds that his views were offensive to public feeling. Channel 4 avoided a dispute with the IBA by dropping the programme, saying it had only wanted Mr Adams to appear if a suitable context could be found and that, at such short notice, it had been impossible to achieve that."

The Guardian wrote:

On Thursday 8 September, Channel 4 took a decision which has serious implications for freedom of speech on British television ... The arguments used – including what appears to be an unprecedented threat to use the 1981 Broadcasting Act – and the way the decision was taken, were as significant as the decision itself. The invitation to Adams was made public ... by Paul Wilkinson, professor of international relations at Aberdeen University and chairman of the Research Foundation for the Study of Terrorism. The programme makers asked him for advice and contacts – they did not invite him to appear. Wilkinson publicly attacked the proposal to have Adams on the programme. Tory MPs, including Neil Hamilton, Mrs Thatcher's parliamentary private secretary, and Tony Marlow, joined what was likely to lead to a chorus of protest. C4 was under pressure to react. Initially, it said that Adams would only appear if a "suitable context" could be found. A second statement, announcing the decision that the programme had been abandoned, said that it was impossible, at such short notice, to achieve that "satisfactory context" ... C4 thereby successfully avoided a dispute with the IBA ... [which] announced later that day that, if necessary, it would have used Section 4 of the Broadcasting Act to stop Adams appearing ... After Dark in the past has included Roberto Ferrey, a member of the Contras seven-man directorate, Klaus Barbie's defence counsel, and a man who admitted having molested 200 schoolchildren ... The decision to drop the programme was taken as the programme makers – who often do not finalise the show until Friday midday – were trying to get a Tory spokesman from the mainland ... Ian Gow, who left the government over its Irish policy, initially said he had no objection in principle to appearing, but then changed his mind.

The Daily Telegraph wrote:

A spokesman for the IBA said: "... The fact that it is a live programme also means that there is no editorial control over remarks Mr Adams may make." The issue comes a month after an appeal from the Prime Minister to the British media ... to withhold publicity from IRA sympathisers.

Channel 4's former Chief Executive, Jeremy Isaacs, speaking at a public lecture that month, said he would have given the After Dark air-time to Adams: "Although I sympathise with what must have been a difficult decision, broadcasters are always going to be accused of self-censorship. Yasser Arafat was allowed on Channel 4 because he happened to represent a lot of people but I knew this would lead to criticism because he is one of many who believe it is right to use any means of obtaining power". The row was later placed in context by the academic study The Media and Northern Ireland:

There were a few straws in the wind in the autumn of 1988 which, with hindsight, suggested what was on the way. In September Channel Four pulled an After Dark programme which was to feature Gerry Adams ... Most journalists though saw this as an isolated case of self-censorship brought on by the post-Ballygawley atmosphere.

An alternative view is provided by Laura K. Donohue (writing in the Cardozo Law Review), who summarises Professor Keith Ewing and Conor Gearty as follows:

... at the urging of the British Government, Channel 4 eliminated one of the After Dark programs, in which Gerry Adams was scheduled to appear.

Following a debate in the House of Commons Liz Forgan of Channel 4 challenged this account in a letter to The Times:

After Dark considered inviting Gerry Adams on to the programme, not simply for him to express his views but to hold him to account for his apology for vile acts of terrorism against the vigorous challenge of five other participants. Michael Mates cites this as an example of the media failing to put its house in order. He omits to mention that in fact the invitation was never issued and programme was never made or transmitted because I ... decided that we could not gather enough other participants on that date of sufficient authority to ensure that the programme did not turn into a free run for Mr Adams and flout the normal standards of due impartiality.

The producer later commented in an article in Lobster magazine:

Adams had apparently agreed to what was at the time quite a coup: he would sit down with sworn political enemies ... Finally the C4 Director of Programmes Liz Forgan and I agreed a deal: if a former British prime minister would come on the programme, Adams could appear. Wilson had Alzheimers; Callaghan never liked us; and Edward Heath, who later appeared twice on After Dark, couldn't make it. So that was the end of it ... I was subsequently told our (unmade) programme was the straw which broke Downing Street's back. I cannot confirm this, but the timing is eloquent: our programme with Adams was to be on 10 September. On 19 October, Douglas Hurd, then Home Secretary, introduced broadcasting restrictions (the "broadcasting ban") on organisations proscribed in Northern Ireland and Britain, including direct statements by members of Sinn Féin. From November 1988 to September 1994, the voices of Irish republican and Loyalist paramilitaries were barred by the government from British television and radio.

=== Series Three ===
==== Tony Benn and "Out of Bounds" ====
The first programme of the third series was titled Out of Bounds: "1988 was the year of the tri-centenary of the Bill of Rights, yet in May 1989, in the shadowy studio of Channel 4's After Dark programme, a group of former British and US intelligence agents discussed the merits and evils of new legislation on official secrets. When this legislation completes its processes through Parliament such a gathering is likely to become illegal."

The Financial Times wrote:

Channel 4's After Dark triumphantly broke all the rules from the beginning ... The first of the new series on Saturday proved that the formula is still working extremely well. The subject was official secrecy, and during the course of the night remarks included: "I was in Egypt at the time, plotting the assassination of Nasser" and "Wilson and Heath were destroyed in part by the action of intelligence agents" and (spoken with incredulity) "You mean we shouldn't have got rid of Allende?" The hostility between just two of the participants, which often brings most life to the programme, occurred this time between Tony Benn and ex-CIA man Miles Copeland, and it was the fundamental difference in political outlook between these two which informed the entire discussion. Anyone who regarded Benn as a dangerous "loony leftie" but watched right through until 2.00 may have been astonished at his thoroughly conservative British attitudes.

Tony Benn wrote in his diary, later published as The End of an Era:

Saturday 13 May – In the evening I went to take part in this live television programme After Dark with John Underwood in the chair. It was an open-ended discussion which started at about midnight and went on till the early hours. The other participants were the historian Lord Dacre, Eddie Chapman, who had been a double agent during the war, Anthony Cavendish, who is a former MI6 and MI5 officer, Miles Copeland (an ex-CIA man), James Rusbridger, who has worked with MI5 at one stage, and Adela Gooch, a defence journalist from The Daily Telegraph. Every one of them made admissions or came out with most helpful information. I was terribly pleased with it.

Asked during the course of the programme if the secret service should be democratically accountable Lord Dacre replied:

I would like to see it accountable indirectly by having the ultimate authority outside party politics, and if there was a body which consisted of respectable people, respected by all sides, then it wouldn't be dependent on the government of the day.

The Listener magazine described the programme:

The new Official Secrets Act has just received the Queen's assent. This may be the last time for some years that any disclosures can be made on such matters ... After Dark exists for mysterious reasons, probably something to do with a necessary safety-valve in a climate of increasing pressure on the media ... Its strength is that it has rescued that endangered species, genuinely spontaneous conversation, and presented it absolutely without frills. It does not have to rely on a presenter or on the glamour of its guests, as other talk shows do. Its force is its unique lack of inhibition in dealing with very controversial issues without exhibitionism ... an invaluable programme.

Richard Norton-Taylor reported on guests who did not appear because of concerns about contempt of court: "Michael Randle and Pat Pottle, who admitted helping the spy, George Blake, escape from prison in 1966 ... have been dropped from the ... programme ... Mr Randle and Mr Pottle were arrested and released on police bail last week after admitting in a book that they had helped Blake escape." Michael Randle eventually appeared on After Dark, fourteen years later, on 22 March 2003.

==== Hillsborough and "Football – The Final Whistle?" ====
On 20 May 1989, following the Hillsborough disaster and on the night after the FA Cup Final, After Dark invited bereaved parents to participate, one of whom said:

... they didn't give the poor people who were killed any dignity ... I bent down to kiss and talk to [my son] and as we stood up there was a policeman who came from behind me ... trying to usher me and my husband out ... I had to scream at the police officer to allow us privacy ... the total attitude was, you've identified number 33 so go!

A lengthy extract from what bereaved mother Eileen Delaney said can be read here.

==== 'Blue' and "Drugs" ====
A week later The Times wrote:

The sexiest show of the week by far is After Dark ... Saturday night's talking point was the demon drug crack, a subject which would normally leave this viewer in a state of lacquered composure. Again, however, one's hackles soon rose and one was up there, punching the air, taking sides. Unfortunately the debate was hijacked by a black musician called 'Blue', who shouted everyone down with non-sequiturs. Eventually he got up and left.

==== Denis Healey and "Back in the USSR?" ====
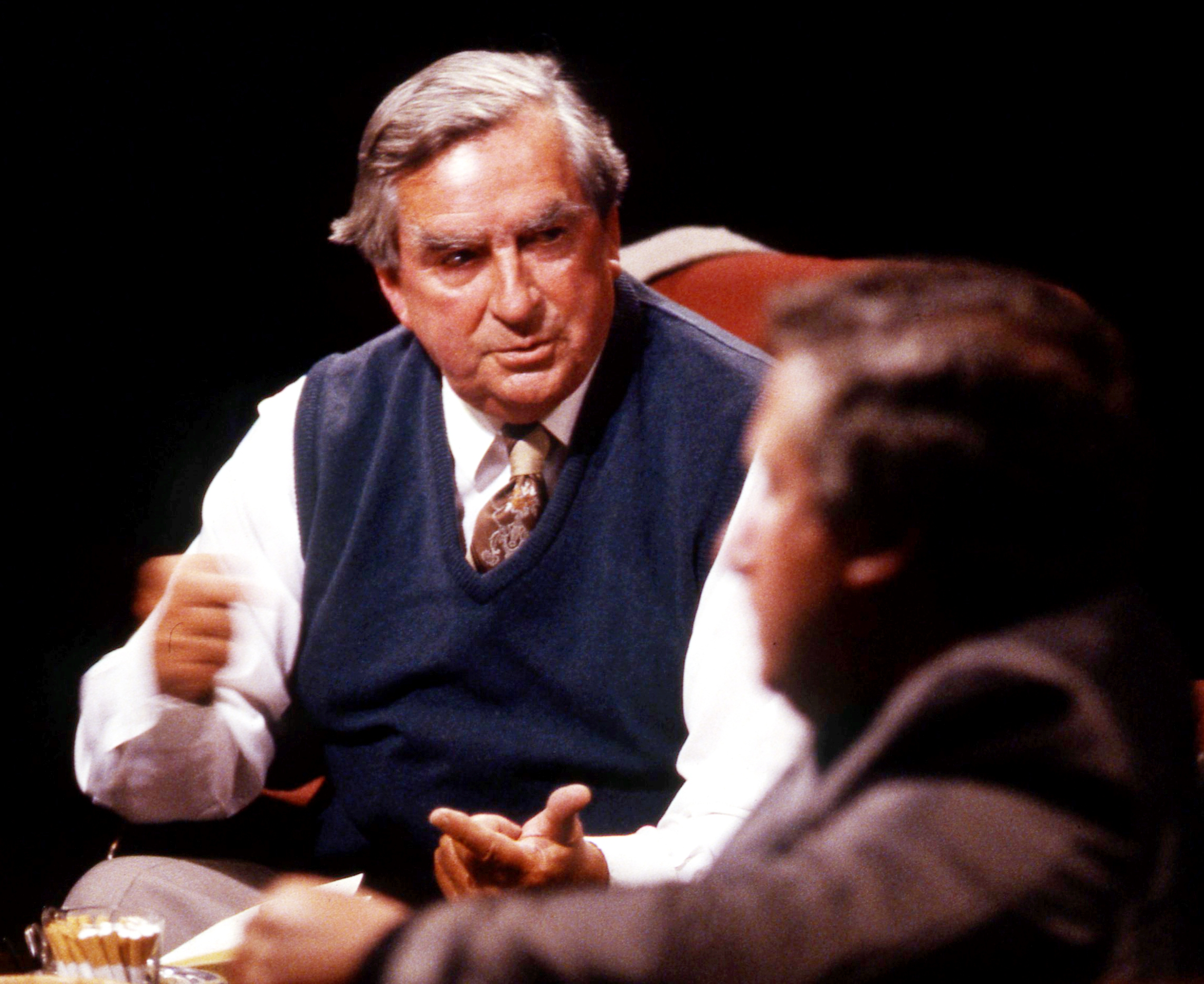
Denis Healey on After Dark

The programme the following week was described by ITN as being "about the changes in Soviet Russia. Former communist (and later British Chancellor) Denis Healey; novelist Tatyana Tolstaya and other Russians including journalist Vitali Vitaliev and dissident Vladimir Bukovsky." The Communist journal Unity later wrote "The last time I saw Bukovsky was on a Channel 4 programme After Dark in which he slaughtered the drinks trolley and got up the nose of the former Labour leader [sic] Denis Healey who seemed to work out pretty early that this bloke was not the best of people."

==== Edward Heath ====
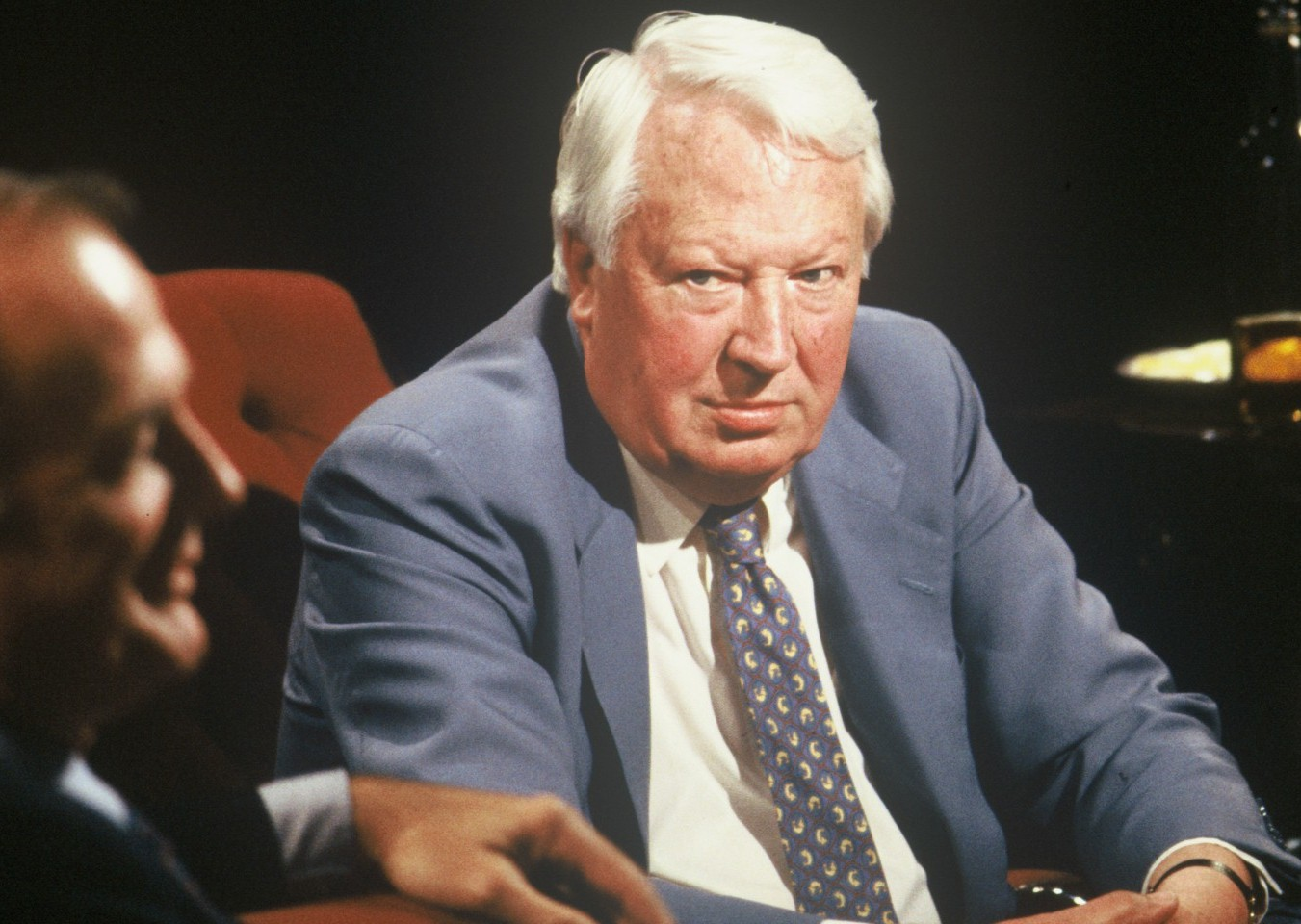
Edward Heath on After Dark

On 10 June 1989 "in the course of a bad-tempered late-night television discussion programme during the European election campaign in June, (former Prime Minister) Edward Heath contemptuously rejected the possibility, posed by the former American Defence Secretary Richard Perle, that the political map of Europe was about to be transformed: 'Does anyone seriously believe that these satellite countries are going to become free democracies and does anyone really believe that Moscow is going to see the disintegration of the Soviet empire?'"

This was the first time a former Prime Minister had appeared on After Dark. Edward Heath was a guest again, on 2 March 1991, discussing the Persian Gulf with Lord Weidenfeld and Adnan Khashoggi.

==== "Pride and Prejudice" ====
On 24 June 1989, in the run up to the 20th anniversary of the Stonewall riots in New York, After Dark asked what progress in terms of gay rights had been made since the 1960s. Guests included the playwright Martin Sherman and the psychiatrist Dr Ismond Rosen. The Wellcome Collection describes the programme in their catalogue:

Each participant, except Rosen, is asked to speak about their relevant personal experiences in the 1960s. The discussion moves on to examine some experiences with psychiatrists and the attitude of psychiatrists treating homosexual or lesbian child or adult patients. Rosen is asked about the strategies he would employ with a person seeing him in connection with their sexual identity ... His job as a psychiatrist is to understand that process, not to deem whether something is normal or not. From here on the discussion develops and during it Rosen is challenged a number of times on his views or asked to explain them in more detail as a professional speaking to lay people. There is a certain amount of hostility from various participants towards Rosen's views.

==== "Germany – 50 Years On" ====
In his book A Thread of Gold the Rabbi Albert Friedlander describes his participation in the After Dark discussion held on the 50th anniversary of the start of the Second World War:

I had a strange and almost traumatic encounter with some Germans of the type I had basically avoided ... I was asked to join Christof Wackernagel, a former Baader-Meinhof actor and poet ... a Herr Spitzi from Austria who was a "revisionist" historian and questioned whether a Holocaust had in fact happened; a camp survivor; a Wall Street Journal writer; a psychiatrist; and Franz Schoenhuber, head of the new Republican party in Germany ... At least three times during the long night I excused myself and marched out of the TV studio, into the street, to breathe fresh air.

==== "Body Beautiful" ====
Later in September 1989, the Evening Standard said "After Dark 'provided us with the best talk, entertainment and drama of the weekend, when a group sat down to discuss the Body Beautiful. On one seat sat Mandy Mudd, representing the London Fat Woman's Group ... Strategically seated next to her on the sofa was the exquisite Suzanne Younger, Miss United Kingdom ... The most impressive guests were Molly Parkin, who asked all the right questions; ex-body builder Zoe Warwick, whose perceptiveness and incisive comments kept opening up new areas of discussion; and Professor Arthur Marwick, who had to bear the brunt of everyone's criticism and abuse ... Ms Mudd and disabled actor Nabil Shaban shouted him down." A columnist in The Times, Barbara Amiel, wrote "A very fat lady and a deformed man (told) a beauty queen that her looks were 'boring'. Any suggestion that she was beautiful, they explained, was simply a reflex of a conditioned and oppressed culture. My outrage at this nonsense was tempered by the inability of the beauty queen to do much more than squeak."

==== "Death Penalty?" ====
A week later, on 7 October 1989, "a hangman (Syd Dernley) declared, in the presence of a judge yearning for the return of the death penalty (Michael Argyle), that if authorised he would happily kill another guest, a former IRA man (Sean O'Dochartaigh)".

==== "The Royal Family" ====
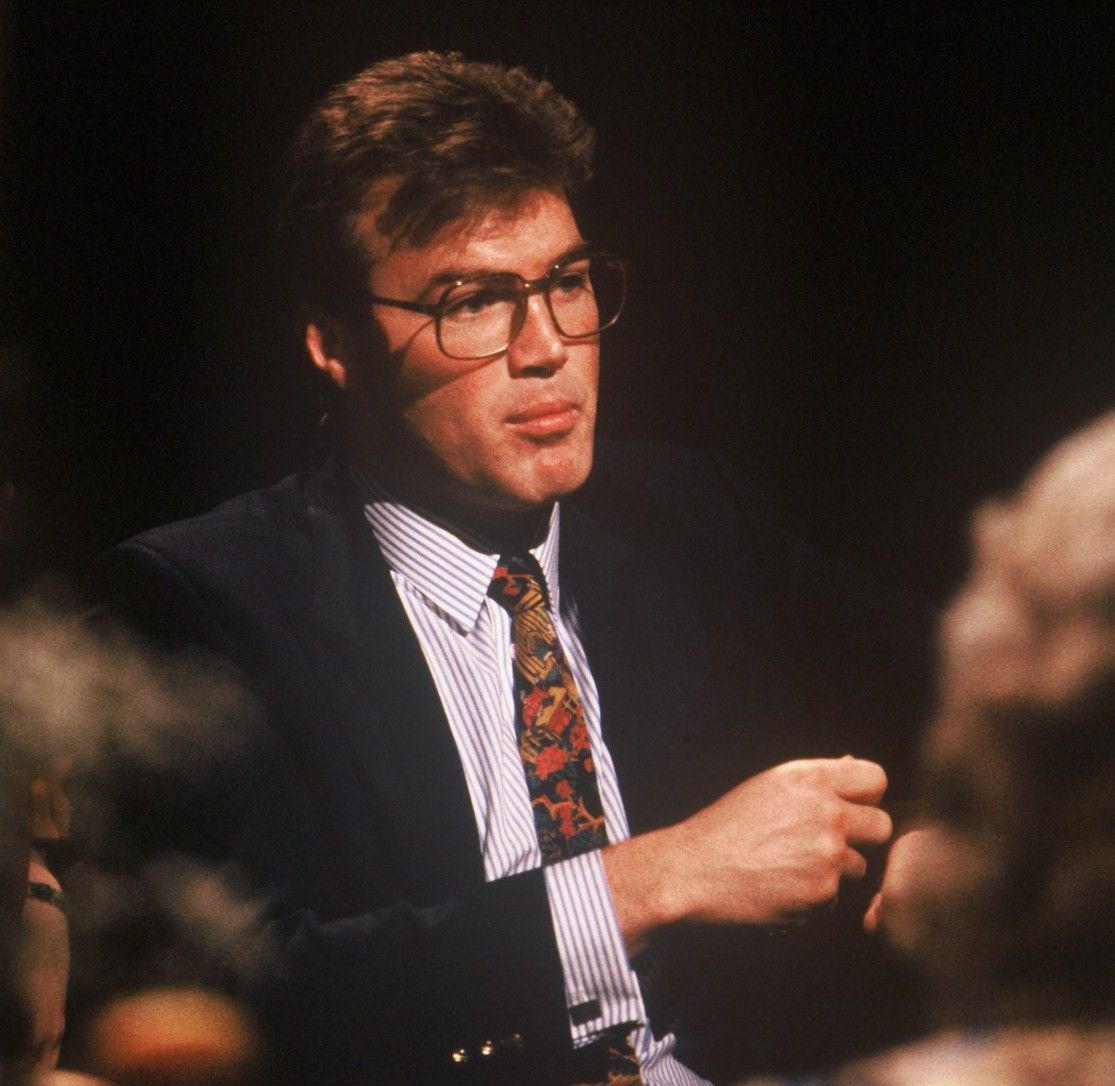
Andrew Morton on After Dark

On 21 October Tony Wilson hosted a discussion about royalty with, among others, Andrew Morton, Peregrine Worsthorne and Archduke Karl von Habsburg. The Irish Independent wrote that Worsthorne "likened meeting the Queen Mother to meeting Einstein".

==== Xaviera Hollander and "Men and Women: What's the Difference?" ====
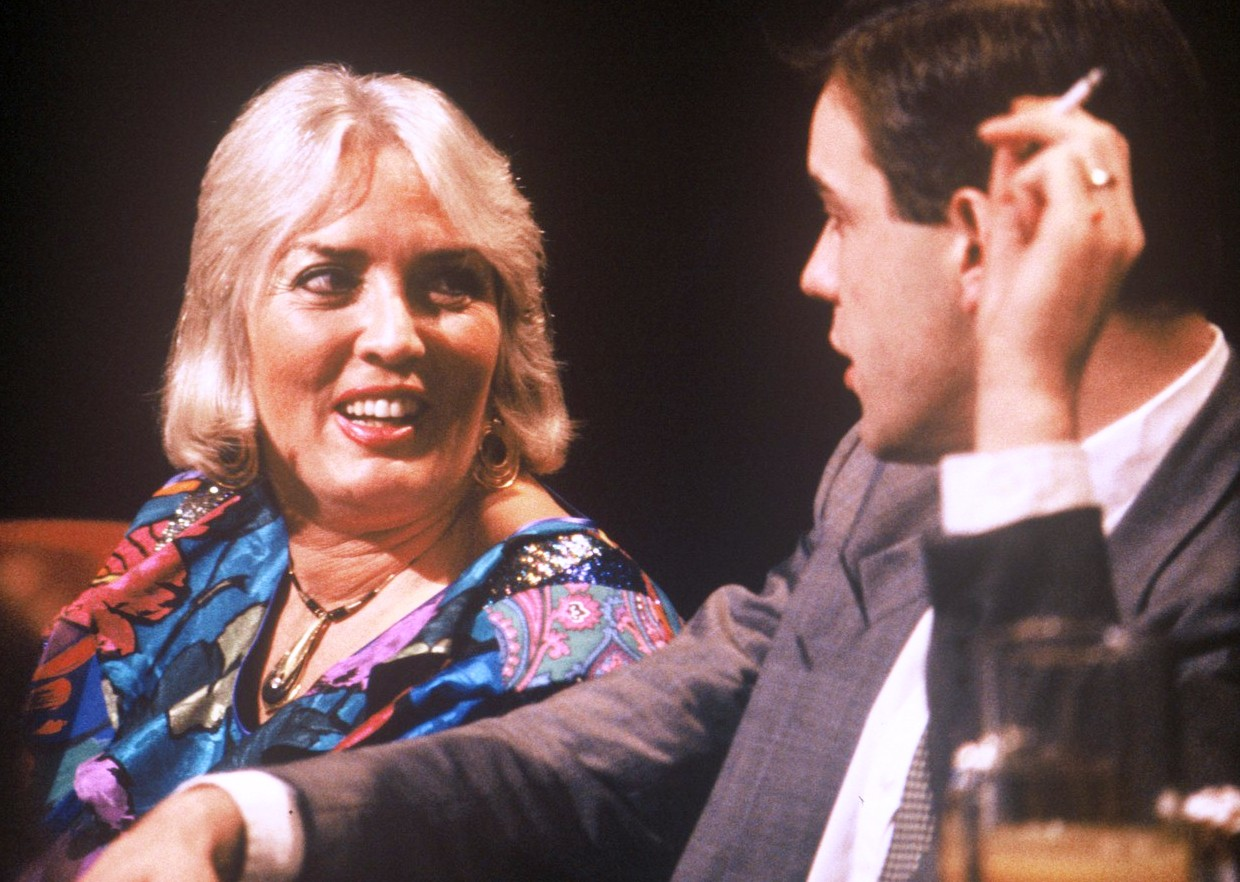
Xaviera Hollander and Malcolm Bennett on After Dark

On 28 October 1989, during a discussion on differences between men and women with among others Mary Stott and Hans Eysenck, one guest, Malcolm Bennett, "successfully propositioned the Happy Hooker author Xaviera Hollander, and the pair walked off the live set to continue their discourse privately."

==== Edwina Currie and "What Makes MPs Run?" ====
A week later, on "the night of 4th November 1989 the politician Edwina Currie appeared, truly live and unconstrained, on After Dark, while at exactly the same time the BBC transmitted her appearance on another programme (Saturday Matters) recorded earlier but as usual announced as "live". After Dark had fun with Currie's apparent bilocation and the clash of realities". The Newcastle Journal reported that "An angry lady called her 'a conceited witch' and hoped she would never set eyes on her again".

=== Series Four ===
==== "Arms and the Gulf" ====
The British Film Institute characterised the opening discussion of the new series in January 1991 as follows:

Discussion on the West's role in supplying arms to the Middle East. The speakers included: Adel Darwish (Egyptian journalist, author of Holy Babylon), Tam Dalyell MP, Bruce Hemmings (ex-CIA), Major-General James Lunt (former commander of Arab Legion), Rana Kabbani (author of "A Letter To Christendom" and daughter of Syrian Ambassador to Washington), Colonel Robert Jarman (ex-Minister of Defence), Joey Martyn-Martin (former arms dealer).

==== "Survival – At What Cost?" ====
The programme the following week was described by ITN as "As the 1991 Gulf War begins, a group of survivors discuss their feelings – with a powerful appearance by Auschwitz survivor Rabbi Hugo Gryn and Sheila Cassidy, tortured by Chileans while General Pinochet was in power" Gryn's daughter wrote: "At first Hugo and another guest, Karma Nabulsi, a representative of the PLO, seemed hostile to one another, but before long they were giggling like old friends".

==== Oliver Reed and Kate Millett: "Do Men Have To Be Violent?" ====
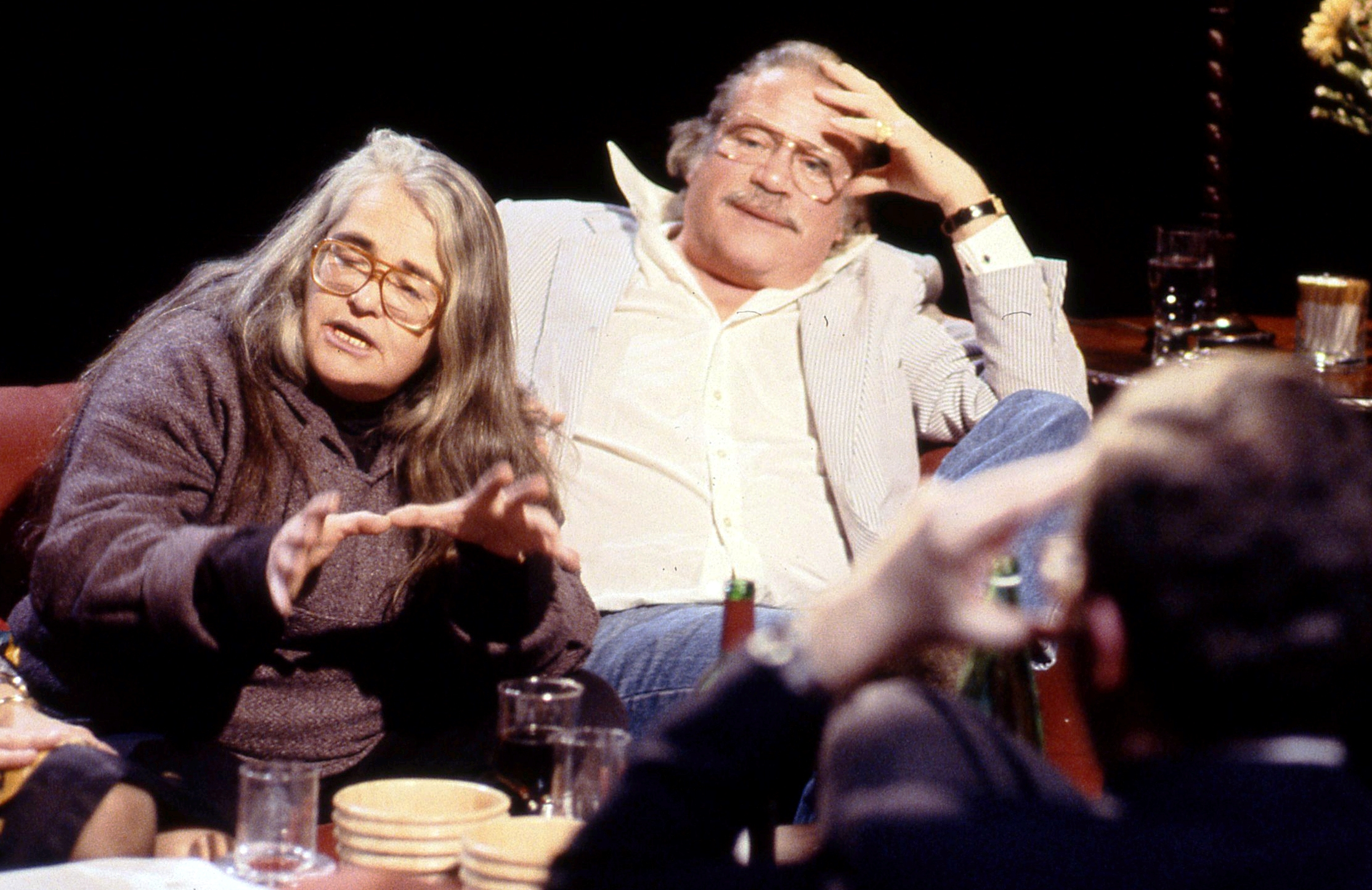
Kate Millett and Oliver Reed on After Dark

At the height of the Gulf War, Oliver Reed appeared on an edition discussing militarism, masculine stereotypes and violence to women, with a stated reason by host Helena Kennedy being that "he had often expressed views about masculinity and what it meant to be a real man." As it so happened, Reed had won a libel case against The Sun days prior to broadcast, which had called him a wife beater. The Daily Telegraph wrote in 2021 that "Reed's contributions to After Dark – and to British television history, thanks to much repeated clips – were indeed valuable: inappropriate comedy gold. Belligerent, disruptive, sloshed on half pints of wine...(Reed) freestyled about the dynamic between men and women". During the broadcast, Reed attempted to kiss the feminist author Kate Millett, and was eventually asked to leave by the rest of the panel. A member of the production team later wrote that Reed "got famously sloshed but perhaps not quite as much as viewers may have thought (or as other guests had been – the drinking record was held by philosopher A. J. Ayer)". Another guest on the programme, author Neil Lyndon, wrote an article in The Independent about the experience.

The show received much attention and, as reported later in The Daily Telegraph, "has become mythologised, largely because of the events around it. In a first for British TV, the show was pulled off the air during its live broadcast. Not because of Oliver Reed's antics ... but because of a hoax call - a mistake that Channel 4 tried to swiftly brush under the wine-splashed carpet". The producer wrote later to the British television trade magazine Broadcast:

The team responsible for After Dark were naturally pleased that Broadcast chose our programme as one of the most significant in Channel 4's history in your anniversary issue. Since you referred to the edition in which the late Oliver Reed took part, this seems a good time to correct some of the myths which have surrounded the programme since it was transmitted on 26 January 1991.

Although Reed was not the only disruptive guest in the history of After Dark, what put this particular show into the headlines was not so much Reed's behaviour as C4's. It took the show off the air for 20 minutes, filling the space with an old documentary about coal mining. When our programme returned, Reed was still on set and still disruptive.

That night Reed's behaviour was certainly causing concern. But neither the production team nor host Helena Kennedy felt the situation was out of control. Kennedy told us the guests could themselves decide whether and when to ask Reed to leave the set.

That night, while the then commissioning editor of After Dark, Michael Atwell, was watching the show, he was phoned by someone representing himself as the "duty officer" of the Independent Broadcasting Authority. This individual said an angry Michael Grade, then Chief Executive of C4, had demanded the programme be stopped. We sought to reassure Atwell, explaining that After Dark often received hoax calls and urged him to check further with his C4 superiors. We could not help reflecting that if Grade were truly upset it would have been more sensible for him to call either the studio or C4, rather than the regulator. However Michael Atwell, without further consultation, decided to stop transmission. We let the guests continue their discussions, though live broadcasting was obviously no longer possible.

But why did live transmission then resume after 20 minutes? Because further enquries by Atwell revealed that Grade was away on his boat. In fact it was Liz Forgan, awoken at home, who said the programme should be put back on air. The curious event of the disappearance of a live programme provided Fleet Street with some funny stories, not all of them true (but many are still recycled). We at Open Media were asked by C4 to issue a joint statement which would have absolved C4 from responsibility. This we refused to do. Six days later Atwell quietly admitted on C4's Right to Reply that After Dark was not implicated in the screw-up.

Viewers with long memories may recall that Reed was asked to leave by the other guests some while after the show resumed transmission. Atwell kept his job at C4 and axed the show at the end of that run.

In his column in the Daily Mirror, Victor Lewis-Smith boasted of his hoax call: "The show was taken off air not by C4, but by ... little-old-wine-drinking-me, sitting at home, far from the TV studio ... Once connected, I shouted: 'Michael Grade is furious about this. Take the bloody programme off ... now!'"

The lawyer Geoffrey Robertson wrote: "The Broadcasting Standards Council condemned the makers of After Dark for not blacking out Oliver Reed's crude and boorish behaviour ... when this behaviour was actually proving the point in a discussion of 'men and violence'".

Channel 4's Deputy Programme Director, John Willis, wrote an internal memo: "Oliver Reed got drunk and a hoaxer caused the programme briefly to be taken off air. I view the latter with a great deal more seriousness than the former ... 1,000 calls from an audience estimated at just 300,000. Remarkable."

==== Gordon Winter and Peter Hain ====
A week later the programme discussed "The Cost of a Free Press" with, among others, Duncan Campbell, Anthony Howard and Lord Lambton. In the course of the programme, Gordon Winter said "I was a chief witness against Peter Hain, and then BOSS ordered me to do a maverick witness to get him off in order to beat up Jeremy Thorpe. Peter Hain – of course he was set up by the South Africans – of course he was." Peter Hain had himself appeared on the very first After Dark programme several years earlier (see here).

==== Prisons: No Way Out ====
On 29 February 1991, a discussion about prison reform featured a "rare live appearance by socialite writer Taki Theodoracopolous, who (admitted) he deserved his prison sentence for cocaine possession. Another striking guest (was) Tony Lambrianou, who served 15 years for his part in the murder of Jack The Hat McVitie."

The Sunday Times wrote "Taki was reluctant to appear ... nervous about what consorting with criminals would do to his image. Funny really, when the only person he hit it off with on the show was the long-term criminal Tony Lambrianou".

==== The Gulf ====
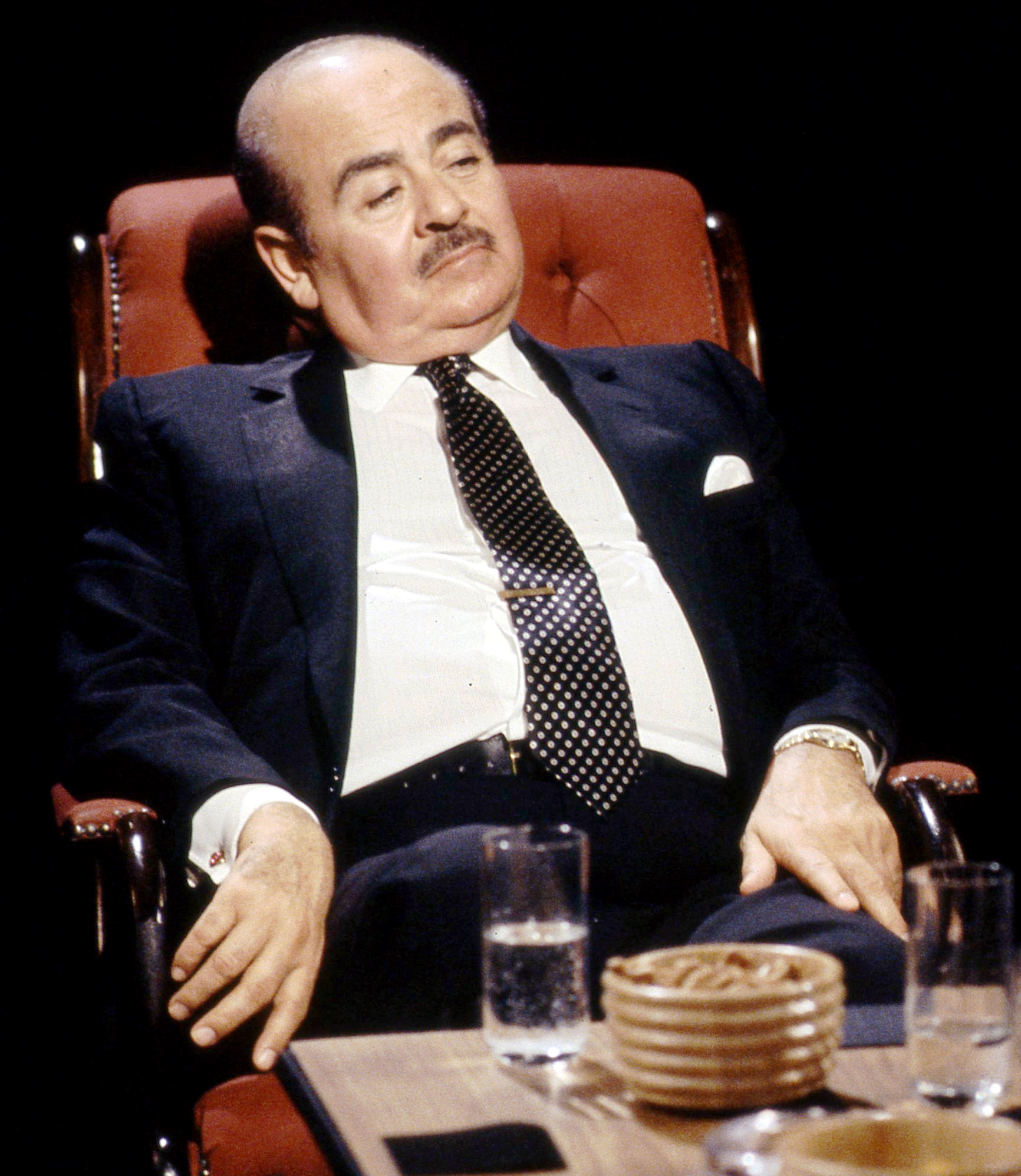
Adnan Khashoggi on After Dark

The discussion on 2 March 1991 featured the only live TV appearance by Adnan Khashoggi, together with a confrontation between Lord Weidenfeld and David Mellor's friend Mona Bauwens (daughter of a senior PLO figure). Also on the programme Chris Cowley, implicated in the Iraqi supergun affair and former Conservative Prime Minister Edward Heath."

==== Andy Croall and "Satanic Ritual Abuse" ====
Britain's first alleged case of 'satanic' abuse was handled by staff at Nottinghamshire county council, and led to a debate on After Dark. Deputy director of social services Andy Croall was suspended by Nottinghamshire county council as a result of his appearance on the programme. The discussion on 9 March 1991 – "After Rochdale" – was later described by two academics:

(Satanic abuse) allegations collapsed during March 1991 ... That rare airing of issues in care proceedings led the Saturday night, three-hour round-table After Dark talk-show, popular with the opinion formers, to cover the subject. It then became the show to watch when news broke that the Royal Scottish Society for the Prevention of Cruelty to Children (RSSPCC), the Northern Constabulary (NC), and social workers from Orkney Islands Council (OIC) had carried on regardless and seized another nine children to save them from Satan. When Professor (Sherrill) Mulhern and Dr. Bill Thompson systematically explained how MPD and disclosure therapy were iatrogenic, and neither Beatrix Campbell nor the feminist or Christian social work directors had an answer, the media set out to extricate itself from its uncritical coverage of the NSPCC's claims by pouring all over Orkney.

Croall "agreeing with Campbell about the existence of satanic abuse" had said during the programme that "as a Christian I believe it's God time for it [satanic abuse] to be revealed ... it's a time when, in God's plan, it's going to be revealed." The Daily Telegraph reported what happened next: "More than 100 Christians gathered outside County Hall to demonstrate their support for Mr Andrew Croall ... Members of the National and Local Government Officers Association, meanwhile, held a protest backing the suspension. His supporters rallied before a meeting of the county social services committee. Mr Croall's remarks ... had outraged members of NALGO, who called for his resignation."

==== James Harries and "Teachers" ====
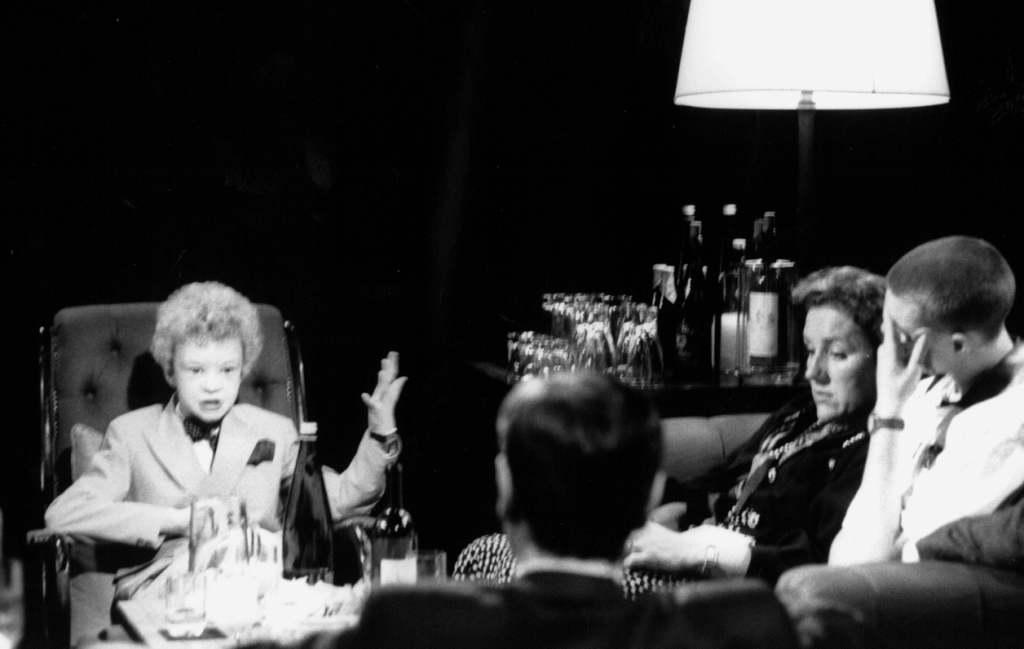
James Harries discussing "Teachers" 23 March 1991

The New Statesman described the programme broadcast on 23 March 1991:

James Harries, aged 12, sat perched forward on the edge of his seat, dwarfed by the upholstery that threatened to devour both him and his blonde mop of frizzy curls. Annis (Garfield) was too busy pouring wine to notice anything more than where the next bottle was coming from. And when Peter (Davies) was not receiving a refill, he was lighting up another cigarette and attacking anything that smacked of tolerance. This bizarre trio transformed a potentially tedious After Dark into the most extraordinary three hours of television all week ... Anthony Clare in the chair had an enormously difficult job. "I've chaired many After Dark discussions," he said, "and we've had politicians, sexologists ... but I've never seen any group of people less willing to listen to each other's point of view." Thank heaven, in all this, for Russell Profitt (deputy director of education in Southwark) and Zoe Readhead (daughter of A.S. Neill, and head teacher at Summerhill).

==== The Yorkshire Ripper ====
Today described the programme broadcast on 6 April 1991:

The Yorkshire Ripper may have turned killer because he was forced to wear short trousers as a child, his father claimed yesterday. Young Peter Sutcliffe was humiliated by being the only boy in his school wearing them, John Sutcliffe said on television. "Looking back, it was terrible we made the poor devil wait all that time," Mr Sutcliffe said ... "We were very unjust to him". Mr Sutcliffe ... admitted he had never visited his son since his transfer to top security Broadmoor hospital – on the orders of the Ripper's wife Sonia Sutcliffe ... He said Sonia was "extremely strange" but added: "There's nothing I would do to come between them if they feel that way."

The Daily Star added:

Mr Sutcliffe also blamed a teenage motorcycle accident for turning his son into a killer. "Apparently he damaged his head in the pile-up. From that moment on, from being a pretty introverted young man, he was just the opposite and became very, very extrovert. There was an absolute personality change" ... Mr Sutcliffe ... also claimed his son was not a "monster". "I believe some people are born evil, but my son wasn't one of them. There's nothing now evil about him. I wish you could all meet him. You'd be amazed how sensitive, kind he is."

Mr Sutcliffe also said his son was "a lovely lad" a description with which Michael Winner very much disagreed. The ICA wrote: "it ended with (Stefan Jaworzyn) vehemently debating the meaning of the word "integrity" with fellow guest Michael Winner".

== Later programmes ==
=== Specials ===
From 1993 Channel 4 broadcast a number of After Dark one-off specials. In 1995 the Financial Times wrote:

Channel 4 ended its remarkable season on capital punishment, "Lethal Justice", by reviving After Dark, the best studio discussion format ever created; why they do not run it 52 weeks a year is a mystery. Being live may mean enduring bores ... but you can also come across amazing people – a former American prison governor in this instance – who, most unusually, have enough time to explain their ideas. As so often with After Dark I switched on to watch 10 minutes and stayed till the end.

In 1997 a Channel 4 executive was said by The Guardian to be "insistent that 'it's a popular misconception that we killed it off. In fact we never lost it. We haven't done another series, but we did a one-off After Dark recently in our abortion season'. Bizarrely, Channel 4 cited After Dark as a model of the kind of cerebral programme it wanted when inviting (independent production company) submissions in May ... 'I can't think of any ideas that would make better late-night programming than After Dark,' he said, echoing the words of the original commissioning executive of After Dark, Seamus Cassidy, who in an interview to the Irish News in 2005 said, "I'm probably most proud of After Dark."

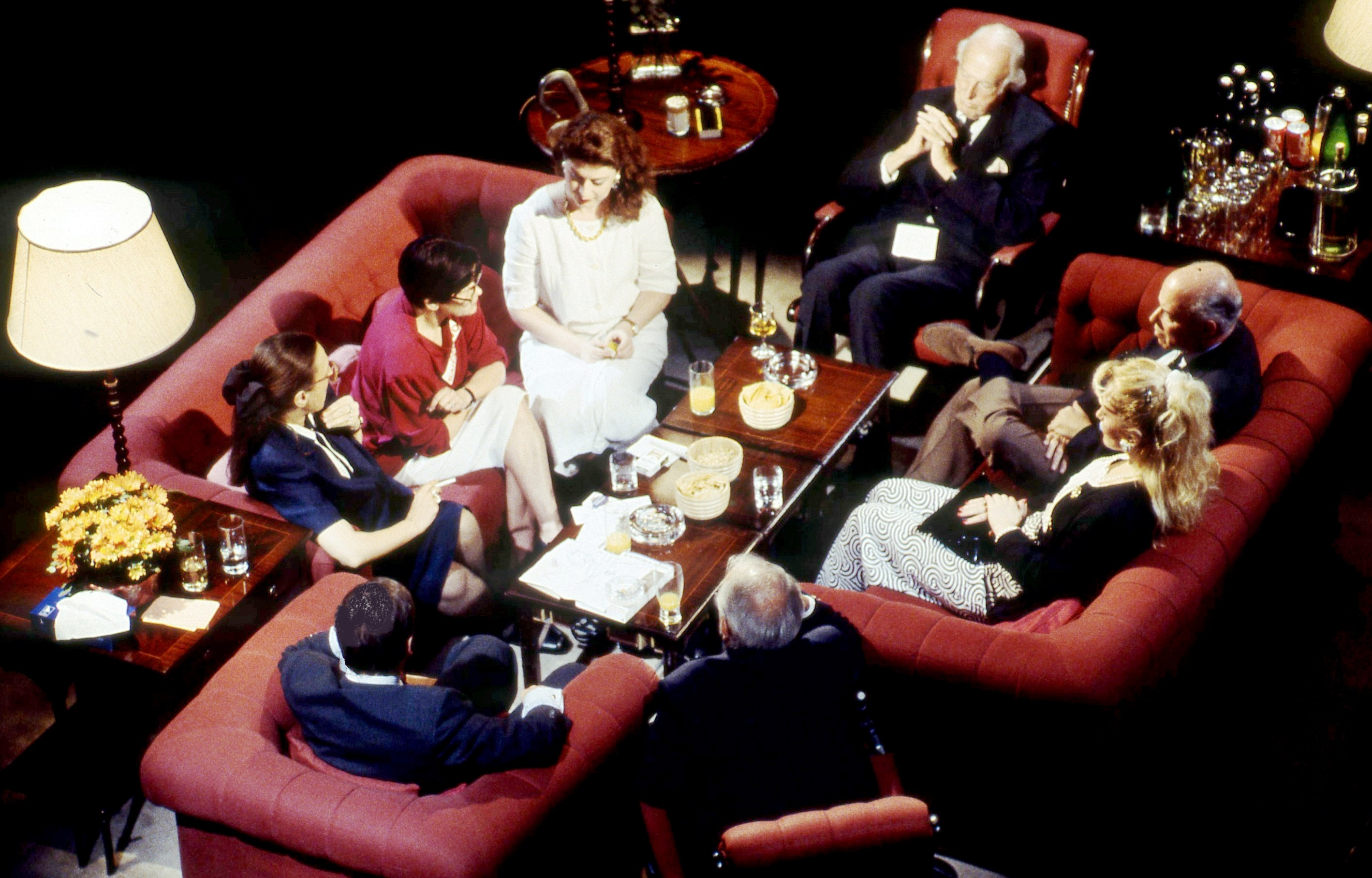
"Bloody Bosnia" – 7 August 1993

==== "Bloody Bosnia" ====
In 1993 The Independent magazine wrote of the first After Dark special, broadcast as part of the Channel 4 season Bloody Bosnia:

Among those taking part was Nikola Koljević, the vice-president of the so-called Serbian Republic of Bosnia. Among those opposing him, and arguing for a multi-ethnic, non-nationalist Bosnia ... were a Croatian historian, a Serb newspaper editor and a Muslim refugee.

During the programme viewers saw "Koljević admit Serb concentration camps in Bosnia". Also present was Sir Fitzroy Maclean, who was the British liaison to Josip Broz Tito's Partisans in World War II.

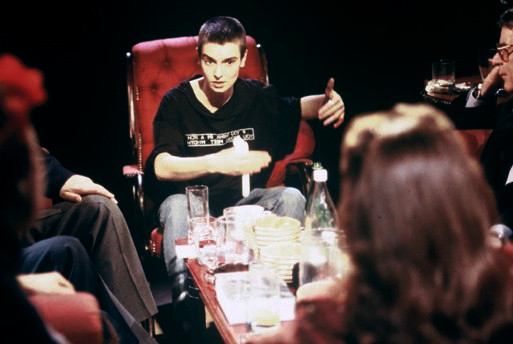
Sinéad O'Connor on After Dark on 21 January 1995

==== Sinéad O'Connor and "Ireland: Sex & Celibacy" ====
In January 1995 "Sinéad O'Connor was so interested in a discussion about [sexual] abuse and the Catholic church that she rang in to ask if she could appear. They sent a taxi to her home." The Evening Standard wrote that "After Dark made a brief reappearance last Saturday night when, true to its unpredictable form, Sinéad O'Connor walked on to the set 10 minutes before closedown." Host Helena Kennedy described the event:

On that occasion, former taoiseach, Garret FitzGerald, was sharing the sofas with a Dominican friar and a representative of the Catholic church. "While we were on the air, Sinéad O'Connor called in," says Kennedy. "Then I got a message in my earpiece to say she had just turned up at the studio. Sinéad came on and argued that abuse in families was coded in by the church because it refused to accept the accounts of women and children." But O'Connor's intervention was not all that pleased her that night. For Kennedy, herself from Irish Catholic stock, the real merit of the programme was the way the abuse scandals led into a wider debate, and a bigger picture of the social changes taking place in Ireland at the time, which were challenging teaching on contraception and divorce, and the traditional deference to the church. "It was more than a discussion of child sex abuse," she says. "You could see a new Ireland coming into being."

==== "Lethal Justice" ====
The Glasgow Herald wrote of the After Dark special broadcast on 17 August 1995:

The debate on judicial murder looked to be going nowhere. Positions were settled, opinions fixed. A defence lawyer, a policeman, a psychologist, a convicted murderer and a victim's widow were arrayed before us, each saying exactly what was expected of them. Then a fat, smiling American spoke. This was Don Cabana, a professor of Criminal Justice from Mississippi but once a prison governor and once, indeed, an executioner. Quietly, and with some effort, he described exactly what happens when cyanide is released into the chamber, when the gas touches the skin, when the convulsions and the soiling begins, and how it all affects those whose job it is to carry out the orders of the state ... It was a simple, unvarnished account, and the most riveting piece of television this week.

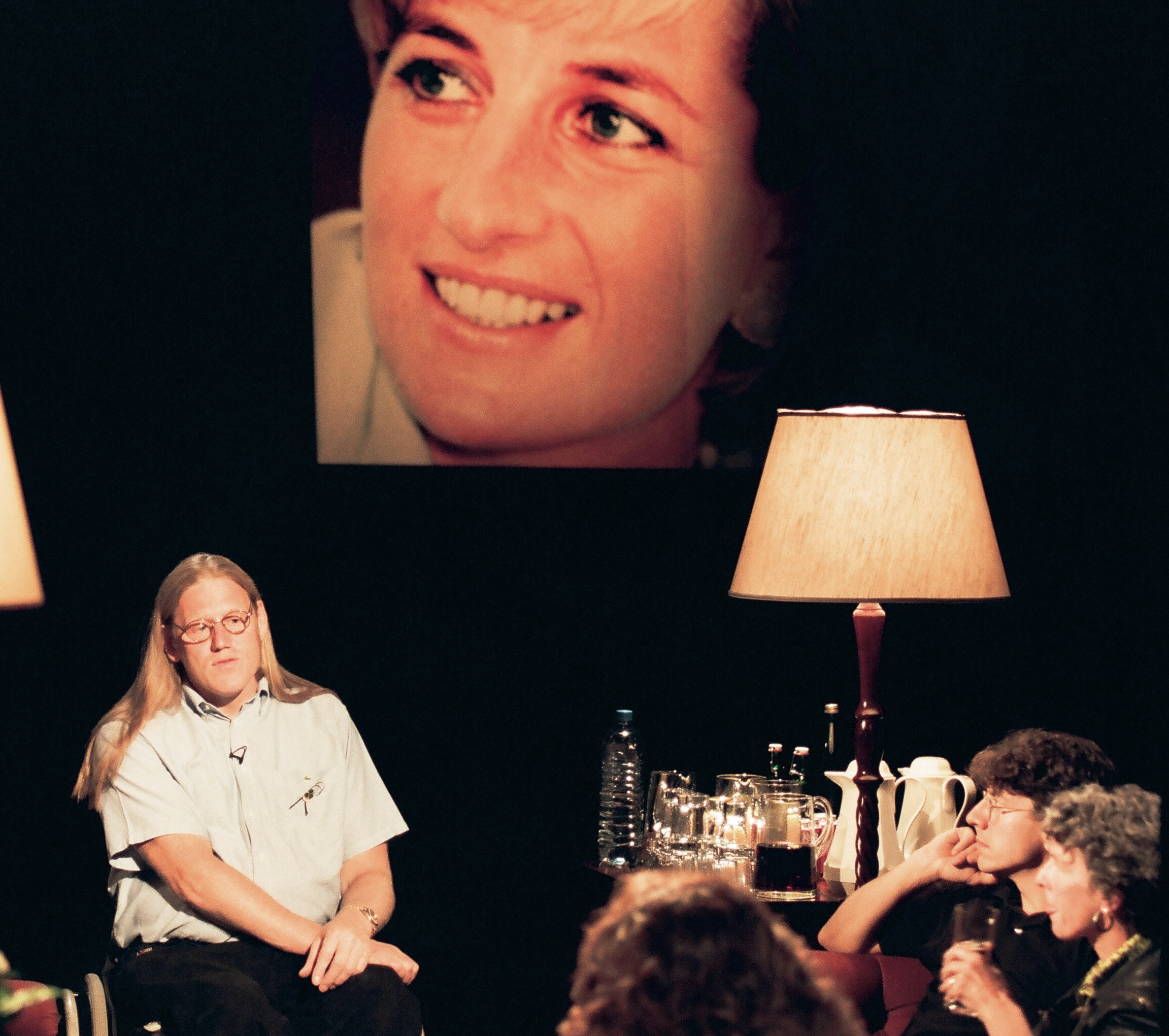
After Diana in 1997

==== "After Diana" ====
This special was broadcast on 13 September 1997, a fortnight after Diana, Princess of Wales died from the injuries she sustained in a car crash. With a rare appearance by Claus von Bülow, guests also included George Monbiot, Emmanuel Le Roy Ladurie and Beatrix Campbell, who "argued that Princess Diana had survived victimhood to realise her true self-identity".

=== BBC series ===
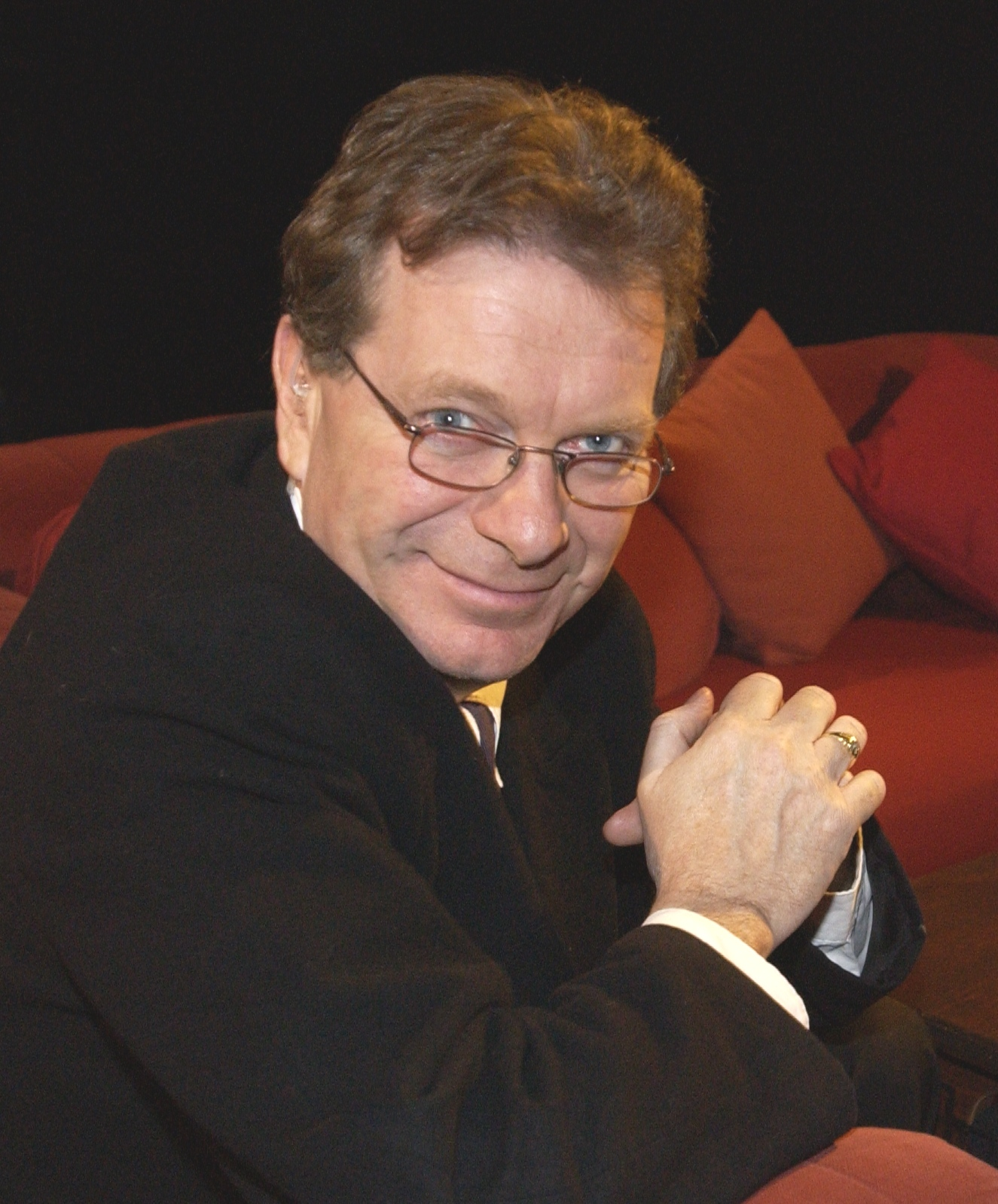
Tony Wilson hosting After Dark in 2003

In January 2003, The Guardian wrote:

After Dark, the open-ended discussion programme that gave its guests free rein to ruminate or ramble – depending on how much alcohol they had consumed – is to make a comeback on BBC Four ..." After Dark is one of the great television talk formats of all time – it was careless of Channel 4 to have let it go", said the BBCFour controller, Roly Keating. The programme allowed its guests to talk entirely freely. They were allowed to drink, if they wanted, and the programme ended only when they ran out of things to say.

It produced some memorable television moments: John Sutcliffe, father of the Yorkshire Ripper, was able to give a considered view of his son's behaviour; General Sir Anthony Farrar-Hockley, a former commander of British forces in Northern Ireland, swapped anecdotes with Bernadette Devlin; and arms dealer Joey Martyn-Martin claimed Mark Thatcher was a beneficiary of the international weapons trade. However, the show was dropped from its regular Saturday night slot in 1991 by the then Channel 4 chief executive, Michael Grade. His decision prompted a campaign by more than 100 public figures, from an astronaut to a zoologist, to save the programme. It returned the following year for occasional specials until its final demise in 1997.

The BBC Four version will remain unchanged in format, and will be made by the original producer ...: 'After Dark is a unique combination of a genuinely live programme, not on a delay of two hours like Question Time or five minutes like a radio programme. There is no studio audience, so the participants are under no obligation to exhibit themselves. There is no celebrity host who has to make himself look good. And, most important of all, it is open-ended, which shifts the power from the broadcaster and the producers to the participants.' He predicted that the programme could seem even more unusual now, in the age of slick and formatted television.

==== Tom O'Carroll and "Child Protection: How Far Should We Go?" ====
In March 2003 After Dark gave airtime to a self-confessed paedophile. The Guardian described the show:

Tom O'Carroll ... argues that sex with children is not harmful ... The 56-year-old is Ireland's most notorious paedophile. He moved to Leamington Spa in 1972 where he established the Paedophile Information Exchange ...(which) called for the open discussion of paedophilia and the abolition of laws against consensual sexual acts between children and adults. And the "boy lover" – as he calls himself – has addressed international conferences across the globe and written a book justifying the behaviour of those who prey on children. Mr O'Carroll and five other members of the exchange were convicted for "conspiring to corrupt public morals" in the 1980s by publishing a magazine advocating sex with children. He joined the After Dark panel for a discussion on paedophilia and child protection. Also on the panel were high profile child protection campaigner Esther Rantzen, lawyer Helena Kennedy QC, a former abuse victim, a criminologist, a solicitor and two academics. The BBC defended the decision to give a platform to Mr O'Carroll, saying he was invited on as part of a legitimate discussion about a topical issue."

==== Silke Maier-Witt and "Terrorism: Who Wins?" ====
A week later, a discussion about terrorism saw "the one-time Baader-Meinhof terrorist Silke Maier-Witt confess she could no longer remember why she had done what she did".

==== "Iraq: Truth and Lies?" ====
The last After Dark ("Iraq: Truth and Lies?") was transmitted on 29 March 2003. The producer wrote: "The very last After Dark programme ended, appropriately enough perhaps, with a plug for the campaign for a screen-free TV Turnoff Week".

=== 1988 ===
- On 11 March, fashion designer Bruce Oldfield arrived well after the programme began, having decided to finish his meal in a West End restaurant before joining the other guests.
- On 30 April – during a discussion between a witch, a psychiatrist, an exorcist and an alleged victim of Satanic abuse – After Dark became possibly the first UK TV programme to air claims that newborn babies were ritually consumed.
- On 27 August, one of the Oz trial defendants was reintroduced to the judge who sentenced him.

=== 1989 ===
- On 16 September, possibly the first discussion about paedophilia on British television featured a perpetrator, a victim and a psychiatrist who recommended castration.
- On 18 November, Whitley Strieber, who said he was abducted by space aliens, met astronaut Buzz Aldrin.
- On 25 November, a man who proposed to take up the offer by the then government of South Africa to emigrate to their country very cheaply, was introduced to South Africans who told him what to expect, including newspaper editor Donald Woods and the musician Abdullah Ibrahim, who closed the programme with an extended jazz impro on piano.
- "One show ("Counting The Cost of a Free Press", 2 February 1991) was plunged into darkness by a power cut. The guests carried on talking during the blackout."
- "Mary Whitehouse was told by a female pensioner: 'What women want is a Mars bar and a bottle of gin.'"
- "The guest who consumed the most alcohol was philosopher A. J. Ayer. 'He had been through the best part of a bottle of Scotch, but he was still brilliant.'"

=== 1997 ===
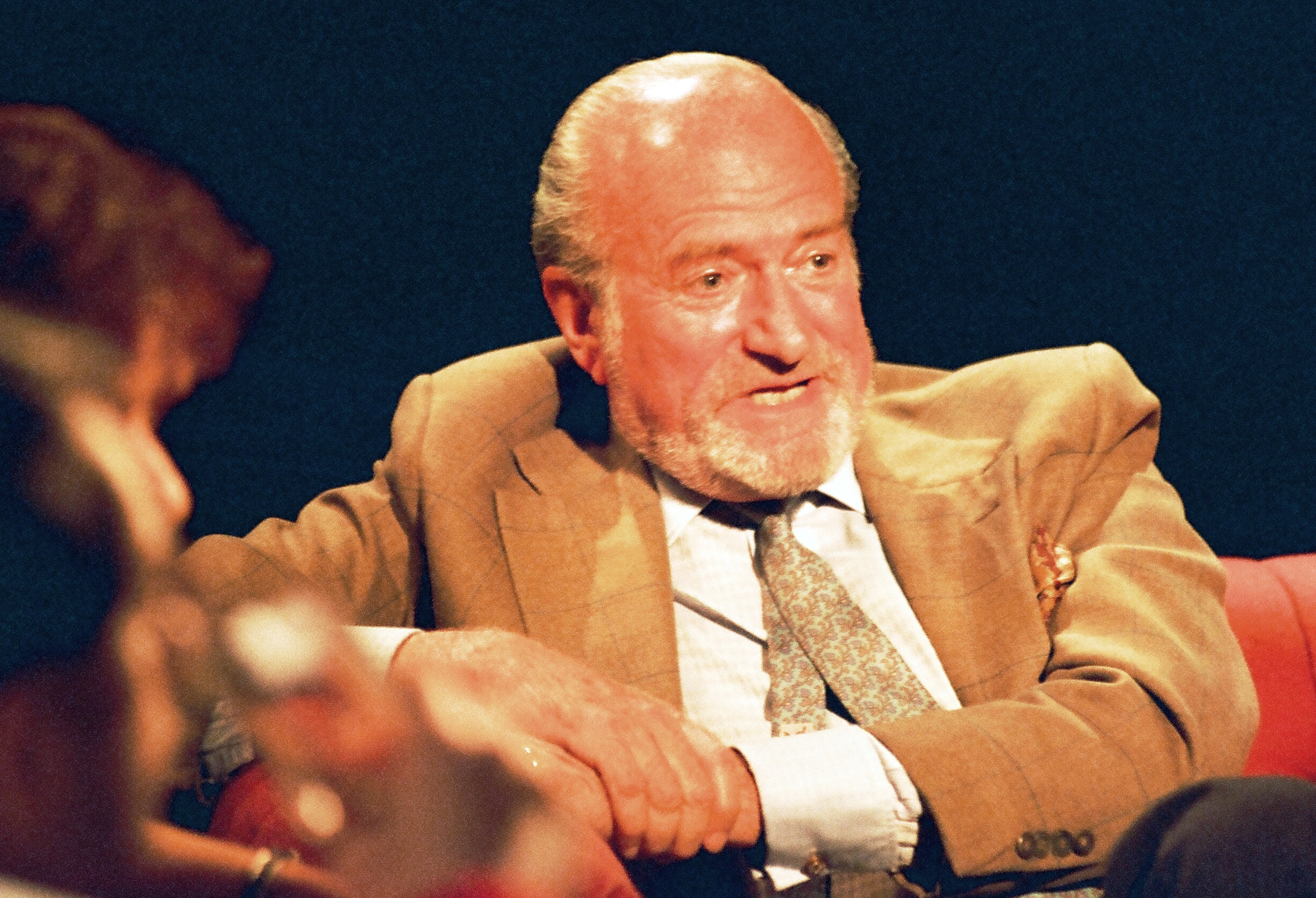
Claus von Bülow, "After Diana", 13 September 1997

- On 13 September, After Dark featured an appearance by Claus von Bülow.

== Production ==
=== Editorial ===
The producer wrote: "We made programmes about familiar British issues (or 'diseases', as we called them): the treatment of children, of the mentally ill, of prisoners, and about class, cash and racial and sexual difference. Several programmes were concerned with matters of exceptional sensitivity to the then Thatcher government, such as state secrecy or the Troubles in Northern Ireland. Places further afield but just as important – Chile, Eritrea, Iran, Iraq, Israel, Nicaragua, South Africa and Russia – featured regularly, as did programmes explicitly about the pressures history puts on the present (After Dark noted anniversaries as various as the Second World War and the death of Freud). Less apparently solemn subjects – sport, fashion, gambling, pop music – were in the mix from the start and turned out to be more serious than viewers might have expected."

The main themes of After Dark were listed in an internal memo in 1988:

1. Lovelessness: the spaces in our society that for whatever reason are cold, empty, formulaic, unfeeling, systematised and filled only with empty rhetoric or silence.
2. Who owns your body? Do you? Does the State? Your doctor? Your lover? The police? Your parents? This theme covers a variety of apparently unrelated subjects: imprisonment, health care, capital punishment, mental illness, abortion, schooling ...
3. What happens "after dark"? Sex, crime, astronomy ...
4. Shining light into the shadows we find not only Ralf Dahrendorf's underclass but also the invisible people. Some invisible people are so because they choose to be (criminals, spies, the hidden rich) but others are invisible because we do not want to see them (the homeless, the dispossessed, the mentally confused, the dying ...). Among the invisible there is a new slave class: some of those were uncovered by Gunther Wallraff in his documentary "The Lowest of the Low" (illegal immigrants who are used for clearing up nuclear accidents although the work is known to be fatal).
5. Do you want to know a secret? Guests tell all, or their bit of it.
6. What is beyond the law? Who is beyond the law?
7. Not knowing is an act of choice. During a discussion on the Holocaust, an Austrian woman claimed "We did not know"; another participant countered by saying that not all knowing comes from reading newspapers. Looking, listening and drawing deductions are another way of knowing, so choosing not to look or listen or draw a deduction can be conscious "not knowing". So: what things in our society are we choosing to look away from, choosing not to know? What will our grandchildren accuse us of?"

=== Guest selection ===
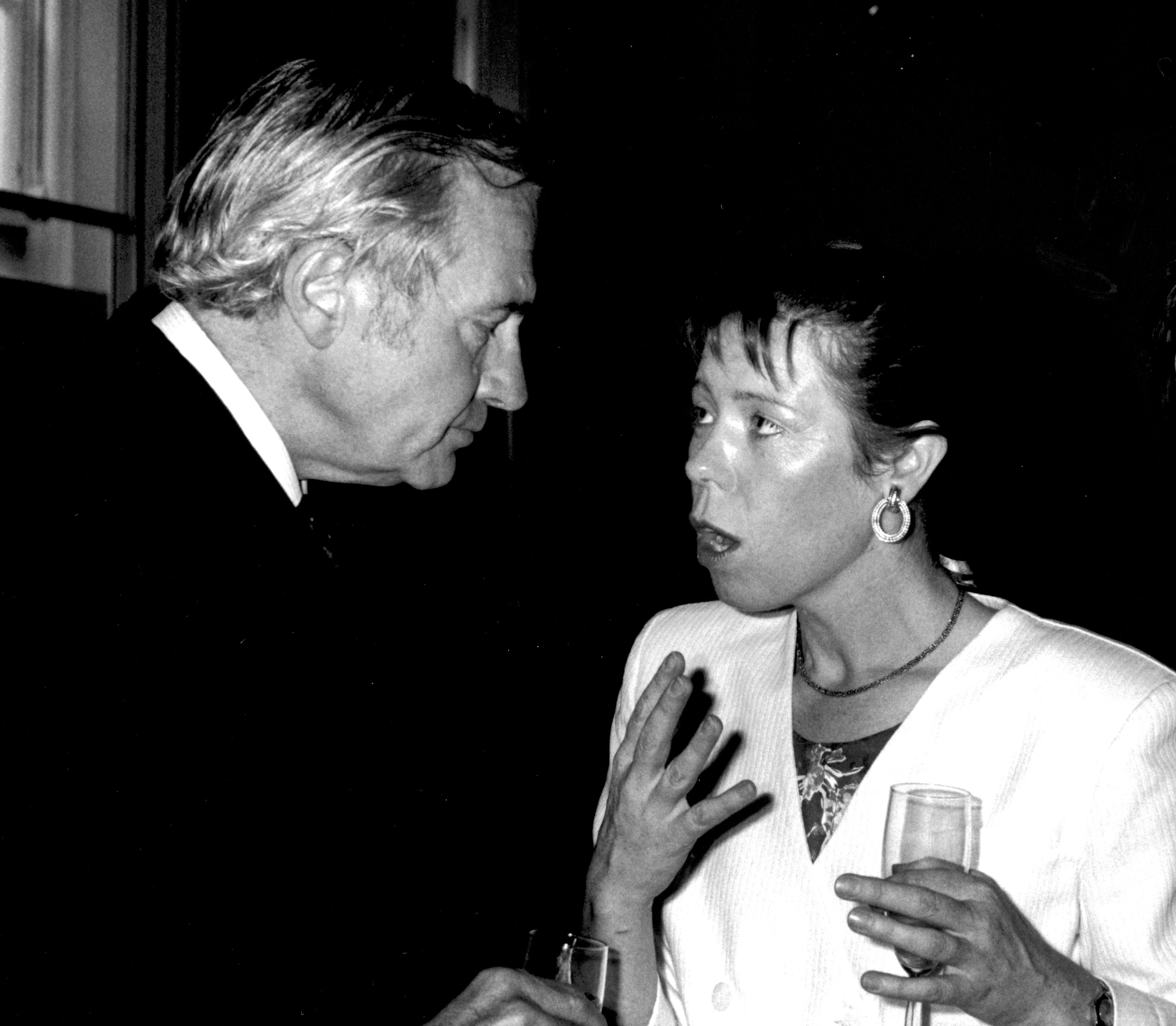
Ex-MP John Stonehouse after a pilot episode in 1987

"After Dark is different: experts sit side by side with ordinary people – irrespective of age, race, gender or sexual orientation – whose experience happens to relate to the subject ... (The producer says) 'An average show should consist of Punch, Judy, a crocodile, a hangman and a grandmother'." 'There's nobody I wouldn't have on the programme'.

Mark Lawson wrote in The Independent:

The Watergate conspirator John Ehrlichman was at the dentist when the surgery phone rang. It was for him. A voice from London: how would he like to take part in an open-ended, very-late-night discussion on the nature of truth. If he was interested, he had four hours to get on the plane ... Jeremy Isaacs, in his farewell speech to the television industry, counted (After Dark) among the innovations of which he was most proud ... The key to the series ... is the casting ... (The producer says) "We start with one or two people without whom the discussion wouldn't take place, the catalysts. Then there are the people who are not known TV performers but who will bring personal testimony to issues which would otherwise be argued theoretically. Then there are the historians or journalists who provide a context ... In a documentary the meetings between these points of view would happen in a cutting room or, at best, around a table under bright lights with time running out. You don't, in any other programme, get the full nuances of a meeting between people."

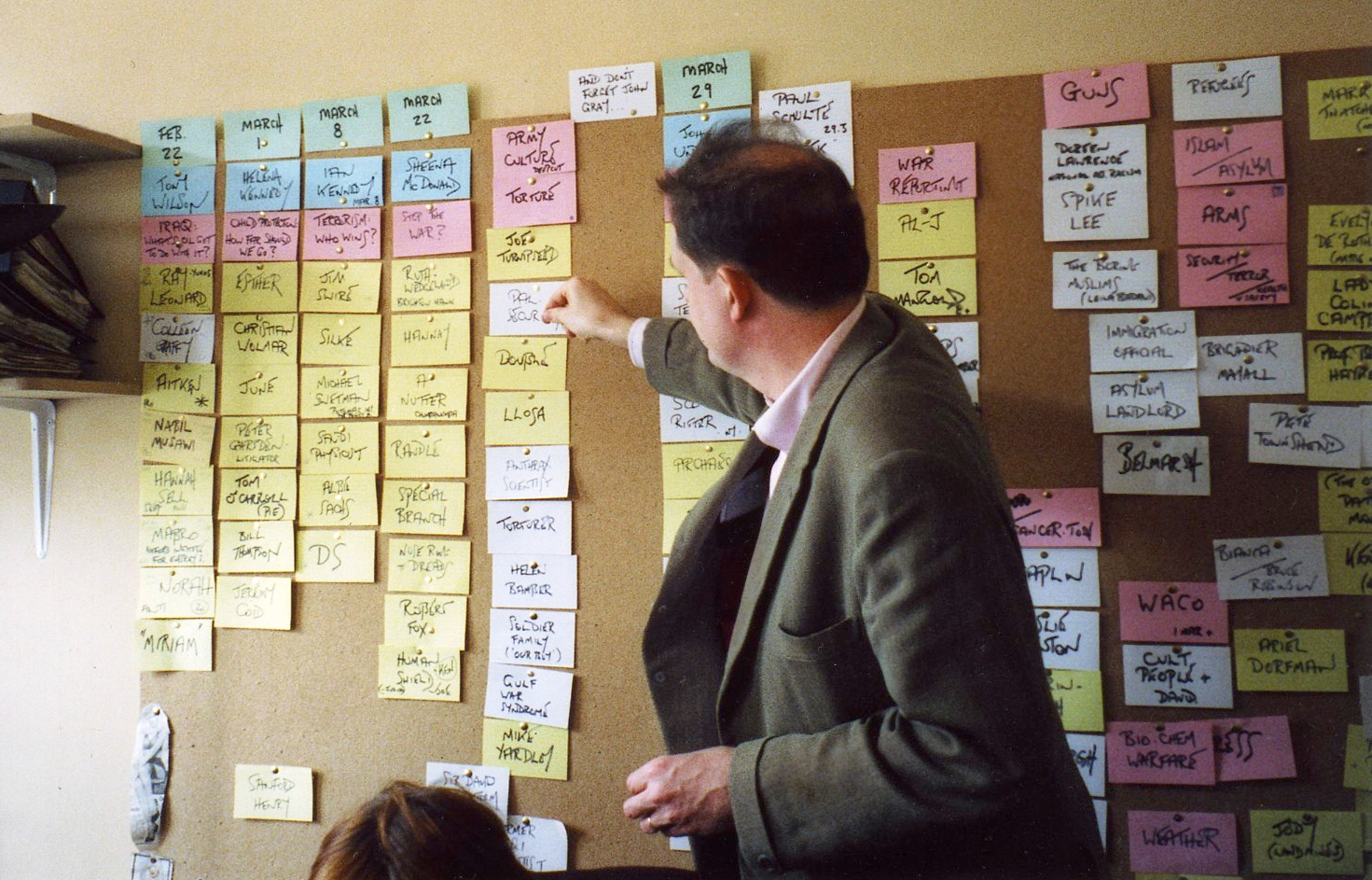
A production meeting in 2003

The Times wrote: "Some of the juxtapositions have been inspired." "After the Nelson Mandela concert last summer it ran a discussion programme including Harry Belafonte, Breyten Breytenbach, Denis Worrall and Ismail Ayob, Mandela's lawyer. Belafonte came directly from Wembley with a police escort for his only British TV appearance. Programme hired a private plane to fly in Breytenbach. Worrall came from South Africa at After Dark expense. But this largesse is apparently unusual."

The producer wrote: "In amongst the exceptional and the celebrated, the stars and the scandalous, quieter folk often triumphed. Those who had written to us with a story to tell or who had been discovered through diligent research found that the format allowed them a voice, despite strong competition. Though maybe as late as an hour or more into the programme, they could nonetheless re-shape the discussion and might well trump the polished assertions of more professional experts."

A television historian wrote in 2011 that the programme "was not concerned to allow the revelation of celebrities' private lives or the promotion of their products, they were expected to converse seriously. Oliver Reed appeared drunk, groped Kate Millett and was removed; in contrast Bianca Jagger appeared in intellectual debate with several high-ranking American officials over the Contras in Nicaragua".

=== Working method ===
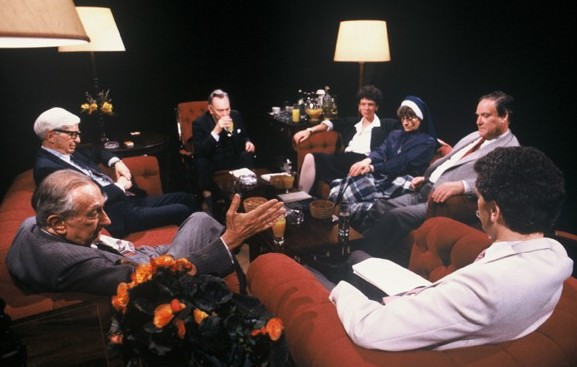
"Peace in Our Time", 3 July 1987, with Edward Teller, Beatrix Campbell, Rudolf Peierls, Enoch Powell, Sergei Kapitsa and host John Underwood.

The Times wrote:

After Dark has managed a genuinely fresh approach. It has done so by freeing itself of such conventions as a studio audience and a set running time, of carrying on through commercial breaks and of dealing with one subject instead of several.

and the TV trade magazine Televisual commented:

The show was successful in making its guests forget the cameras and the host. Edward Teller, inventor of the H-bomb, only agreed to appear on the show because it wasn't edited.

The programme was "the most uncensorable programme in the history of British television. Genuinely live – unlike many so-called "live" shows which are delayed by seconds or longer – and crucially open-ended, the participants in these unique broadcast discussions were able to take control of the content: the programme concluded only when everyone had said everything they wanted to say."

The producer described the working method:

... so designed as to empower the guests, rather than have them act out a preordained and inevitably limited agenda designed by others. In all the ways that matter the control of After Dark passed from the producer and the broadcaster to the participants. As a result it was never our show – it always belonged to the guests, which is only right, proper and as it should be but normally never is ... The special freedoms guaranteed by the programme were grabbed by the participants, who often said the apparently unsayable. Intelligent production kept us out of the law courts, if not out of hot water.

Presenter Tony Wilson said "After Dark kept its participants apart before the transmission" Presenter John Underwood reckons the first give-away is guests' choice of seats when they enter the studio: "Power figures, people used to being listened to, plump themselves down opposite the host. The seat on the presenters' right, a bit in the shadows, is chosen by dark horses whose contributions are few but deadly." He also relishes the unexpected alliances that are formed and the genuine dialogue that becomes possible.

Jay Rayner described the backstage atmosphere in Arena magazine:

The situation is a little more controlled than the viewer might imagine ... As the guests arrived they were shepherded off to individual dressing rooms. Such solitary confinement was to protect the guests from meeting each other and ... talking themselves out before the television fun began ... The plush red furniture is positioned on a well-planned formation: two long couches on each side, two big armchairs at either end where, it is hoped, strong personalities might sit, and an outsider's chair on one corner, pushed back into the shadows ... the seating plan was designed by an Austrian psychologist for the original programme, though none of the guests are told where to sit ... The researchers used their personal knowledge of each guest to help the discussion along. From a phone in the hospitality room they rang the TV gallery and asked the directors to urge Ian Kennedy, that evening's host, to call upon particular members of the party who were well-informed in the area under discussion. Using the radio link secreted in Kennedy's ear the directors passed the message to him. A few seconds later, as though the researchers were lip synching with Kennedy, the question came out of his mouth. It was an act of great skill ... the guests had managed to relax in the usually intimidating environment of a TV studio ... They had been given a proper environment to talk in and they had done just that.

City Limits wrote:

As Don Coutts, director of the show, says 'the first half-hour sounds like a Newsnight situation, but after a while people relax and get properly into the subject ... Given that it is a set-up situation and cast quite carefully, after that it's completely open'.

Q magazine quoted the producer: "We're actually trying to break down the barriers that divide people ... Jeremy Isaacs told us it was the best proposal for a live show he'd ever seen." "I really don't know what's going to happen." The Listener magazine said 'After Dark has taken the format towards the realm of psychodrama, peeling away its participants layers of restraint and front.'"

=== Hosts ===
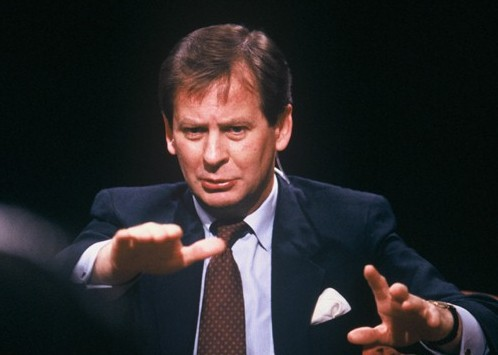
Ian Kennedy hosting After Dark in 1987

The production team sought hosts who were "more than the usual mechanical hack audience appeal" and "a facilitator rather than a celebrity figure". Senior director Coutts intended their role to be minimal, saying that "They interrupt if everyone is shouting at each other and generally just keep things going." He added that getting the hosts to "shut up" was the most difficult thing. "Tony Wilson, a familiar face to programme watchers in Granadaland, understands that he will not be the host next week. Indeed he knows he will not be asked again if he attempts to direct the discussion."

At a broadcasting conference in 1992 Tony Wilson said:

One of my privileges in television is that the wonderful Sebastian Cody let me present several editions of After Dark. You cannot record a programme like that. You cannot get those human and emotional and intellectual things to happen ... Somewhere about twenty or thirty minutes in, you poke a couple of questions ... and it's like you know that train has started, the roller coaster, and you will be on it for at least two and a half hours. And that roller coaster of emotions and intellect is fused with the red lights. It's fused with the fact that this is live television. Those people are aware of it. You are aware of it. That is the great delight of it.

In 2021 journalist Fergal Kinney wrote of Tony Wilson’s work as a host of the programme:

His appearances on Channel 4’s freewheeling late-night debate show After Dark...are exhilarating, pitched somewhere between a malevolent David Dimbleby and a slightly effete Jonathan Meades.

Other frequent presenters of the series included Prof. Anthony Clare, Helena Kennedy QC, Prof. Sir Ian Kennedy, Sheena McDonald, Matthew Parris and John Underwood. Those who hosted only one edition include Anthony Holden, Stuart Hood, Henry Kelly and John Plender.

=== Staffing ===
The Guardian ran the first recruitment advertisement for programme staff:

In May Channel 4 launch an extraordinary discussion programme ... Open Media are offering a number of short-term contracts on this remarkable series ... We need senior researchers with considerable experience of current affairs television, versatility, good humour, a limitless capacity for work and, above all, sympathy with and knowledge of many different viewpoints and people – not all of them sympathetic.

The producer wrote:

Diversity was anyway guaranteed by the colourful production teams who researched the programmes. It was the 1980s so we employed a member of Militant (at least I think he used to get the newspaper) but also a member of a Roman Catholic sect, a retired rent boy and someone who was later splashed across the front page of The Observer as an SIS agent. We gave a break to a minicab driver who nonetheless carried on sending us abusive faxes for years. There was a troublesome former Private Eye man whose stories led me to discover that Peter Cook was a serious and professional proprietor (Cook's otherwise incessant comedy shtick vanished when he discussed the magazine's personnel problems). There was no collective bias: the staff were a motley crew who fought hard to promote their individual interests.

A gameshow producer got his break into television by writing to After Dark: "They eventually put me on a very short contract cutting articles out of the papers. It was the most junior job I'd ever had and I was extremely happy! Over the next two series of After Dark, I read and cut 10 newspapers a day, 10 magazines a week, plus monthly digests of foreign press – a fantastic introduction to current affairs. I enjoyed the intellectual cut-and-thrust of the office, the thrill of live broadcasting, and the diversity of the subjects we covered."

A senior member of staff described her working week:

On Saturdays when the show goes out, I might be in the studio till 5 am. On a weekday, I might have a 10 am start, kicking off with a production meeting. This includes everyone who works for Open Media, the production company – plus a couple of experts on topics we are considering for the future. We have a post mortem on the previous Saturday's programme. Then we move onto next week's show. We discuss possible guests and possible hosts. Later on, we break up into smaller units of one producer and two or three researchers. Within my team, I will draw up a shortlist of maybe 15 guests and 20 books to be read. I will allocate tasks, giving myself a slightly smaller workload so that I can keep a supervisory eye on the overall progress of the one or two projects in hand. I spend the rest of the day on the phone, liaising with my colleagues and meeting useful contacts.

=== Direction ===
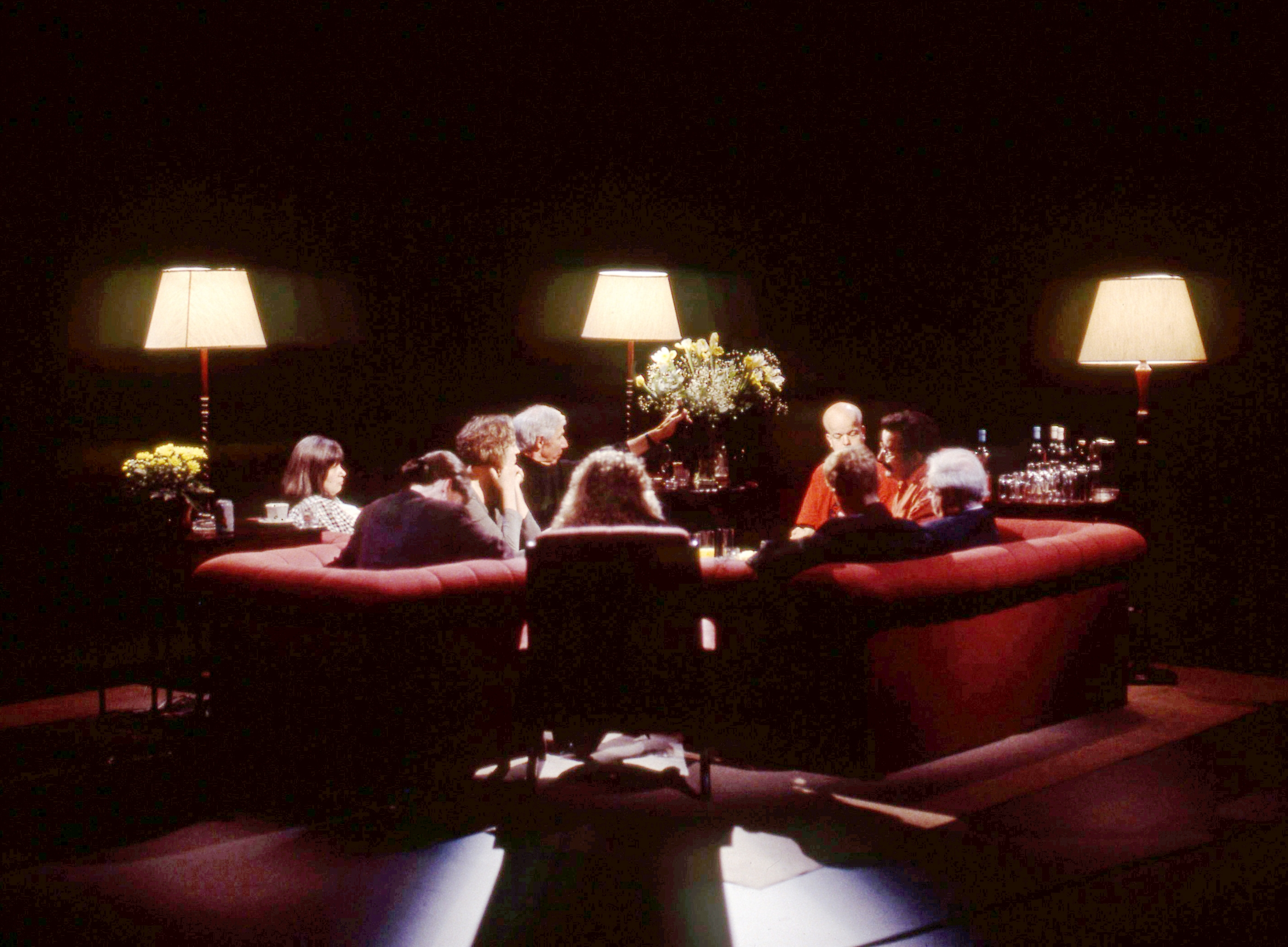
"Brave New World?", 1994

In 2021 The Daily Telegraph wrote: "Don Coutts directed it like a drama. 'Because it was a drama every week...And it wasn't always about the person speaking. There was a lot of looking at other people'". About the look of the show Coutts said "We used big close-ups, pulled focus or used a panning system. The camera work was radical ... The idea was to use very low light conditions, and an atmosphere that was supposed to be dark and moody". Coutts is still pleased with the way viewers could turn the television on and within seconds know that what they were watching couldn't be anything other than After Dark."

The producer wrote: "Guests sat in a circle and so concentrated on each other rather than the cameras. For the benefit of the watching audience at home, the participants were often filmed listening, a sight far more expressive than the faces we make when speaking. In fact After Dark gave such opportunities for listening that on occasion viewers even saw guests – slowly, perhaps only provisionally but nonetheless – changing their minds on air.".

=== Legal ===
A Channel 4 lawyer wrote:

After Dark producers weighed the chances of the guest behaving naturally against becoming tongue-tied because of a frightening formal legal document and opted for the side of freer speech. A Channel 4 lawyer was always on hand to explain the handling of particularly sensitive areas to guests, informally warning them of dangers ahead. Particular problems encountered included contempt of court or possible identification of minors during the debate on the Cleveland child abuse cases. It was especially important to give guidance on contempt of court as guests risked a criminal offence if they committed contempt. The Channel 4 duty lawyer sat up in the gallery to spot problems as they happened. If disaster struck the lawyer would speak to the host at the earliest possible (commercial) break. If the host had not already responded by making it clear that a guest's libellous views were his or hers alone, that is.

=== Cancellation ===
In August 1991, Channel 4 announced the end of the series, an action which became the subject of an editorial in The Times.

==== Channel 4 axing ====
The Independent newspaper noted: "Grade's programming is confused: he axed the talk show ... allegedly to make way for even more innovative programmes, yet replaced it with a series of Seventies repeats. He praised After Dark lavishly in public but, in a letter to Edward Heath, said it 'promised more than it delivered'." The producer wrote later in an article in Lobster magazine:

Much to everyone's surprise, the programme survived the novelty of its form and remained a great event for some years, even to the extent that the head of the network, Jeremy Isaacs, selected it as one of his all-time favourite programmes when he left C4 and wrote a book. Not everyone was wholly supportive, however. Although launched by Isaacs, most of the ninety After Dark programmes were made under the reign of Michael Grade, who we were never sure actually watched the show. And Grade, always more of an aspiring Establishment man than his time at C4 suggested, had concerns. Interviewed some years after he axed After Dark for uncertain reasons, Grade said: "It (After Dark) was an interesting idea and well worth pursuing. I thought it was very badly produced, editorially."

An open letter was published, signed by Professor Sir Ian Kennedy, Buzz Aldrin, Billy Bragg, Beatrix Campbell, Lord Dacre, Gerald Kaufman, Mary Midgley, Richard Perle, Merlyn Rees, Richard Shepherd, Ralph Steadman, Peter Ustinov, Lord Weidenfeld and many others:

We have learnt with great concern of Channel 4's decision not to continue with the television discussion programme After Dark. Some of us have worked on and with this production, others have been its on-screen guests, still others have no professional connection with the programme but as viewers have found After Dark uniquely entertaining, instructive and informative. We do not want to see it disappear.

Angela Lambert wrote later in The Independent:

I am truly sorry to hear that the Saturday small hours talk show After Dark is to be dropped by Channel 4. It was the most original programme on television, and the only one in which the sound of the human voice – angry, boring, repetitive, excitable, but occasionally passionate, revealing and unforgettable – overcame the patina of artifice with which television habitually polishes and tidies up its speakers. Only on After Dark could we have heard the rolling Russian timbre of Tatyana Tolstaya ... or seen Clare Short squirm as Tony Howard wondered why, if she was so protective about her private life, she'd talked on radio to Anthony Clare ... Only After Dark had the leisurely pace that made possible the exchange between the Holocaust survivor Rabbi Hugo Gryn and Yasser Arafat's PR voice Karma Nabulsi, whose mutual desire for a world in which their grandchildren could play together was so moving; and allowed Wendy Savage to admit to her own continuing pain at performing abortions. Late as the show was (and being open-ended, it sometimes ran till 3am) it was the most compulsive and dangerous viewing on the air. That'll be why they dropped it.

The producers wrote warning that After Dark's "loss poses such a threat to broadcasting freedom. It is ... the only television programme whose guests were not straitjacketed into a fixed time-slot, subjected to precensorship or editing, or confronted with a celebrity host and a noisy studio audience. That year and on through the 1990s we argued, loudly, that After Dark should be put back on air, it being an effective and necessary corrective to the limitations and excessive controls created by the mass broadcasting of those days."

=== Specials and BBC version ===
The show ended in 1991 but a number of one-off specials were broadcast from 1993 and 1997.

In 2003, it was revived by the BBC for a single series, broadcast on BBC Four.

=== Channel 4 anniversaries ===
In October 2007, as part of its 25-year anniversary celebrations, Channel 4 repeated the first ever After Dark on the More4 channel, billing it as "Anthony Wilson hosts a discussion concerning secrets – both secrets of the State and the personal secrets we keep from one another." In 2012, on the occasion of the 30th anniversary of Channel 4, After Dark featured prominently in a number of two-page tributes in British newspapers.

=== BFI InView ===
In 2009 the British Film Institute announced that After Dark programmes were available online through its InView service. This web-based learning resource was free but accessible only to UK Higher Education/Further Education institutions, in partnership with The National Archives, the Parliamentary Broadcasting Unit, the BBC, FremantleMedia and the After Dark production company Open Media. The BFI said InView offered examples of how some of the UK's key social, political and economic issues have been represented and debated. Until the service came to an end in 2020 fifty editions of what the BUFVC called 'the much missed series After Dark' were streamed online.

== Reception ==
=== Viewer response ===
In 1987, The Guardian wrote: "After Dark, the closest Britain gets to an unstructured talk show, is already finding that the more serious the chat, the smaller the audience ... Channel 4's market research executive Sue Clench ... says that around three million saw some of After Dark in its first slot."

The audience survey conducted later by Channel 4 reported that After Dark was watched by 13% of all adults, rising to what the research company referred to as a "staggering figure" of 28% amongst young men. One viewer is quoted in the academic study Talk on Television as follows:

After Dark is far better because it allows people to go over all sorts of stages in a discussion and they are not shut off. Well I suppose they are on for three or four hours, but I think that is a really good idea, that you can really work everything out for yourself.

The programme is still fondly remembered by viewers. For example, in 2016, Gail Walker, the editor of the Belfast Telegraph, recalled After Dark programmes about nuclear issues and in 2020 the Cardiff-based writer Joe Morgan wrote a tribute A Sword in the Darkness, saying the show "broke all existing rules and conventions. There has been nothing like it ever since". In 2022 the Liberal Democrat Jonathan Calder published Remembering After Dark, the best TV discussion programme ever.

=== Critical response ===
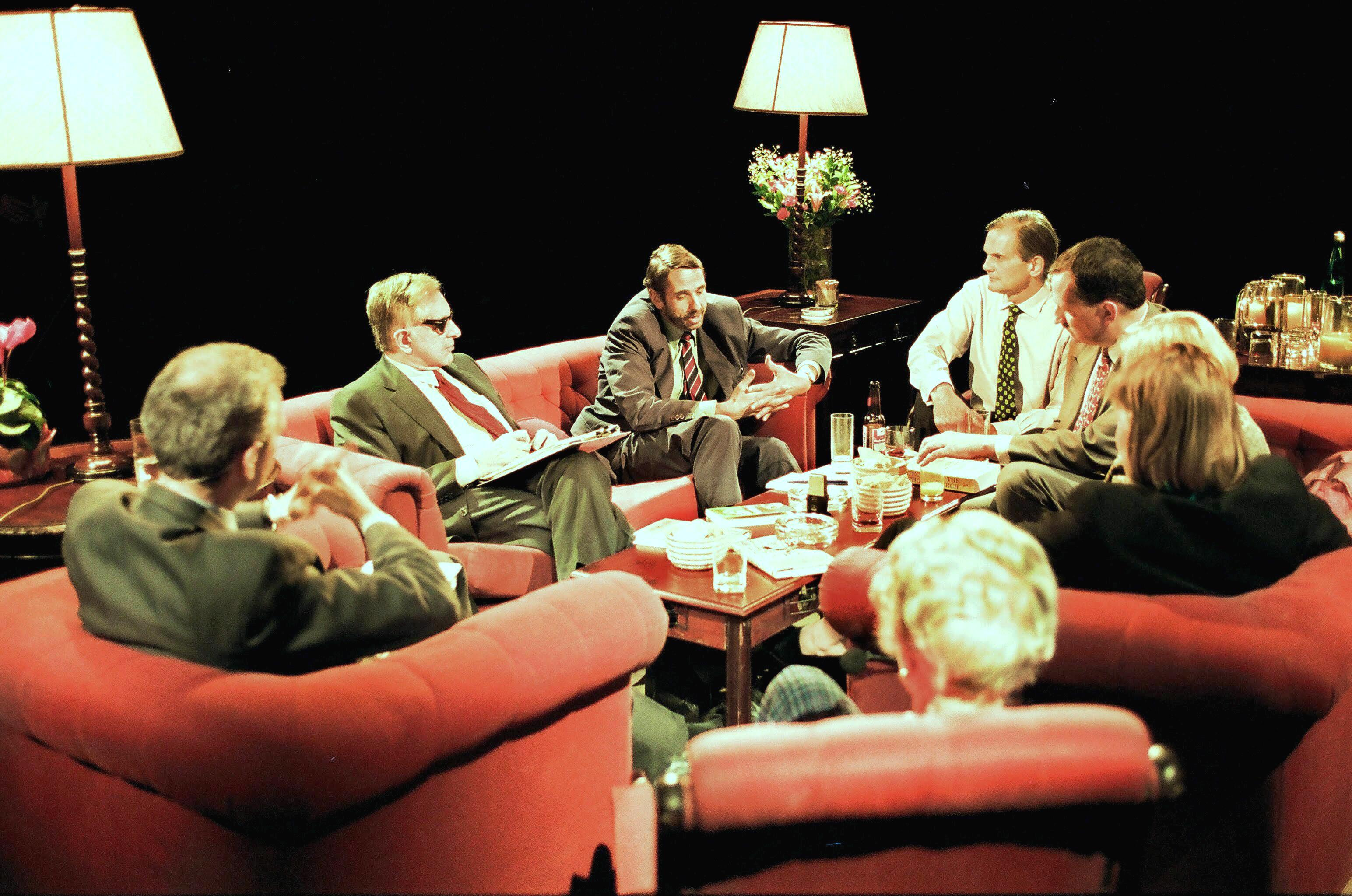
"Abortion - Whose Choice?", 1 November 1997

After Dark earned critical praise, from the Socialist Worker ("my favourite chat show") and The Guardian ("one of the most inspired and effective uses of airtime yet devised"), and The Daily Telegraph ("A shining example of late-night television"), to more media focussed journals such as the BFI's Sight & Sound ("often made The Late Show look like the Daily Mirror") and the American publication Variety in its review of the year ("compulsive for late-night viewers"). The Listener magazine called it "The programme in which you can see the people think".

In 2004 After Dark was characterised as "legendary" by the Open University.

In 2012, on the 30th anniversary of Channel 4, After Dark featured in a number of tributes in British newspapers, and in 2014 as "the most uncensorable programme in the history of British television". In 2016 The Herald wrote that "Unlike reality television live feeds today, After Dark was essential viewing, with some very serious talk enlivened even more by unexpected events." In 2017 the Journal of British Cinema and Television called it "an excitingly different and politically adventurous kind of programme" and in 2018 an academic history of independent television production in the UK judged it "as an 'experiment' that challenged the limitations of television as a medium of intensive and democratic deliberation and discussion it was very successful, and from the vantage of history still seems remarkably fresh to this day."

In 2020 Simon Heffer wrote in The Daily Telegraph that "the time is surely ripe for the return of a programme such as After Dark" and The Guardian listed After Dark as one of the "jewels" in the history of television - "it offered a thing that's now extinct: constructive debate". In 2021 The Daily Telegraph wrote of the "curious brilliance" of the show: "It feels like the art of reasonable discussion has been lost in the modern world ... increasingly sanitised and controlled since the freeform days of After Dark".

In 2022 After Dark was compared favourably to the Joe Rogan podcast The Joe Rogan Experience in an article by former Financial Times journalist Izabella Kaminska: "edgy and compulsive viewing precisely because it was long-winded, unscripted and live. Guests would frequently get so triggered by each other that someone would inevitably get up and leave in a huff."

=== Guest response ===
Author James Rusbridger wrote in The Listener magazine: "When I appeared on a Channel 4 After Dark programme recently my postman, milkman and more than two dozen strangers stopped me in the street and said how much they'd enjoyed it and quoted verbatim extracts from the discussion."

The comic writer William Donaldson ran a column in The Independent newspaper about attempts made by After Dark staff to contact him (they "didn't know me from a hole in the road and merely wanted Janie Jones's number").

In 2021 author David Hebditch wrote an article about appearing on After Dark to discuss pornography. It is available here.

Journalist Peter Hillmore described appearing on After Dark:

In the age of the glib, packaged sound-bite, a discussion programme that is long and open-ended, lasting as long as the talk is remotely interesting, occasionally longer, seems a necessity. For all its faults, as when Oliver Reed appeared tired and emotional as a newt, the programme fulfilled its purpose and filled a gap. I appeared on it once. It was a strange feeling to realise that if you had failed to make your point properly, you had more time a short while later. So Channel 4's decision to axe it seems incomprehensible and wrong ... In his book on the channel, its founder Jeremy Isaacs gave a long list of programmes that he felt summed up its ethos. With the ending of After Dark, not a single programme from the list remains. That is not a coincidence.

== Episodes ==
An extended article including more detail of individual episodes is on the production company's website here. From 2010 to 2020 individual programmes were available for online streaming at BFI InView.

== In popular culture ==
- After Dark featured in Biff cartoons from The Guardian in 1988.
- After Dark was parodied on a regular basis as part of the BBC1 comedy series Alas Smith and Jones.
- Simon Bell plays the part of an After Dark presenter in the 1989 film The Tall Guy.
- In 2011 Oliver Reed's appearance on After Dark featured in the BBC radio play Burning Both Ends by Matthew Broughton.
- In 2016 After Dark was the inspiration for the touring production The Destroyed Room by theatre company Vanishing Point.

== See also ==
- List of After Dark editions
- Open Media
