= List of After Dark editions =

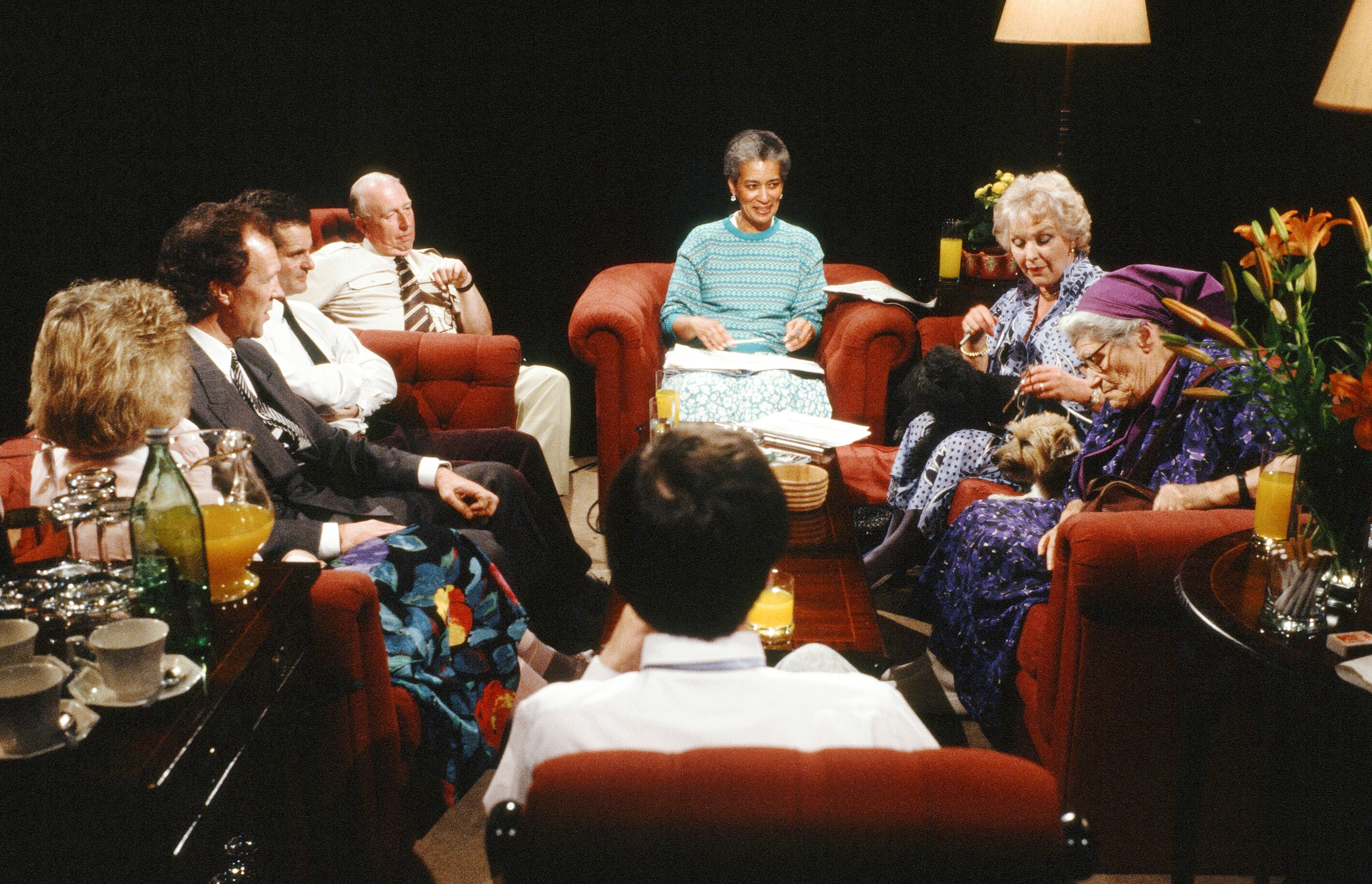
After Dark – picture shows the episode "Animal Rights" broadcast on 2 July 1988 - with that week's host Beverly Anderson (centre) were guests Katie Boyle, Rex Hudson, Ralph Cook, Miriam Rothschild, Mark Gold, Judy MacArthur and Frank Evans. Katie Boyle brought her dogs.

After Dark is a British late night television discussion programme, produced by Open Media. It was broadcast weekly on Channel 4 between 1 May 1987 and 6 April 1991, and returned with various specials between 1993 and 1997. The programme ran again weekly for a single series in 2003 on the BBC. Here follows a complete list of all editions, with dates of live transmission and the names of all guests and hosts. More detail of individual episodes is contained in this article on the production company's website.

== Series 1 ==
Date of broadcast	Title of programme	Host	Guests
1 May 1987	Secrets	Tony Wilson	Clive Ponting; Margaret Moore; Colin Wallace; T. E. Utley; Isaac Evans; Peter Hain; Anne-Marie Sandler
8 May 1987	Private Lives	Helena Kennedy	Tony Blackburn; Jeremy Black; Peter Tatchell; Sheila Kitzinger; Paul Halloran; Victoria Gillick; Johnny Edgecombe
15 May 1987	Football Crazy	Professor Anthony Clare	Terry Neill; A. J. Ayer; Chris Lightbown; Stuart Cosgrove; John Fashanu; Ian Hutchinson; Jennifer Hargreaves
22 May 1987	Do The British Love Their Children?	Chantal Cuer	John Rae; Linda Bellos; Germaine Greer; Gordon Whiteley; Russell Hoban; Diane Caw; Sarah Coomaraswamy
29 May 1987	The Mafia	John Underwood	Alex Manson; Doug Le Vien; Claire Sterling; David Mellor; David Yallop; Gaia Servadio; Bob Dick; Frank Pulley
5 June 1987	Honest, Decent and True?	Professor Anthony Clare	John Ehrlichman; Anthony Smith; Mary Midgley; Ann Burdus; Philip Bobbitt; Hugh Montefiore
12 June 1987	Is Britain Working?	Tony Wilson	David Selbourne; Teresa Gorman; Hilary Hook; Ezaz Ahmed Hayat; Adrian Lloyd; Billy Bragg; 'Helen'
26 June 1987	Killing With Care?	Professor Ian Kennedy	Charlotte Hough; Ilora Finlay; Pieter Admiraal; Lord Soper; George Cant; Maggie Davis; Vicky Clement-Jones; John Finnis
3 July 1987	Peace in Our Time	John Underwood	Edward Teller; Beatrix Campbell; Deidre Duffy; Rudolf Peierls; Enoch Powell; Sergey Kapitsa
10 July 1987	Klaus Barbie	Professor Ian Kennedy	Eli Rosenbaum; Neal Ascherson; Gena Turgel; Philippe Daudy; Paul Oestreicher; Jacques Vergès

== Series 2 ==
Date of broadcast	Title of programme	Host	Guests
19 February 1988	Beyond the Law	John Underwood	Colin Woods; Eileen Gray; Martin Short; Brian Woollard; David Napley; Ian Hunt; T. Dan Smith
26 February 1988	Marriage: What Do Women Want?	Stuart Hood	James Dearden; Carol McMillan; Julie Grant; Mary Whitehouse; Joan Wyndham; Naim Attallah; Shere Hite
4 March 1988	No Place Like Home	Helena Kennedy	Susanne Reedes; Martin Daunton; Kathy Hearne; William "Spider" Wilson; John Heddle; Sheila McKechnie; Bill More
11 March 1988	You Are What You Wear	Gaia Servadio	Brenda Polan; Bishop of Lewes; Bruce Oldfield; Nicholas Coleridge; Terry Melville; Katharine Hamnett; Raghib Ashan
18 March 1988	Licensed to Kill?	Paul Sieghart	Pauline Perry; Onora O'Neill; Michael Wiseman; Anthony Farrar-Hockley; Bridie Maguire; Arnold Dousse; Bernadette Devlin McAliskey
25 March 1988	Iran/Iraq: A Holy War?	John Underwood	Noel Pickering; Haleh Afshar; Norman Kirkham; Shusha Guppy; Ezzat Altamimi; Hoshyar Zebari; Hamid Houshangi; Dilip Hiro
9 April 1988	Horse Racing: Sport Of Kings?	Tony Wilson	Barney Curley; John McCririck; Duncan Keith; Margaret, Duchess of Argyll; General Sir Cecil "Monkey" Blacker; Alan Gibbons; Brian Radford; "Michael"
16 April 1988	What Is Prison For?	Professor Ian Kennedy	John Renton; John Masterson; Ken Murray; Terry Dicks; Tony Hoare; Yolande McShane
23 April 1988	Race and the Classroom: Education for All?	Helena Kennedy	Blake Bedford; Olna Manyan; Ray Honeyford; John Sentamu; Ann Dummett; Dipak Basu; Lurline Champagnie
30 April 1988	Bewitched, Bothered or Bewildered?	Tony Wilson	Moira Woods; Olivia Durdin-Robertson; Jack Shackleford; Jack Dover Wellman; Audrey Harper; Margot Adler; Trevor Turner
7 May 1988	Derry '68 Look Back in Anger?	Professor Ian Kennedy	Roy Bradford; Paul Brennan; Henry Kelly; DeLores Tucker; Noirin Connolly; Eamonn McCann; Glenn Barr
14 May 1988	Israel: Forty Years On	John Underwood	Yohanan Lahav; Anton Shammas; Marie Colvin; Gerald Kaufman; Moshe Amirav; Faisal Aweidah; Nadia Hijab
21 May 1988	What is Sex For?	Professor Anthony Clare	Andrea Dworkin; Anthony Burgess; Jim Haynes; Julia Ronder; Jack Dominian; Roz Kaveney
28 May 1988	Winston Churchill	Trevor Hyett	David Irving; Lord Hailsham; Anthony Montague Browne; David Reynolds; Jack Jones; Jean Howard
4 June 1988	Open to Exposure	Professor Ian Kennedy	Peter Hillmore; Lester Middlehurst; Harvey Proctor; Annette Witheridge; Laurie Manifold; Christine Keeler; Nina Myskow
11 June 1988	South Africa	Trevor Hyett	Harry Belafonte; Denis Worrall; Essop Pahad; Breyten Breytenbach; Nick Mitchell; Victoria Brittain; Ismail Ayob
18 June 1988	How Do You Survive a Murder?	Professor Anthony Clare	Lord Longford; Georgina Lawton; June Patient; Patricia Highsmith; Peter Whent; David Howden; James Nelson; Sarah Boyle
25 June 1988	Pornography	Helena Kennedy	Hanna Segal; Paula Meadows; Bill Margold; Susanne Kappeler; James Bogle; David Hebditch; "Dave"
2 July 1988	Animal Rights	Beverly Anderson	Katie Boyle; Rex Hudson; Ralph Cook; Miriam Rothschild; Mark Gold; Judy MacArthur; Frank Evans
9 July 1988	After Cleveland	Trevor Hyett	Beatrix Campbell; Shirley Edwards; Ray Wyre; A father from Cleveland; Ralph Underwager; Simon Court; "John"; Raine Roberts
16 July 1988	British Intelligence	John Underwood	Gary Murray; Alastair Mackie; Merlyn Rees; Robin Ramsay; Jock Kane; Robert Harbinson; H. Montgomery Hyde
23 July 1988	It's a Mad, Mad World?	Beverly Anderson	Errol Francis; Anne Newnham; Glynn Harrison; Sashi Sashidharan; Derek Francis; Pamela Taylor; Thomas Szasz
30 July 1988	Save the Whale, Save the World?	Roisin McAuley	Kieran Mulvaney; Heathcote Williams; Petra Kelly; James Lovelock; Tony Ball; C. W. Nicol; Shigeko Misaki
6 August 1988	Nicaragua	John Underwood	John Silber; Alfred Sherman; Roberto Ferrey; Susan Morgan; Bianca Jagger; Amalia Chomarro; Allan Francovich; John Bevan
13 August 1988	Money	Henry Kelly	Michael Lee; Owen Oyston; Michael Bassett; Nicholas van Hoogstraten; Marie Jahoda; Hannah Ward; Frances Jankowski
20 August 1988	Born to Serve?	Trevor Hyett	Peter Clarke; John Cawston; John Rentoul; Eva Figes; Doris Williams; Jessica Mitford; Pamela Hilton; Cora
27 August 1988	Sentencing	Professor Ian Kennedy	Isobel Brydie; David Napley; Sarah Helm; Michael Argyle; Peter Herbert; John Coker; Vivian Berger
3 September 1988	Alternative Medicine	Tony Wilson	Debra Freechild; Ronald Davey; James Randi; Jacques Benveniste; Erica Jones; Walter Stewart; David Reilly; Jonathan Miller
10 September 1988	Blacklist?	Professor Ian Kennedy	Harold Musgrove; Hilary Wainwright; Hugo Cornwall; Richard Norton-Taylor; George Brumwell; John Macreadie; Michael Noar; but not Gerry Adams

== Series 3 ==
Date of broadcast	Title of programme	Host	Guests
13 May 1989	Out of Bounds	John Underwood	Eddie Chapman; Tony Benn; Lord Dacre; James Rusbridger; Miles Copeland; Anthony Cavendish; Adela Gooch
20 May 1989	Football – The Final Whistle?	Jancis Robinson	Peter Garrett; Rhodes Boyson; Garth Crooks; James Delaney; Cass Pennant; Margaret Simey; John Williams; Eileen Delaney
27 May 1989	Drugs – Is Britain Cracking Up?	Professor Ian Kennedy	Blue; Robert Lefever; Nell Campbell; Terry Goddard; "Louise"; Margaret White; Allan Parry
3 June 1989	Back in the USSR?	Professor Anthony Clare	Mikki Doyle; Vladimir Bukovsky; Denis Healey; Martin Walker; Tatyana Tolstaya; Vitali Vitaliev
10 June 1989	Britain – Out on a Limb?	Beverly Anderson	Peter Ustinov; Kenneth Minogue; Shirley Williams; Richard Perle; Alastair Morton; Josef Joffe; Edward Heath
17 June 1989	Rock Bottom?	Matthew Parris	Eartha Kitt; Pauline Black; Simon Napier-Bell; Pat Kane; Imruh Bakari; Jonathan Ashby
24 June 1989	Pride and Prejudice	Beverly Anderson	Ole Espersen; Russell Watkyn; Jo Purvis; Ismond Rosen; Jennie Wilson; Martin Sherman; Ken Skeates
1 July 1989	What's Up Doc?	Tony Wilson	Ivor Daniels; Alex Comfort; James Hammond; Ian McColl; Joanna Trowell; David Widgery; Jane Rosbotham
8 July 1989	Who Dares Wins?	Professor Anthony Clare	Frederick Martens; Tony Colston-Hayter; Victor Lownes; 'Dougie'; Mary-Ann Hushlak, Bishop of Willesden; David Berglas; Al Alvarez
15 July 1989	School's Out	Matthew Parris	Robert Munks; Adae Whitcombe; Sonia Leiper; Darren Brind; Nadeem Inayat; Paula McNamara; Kieran Clifton
22 July 1989	The Cost of Divorce	Professor Ian Kennedy	Denis Cooper; Marvin Mitchelson; George MacBeth; Sue Stapely; Gill Cooper; Elizabeth Browne; George Brown
29 July 1989	What Is There To Believe In?	Tony Wilson	Lynette Burrows; Steven Rose; David Holloway; Frank Cioffi; The Bishop of Durham; Dorothy Rowe; Michael Bentine
2 September 1989	Germany – 50 Years On	Professor Anthony Clare	Amity Shlaes; Reinhard Spitzy; Albert Friedlander; Christof Wackernagel; Donald Cameron Watt; Franz Schoenhuber; Jozef Garlinski
9 September 1989	Superpowers – All In The Mind	Tony Wilson	Martin Israel; Ivy Northage; James Randi; Athena Pattengill; Stephen O'Brien; Susan Blackmore
16 September 1989	What Do We Do With Sex Offenders?	Helena Kennedy	Gerald Silverman; John Coker; Ray Wyre; 'Peter'; Maurice White; Nell McCafferty; Michael Bettsworth
23 September 1989	Freud – 50 Years On	Professor Ian Kennedy	Donald Reeves; Jeffrey Masson; Hans Lobner; Stuart Sutherland; Isabel Menzies Lyth; Ralph Steadman; Anna Raeburn
30 September 1989	Body Beautiful – What Do We Want?	Sheena McDonald	Mandy Mudd; Nabil Shaban; Dee Wells; Arthur Marwick; Molly Parkin; Zoe Warwick; Suzanne Younger
7 October 1989	Death Penalty?	Professor Anthony Clare	Sean O'Dochartaigh; Syd Dernley; Dorothea Morefield; Evelyn Ann Theobald; Peter Thornton; Michael Argyle; Guy Rais
14 October 1989	Ethiopia	John Underwood	Mark Bowden; Mary Dines; Richard Balfe; Berhane Ghebrehiwot; Rebecca Asrate; Peter Bauer; Charles Stewart; Abadi Zemo
21 October 1989	The Royal Family – Dallas or Palace?	Tony Wilson	Edgar Wilson; Andrew Morton; Archduke Karl von Habsburg; Peregrine Worsthorne; Gwyn Fitch; Peter Russell; Rhoda Koenig
28 October 1989	Men and Women: What's the Difference?	Matthew Parris	Mary Stott; Maria Scherer; Malcolm Bennett; Hans Eysenck; Helen Haste; David Stayt; Xaviera Hollander
4 November 1989	What Makes MPs Run?	Trevor Hyett	David Lewis; Ken Livingstone; Andrew Roth; 'Barbara'; Edwina Currie; Julia Langdon; Julia Stonehouse
11 November 1989	War and Peace	Professor Anthony Clare	Father Owen Hardwicke; Scilla Elworthy; Anthony Farrar-Hockley; Jean Ward; Major the Rev'd David Cooper; Wade Tidbury; Arthur Moyse
18 November 1989	Space: How Far Should We Go?	Professor Ian Kennedy	Heinz Wolff; Stephen Donnelly; Buzz Aldrin; Jocelyn Bell Burnell; Whitley Strieber; Ian Watson; Tom Wilkie
25 November 1989	Shall We Live In South Africa?	Professor Anthony Clare	Lady Bernard; Zoe Wicomb; Abdullah Ibrahim; Donald Woods; Matthew Oliphant; Shula Marks; John Nash; Mike Ramsay
1 December 1989	Terrorism	Professor Ian Kennedy	Ariel Merari; Yehudi Menuhin; Fred Holroyd; Richard Clutterbuck; Michael Opperskalski; Jillian Becker; Gordon Liddy

== Series 4 ==
Date of broadcast	Title of programme	Host	Guests
12 January 1991	Arms and the Gulf	Professor Ian Kennedy	Tam Dalyell; Bruce Hemmings; Robert Jarman; James Lunt; Joey Martyn–Martin; Adel Darwish; Rana Kabbani
19 January 1991	Survival – At What Cost?	Professor Anthony Clare	Sheila Cassidy; Richard Morefield; Brummie Stokes; Hugo Gryn; Karma Nabulsi; Monica McKibbin
26 January 1991	Do Men Have To Be Violent?	Helena Kennedy	Antoinette Giancana; Neil Lyndon; Keith Simpson; Arthur Hyatt Williams; Oliver Reed; Kate Millett; Elliott Leyton
2 February 1991	Counting The Cost of a Free Press	Helena Kennedy	Duncan Campbell; Lord Lambton; Gordon Winter; Jane Moore; Clare Short; Anthony Howard
9 February 1991	Abortion	Anthony Holden	Helen Brook; Michael Chapman; John Finnis; Wendy Savage; Alison Davis; Angela Farley; Mary Kenny
16 February 1991	Sexaholics	Kay Avila	Dirg Aab-Richards; Colin Brewer; Charlotte Davis Kasl; Corky McGuinness; Michael Seed; 'Jackie'; 'Mike'
23 February 1991	Prisons: No Way Out	Professor Ian Kennedy	Theodore Dalrymple; Paul Dolese; Sheila Heather-Hayes; Tony Lambrianou; Joe Whitty; Taki Theodoracopolous; Mary Eaton; Jim Wood
2 March 1991	The Gulf: Counting The Cost	John Plender	Adnan Al-Bahar; Chris Cowley; Edward Heath; Robert McGeehan; Lord Weidenfeld; Mona Bauwens; Adnan Khashoggi
9 March 1991	After Rochdale	Tony Wilson	Beatrix Campbell; Andy Croall; Her Honour Jean Graham Hall; Sherrill Mulhern; John Shirley; Deborah Cameron; Wendy Lindsay; Bill Thompson
16 March 1991	The Luck of the Irish?	Trevor Hyett	Father Pat Buckley; Patrick Cosgrave; J. P. Donleavy; David Norris; Emily O'Reilly; Paul Hill; Ethel Smith; Francis Stuart
23 March 1991	What Should Teachers Learn?	Professor Anthony Clare	Peter Davies; Annis Garfield; Steve McCarthy; Zoe Readhead; Catherine Finnan; James Harries; Russell Profitt; Eleanor MacDonald
31 March 1991	Who Believes In Miracles?	Tony Wilson	Ann Diamond; Prof Teddy Hall; Barbara Smoker; Matthew Fox; Tom Wright; Hyam Maccoby; Ian Wilson
6 April 1991	Serial Success?	Matthew Parris	Jeremy Coid; Stefan Jaworzyn; Detective Ray Pierce; Michael Winner; Catherine Itzin; John Sutcliffe; Helen Zahavi

== Specials ==
Date of broadcast	Title of programme	Host	Guests
7 August 1993	Bloody Bosnia	Professor Ian Kennedy	Fitzroy Maclean, Nikola Koljević, Gordana Knezević, Melanie McDonagh, Sean Gervasi, Amela, Branka Magas
30 May 1994	Brave New World	Sheena McDonald	Tom Shakespeare, Lewis Wolpert, Anthony Fisher, Adrienne Asch, Germaine Greer, Brian Richards, Robert Winston, Claire Austin
21 January 1995	Ireland: Sex & Celibacy, Church & State	Helena Kennedy	Garret FitzGerald, Gabriel Daly, Tom Stack, Eddie Humphries, Helena O'Donoghue, Emily O'Reilly, Mary Kenny, Richard Sipe, Sinéad O'Connor
17 August 1995	Lethal Justice	John Underwood	June Homer, James Grigson, Norman Parker, Norman Brennan, Hanna Segal, Don Cabana, Clive Stafford Smith
28 May 1996	The Price of Life (see Jaymee Bowen)	Professor Ian Kennedy	Roger Gould, Julian Tudor Hart, Martin Israel, Richard Nicholson, Ron Zimmern, Paige Sipes Metzler, Marion Harris
13 September 1997	After Diana	Helena Kennedy	Beatrix Campbell, Emmanuel Le Roy Ladurie, Victoria Mitford, Frank Prochaska, George Monbiot, Frank McQuerins, Claus von Bülow
1 November 1997	Abortion – Whose Choice?	John Underwood	Gerard Casey, Bernard Nathanson, John Parsons, John Harris, Josephine Barnes, Fay Weldon, Sarah Walsh

== BBC Four series ==
Date of broadcast	Title of programme	Host	Guests
22 February 2003	Iraq: What's Oil Got To Do With It?	Tony Wilson	Jonathan Aitken, Ray Leonard, Hannah Sell, Colleen Graffy, Miriam, Norah Sabri, Nabil Musawi, Robert Mabro
1 March 2003	Child Protection: How Far Should We Go?	Helena Kennedy	Esther Rantzen, Tom O'Carroll, Bill Thompson, June Taylor, Jeremy Coid, Peter Garsden, Christian Wolmar
8 March 2003	Terrorism: Who Wins?	Professor Sir Ian Kennedy	Albie Sachs, Mohammad al-Massari, Jim Swire, Silke Maier-Witt, Michael Swetnam, David Shayler
22 March 2003	Stop the War?	Sheena McDonald	Michael Randle, Lord Hannay, Alice Nutter, Ruth Wedgwood, Ken O'Keefe, Tony Robinson, Robert Fox, Daniel Mason
29 March 2003	Iraq: Truth and Lies?	John Underwood	Saad Hattar, Corinne Souza, Gerald James, David Gore-Booth, Jenny Moore, Haitham Rashid Al-Withaib, Yosri Fouda

== External sources ==
- Production company's list of all guests, hosts, programme titles and dates
