= John Underwood =

John Underwood may refer to:

- John Underwood (actor) (fl. 1600–1624), English actor
- John Underwood (PR adviser), former Director of Communications for British Labour Party
- John William Henderson Underwood (1816–1888), U.S. Representative from Georgia
- John C. Underwood (1840–1913), American civil engineer, Lieutenant Governor of Kentucky from 1875 to 1879
- John Curtiss Underwood (1809–1873), American lawyer, Abolitionist politician, and federal judge
- John Thomas Underwood (1857–1937), American entrepreneur and investor who founded the Underwood Typewriter Company
- John Underwood (American football) (1901–1932), played for the Milwaukee Badgers in the 1920s
- John W. Underwood, American aviation writer, photographer and historian.
- John Underwood (sportswriter) (1934–2023), American sportswriter and author
