= Coid =

Coid is a surname. Notable people with this surname include:

- Danny Coid (born 1981), English footballer
- Jeremy Coid, English psychiatrist
- Marshall Coid, musician that worked on several notable records
- Moses A. McCoid (1840–1904), American army officer

== See also ==
- COID, also known as the Central Oregon Irrigation District
