= Spotlight (BBC Northern Ireland TV programme) =

North Irish current affairs broadcast

- Genre: Current Affairs
- Country of origin: Northern Ireland
- Original language: English

Production
- Running time: 30–60 minutes

Original release
- Network: BBC One Northern Ireland

Spotlight is a BBC Northern Ireland weekly current affairs programme. It debuted in 1973.

The programme is aired on BBC1 Northern Ireland at 10:35pm (and sometimes early) on Tuesday evenings, with a repeat on BBC2. It is available to UK viewers outside of Northern Ireland on BBC iPlayer for a week after the programme. The format usually consists of a half-hour report presented on a rotating basis by a small number of presenters and reporters. At present, these are Mandy McAuley, Lyndsey Telford, Conor Spackman, Julian O'Neill, Stephen Dempster, Jennifer O'Leary, Alan Haslam. Occasionally, the programme consists of a studio format with various reports and panel discussions.

Spotlight is well known for its hard-hitting investigations and in 2008 won a Royal Television Society award for Mandy McAuley's dog-fighting investigation.

It has launched the careers of a number of high-profile broadcasters, including Jeremy Paxman, Alex Thomson and Gavin Esler.

== Spotlight at 40 ==
On 22 October 2013, Spotlight celebrated its 40th anniversary with an hour-long special show dubbed Spotlight at 40. The show featured interviews with Gavin Esler, Roisin McAuley, Alex Thomson and Jeremy Paxman and took a look back at the show's 40-year run including its most controversial shows.
