= American Aviation Historical Society =

The American Aviation Historical Society (AAHS) is a non-profit organization "dedicated to the preservation and dissemination of [the history of] American aviation." AAHS has had an educational program in promoting American aviation through its journal and a periodic newsletter, archives historical aviation documents and photos, maintains multiple websites on aviation history, and assists aviation historians and the public in the acquisition and exchange of aviation history information.

== Administration, organization and meetings ==
The Society was founded in 1956, and currently has two offices. Until 2017, all operations were headquartered in Huntington Beach, California. While the Membership Department remains in Huntington Beach, the headquarters office moved to the historic Flabob Airport in Riverside, California. The organization's annual meeting—open to all members—is held in California or Arizona, and commonly includes tours of some aviation historical interest.

The national organization is headquartered in the historic aviation-manufacturing region of Southern California, and conducts local activities from time to time. Additionally, there are chapters ("wings") in other parts of the United States, including Phoenix, Arizona and Northern Virginia, which conduct meetings and activities of their own. The organization lists chapters in Arizona, Florida, Michigan, Minnesota, Ohio, and Virginia. However, membership in the national organization is available to all interested parties the United States, whether served by a local chapter or not.

In the early 2000s, some chapters separated to become a separate organization. In Northern California, the San Francisco-area chapter (formed in 1985) separated in 2006 to become the Society for Aviation History, citing objections to the national organization's insurance requirements. The Dayton, Ohio region chapter ("Huffman Prairie Chapter") formed in 1990, but separated from AAHS in 2006 to become the Huffman Prairie Aviation History Society—citing objections to the national organization's demands regarding dues, officers, and meeting organization.

== Operations and media ==
=== Publications ===
AAHS's primary activity is publishing a peer-reviewed quarterly aviation history journal, the 150-page glossy AAHS Journal, distributed to members. The publication is available in both print and digital formats. The organization also produces a quarterly online newsletter, AAHS Flightline, which was originally distributed in print to members, but went online in the early 2000s, at the organization's website. The publications provide a venue for presentation of aviation history articles, historic documents and photos, and the exchange of information and resources among aviation historians.

=== Archives ===
The society also maintains an extensive library of aviation-related documents and photographs (reportedly over 2,000,000 photographs) The organization struggles to identify and catalog all the aviation and aircraft photos in its collection, and has turned to volunteers, in-person and online, to resolve a growing backlog of photographs—digitizing and documenting the photos for accessibility and usability.

=== Websites ===
AAHS has its own website (aahs-online.org), but also hosts the restored site of the U.S. Centennial of Flight Commission—a large online encyclopedia of U.S. aviation history.

It also provides links to an affiliated site, APT Collectibles, which catalogs and markets past issues of the AAHS Journal.

To help AAHS resolve its photo-identification backlog, AAHS's webmaster and managing editor, Hayden Hamilton, developed a web-based application called AAHS Planespotter, to allow scanned images to be downloaded by aviation enthusiasts, who can then fill in information to help identify the depicted aircraft by type, location, serial number or other characteristics, and then submit that information to AAHS's photo database.

=== Public service ===
AAHS is, from time to time, a venue for the exchange of information and ideas about aviation history, and a source for aviation history services. AAHS members are sometimes called upon give presentations on aviation history, to assist museums, educational institutions, or media, work in aviation history projects, programs or events, or engage in research, discussions and debates about issues of aviation history. They have provided assistance to the development of the Smithsonian Institution's National Air and Space Museum.

== Key and notable people ==
The organization's advisory board has included aviation historians Gerald Balzer, Richard P. Hallion, Robert L. Lawson, and (until 2019) Walter J. Boyne, founding curator and later director of the National Air and Space Museum.

Key AAHS Journal authors have included:

- Ray Wagner, co-founder of the AAHS; former director and enshrine of the International Air and Space Hall of Fame
- Harold E. Morehouse, co-developer of the first Aeronca airplane and pioneer developer of the modern, air-cooled, light-aircraft engine), who wrote the regular column "Flying Pioneers" profiling key early aviation pioneers (many of whom he had personally known)
- Peter M. Bowers, an EAA Homebuilders Hall of Fame enshrinee, author of 26 books and over 1,000 articles, who was a principal contributor from the initial AAHS Journal issue in 1956, through the late 1990s
- Joseph P. Juptner, EAA Hall of Fame inductee, whose book series U.S. Civil Aircraft is the principal historic catalog and encyclopedia of U.S. civilian aircraft from 1927 to 1948
- Edward H. Phillips, principal aviation historian of the general aviation industry, and the "Air Capital City" (Wichita, Kansas), and its various historic aircraft manufacturers (Cessna Aircraft, Beech Aircraft, Stearman Aircraft, Travel Air, Laird/Swallow, and others)
- Paul R. Matt, noted aviation historian, principal U.S. historical illustrator/draftsman of early aircraft
- Len Morgan, prominent aviation columnist, author and publisher
- John W. Underwood, author of 12 aviation history books, and numerous articles, and leading aviation history photographer/archivist. EAA / Vintage Aircraft Association Hall of Fame inductee

== See also ==
- List of aviation historical societies
