= Wings Over Kansas =

Wings Over Kansas.com

- Screenshot of WOK as of December 2009
- Website type: Aviation Education
- Owners: Chance Communications, Inc.
- Creators: Carl Chance and Bill Bolte
- Revenue: Advertising
- Website: http://www.wingsoverkansas.com
- Commercial: Yes
- Registration: None
- Launched: July 1998
- Current status: Active

Wings Over Kansas.com is an aviation website founded in 1998 by Carl Chance (and owned by Chance Communications, Inc.) to provide information and entertainment to aviation enthusiasts and professionals worldwide—particularly highlighting the aviation industry, activity and history of Kansas.

The web site is based in Wichita, Kansas, known as the "Air Capital of the World" due to the many aircraft manufacturers located there since 1916, and the many aircraft produced (over a quarter-million) by the city's factories.

In 2003, the site was upgraded to a data-based web site to better serve the needs of its members. "Wings Over Kansas" has grown steadily and as of 2009 draws over a quarter of a million visitors yearly from over 125 countries and all 50 states of the U.S.

== History ==
Wings Over Kansas.com was created in 1998 by Wichita native Carl Chance, a broadcast professional and producer for the Wingspan Air & Space Channel, and former vice president of KPTS-TV. In his more than thirty years of experience, Chance developed many relationships in the aviation community that have directly benefited the web site. He is a charter member and past trustee on the Kansas Aviation Museum board of directors and a former member of the Kansas Aviation Council.

From 1998 to 2003, the site underwent a number of modifications to improve its value and navigation.

In 2002, Chance developed an affiliated website, Wings Over the World, with a correspondingly broader focus It gained local notoriety when, in 2016, Chance discovered that the site's visitors were predominantly Russian.

=== 2003 Redesign ===
In January 2003, the site was redesigned by professional web developer, Bill Bolte. The new design included a data-based implementation to better serve the needs of the members including aviation professionals, educators, historians, and enthusiasts.

=== 2012-2013 Changes ===
In 2012, High Touch Technologies, in Wichita, became the site host. To expand the range of content, and for greater flexibility in features and images, the site was converted from its ASP format to a WordPress design in 2013.

== Content ==
Wings Over Kansas provides information on the entire aviation industry, but special emphasis is placed on Kansas aviation, particularly Wichita aircraft and their manufacturers, including Boeing, Hawker Beechcraft, Spirit AeroSystems, Cessna, Learjet, and Airbus. The Wings Over Kansas web site has over 1,200 pages of content. It includes the following features:

- Aerospace news headlines
- Articles on aviation history and pioneering aviators
- Information on continuing education in the aviation field
- Photo galleries and video covering military and general aviation
- Employment information related to Kansas aviation companies
- Quizzes and trivia related to aviation
- Resources to help individuals learn to fly
- Links to related aviation web sites

To encourage children in grades 3–12 to learn about aviation, the web site provides Project Classroom—a set of standardized aviation education lesson plans offered free to teachers and students. Wings Over Kansas also maintains a presence on Facebook.

== Contributing editors ==
Wings Over Kansas receives support from a diverse group of contributing editors including:

- Walter J. Boyne—aviation author and historian; former director of the Smithsonian National Air and Space Museum
- Lionel Alford, Jr.—aerospace engineer, test pilot, aviation writer/author and historian
- Edward H. Phillips—aviation author and historian; former southwest bureau chief for Aviation Week & Space Technology magazine
- Frank Joseph Rowe—aircraft designer and senior design engineer
- Gen. Paul Tibbets, USAF (ret'd), former commander, Enola Gay (the bomber that dropped the first atomic bomb over Hiroshima), and later senior USAF officer at McConnell Air Force Base overseeing development of major military aircraft at neighboring Boeing-Wichita.
- Bonnie Johnson—former director of the Aerodynamic Laboratories at Wichita State University
- Maj. George M. Boyd, USAF (ret'd), —former Tuskegee Airman, Civil Air Patrol's Kansas Wing commander, and Kansas Aviation Director
- Daryl Murphy—aviation author/historian
- Richard Harris—aviation author/historian and former Chairman of the Kansas Aviation Centennial and Wichita Aviation Centennial

== Recognition ==
In 2001, Wings Over Kansas was rated as one of the 500 best aviation-related web sites. It was also the recipient of two Golden Web and a Best of Kansas on the Web awards for outstanding presentation and content.
