= Centennial of Flight Commission =

U. S. Centennial of Flight Commission
- Formation: November 13, 1998
- Founder: 105th Congress
- Dissolved: 2004
- Type: Governmental
- Legal status: Congressional commission
- Chairperson: John R. Dailey
- Budget: $4 million USD (lifetime)
- Website: https://www.centennialofflight.net/

The U. S. Centennial of Flight Commission (CoFC or CofF Commission) was created in 1999, by the U.S. Congress, to serve as a national and international source of information about activities commemorating the centennial of the Wright brothers' first powered flight on December 17, 1903 (purportedly the first fully controlled, sustained, powered flight of a heavier-than-air man-carrying airplane).

There were centennial commemorations and celebrations planned in 2003 to occur in both:

- North Carolina (the Wrights' 1903 powered flights took place on the sands at Kitty Hawk, North Carolina)
- Dayton, Ohio, hometown of the Wright brothers

In addition, the commission anticipated numerous historical and educational projects about aviation and aeronautics nationally and internationally, and sought to be a shaping force in those events.

The Commission coordinated a national outreach campaign, "Centennial of Flight: Born of Dreams — Inspired by Freedom," "to commemorate the 100th anniversary of the Wright brothers’ first powered flight and the century of accomplishments that followed." The Commission also advised the President, Congress and federal agencies on the most effective ways to encourage and promote national and international participation in the commemoration. The CoFC also undertook additional efforts to support Centennial commemorations and celebrations, and related educational and cultural programs, through its alliance with "Centennial Partners" who were "planning everything from cross-country tours to air shows and exhibitions, seminars and television specials." It also sponsored a large educational Centennial website.

== Authorization and mission ==
In 1998, the United States Congress passed the Centennial of Flight Commemoration Act, Public Law 105–389, 105th Congress (November 13, 1998), as amended by Public Law 106–68, 106th Congress (Oct. 6, 1999).

Regulations for the commission were incorporated into the Code of Federal Regulations as "67 FR 758 - U_S_ Centennial of Flight Commission."

The commission had limited authority and resources, and was chiefly charged by Congress to play the leading role in coordinating and publicizing activities celebrating the achievements of Wilbur and Orville Wright and commemorate a century of powered flight.

The commission's primary responsibilities were:

- To generate publicity for the celebration
- To encourage individuals and organizations across the country to conduct commemorative activities
- To give advice and recommendations to individuals and organizations conducting commemorative activities
- To maintain a Web site and a national calendar of events
- To send representatives to international meetings
- To maintain a speakers bureau
- To supervise staff operations
- To sponsor meetings

== Funding ==
Congressional appropriations totaled $4 million USD (equivalent to $7,901,184 in 2025) over the committee's lifespan. From FY1999 through FY2001, the commission was funded through specific line-items in the Federal Aviation Administration operations appropriations. In subsequent years, the commission was funded through general agency appropriations. The Centennial of Flight Commission, are provided with the authority to accept only nonmonetary donations. In this instance, the statutory language stated: "The Commission may accept donations of personal services and historic materials relating to the implementation of its responsibilities under the provisions of this Act."

== Members and participants ==
The Commission consisted of representatives of public and private American organizations, including:

- Commission Chair: General John R. Dailey, Director. Smithsonian National Air and Space Museum
- Marion Blakey, Administrator, Federal Aviation Administration (FAA)
- Sean O'Keefe, Administrator, National Aeronautics and Space Administration (NASA)
- Richard T. Howard, President, First Flight Centennial Foundation
- Tom Poberezny, President and CEO, EAA Aviation Foundation, affiliate of the Experimental Aircraft Association (EAA)
- J. Bradford Tillson, chair, Inventing Flight

The affiliated First Flight Centennial Federal Advisory Board was made up of various aviation dignitaries and public figures appointed by the President or the Congress, or designated by statute.

CofC later added numerous affiliates, including:

- The First Flight Centennial Commission of North Carolina (FFCC), to focus on Centennial events in North Carolina
- The Oklahoma Centennial of Flight Commission of Oklahoma City, Oklahoma, "to promote aviation activities throughout the state, establish and promote educational activities relating to Oklahoma’s aviation history, and celebrate a century of aviation."
- Crown Agents Stamp Bureau, of Surrey, England, "to create a collection of official postage stamps featuring civilian and military aircraft of the last 100 years."
- The Space Day Foundation, for space-related education and academic motivation, particularly through "Space Day" (SM), a large "grassroots educational initiative" reportedly "reaching thousands of teachers and millions of students in the United States, Canada and beyond." The 2003 Space Day theme was "Space Day 2003SM: Celebrating the Future of Flight," to complement the efforts of CoFC to encourage enthusiasm for flight and innovation among young people.
- The Challenger Center—which uses space as a theme to excite, inspire and encourage students in the study of mathematics and science, and the application of technology. CofC's alliance was to have the Challenger Center, via Space Day 2003 (SM), challenge students, in grades four through eight, "to design and build models of aircraft using the ingenuity and creativity of the Wrights as inspiration."
- The Aviation Foundation of America, Inc., to sponsor the re-creation of the National Air Tours of the 1920s and 1930s—with dozens of vintage aircraft to fly the 1932 National Air Tour route that had been planned, but was never flown, around the U.S. heartland.
- The Chicago Centennial of Flight Commission (CCFC) organized by a group of aviation industry organizations from the Chicago area, and the Great Lakes region, to promote aviation awareness using public exhibits. It planned centennial activities including a model-airplane exhibit, at Chicago's Museum of Science and Industry, in 2003, from May to September, titled Chicago Centennial of Flight: 100 History-Making Aircraft, plus "events and symposia throughout 2003," with hopes of also producing programs promoting aviation education for elementary and secondary school students.

== Programs and events ==
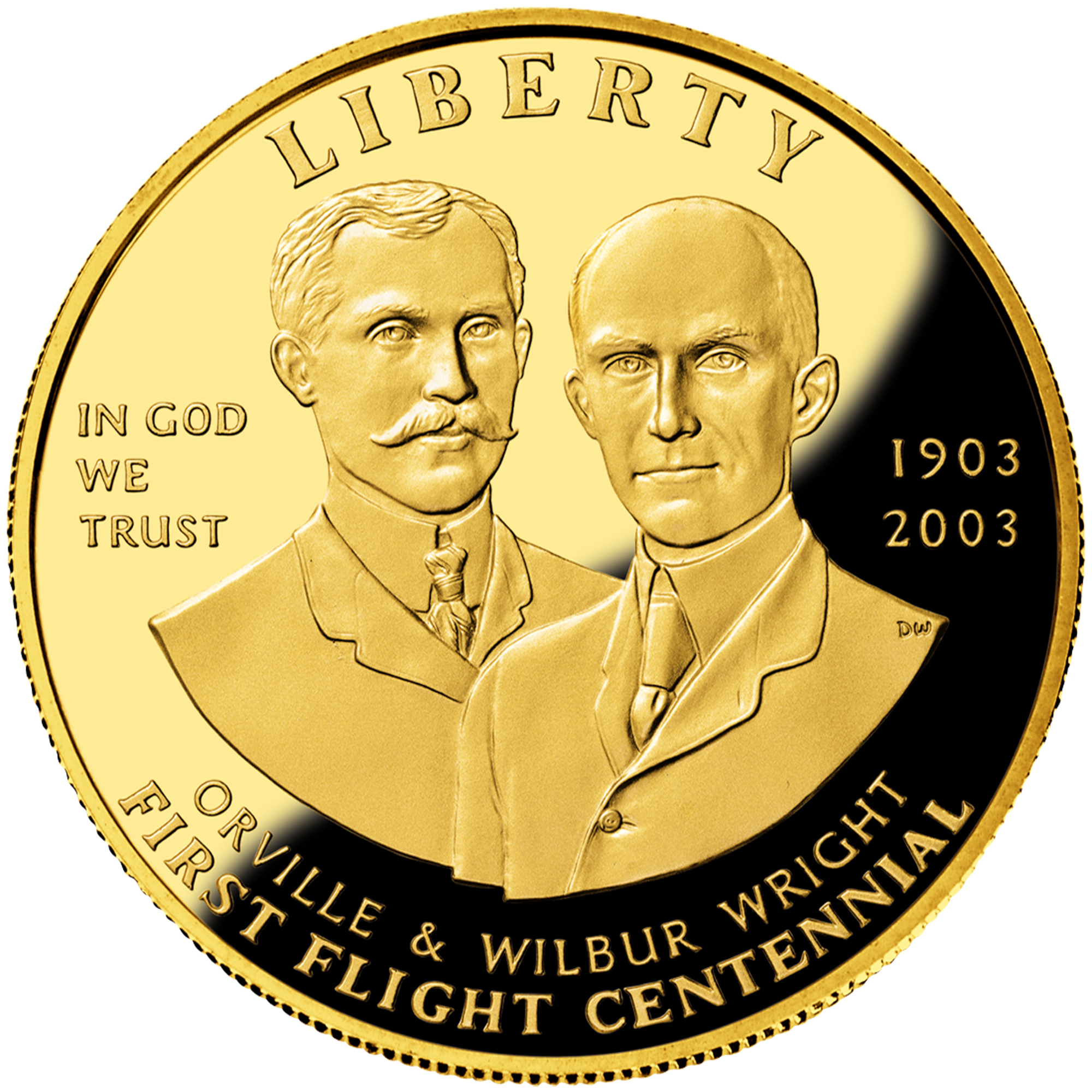
"First in Flight" centennial commemorative $10 gold coin

In addition to the programs and events noted in the #Members and Participants section, the CoFC was involved with numerous other activities.

The National Centennial of Flight Kick-off event, was held December 17, 2002—a year before the 100th anniversary of the Wright flight—at the Smithsonian Institution's National Air and Space Museum, in Washington, D.C. It included a Presidential proclamation and the recognition of numerous aviation and aerospace pioneers, with presentations from Chairman Dailey, actor/aviator John Travolta, FAA Administrator Marion Blakey, and NASA Administrator Sean O'Keefe. On the same day, in North Carolina, a commemoration was held near Kitty Hawk—a daylong anniversary tribute at the site of the Wrights' first flight, the Wright Brothers National Memorial, at Kill Devil Hills. Speakers included North Carolina Governor Michael F. Easley and U.S. Air Force Gen. Ralph E. Eberhart, commander of North American Aerospace Defense Command and U.S. Northern Command.

Numerous other commemoration events, and related projects, were urged, planned or supported throughout the nation, throughout the "centennial year" (December 17, 2002 to December 17, 2003), particularly in Ohio and North Carolina.

The principal, and grand finale, First Flight Centennial Celebration was held December 12–17, 2003, at the Wright Brothers National Memorial at the approximate site of their first powered flight at Kill Devil Hills, North Carolina. President George W. Bush was present, and numerous military and civilian aircraft performed. The event was marred by foul weather, and failed attempts to fly a replica of the 1903 Wright Flyer. Development of the event reportedly had been hindered by interagency difficulty and conflict, and mismanagement, including North Carolina's FFCC.

== Website ==
One of the Centennial of Flight Commission's principal efforts was the development of the organization's Centennial of Flight website, a 17,000-page online encyclopedia of aviation history (chiefly U.S. aviation history), with hundreds of articles, and thousands of illustrations. The Commission claimed the website provided "the most up-to-date information on celebration activity, as well as the most comprehensive collection of outstanding educational essays, multimedia and links regarding the history of flight."

The site's development and operation consumed about four million dollars, of mostly federal funds, but the site became very popular during the Centennial year, peaking at over 4 million visitors per month by December 2003 (the 100th anniversary month).

The site was maintained at the internet domain centennialofflight.gov by NASA. Following the closing of the CoFC in April 2004, responsibility for the site transferred to the NASA History Office, who maintained the site online, basically unchanged, until budget cutbacks and server-computer problems motivated its abandonment by NASA in September 2012. Various parties salvaged parts of the site, including the American Aviation Historical Society (AAHS), who acquired copies of the computer code for the site from NASA. In 2013, a member of AAHS donated the domain name centennialofflight.net to AAHS, to accommodate an archive—maintained by AAHS—of the original official Centennial of Flight website. AAHS made structural "clean-ups" to the site (removing broken links and obsolete calendar data), and initiating other edits, highlighted with dark red lettering.

== Termination ==
The Commission closed in 2004, following the end of its scheduled functions. As part of the commission's charter, there were provisions for certain material to be preserved, particularly the large website, which was assigned to the NASA History Office.
