= R (B) v Cambridge Health Authority =

Judicial review and enterprise law case

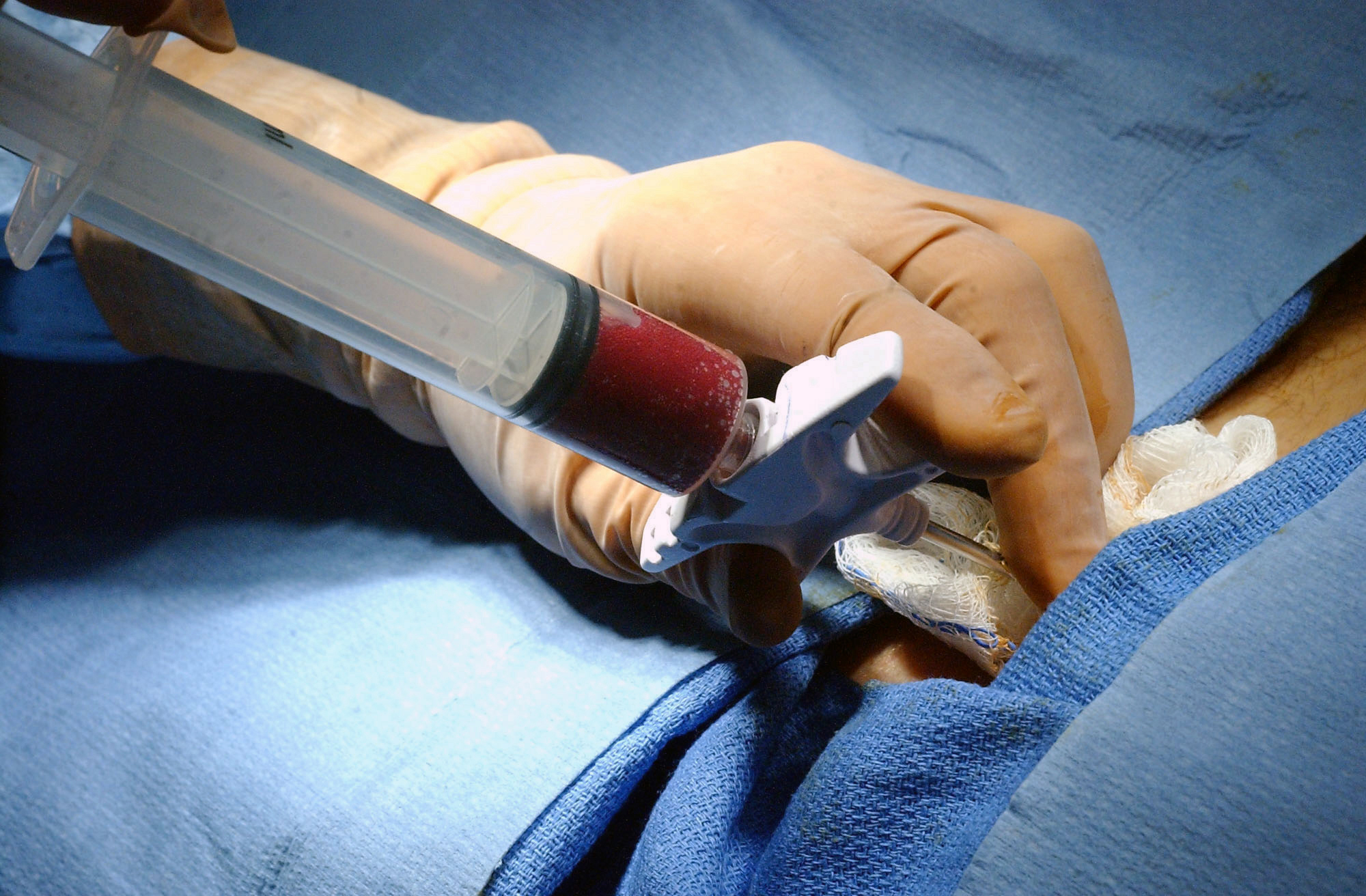
- Bone marrow biopsy
- Court: Court of Appeal

Keywords
- Health, bone marrow

R (B) v Cambridge Health Authority [1995] EWCA Civ 43 is a UK judicial review and enterprise law case, concerning health care in the UK.

== Facts ==
The parents of a child named Jaymee Bowen claimed that she should receive chemotherapy and a second bone marrow transplant for their 10 year old's acute myeloid leukaemia. Consultants at Addenbrooke's Hospital, Cambridge, and Royal Marsden Hospital in London thought it would not succeed. Treatment in the United States would have been far too expensive. One doctor in Hammersmith would have treated her for £75,000. The doctors believed it would be ineffective and inappropriate.

== Judgment ==
=== High Court ===
Laws J held the doctors should have to "do more than toll the bell of tight resources. They must explain the priorities that have led them to decline to fund the treatment."

=== Court of Appeal ===
Sir Thomas Bingham MR held, the same day, the Health Authority had acted rationally and fairly and intervention would be misguided.

I have no doubt that in a perfect world any treatment which a patient, or a patient's family, sought would be provided if doctors were willing to give it, no matter how much it cost, particularly when a life was potentially at stake. It would however, in my view, be shutting one's eyes to the real world if the court were to proceed on the basis that we do live in such a world. It is common knowledge that health authorities of all kinds are constantly pressed to make ends meet. They cannot pay their nurses as much as they would like; they cannot provide all the treatments they would like; they cannot purchase all the extremely expensive medical equipment they would like; they cannot carry out all the research they would like; they cannot build all the hospitals and specialist units they would like. Difficult and agonising judgments have to be made as to how a limited budget is best allocated to the maximum advantage of the maximum number of patients. That is not a judgment which the court can make. In my judgment, it is not something that a health authority such as this Authority can be fairly criticised for not advancing before the court.

== Significance ==
After the Court of Appeal judgment, The Sun said the child was "Condemned by Bank Balance" and the Daily Mail said the child was "Sentenced to Death". An anonymous private donor paid for treatment. The consultant who had agreed changed tack, did not provide a second bone marrow transplant, and did an experimental treatment called donor lymphocyte infusion. Jaymee died after a few months.

The funeral of Jaymee Bowen was held on 28 May 1996. That evening Channel 4 cancelled its scheduled late-night programmes to enable the TV discussion After Dark to debate the issues of the case, with among others Julian Tudor Hart, Martin Israel and the NHS Director of Public Health who had turned down Jaymee's family when they asked for further treatment.

== See also ==
- United Kingdom enterprise law
