= David Jenkins (bishop) =

Bishop of Durham from 1984 to 1994

The Right Reverend David Jenkins
- Bishop of Durham
- Diocese: Durham
- In office: 1984–1994
- Predecessor: John Habgood
- Successor: Michael Turnbull
- Other posts: Honorary assistant bishop in Ripon (1994–2016) professor at University of Leeds (1979–1984)

Orders
- Consecration: 6 July 1984

Personal details
- Born: 26 January 1925 Bromley, Kent, England
- Died: 4 September 2016 (aged 91)
- Denomination: Anglican
- Spouse: Stella Mary (Molly) Peet (m. 1949; died 2008)
- Children: 4
- Profession: Theologian
- Education: The Queen's College, Oxford

David Edward Jenkins (26 January 1925 – 4 September 2016) was a Church of England cleric and theologian. He was Bishop of Durham from 1984 until 1994. After his retirement, he continued to serve as an honorary assistant bishop in the Diocese of Ripon and Leeds.

== Early life ==
Jenkins was born in Bromley, Kent, to Lionel Jenkins, who worked in a bank, and his wife Dora (née Page). His family were Methodist. He was educated at St Dunstan's College, Catford. Having attended a Church of England ordination conference at Bangalore during his service in India, he took up a scholarship to enter Queen's College, Oxford, where he graduated in 1954.

During the Second World War, he was called up in the autumn of 1943. He was commissioned in the Royal Artillery after officer training at Harrogate in April 1945. At the end of the war he was a staff officer at General Headquarters in India. In 1946 he was attached to the 10th Indian Field Regiment, Royal Indian Artillery before its disbandment. He demobilised as a captain in 1947.

== Ordained ministry ==
Jenkins trained for ordination at Lincoln Theological College. He was ordained in the Church of England as a deacon in 1953, and as a priest in 1954 by the Bishop of Birmingham. He served as curate at St Philip's Cathedral, Birmingham.

He was chaplain and Fellow of Queen's College, Oxford (1954–1969), and a lecturer in theology at the University of Oxford (1955–1969). He also worked for the World Council of Churches and the William Temple Foundation. He was appointed Professor of Theology at the University of Leeds in 1979, and was made Emeritus Professor when he left Leeds in 1984. In addition to his teaching appointments Jenkins had been Examining Chaplain to the Bishops of Lichfield (1956–69), Newcastle upon Tyne (1957–69), Bristol (1958–84), Wakefield (1978–84) and Bradford (1979–84).

== Bishop of Durham ==
His selection as Bishop of Durham was controversial due to allegations that he held heterodox beliefs, particularly regarding the virgin birth and the bodily resurrection. Between his selection and consecration, he said in an interview: "I wouldn't put it past God to arrange a virgin birth if he wanted. But I don't think he did." His widely quoted comment about the resurrection of Christ being "just a conjuring trick with bones" is a misrepresentation; his actual words as recorded on television say the reverse: the resurrection is not a conjuring trick with bones. The original line appears to have been "[the Resurrection] is real. That's the point. All I said was 'literally physical'. I was very careful in the use of language. After all, a conjuring trick with bones proves only that somebody's very clever at a conjuring trick with bones." According to his BBC obituary, he considered "the resurrection was not a single event, but a series of experiences that gradually convinced people that Jesus's life, power, purpose and personality were actually continuing."

Nonetheless, Jenkins' public pronouncements caused great disquiet, particularly within his own diocese. As a result of doubts concerning his elevation to bishop, a petition signed by more than 12,000 people was submitted to the Archbishop of York.

Three days after his consecration as bishop on 6 July 1984, York Minster was struck by lightning, resulting in a disastrous fire which some interpreted as a sign of divine wrath at Jenkins's appointment.

As a bishop, Jenkins was known for his willingness to speak his mind. In 1989 he made an extended appearance on the television discussion programme After Dark, alongside among others Steven Rose, Frank Cioffi, Dorothy Rowe and Michael Bentine.

After leaving office in 1994 he continued to voice his opinions, such as in a BBC interview in 2003.

== Political views ==
Jenkins also became identified with opposition to the policies of the Thatcher and Major governments and subsequently was a critic of New Labour. He argued that what these governments shared was a dogmatic faith in the market which had many pseudo-religious elements to it. This led him to write at length about what he saw as the intellectual deficiencies of economic theory and market theorising and its pseudo-theological character.

His book Market Whys and Human Wherefores: Thinking Again About Markets, Politics, and People was an extended layman's critique of economic theory and its application to policy, in which he described himself as an 'anxious idiot' using the latter term in its original meaning of an ordinary person with no professional expertise. It nevertheless diagnosed many of the problems with economic theory and its application to a deregulated economy that would later be seen as prescient in the light of the global economic crisis of 2007 onwards. In Dilemmas of Freedom, he also challenged the idea that markets created freedom. In Price, Cost, Excellence and Worth: Can the idea of a university survive the force of the market? he similarly questioned whether they were compatible with the idea of a university while in The Market and Health Care, he addressed the issue of health care in a similar vein.

== Controversies ==
In 2005, he became one of the first clerics in the Church of England to participate to the public blessing of a civil partnership between two homosexual men, one of whom was a Church of England priest.

In 2006, Jenkins was banned from preaching in some of his local churches after reportedly "swearing" in a sermon, using the words "bloody" and "damn". In 2002 he published his memoir The Calling of a Cuckoo: Not Quite an Autobiography.

== Personal life ==
In 1949, Jenkins married Stella Mary Peet, known as Mollie. She died in 2008. The couple had two sons and two daughters. His daughter Rebecca was his assistant and PR officer while he was the Bishop of Durham. Jenkins died on 4 September 2016 at the age of 91.

== Selected works ==
He wrote numerous books on Christian theology which include:

- Guide to the debate about God original edition 1966 (2nd ed. Cambridge; Cambridgeshire: Lutterworth Press, 1985.)
- The glory of man, London: SCM Press, 1967
- Living with questions Investigations into the theory and practice of belief in God, London: SCM Press, 1969
- What is Man, London: SCM Press 1970, 1985
- The contradiction of Christianity, London: S.C.M. Press, 1976 (based on the Edward Cadbury Lectures given at the University of Birmingham in 1974)
- The God of freedom and the freedom of God, London: The Hibbert Trust
- God, miracle and the Church of England London: SCM, 1987 ISBN 9780334020356
- God, Jesus and life in the spirit London: SCM Press, 1988
- God, politics and the future, London: SCM Press 1988 ISBN 9780334020202
- Still living with questions, London: SCM, 1990 ISBN 9780334024392
- (with Rebecca Jenkins) Free to Believe, London: BBC Books, 1991.
- The Calling of a Cuckoo: Not Quite an Autobiography (Bloomsbury Academic, 2001) ISBN 9780826449917

He also gave the Bampton Lectures on the Incarnation at Oxford.

== See also ==
- Anglican views of homosexuality
