= York Minster fire =

1984 fire in York Minster, England

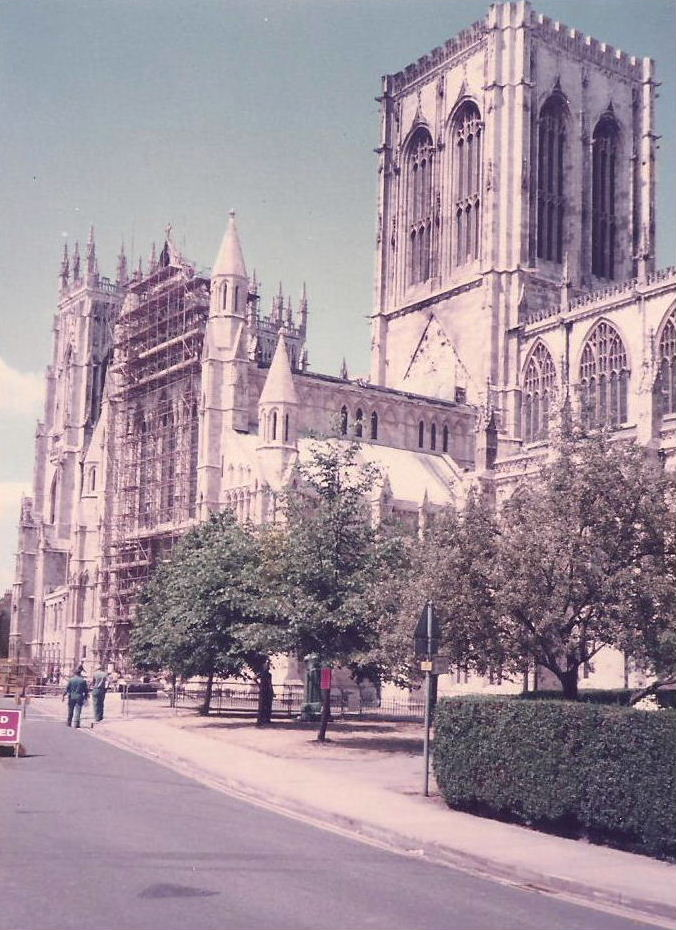
- York Minster after 1984 fire
- Date: 9 July 1984
- Time: 1:00 am (fire started) (UTC); 2:30 am (discovered) (UTC)
- Location: York, England; 53.962°N 1.081°W
- Type: Fire
- Cause: Lightning strike
- Outcome: Destruction of south transept roof
- Deaths: 0

The York Minster fire was a blaze that caused severe destruction to the south transept of York Minster, in the city of York, England, on 9 July 1984. Believed to have been started by a lightning strike, the roof burnt for three hours between 1:00 and 4:00 am before it was made to collapse by the fire brigade to stop it spreading to other parts of the minster. It took over £2.25 million to repair the damage, and a rededication ceremony was held in October 1988.

== Background ==
York Minster is a major landmark within the City of York and is considered to be one of Europe's finest Gothic buildings. The building is a significant tourist attraction for York, having over 706,000 people visiting in 2019 (numbers lessened in 2020 due to the effects of the COVID-19 lockdowns). The minster at York has been beset by five fires:

- In 1753, a fire in the south transept was blamed on workmen burning coals
- In 1829, Jonathan Martin set fire to the choir using torn up hymnbooks and kindling made from the pews
- In 1840, a fire broke out in the south nave roof after a candle had been left unattended
- In 1971, a fire broke out in the north-west tower when a tarpaulin caught fire
- In 1984, the roof of the south transept was destroyed in a fire most likely caused by a lightning strike

Although originally a Norman structure, all of the above ground building has been built since Norman times, and the roof has been renovated and strengthened over the intervening centuries.

== Fire ==
On the morning of 9 July 1984, the fire control room at Northallerton received a phone call from York Minster at 2:30 am stating that the roof of the building was on fire. When the fire brigade (Note: At that time, the fire service in the city was called the City of York Fire Brigade.) first arrived, they found staff from the minster running into and out of the burning building with wetted handkerchiefs over the faces. They were trying to save valuable items - books of remembrance, candlesticks, altar cloths - from the region of the fire. The fire brigade had difficulties fighting the fire because of the height of the roof and problems accessing the roof space. Firefighters wearing breathing apparatus were detailed to climb the spiral staircase to try and access the roof, carrying ropes which would enable them to haul hoses to the roof section. However, they could not get to the roof due to the heat and locked doors, so external ladders were used instead.

The intense heat caused the glass in the Rose Window to crack into 40,000 pieces. The window was installed in the 15th century after the Wars of the Roses, (Note: The window was created to celebrate the marriage of Henry VII and Margaret of York, unifying the houses of Lancaster and York at the end of the War of the Roses.) but had been renovated in the months leading up to the fire, and the lead edges held the pieces together, so no glass was lost. Firefighters used a 100 feet (30 m) ladder to douse the Rose Window with water. Flames were reported to have reached almost 200 feet (61 m) in the air, and sparks showering the area resulted in those living in the immediate vicinity to be evacuated.

At one point, over 120 firefighters were at the site dealing with the blaze, along with 20 pumps and three turntable ladders, from stations across the neighbouring brigade of North Yorkshire as far apart as Scarborough, Harrogate and Selby. The firefighters were fighting the blaze for over four hours and had to lay hose lines to the River Ouse for a sufficient water supply. With the roof of the south transept well alight, the fire service had to consider what to do to protect the rest of the minster; the prevailing wind was blowing the fire towards the rest of the cathedral. A decision was made to pull the remaining roof structure down to make a fire break and stop the fire spreading to the tower. The fire brigade used jets of water to pull the roof down, this was logged as being achieved at 4:00 am. The firefighters who were trying to extinguish the fire from the roof space reported an odd sensation of the floor moving underneath their feet as the roof timbers slipped down to the ground, often helped by the molten lead which had been used as a roof covering. The fire was declared under control by 5:54 am, however, firefighters remained on site damping down (Note: Damping down is described as "extinguishing a fire completely once it has been brought under control, to prevent escape or reignition.") for a period of 24 hours.

== Investigation ==
Whilst the investigation proposed the cause to be lightning striking the south transept roof, some believed the cause to be God's retribution for employing the Right Reverend David Jenkins as the Bishop of Durham a few days before the fire. Jenkins' appointment caused some controversy regarding his comments on the New Testament of the Bible. The Archbishop of York dismissed the notion of this retribution as "ridiculous". Another theory was that the fire was started deliberately due to someone protesting over Jenkins' appointment by the then Archbishop of York, John Habgood.

The most likely explanation, that of a lightning strike, was accepted to be the cause, and a storm with light rain had occurred over the Minster during the night of the 8 and 9 July 1984. It is thought that the fire burned for 90 minutes before detection, making the start time around 1:00 am on 9 July. Consideration had been given to the idea of arson, but the roof space where the fire started was difficult to get into and the last member of the public in the vicinity left that part of the minster at 7:30 pm the evening before (some five-and-a-half hours before the predicted start of the fire). The fire brigade report concluded that lightning was most likely the cause ("80% probable"), with both arson and an electrical fault being given a 10% chance each.

== Reconstruction ==
York Minster 1984 schematic

By the morning after the fire, the debris lay on the south transept floor to a depth of 5 feet (1.5 m). Although in a ruinous state, the collapse of the otherwise cramped roof and vault area allowed for the first detailed archaeological study for some time, and each charred timber was measured, catalogued and kept in storage.

Within three weeks of the blaze, all the charred masonry and timber had been cleared, and temporary roof of aluminium and plastic sheeting had been installed to allow renovation work to continue in dry conditions, and to prevent the inner walls from suffering water damage from rain. A secondary roof was installed later that was set on rails and could move out and stack on itself in sections, this allowed a crane set at the eastern side of the south transept to manoeuvre items in and out through the roofspace. A request was soon issued for tall oak trees to be felled to be used in rebuilding the destroyed parts of the minster. One such tree was the Ferrands Oak from the St Ives estate in West Yorkshire. The tree was over 80 feet (24 m) tall and 250-years old. New bosses had to be designed and created to support the oak ribs for the south transept roof (only six of the original bosses could be saved) and six of these were designed by children through a campaign by the TV programme Blue Peter.

Work on the minster was paid for through the insurance cover (the Ecclesiastical Insurance Fund), whilst public donations of up to £500,000 (equivalent to £1,493,000 in 2025), paid for an upgraded lightning conductor system.

A rededication ceremony took place in October 1988 in the presence of the Queen. The reconstruction of the damaged areas cost over £2.25 million (equivalent to £6,264,000 in 2025). On the 30th anniversary of the fire in 2014, some of the charred bosses with original gilt-work, and the Medieval timbers were auctioned off with all money raised being used in future works at the cathedral.

== See also ==
- 1992 Windsor Castle fire
