= Ken Murray (prison officer) =

British prison officer & reformer (1931–2007)

Ken Murray (24 April 1931 – 2 October 2007) was a reforming prison officer in Scotland during the last third of the twentieth century.

He was educated at Inverness Technical High School. He worked as a Coachbuilder until his late twenties when he joined the Scottish Prison Service. His most notable achievement was the creation of the special unit of Barlinnie Prison which housed some of the most violent prisoners in the system, including Jimmy Boyle. The unit was based on treating both staff and prisoners as part of a community in which all had a voice in making decisions and setting programmes.

In 1988 he made an extended appearance on the Channel 4 television discussion programme After Dark alongside, among others, Terry Dicks MP (more details here).
