= Gordon Baxter =

American aviator

Gordon Baxter (December 25, 1923 – June 11, 2005), nicknamed Bax, was a well-known Texas radio personality, an author of books and a columnist for newspapers and magazines. He was a lifelong resident of Southeast Texas, having grown up in Port Arthur where he was born.

He lived near Beaumont during most of his professional years and was probably best known locally as a radio heartland humorist in the Jean Shepherd tradition. He was also known nationally to several generations of pilots who read his columns on the joys of flying in the aviation magazine, Flying.

Baxter was entranced by aviation from childhood. At the age of ten, he paid "a 1933 fortune" of five dollars for his first airplane ride in a Curtiss Condor and was hooked on flying. Despite a slow start in the cockpit and as a writer, by the end of his writing career he had spent more than 25 years with Flying, written 13 books and contributed to a Microsoft CD-ROM title, World of Flight.

During World War II, Baxter joined the Army Air Corps, hoping to be a pilot. Baxter himself noted that his ruination as a military pilot was predicted in high school by a math teacher who told Gordon that he spent too much time dreaming and drawing airplanes and not enough time studying. In the Army Air Corps, he trained in a Stearman. He entered the Merchant Marine as an officer, but after his ship was sunk in the South Pacific, he became a turret gunner in B-17s. Once there, he became a sharpshooter in every turret position. It was only after World War II that he succeeded in soloing in a Luscombe, eventually becoming an active pilot in the late 1950s.

== Radio ==
After the war he initially worked as a Mississippi River boatman, then became a familiar voice on Port Arthur and Beaumont radio stations. His afternoon show of the 1950s attracted many young listeners as Baxter unleashed wild humor between novelty and satire recordings, sometimes leaving the studio for shows on location. As his radio fame increased, he often was invited to emcee at shows and events throughout East Texas. Bill Lambright recalled Baxter's radio antics:

I had the thrill of listening to Barefoot Bathless Baxter (as we called him in the 40s, 50s, 60s) on the radio in Port Arthur, Texas, where we both were born. Bax was 20+ years my senior, but his childlike joys of flight and homespun humor spoke to me as a kid as well as all in his radio audience listening to KPAC, the voice of Port Arthur College. If I need a good laugh today or touch of home, I read Bax!

Before Bax was an aviator though he was a sailor in the US Merchant Marine. He could identify ships by the patterns of their smokestacks as they sailed down the Intercoastal Canal, which he could see from KPAC's control room. I traveled the world in my mind as he described his adventures on the high seas. When I was in the Navy, I'd spend at least several hours of my furlough time watching Baxter perform on the radio. He would spin records with his bare feet. His commercials were as entertaining as the music and other antics he would pull. Believe me, he had to mature a lot to master the techniques of flying a plane or maybe he flew his Mooney barefoot. I don't know. I followed him on the radio as he learned to fly his first airplane. I wish those programs had been recorded. They would be priceless, but those were the days before audio tape.

== Wild blue yonder ==
Baxter also contributed to weekly newspapers in Texas. In 1970, he was discovered by the senior editor for Flying, who had been in town for a Rotary Club speech. Baxter's discovery came because he pushed into editor Archie Trammell's hands three articles about flying, each originally published in the Kountze, Texas weekly newspaper. Those three articles, "Houn Dog", "Cross City" and "The Wide Job" were the first three Bax Seat columns. His shortest column, published in 1973, reflects the humor present in all of his writing:

Naked City Airport, Indiana. Turf strip overrun with parked cars of a crowd of 7,000 who came to view 50 naked girls vying for title of Miss Nude America, and four naked parachute jumpers. Unable to obtain other data, notebook was with my clothes.

== Village Creek ==

He and his second wife, Diane, lived in Village Creek, near Beaumont. His book, Village Creek, was reviewed by Kirkus Reviews in 1979:

Thirty years an East Texas disk jockey, a columnist, pilot and public character, Baxter writes like it isn't any trouble, like he was just spilling over, as he tells about himself from a Depression childhood, a wartime bout in the Merchant Marine, and on up. Up leads him through a midlife crisis and out into the sunshine of a cabin on Village Creek, near Beaumont, and a loving new wife some 20 years his junior but his equal in backbone. Baxter, affectingly, doesn't blur either her intense individuality or his own; nor does he pretend that things are always easy between them. He also admits his guilt at having left a good woman who bore him eight children he never really had time for. Baxter can ramble--as any deejay will--and sometimes he falls into a neat little essay that could have been left out, or soars into highfalutin' rhetoric with a veneer of folksiness. But mostly he sounds like the guy on the next barstool, only a whole lot funnier. At his best, he'll tell you about his cat Pearl, a lady with too-frequent litters, and her son Fleetwood Keats, the Houston Cadillac dealer tomcat; about his new baby and his helpful neighbors; or about daily life on a creek that periodically floods his property nearly to the living room rug. Baxter obviously likes to get his feet wet and leave his damp tracks around for all to see--as in this lively, likable book.

His writing was so vivid that Flying started an annual Bax Seat Trophy in 1999 for the most-inspiring aviation writing. His character and attitude towards flying were reflected in his Flying editor's comments in the preface to the book Bax Seat, published in 1978, "Bax tries to pass himself off as a pilot, but don’t believe him. He never could fly worth a damn. But Gordon feels airplanes, loves and honors them in ways the rest of us are ashamed to admit."

Among his many accomplishments was his acting debut in filmmaker J. D. Feigelson's One of the Missing for PBS. Based on an Ambrose Bierce short story, Baxter plays the lead role of Confederate Sharpshooter Jerome Searing. The show aired in the spring of 1979 to high praise from the critics. Judith Crist called it "trenchant." Ray Bradbury said it was "extraordinary." It was repeated in 2004 with Charles Durning as host and has been the recipient of numerous awards. He was also a semi-regular contributor to "Car and Driver" magazine in the early to mid-1980s, writing about his equal love of vintage cars, hot rods and other auto-related stories.

Though Baxter was always hanging around airplanes and writing about them when he was not at the airport, it was not until 1957 that he got his private pilots license, and only in the 1970s, when he started becoming visible with his Flying column, that the magazine's editors pushed him into upgrading his flying skills. At that point, Baxter added a multi-engine rating, then commercial, glider and seaplane ratings. Finally, Baxter tackled the instrument rating. The chaos of pursuing the instrument rating produced yet another column and one of his best-known quotations opened that column: "Instrument flying, I had concluded, is an unnatural act, probably punishable by God."

== Death ==
Baxter died at age 81, leaving behind nine children and 16 grandchildren. He is buried at Greenlawn Memorial Park in Groves, Texas. He is a 2007 inductee into the Texas Radio Hall of Fame.

== Bibliography ==

- The Best of Bax, 1965
- Are You Ready for Your Morning Report?, 1968
- Bax Seat: Log of a Pasture Pilot, 1978
- Bax & Car & Driver: The Best of Gordon Baxter, 1989
- More Bax Seat: New Logs of a Pasture Pilot
- How to Fly
- Jenny n’ Dad: The Love Story of a Very Young Daughter and a Very Old Dad
- The Al Mooney Story: They All Fly Through the Same Air (co-authored with Al Mooney), 1985
- Village Creek
- The World of Flight, Microsoft CD-ROM, 1995 (contributor)

== Listen to ==
- Gordon Baxter (plus Jim Baxter on his father)
