= Dorothy Rowe (psychologist) =

Australian psychologist and author (1930–2019)

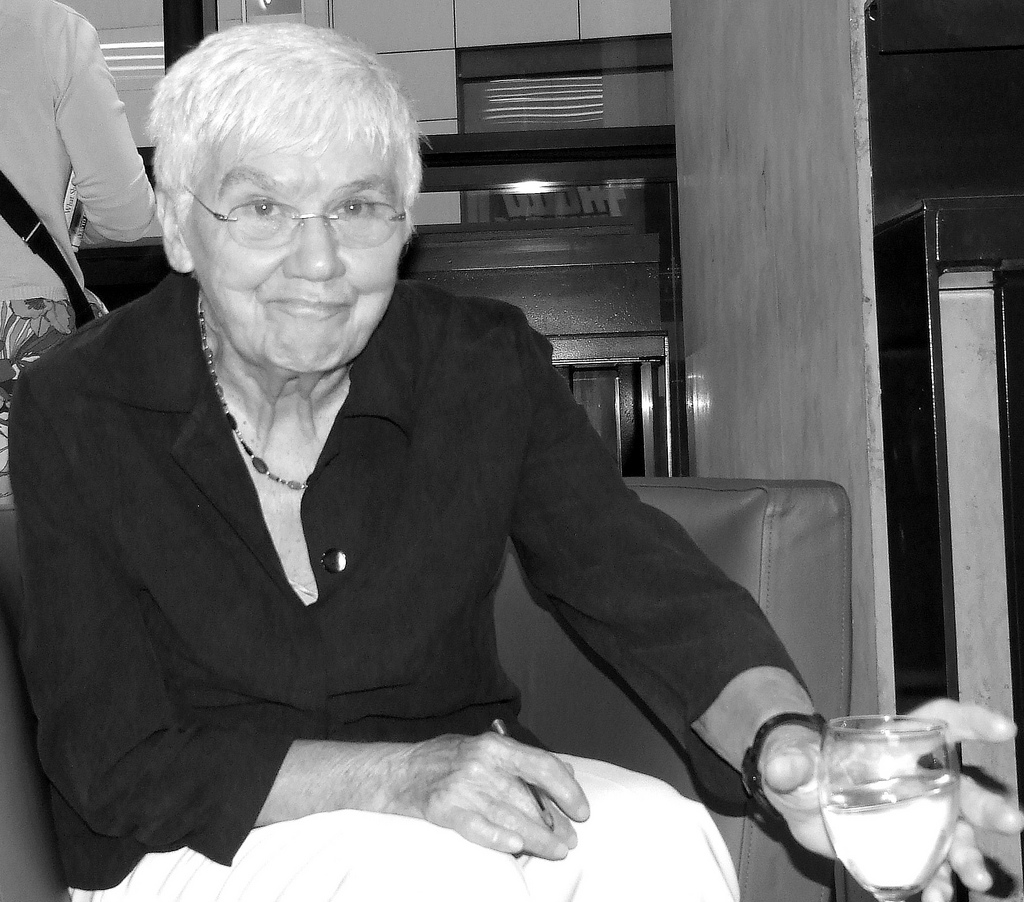
- Dorothy Rowe at Humber Mouth 2009
- Born: December 17, 1930; Newcastle, New South Wales, Australia
- Died: March 25, 2019 (aged 88); Sydney
- Occupation: Psychologist
- Known for: Researching and treating depression

Dorothy Rowe (née Conn; 17 December 1930 – 25 March 2019) was an Australian-British psychologist and author, whose area of interest was depression.

== Early life and education ==
Dorothy Conn was born on 17 December 1930 in Newcastle, New South Wales, Australia.

== Career ==
Rowe came to England in her forties, working at Sheffield University and was the head of Lincolnshire Department of Clinical Psychology. In addition to her published works on depression, she was a regular columnist in the UK.

She spent her time working with depressed patients and, through listening to their stories, came to reject the medical model of mental illness, instead working within personal construct theory. She believed that depression is a result of beliefs which do not enable a person to live comfortably with themselves or the world. Most notably it is the belief in a "Just World" (that the bad are punished and the good rewarded) that exacerbates feelings of fear and anxiety if disaster strikes. Part of recovering is accepting that the external world is unpredictable and that we control relatively little of it.

In July 1989, Rowe made an extended appearance on the British television discussion programme After Dark alongside, among others, Steven Rose, Frank Cioffi, The Bishop of Durham and Michael Bentine.

The BBC were required to apologise to Dorothy Rowe in 2009 after the production editing of her radio interview misrepresented her views on the impact of religion in providing structure to people's lives.

== Death ==
She died on March 25, 2019, in Sydney.

== Works ==
- What Should I Believe?, 2008, ISBN 978-0415-46679-0
- Depression: The Way Out of Your Prison 3rd edition 2003 ISBN 1-58391-286-X
- Friends & Enemies: Our Need to Love and Hate ISBN 0-00-255939-0
- Dorothy Rowe's Guide to Life ISBN 0-00-255562-X
- Wanting Everything: The Art of Happiness ISBN 0-00-637430-1
- Beyond Fear ISBN 0-00-711924-0
- Time on our side: Growing in Wisdom, Not Growing Old ISBN 0-00-215970-8
- Choosing Not Losing: The Experience of Depression ISBN 0-00-637202-3
- Living with the Bomb ISBN 0-7102-0477-9
- The Courage to Live ISBN 0-00-637384-4
- The Successful Self ISBN 0-00-637342-9
- Breaking the Bonds: Understanding Depression, Finding Freedom ISBN 0-00-637565-0
- The Real Meaning of Money ISBN 0-00-255329-5
- My Dearest Enemy, My Dangerous Friend, making and breaking sibling bonds ISBN 978-0-415-39048-4
- Why We Lie ISBN 978-0-00-735-797-0
