= Len Morgan =

A.G. Leonard Morgan

Albert George Leonard ("Len") Morgan (March 23, 1922 – March 11, 2005) was an American aviator, writer, publisher, entrepreneur, photogrammetrist, and investor.

== Early life and education ==
Len Morgan was born in West Terre Haute, Indiana. He was the son of British immigrants, father John ("Jack") Kingsley Morgan, a Presbyterian Minister and mother Juliet ("Jill") Freda née Gardner Morgan, a homemaker. He graduated from high school in Louisville, Kentucky in Spring, 1941.

== Canadian and US military service ==
Len Morgan left for Canada to volunteer for the Royal Canadian Air Force in his late teens. He, along with eleven others from the United States, earned his RCAF Wings on November 21, 1941. After the attack on Pearl Harbor and the U.S.' entry into World War II, he transferred to the United States Army Air Forces in Egypt and flew in Africa and the Middle East.

He attended college at the University of Louisville, on the G.I. Bill, during the 1947 and 1948 school years, following the war. He continued flying for the Kentucky Air National Guard until 1949.

== Photogrammetrist ==
From 1946 through 1949, while serving in the Kentucky Air National Guard, Morgan worked for Park Aerial Services, Inc., of Louisville, Kentucky. His position with the firm was photogrammetrist. In this position, he used photogrammetry to make maps from aerial images.

== Braniff International Airways ==
One of the P-51 Mustangs he flew for the Kentucky Air National Guard was "borrowed" to travel to a short-notice job interview with Braniff International Airways in Dallas, Texas, in 1949. Morgan flew for Braniff for over 33 years, from 1949 until shortly before the airline's 1982 cessation of operations.

Airman Morgan rose to the Captaincy of every aircraft type that Braniff International Airways flew during that period, from the Douglas DC-3 to the Boeing 747. Braniff pilots operated British Airways and Air France Concordes on cooperative interchange flights between Dallas and Washington, DC. The planes, owned by BA/AF and in their respective liveries, then took on BA/AF crews and continued on to London and Paris, respectively. Captain Morgan did not participate in this operation, however, preferring to remain as Captain of the Boeing 747 Jumbo Jet.

Mr. Morgan possessed a Federal Aviation Administration issued Airline Transport Pilot certification with Type Ratings in the Convair 340/440, Lockheed L-188 Electra, Boeing 707 and 720, Boeing 727, and Boeing 747 aircraft.

== Aviation author ==
During and after his airline career, Morgan wrote over thirty books and hundreds of magazine articles on a wide variety of aviation subjects. In 1955, he founded Morgan Aviation Books that specialized in the publication of aviation and airline related subjects. Morgan operated his publication firm until 1975. During this time and until his retirement in 1999, he continuously authored various books and articles.

Morgan's best selling book that he personally authored was titled The P-51 Mustang from the Famous Aircraft Series of books. The P-51 Mustang sold over 50,000 copies.

His monthly column, "Vectors", was a prominent feature of Flying magazine for over twenty years. An accomplished storyteller, he wrote not only of airplanes but also shared gentle wisdom about the people and experiences he encountered over his flying career. Richard L. Collins, former editor of Flying, eulogized, "[Morgan] was as eloquent as anything ever published in Flying. . . In his last "Vectors" column in 1999, Len closed with a reflection on his bond with the readers. 'So, good friends, it was good knowing all of you. Goodbye, wherever you are.'"

== Family ==
Morgan married Margaret Clark nee May, on November 27, 1943. They have two children: son Terry Len, and daughter Juliet Kathryn. Len was the brother of David P. Morgan, editor of Trains Magazine from 1953 until 1987, who died in 1990.

== Publications ==
Len Morgan authored or produced over 30 book titles on aviation related topics, including eleven authored publications:

- The P-51 Mustang, 1963
- The P-47 Thunderbolt, 1963
- The Planes The Aces Flew, 1963
- The Douglas DC-3, 1964
- The AT-6 Harvard, 1965
- Airliners Of The World, 1967
- Crackup!, 1968
- Aviation Hall Of Fame, 1970
- View From The Cockpit, 1985
- Reflections Of A Pilot, 1987
- Vectors, 1992

And two titles coauthored:

- 50 Famous Tanks With G. Bradford, 1967
- The Boeing 727 Scrapbook with his son Terry L. Morgan,1968

As well as 26 publications that he produced between 1961 and 1986.

== Retirement and death ==
After his retirement from Braniff International in 1982, Len Morgan continued writing and publishing books. After closing Morgan Aviation Books in 1975, he continued his writing and publishing as a self-employed person until his final retirement in 1999. In 1988, he was a consultant for the United States Department of Justice, Washington, DC. In 1993, he was engaged in investing in the Palm Harbor, Florida, area, where he moved his family in 1990, and continued this venture until 1999.

In 1990, Morgan created a privately published DVD of the history of Braniff Airways, Inc. covering the years 1928 through 1982. He spent many hours of intensive research that resulted in a unique using of the aircraft that Braniff flew throughout its history to accurately tell the Braniff story. The long disputed painted color of Braniff's first aircraft used on a scheduled flight in 1928, a Stinson Detroiter, was determined to be burgundy in color. Captain Morgan contracted Kodak Corporation to perform an analysis of the only black and white photo known to exist of the aircraft to determine the correct fuselage color.

In the January 2004, issue of Flying Magazine, Len Morgan returned to discuss his retirement, thoughts on flying, and his initial battle with cancer.

Len Morgan died March 11, 2005, after a long battle with cancer. Flying Magazine Senior Editor Richard L. Collins memorialized his dear friend and colleague in the June 2005, issue of the lauded aviation magazine that Mr. Morgan had contributed to for the past two decades. Mr. Collins ended the poignant memorial by stating, after quoting Mr. Morgan crediting his wife for giving him the support to make his lifetime of accomplishments possible, "so have we, for having had this kind, gentle, talented man as a friend and a colleague over all these years."

At Mr. Morgan's request, there was no funeral or memorial services. His family accompanied him on his last flight to scatter his ashes in the Gulf of Mexico.
