= The Science of Hitting =

1971 book by Ted Williams and John Underwood

- Author: Ted Williams with John Underwood
- Language: English
- Subject: Baseball
- Genres: Sport, autobiography
- Publisher: Simon & Schuster
- Publication date: 1971
- Publication place: United States
- Media type: Print (Hardcover)
- Pages: 96
- ISBN: 0671621033

The Science of Hitting is a book written by Major League Baseball player Ted Williams in 1971 and revised in 1986. The book provides advice on hitting in baseball, with detailed illustrations, and anecdotes from Williams' career.

== Summary ==
The book includes sections on:

- How to Think Like a Pitcher and Guess the Pitch
- The Three Cardinal Rules for Developing a Smooth Line-Driving Swing
- The Secrets of Hip and Wrist Action
- Pitch Selection
- Bunting
- Hitting the Opposite Way
