= Flying (magazine) =

Aviation magazine

- Cover of issue 951 (October 2024)
- Categories: Aviation magazine
- Frequency: Monthly
- Publisher: Lisa DeFrees
- Total circulation: 200,737 (December 2012)
- Founded: 1927
- Company: Firecrown
- Country: United States
- Based in: Chattanooga, Tennessee
- Language: English
- Website: www.flyingmag.com
- ISSN: 0015-4806

Flying (sometimes styled FLYING) is an American aviation magazine. First published in 1927 as Popular Aviation, it is read by pilots, aircraft owners, aviation enthusiasts and aviation-oriented executives in business, commercial and general aviation markets worldwide.

It has the largest paid subscription, newsstand, and international circulation of any U.S.-based aviation magazine, according to its former publisher the Bonnier Corporation, and is promoted as "the world's most widely read aviation magazine". It is owned by digital media entrepreneur Craig Fuller.

== History ==
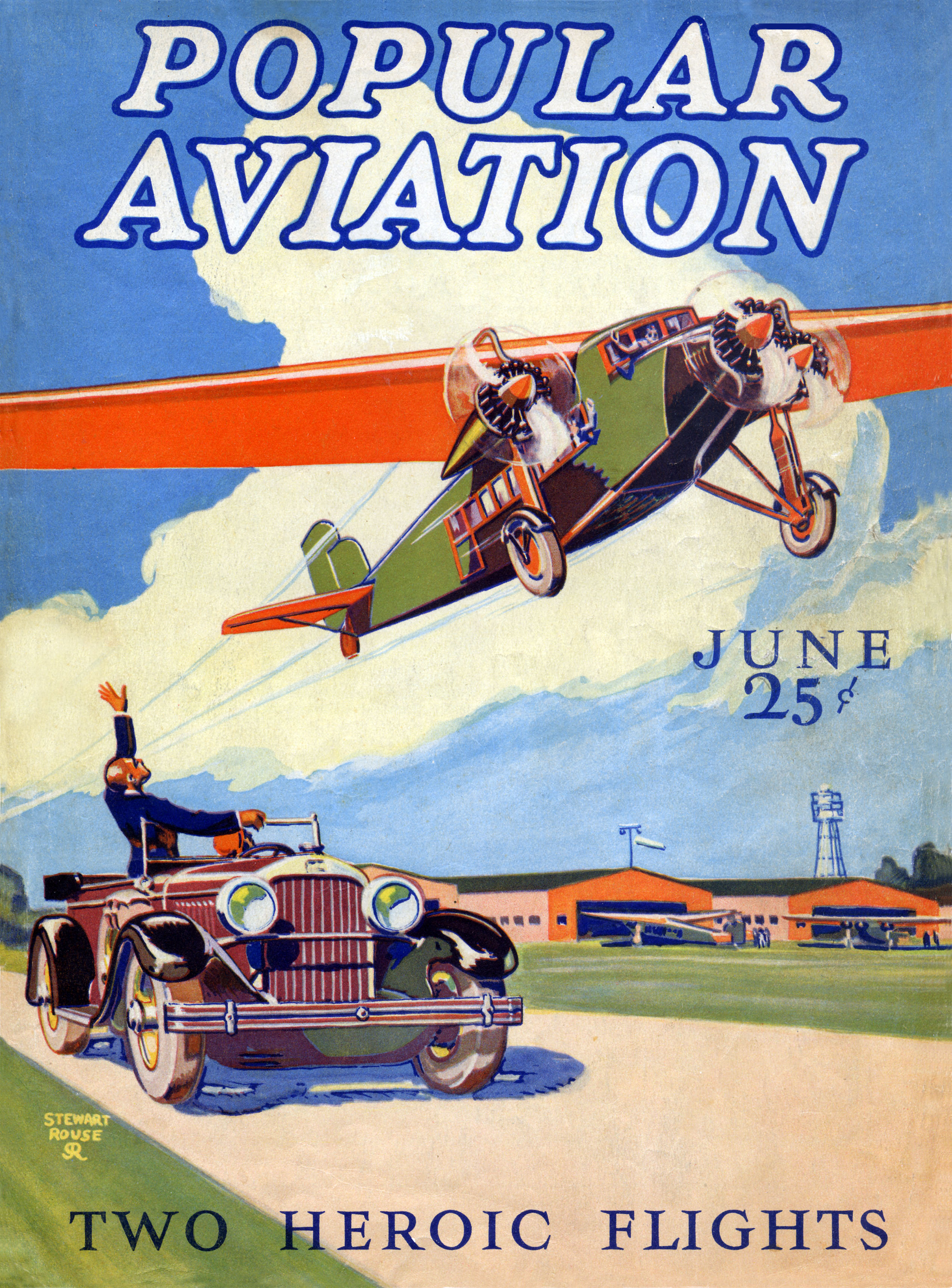
1928 issue of Popular Aviation, predecessor of Flying, which became the largest aviation magazine with a circulation of 100,000.

The magazine first began publishing in 1927 as Popular Aviation soon after Charles Lindbergh's historic transatlantic flight. It was given the name Aeronautics briefly from 1929–1930 and was changed back to Popular Aviation until 1942, when it became Flying.

In June 2009, Flying's owner, Hachette Filipacchi Media U.S., sold the publication to the Bonnier Corporation, the U.S. division of the Sweden-based Bonnier Group, along with four other magazines: Popular Photography, Boating, Sound and Vision, and American Photo.

In July 2021, digital media entrepreneur and pilot Craig Fuller acquired Flying from the Bonnier Corporation and named the new parent company "Flying Media Group", with plans to expand its digital media platform, including online and mobile applications with a bigger focus on aviation photography, podcasts and streaming media. The print magazine went quarterly at the start of 2022, starting with Volume 149, issue 1, styled as "Q1 2022".

In 2023, Flying Media Group acquired the aviation magazine Plane & Pilot, with the intention of having the publication focus on the piston aircraft market. The company also bought out AVweb, AirlineGeeks, and Aircraft for Sale as well as KitPlanes.

After acquisition of more magazine titles, Flying Media Group changed its name to Firecrown.

== Demographics ==
In May 2025, the publication's demographics were as follows:

- 74.28% Male - 25.72% Female
- Largest age group are 55 - 64 year olds
- Geographic reach: United States accounts for 64% of visits

== Contributors ==
- Richard Bach
- Gordon Baxter
- Richard L. Collins
- Mac McClellan
- Nigel Moll
- Peter Garrison
- Len Morgan
- Ernest K. Gann
- Stephen Pope
- Pia Bergqvist
- Martha Lunken
- William Langewiesche
- Rob Mark
- Lane Wallace
- Gill Robb Wilson
- Paul Bowen
- Barry Ross
