= Paul Brennan (academic) =

Irish academic

- Born: 1939; County Roscommon, Ireland
- Died: 2003 (aged 63–64)
- Occupations: Scholar, journal editor
- Board member of: Société Française d'Études Irlandaises (President)

Academic background
- Education: NUI Galway (BA); Sorbonne (English degree)
- Alma mater: University of Paris

Academic work
- Discipline: Irish studies
- Sub-discipline: Irish politics and society
- Institutions: Sorbonne Nouvelle University Paris 3 University of Caen Normandy
- Main interests: French-Irish relations, political history
- Notable works: L’Irlande politique et sociale (founder)

Paul Brennan (1939–2003) was an Irish scholar and journal founder and editor.

== Life ==
Paul Brennan was born in County Roscommon in Ireland in 1939 and died in 2003.

After earning a BA in History from NUI Galway, Brennan left Ireland for France in 1963 and read for an English degree at the Sorbonne. He lived in Paris, meeting his wife Nicole in 1965. In May 1968, they both took part in the student protests in Paris. In 1969 was appointed as a lecturer in the English department at the Sorbonne, later dividing his time between the departments of Irish Studies at Caen University in Normandy, which he headed, and at the Paris III campus of the Sorbonne Nouvelle university.

He created a journal called L’Irlande politique et sociale and for years was co-editor of Etudes irlandaises. He was the long-term vice-president of the CAPES, the competitive recruiting exam for French secondary-school teachers, and President of the SOFEIR (Société Française d’Etudes Irlandaises) for six years.

In 1988 Brennan made an extended appearance on the Channel 4 discussion programme After Dark alongside, among others, Roy Bradford, Henry Kelly, DeLores Tucker, Eamonn McCann and Glenn Barr. In 2021 this programme received a cinema screening during the Docs Ireland documentary festival in Belfast.
