= Edward H. Phillips =

American writer, historian, aviation industry reporter and aviator

Edward H. Phillips is an American writer/historian, aviation industry reporter, and aviator who has specialized in the general aviation industry of the central United States—with particular emphasis on the aviation history of Wichita, Kansas and its aircraft manufacturers.

== Background and credentials ==
Phillips earned a degree in journalism, with a minor in aviation, from the University of North Dakota. A Federal Aviation Administration-certified flight instructor and advanced ground instructor, he earned a commercial pilot license, with instrument and multi-engine ratings for single-and multi-engine land airplanes; and an Airframe and Powerplant aircraft mechanic license.

== Career ==
Phillips is most noted as an aviation writer and historian, with numerous publications, including nine books and over 1,000 articles on aviation and aerospace topics. He is particularly noted as the principal author of books and articles on the early aircraft manufacturers of Wichita, Kansas—the "Air Capital City."

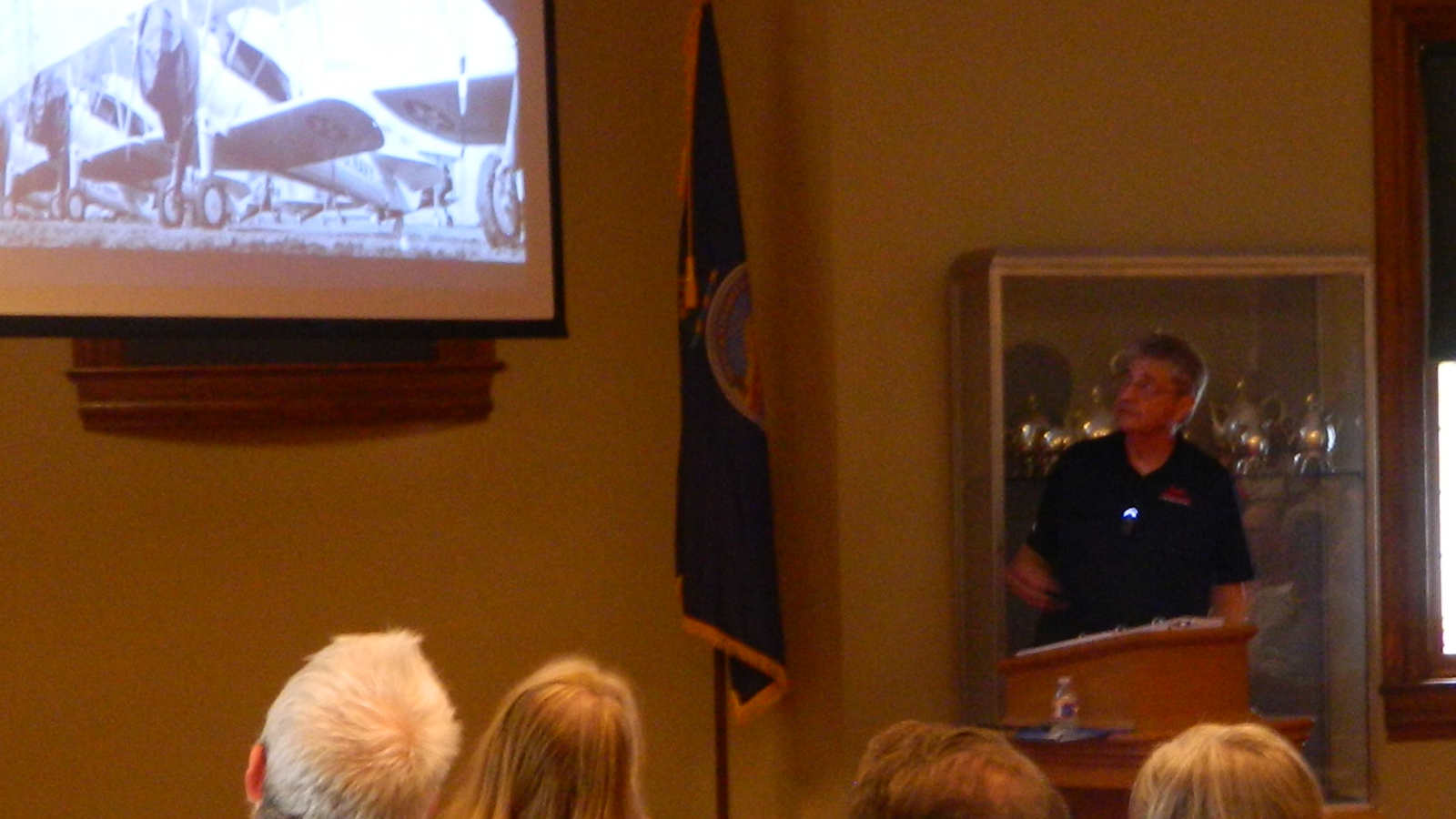
Aviation historian Edward H. Phillips lectures at Stearman Centennial, July 12, 2026, Wichita-Sedgwick County Historical Museum, Kansas

Phillips worked for Wichita's Beech Aircraft Corporation (1978–1986) and for Piedmont Airlines. He served for 21 years as Business Flying writer for Aviation Week and Space Technology magazine, before retiring in 2007 as its Southwest-U.S. Bureau Chief, based in Dallas, Texas.

He also wrote for Air Transport in 1995.

He has written numerous books and articles on general aviation history, including articles for the American Aviation Historical Society Journal, Aviation History magazine (and its affiliate website, HistoryNet.com), and King Air magazine,

He gives aviation history presentations at museums and aviation events, and assists in the production of aviation films.

== Works ==
Phillips' writing and historical research has appeared in numerous books, magazines and journals, online, in documentary films, and in public presentations.

=== Books ===
- Travel Air: Wings Over the Prairie. Flying Books (1982), ISBN 0911139001
- Cessna: A Master's Expression. Eagan, MN: Flying Books (1985), OCLC 13522983
- Cessna: Model 120 to Citation III. Eagan, MN: Flying Books (1986), ISBN 0911139052
- Beechcraft: Pursuit of Perfection. Eagan, MN: Flying Books (1987), ISBN 0911139117
- Beechcraft: Staggerwing to Starship, an Illustrated History Eagan, MN: Flying Books (1987), ISBN 0911139060
- Piper Airplanes: A Legend Aloft. Eagan, MN: Flying Books International (1993), ISBN 0911139141
- Wings of Cessna: Model 120 to Citation X. Eagan, MN: Flying Books International (1994), OCLC 32516985
- The Staggerwing Story - A History of the Beechcraft Model 17 (1996)
- Mystery Ship: A History of the Travel Air Type R Monoplanes So. St. Paul, MN: Flying Books International (1999). ISBN 091113929X
- Laird Aircraft: A Legacy of Speed (2002). ISBN 1580070701
- Stearman Aircraft: A Detailed History North Branch, MN: Specialty Press (2006), ISBN 1580070876

=== Magazine articles ===
(partial listing of article lists)

- "Edward H. Phillips," articles list, Aviation Week and Space Technology magazine
- Search: "Edward H. Phillips," (articles list) at HistoryNet.com (including Aviation History magazine).
- "Edward Phillips, author, King Air magazine (article list with teasers, linking to full texts of Phillips' articles, most also online)

=== Journal articles ===
(peer-reviewed)

- American Aviation Historical Society Journal
  - Volume 25 - 1980, p. 268: "Navigation in the 1926 Ford Reliability Tour"
  - Volume 27 - 1982, p. 286: "Mystery Ship"
  - Volume 29 - 1984, p. 294: "Staggerwing"
  - Volume 30 - 1985, p. 24: "Woolaroc!"
  - Volume 56, No. 3 - Fall 2011: "Travel Air Mystery Ship"

=== Online articles ===
(partial listings)

- "Edward H_ Phillips, 'Barnstorming Wichita’s Aviation Past,'", the collected sequence of articles (starting with "C-34 Airmaster") written by Edward H. Phillips, for the Wings Over Kansas aviation news and history website
- Search: "Edward H. Phillips," (articles list) in HistoryNet (including Aviation History magazine)
- "Edward H. Phillips," articles list, Aviation Week and Space Technology magazine
- "Edward Phillips, author, King Air magazine (article list with teasers, linking to full texts of Phillips' articles)

=== Film and video ===
- Cessna: A Master's Expression, 2007, Cessna Aircraft Company and TZ Productions, debuted 12 September 2008 on KPTS-TV (subsequent distributor), derived largely from Phillips' book of the same title, with Phillips' as the principal narrator and historian.
- Wichita: The Air Capital by KPTS-TV and Chris Franks, 2020. Phillips is the principal historian interviewed and aired in the program.
- Wichita & the Air Capital of the World, 2014, filmed presentation at the Wichita-Sedgwick County Historical Museum, YouTube
