= Ian Kennedy (legal scholar) =

British academic lawyer

Sir Ian Kennedy
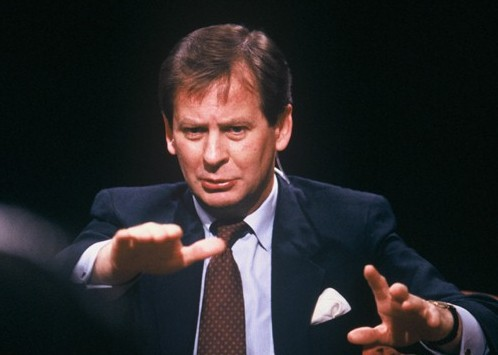
- Kennedy hosting the television discussion programme After Dark in 1987
- Born: Ian McColl Kennedy; 14 September 1941 (age 85); Tipton, Staffordshire, England
- Education: King Edward VI College, Stourbridge, Worcestershire
- Occupations: Emeritus Professor of Health Law, Ethics and Policy
- Employer: University College London
- Known for: Academic Lawyer
- Spouse: 1. Ilsa Echegaray (married 1967) (divorced c.1970) (died 2006); 2. Mary Kennedy; 3. Andrea Gage

Sir Ian McColl Kennedy (born 14 September 1941) is a British academic lawyer who has specialised in the law and ethics of health. He was appointed to chair the Independent Parliamentary Standards Authority in 2009.

== Education and academic career ==
1952–1959: He attended King Edward VI College, Stourbridge, Worcestershire where he spent four years in the sixth form.

1960–1963: He attended University College London, graduated 1st class Hons. LLB.

1963–1965: Fulbright Fellow at University of California, Berkeley (LLM).

1965–1970: Sub-Dean, Tutor and Lecturer in Law at University College London (LLD).

1966–1967: Ford Foundation fellow of Yale University and Mexico University.

In the summer of 1969 Kennedy visited Cuba to study the administration of justice, supported by a Hayter Fellowship awarded by the Institute of Latin American Studies, University of London (by Prof. R.A. Humphreys). In December/January 1970 – 1971 he returned to Cuba to gain information for his paper titled "Cuba's Ley Contra La Vagancia – The Law on Loafing".

Kennedy was Dean of the Law School at King's College London, from 1986 to 1996. Kennedy is Emeritus Professor of Health Law, Ethics and Policy at University College London. He is an honorary Bencher of the Inner Temple.

Kennedy was the BBC's Reith lecturer (on the subject of "Unmasking Medicine") in 1980 and hosted many editions of After Dark on Channel 4.

== Committees and inquiries ==
Kennedy has been a member of numerous committees and inquiries.

For nine years, he was a member of the General Medical Council. In 1978, he founded the Centre of Medical Laws and Ethics, of which he later became president. He also served as member of the Medicines Commission, and the Department of Health advisory group on AIDS. He is a member of the board of the UK Research Integrity Office.

In 1997, he took part in a UK Government inquiry that gave cautious approval to xenotransplantation (the use of animal-to-human transplants), and in 1998, was a member of the committee that recommended pet passports.

Kennedy was a member of the Nuffield Council on Bioethics 1991–2002 and Chair during 1998–2002.

Kennedy is a trustee of homeless health charity Pathway.

He chaired the public inquiry into children's heart surgery at the Bristol Royal Infirmary (1998–2001), which concluded that paediatric cardiac surgery services at Bristol were "simply not up to the task", because of shortages of key surgeons and nurses, and a lack of leadership, accountability, and teamwork. This resulted in his becoming chair of the Healthcare Commission, from its creation (in shadow form) in 2003, until it was merged with other regulatory bodies to form the Care Quality Commission in 2009. In October 2009, Kennedy became chair of the King's Fund's inquiry into the quality of general practice in England, replacing Niall Dickson. He led an inquiry into the work of breast surgeon Ian Paterson in Birmingham in 2013.

== Involvement in medicine and alternative medicine ==
In 2010, he was elected inaugural Vice-President of the College of Medicine, an organisation set up to bring together patients and clinicians on an equal footing. Several commentators, writing in The Guardian and The British Medical Journal claim that this organisation is simply a re-branding of Prince Charles' alternative medicine lobbying group the Foundation for Integrated Health. This has been denied by the College of Medicine whose President is Graeme Catto, for seven years the President of the General Medical Council.

=== Awards ===
Kennedy was knighted in 2002 for services to medical law and bioethics. He is an Honorary Fellow of:

- British Academy (2002)
- Royal College of General Practitioners (2002)
- Royal College of Physicians (2003)
- Royal College of Paediatrics and Child Health (2004)
- Royal College of Anaesthetists (2004)
- Royal College of Surgeons of Edinburgh (2005)
- Chartered Institute of Internal Auditors (2009)

He was also awarded an Honorary DSc degree by the University of Glasgow in 2003.

== Publications ==
- Kennedy, Ian (11 June 1981). The Unmasking of Medicine. Allen & Unwin. p. 240. ISBN 978-0-04-610016-2.
- Kennedy, Ian (19 September 1991). Treat Me Right: Essays in Medical Law and Ethics. Clarendon Paperbacks. p. 446. ISBN 978-0-19-825558-1.
- Kennedy, Ian; Grubb, Andrew (March 1994). Medical Law: Text and Materials. Butterworths Law. p. 1200. ISBN 978-0-406-00623-3.
- Woolf, Harry; Kennedy, Ian; Freilich, Gloria; Donaldson, Liam; Carrier, John (February 2007). Law, Medicine and Ethics: Essays in Honour of Lord Jakobovits. Cancerkin. p. 224. ISBN 978-0-9554799-0-8.
- Kennedy, Ian (9 December 2010). Grubb, Andrew; Laing, Judith; McHale, Jean (eds.). Principles of Medical Law. OUP Oxford. p. 1320. ISBN 978-0-19-954440-0.
