= John W. Underwood =

American aviation writer, photographer and historian

John W. Underwood, better known as John Underwood, is an aviation writer, photographer, and historian specializing in United States aviation. He is the author of more than a dozen books on the subject, and writes articles published in aviation history journals and magazines.

== Early life ==
Underwood has had a lifelong fascination with airplanes since age 7. Underwood has said "I was always crazy about flying."

Underwood's father was a bacteriologist, and a prize-winning amateur photographer. His father had access to a fleet of Stinson Aircraft, while director of research for AMSCO, Inc. Occasionally, John would get to ride along on day trips. In 1939, at age seven, John received his first flight instruction in a Stinson SR9B Reliant, while sitting on his father's lap to reach the controls. His father was a casualty of World War II.

In his teenage years, Underwood lived near Grand Central Air Terminal in Glendale, California, the first official air terminal for the Greater Los Angeles area. His first full time job was there, packaging engines overhauled by the U.S. Air Force. (He would later base his personal plane there, until the airfield's closure, later writing two books about it, and then serving as a key consultant and resource for the terminal's historic restoration and commemoration.)

In 1949, at age 17, Underwood learned to fly at the Glendale School of Aeronautics, while working for Grand Central Aircraft, refurbishing surplus World War II aircraft, including (North American P-51 Mustang fighters, Curtiss-Wright C-46 Commando transports, and North American B-25 Mitchell bombers.

== Aviation communications career ==
Underwood became an aviation technical writer and illustrator, and began to amass a collection of thousands of aviation photographs and aeronautical materials. Underwood is believed to have been a member of the International Amateur Aircraft Photographers Exchange (IAAPE), a 1930s-era group who developed a significant collection of historical aviation images.

In 1953, Underwood published his first book, The World's Famous Racing Aircraft: 1925–1953. In 1956, at age 23, he was a college student studying mechanical engineering.

Residing in Southern California, one of the world's principal aviation centers, He became acquainted with dozens of aviation celebrities, including air racer / test pilot Gordon Israel, pilot/designer Alden Brown ("Alden Brown Racer" creator), and pioneer aviator Douglas "Wrong Way" Corrigan. While working for Lockheed Aircraft, he befriended Lockheed's chief test pilot, Tony LeVier, working with him to restore a 1927/1928 Velie Monocoupe). Though it was Underwood's first airplane, he never got to fly it. It became a hanging exhibit at the entrance to the California Science Center.

Underwood was the 38th member of the American Aviation Historical Society (AAHS), joining shortly after its founding in 1955/1956.

Underwood became a principal aviation history author, consultant and photo-supplier for the journals of the AAHS and the Vintage Aircraft Association (of the EAA). He was named the contributing editor of Vintage Airplane magazine, and contributed to the EAA's Sport Aviation magazine. He also wrote for Air Progress and Air Trails, and served as a correspondent for various foreign aviation magazines.

Underwood became a supplier of aviation historical information, materials, and photos to other aviation historians, writers, editors and publications, and aviation history web sites. The 1990 PBS/American Experience television documentary, Lindbergh, used images from Underwood's collection.

Between 1953 and the present, Underwood has published at least 13 books, mostly through aviation and history publishers, on various topics of aviation history and historical aircraft, chiefly American.

Many of his works have been archived in various major museums, institutions and organizations, including:

- The National Air and Space Museum of the Smithsonian Institution;
- San Diego Air and Space Museum
- Wright State University,

== Publications ==
=== Books ===
(partial list)

- The World's Famous Racing Aircraft: 1925–1953, 1953, John W. Underwood, publisher. ASIN B0023WOIQA
- Experimental light aircraft and midget racers, 1958, Aero Publishers, ASIN B000NSFMAC
- World Aircraft Illustrated, 1961, Aero Publishers, ASIN B000SNECGW
- The Art Chester Story, (with John W. Caler), c.1968, John W. Caler Publications
- The Vintage & Veteran Aircraft Guide: Over 400 Pre-1945 Aircraft Described and Illustrated, (with Peter M. Bowers), 1969, Heritage Press, ISBN 978-0-911834-02-4
- The Stinsons: the exciting chronicle of a flying family and the 'planes that enhanced their fame, 1969, 1976, 1982, Heritage Press, Glendale, California, SBN 911834-06-0, LCC 69-17708
- Light Plane, 1909–69 (with George B. Collinge), 1970, Aviation Book Company, ISBN 978-0-911834-07-9.
- Acrobats in the Sky: Aerobatics since 1913, 1972, Aviation Book Co., ISBN 978-0-911834-08-6, ISBN 0-911834-08-7
- Of Monocoupes and Men: The Don Luscombe, Clayton Folkerts Story, 1969, 1973, 1975, Heritage Press, ISBN 978-0-911834-04-8
- The Lightplane Since 1909, (with George B. Collinge), 1975, Heritage Press
- The Stinsons: Air Pioneers & Aircraft, 1976, Aviation Book Co. ISBN 978-0-911834-06-2
- Madcaps, Millionaires and "Mose": The Chronicle of an Exciting Era When the Airways Led to Glendale, 1984, Heritage Press, ISBN 978-0-911834-16-1
- Grand Central Air Terminal, 2007, Images of Aviation Series, Arcadia Publishing

=== Articles ===
(partial list)

- Search for "Underwood", American Aviation Historical Society Journal and Flightline newsletter

== Honors and recognition ==
- 2011 Inductee, Vintage Aircraft Association (EAA) Hall of Fame
- 2016 "Lifetime Achievement Award," American Aviation Historical Society
