= John Underwood (sportswriter) =

American sportswriter

- Born: November 25, 1934; Miami, Florida, U.S.
- Died: April 12, 2023 (aged 88); Miami, Florida, U.S.
- Education: University of Miami (B.A.)
- Occupations: Sportswriter; Author
- Spouse: Beverly Holland (divorced) Donna Simmons (before 2023)
- Children: 6

John Warren Underwood (November 25, 1934 – April 12, 2023) was an American sportswriter who spent most of his career with Sports Illustrated magazine. He is best known for ghostwriting with Baseball Hall of Fame slugger Ted Williams, most notably co-authoring Williams' autobiography and his book The Science of Hitting.

== Early life and education ==
Underwood was born in Miami, Florida. His father was a charter boat captain and his mother was a homemaker. At school, his classmate and close friend was Don Wright, later a two-time Pulitzer Prize cartoonist.

He attended the University of Miami where he majored in English.

== Career ==
While attending university, Underwood began working at the Miami Herald. He joined the newspaper full-time after graduating in 1954. In 1961, Underwood moved to Sports Illustrated where he would work until 1984.

With the magazine, Underwood specialized in covering college football. Additionally, he also covered boxing, golf, baseball and professional football, as well as the impact of gambling on sports, players and fans. In 1982, he was ghostwrote an article for former NFL player Don Reese which revealed that he and numerous NFL players had used cocaine. He left the magazine in order to focus on freelance writing.

=== Relationship with Ted Williams ===
Underwood met Hall of Fame baseball player Ted Williams in the Florida Keys while writing a profile about the Hall of Famer's life in retirement as an expert fisherman. Williams liked the story and agreed to sit down with Underwood for a four-part autobiographical piece which ended up turning into My Turn at Bat, Williams' autobiography.

Underwood wrote about their months long interview sessions in the editor's note of the first installment: "We got along fine. He gets gruff at times. He gets into these little black rages. You have to bark back sometimes to let him know you're alive." A few years later, they wrote The Science of Hitting, the purpose of which, according to Underwood, was "puncture" myths about hitting. Their third book together was about Williams' second career as a fisherman.

After Williams' death, Underwood described him as being an uncle towards him. Even after their books were written, the two would go hunting and fishing together. Underwood wrote his last book Its Only Me as a tribute to Williams and their friendship.

== Personal life ==
Underwood was married twice. His first marriage to Beverly Holland ended in divorce. His second marriage to Donna Simmons lasted until his death on April 12, 2023. He had six children: four from his first marriage, and two from his second. Additionally, he was survived by 12 grandchildren and five great-grandchildren.

== Written works ==
=== With Ted Williams ===
- My Turn at Bat: The Story of My Life (1969)
- The Science of Hitting (1971)
- Ted Williams' Fishing the Big Three: Tarpon, Bonefish, Atlantic Salmon (1982)

=== Others ===
- Bear: The Hard Life and Good Times of Alabama's Coach Bryant (with Bear Bryant; 1975)
- The Death of an American Game (1979)
- When in Doubt, Fire the Manager (with Alvin Dark; 1980)
- Spoiled Sport: A Fan's Notes on the Troubles of Spectator Sports (1984)
- Manning: A Father, His Sons and a Football Legacy (with Archie Manning; 2000)
- It's Only Me: The Ted Williams We Hardly Knew (2005)
