= Richard L. Collins =

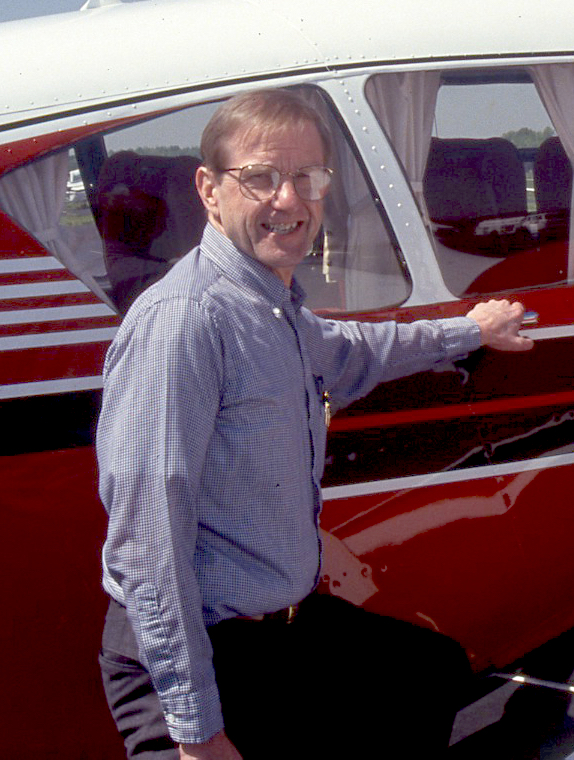
- Born: November 28, 1933
- Died: April 29, 2018 (aged 84)
- Occupations: Author and journalist
- Spouse: Ann Slocomb Collins
- Children: Three
- Relatives: Leighton Collins
- Writing career
- Years active: 1947 ― 2018
- Subject: Aviation
- Notable work: Flying IFR

Richard Lawrence Collins (November 28, 1933 – April 29, 2018) was an American aviation author and journalist.

Collins earned his private pilot certificate in 1952 and subsequently logged over 20,000 hours in general aviation airplanes. He was the son of Leighton Collins (20 April 1902 — 16 January 1995), a well-known aviation writer, pioneering flight safety advocate and founder of Air Facts magazine. Richard Collins died on April 29, 2018, aged 84.

== Magazine editor and writer ==
The first article that Richard Collins wrote appeared in the November 1947 issue of Air Facts. In 1968, Collins began writing for Flying magazine, and he was named Editor in Chief in 1977. He moved to AOPA Pilot magazine as Publisher and Editor in 1988. In 1993, he returned to Flying as an editor at large, where he wrote a monthly column as well as feature articles. In October 2008 Collins retired as a regular contributor to Flying magazine. At the time of retirement, Collins had been on the masthead of an aviation magazine since July 1958.

== Re-launch of Air Facts ==
In 2011 Richard Collins and John Zimmerman joined with Sporty's Pilot Shop to launch an online version of the print magazine Air Facts, which Richard's father had originated in 1938 and which had continued until 1976. Listed as 'Emeritus Editor', Collins published a blog on the site and wrote articles for the journal. His final contribution to the site was published on 22 March 2018, five weeks before his death.

During his nearly 61-year writing career, Collins wrote 1500+ magazine articles, 13 books, and created a library of aviation training videos.

== Books ==
Collins authored 13 books about aviation weather and flying technique:

- Flying IFR
- Flying the Weather Map
- Flight Level Flying
- Instrument Flying Refresher
- Air Crashes
- Mastering the Systems: Air Traffic Control and Weather
- The Perfect Flight
- Tips to Fly by
- Thunderstorms and Airplanes
- Flying Safely
- Pilot Upgrade: How to Stay Current in Safety
- Logbooks: Life in Aviation
- The Next Hour: The Most Important Hour in Your Logbook – released in 2009; the last of his books, dealing with the prevention of aircraft accidents.

== Personal ==
Collins married Ann Slocomb in 1958. They had three children, Charlotte, Sarah, and Richard. His wife died on 26 March 2013. She was a staunch supporter and editorial assistant to Collins during their 55-year marriage.
