= Haitham Rashid Wihaib =

Iraqi man

Haitham Rashid Wihaib is an Iraqi man who claims that he was former Iraqi president Saddam Hussein's minister of protocol from 1980 to 1993.

Wihaib's father was an Iraqi general who was killed in a car accident orchestrated by Saddam. Wihaib studied in France for several years during the 1970s, earning three doctorates. Upon returning to Iraq he caught the attention of Saddam Hussein, who offered him a job as his minister of protocol, a cabinet position that amounts to essentially a personal secretary. Wihaib accepted, later saying that one didn't say no to Saddam.

Dr. Wihaib had near daily contact with Saddam for the duration of his time in the position; toward the end he fell out of favor and was the target of several assassination attempts. He escaped from Iraq to London with the aid of British intelligence in 1993. He kept a relatively low profile for several years after that. Beginning in 2002 his name surfaced in news reports attached to descriptions of atrocities committed by Saddam and supporting the US led invasion of Iraq. His prior absence from Western media outlets led some (particularly in the online blogging community) to suspect that he was a fabrication of the American and British governments to provide disinformation to news sources.

In February 2005 Wihaib made his first visit to the United States, speaking at Virginia Polytechnic Institute and State University on his experiences with Saddam and his hopes for Iraq's future. Coordinators of the event were initially unaware or unsure of his importance; they were later able to verify his background. At the writing of this article Wihaib is scheduled to speak at two other universities and appear on the American news channel CNN.

Wihaib has published a book in Europe, In the Shadow of Saddam, which is also available in Arabic. He also helped create a documentary about his experiences called Dancing with the Devil which was at the time of this article not yet released.

Currently Wihaib served as the chairman of the New Iraqi Green Party and the New Iraq Organization for Justice. He is particularly concerned with relieving debts incurred by Saddam's regime.
