= Roisin McAuley =

Irish presenter

Roisin McAuley is a writer and former broadcaster.

== Biography ==
She grew up in Cookstown in County Tyrone went to a convent boarding school, and then to Queen's University Belfast to study history.

She joined BBC Northern Ireland in 1969 and was the broadcaster's first Catholic female newsreader and announcer. She went on to become a reporter for BBC programmes such as Spotlight, Newsnight, Panorama and File on 4. She has also produced and directed television documentaries for ITV and Channel 4 and written and presented programmes on BBC Radio 3 and 4.

McAuley's first two novels, Singing Bird and Meeting Point, were sold at auction to Headline (world rights) who published in 2004 and 2005. The US rights sold to HarperCollins, Dutch rights to House of Books and the German rights to Droemer. The rights to Roisin McAuley's next two books, "Finding Home" and "French Secrets" were sold to Time Warner Books UK in 2005. She is also published in Poland, Portugal and Brazil..

== Sources ==
- Sandra Chapman (26 April 2004). "Singing bird celebrates her success". Europe Intelligence Wire.
- "From local journalism to literary acclaim". Europe Intelligence Wire. 23 June 2005.
