= Martin Israel =

British pathologist

Martin Spencer Israel (30 April 1927 – 23 October 2007) was a British pathologist, Anglican priest, spiritual director and author of numerous books on Christian life and teaching.

== Early life and education ==
Martin Spencer Israel was born in Johannesburg, South Africa, to a liberal Jewish family; his father was an ophthalmic surgeon. He learnt about Christianity from the family's black African servants and was deeply impressed by the image of Jesus on the cross which convinced him that his life would be about reconciliation. As a child, he was a loner with a natural tendency towards introversion and mystical experience.

An outstanding scholar, he was educated first at Parktown Boys' High School, Johannesburg, then went on to study medicine at the University of Witwatersrand, where he was awarded a first class honours degree. In 1951 he travelled to England to do postgraduate research, becoming first a doctor at Hammersmith Hospital, London, and then a pathology registrar at the Royal Hospital, Wolverhampton. After doing compulsory National Service in the Royal Army Medical Corps, he became lecturer in pathology at the Royal College of Surgeons, London, being promoted to senior lecturer in 1968. He went on to become the co-author of a standard textbook in pathology.

== Religious view ==
However, he was very shy and suffered for many years from depression which he eventually overcame with the help of psychotherapy. He was drawn to various mystical traditions and the works of people such as Carl Jung, Teilhard de Chardin and Martin Buber, discovering that he possessed considerable psychic sensitivity and had the gift of healing. He entered the Anglican ministry in 1974, eventually becoming the priest at Holy Trinity Church in South Kensington in 1983 - a post he held until 1996.

Later in life he suffered from Parkinson's disease.

== Spiritual ministry ==
In his capacity as an Anglican priest he was a lecturer, personal counsellor and organiser of religious retreats. He also exercised a healing ministry, conducted exorcisms and was president of both the Guild of Health (1983–1990) and the Churches' Fellowship for Psychical and Spiritual Studies (1983–1998). He claimed to have regular contact with spirits of the dead (mediumship) and believed in the possibility of reincarnation. He became widely known as the author of many books dealing with spiritual issues from a mystical Christian perspective.

== Writings ==
- The Pain That Heals (Continuum International Publishing Group, 2002).
- Learning to Love (Mowbray, 21 Dec 2000).
- Precarious Living: The Path to Life’’ (Continuum International Publishing Group, 2000).
- Summons to Life (Continuum International Publishing Group, 2000).
- Happiness That Lasts (Continuum International Publishing Group, 1999).
- Doubt: The Way of Growth (Continuum International Publishing Group, 1997).
- Exorcism (SPCK, 1997).
- Angels: Messengers of Grace (SPCK, 1995).
- Dark Victory (Mowbray 1995).
- Life Eternal (SPCK, 1993).
- Night Thoughts (SPCK, 1990).
- The Quest for Wholeness (Darton, 1989).
- Creation: The Consummation of the World (Zondervan, 1989).
- The Spirit of Counsel (Continuum International Publishing, 1987).
- Gethsemane: The transfiguring love - Lent Book (Fount, 1987).
- Coming in Glory (Darton, Longman & Todd, 1986).
- Healing As Sacrament (Cowley Publications, 1985).
- Smouldering Fire: The work of the Holy Spirit (Continuum International Publishing, 1984).
- Living Alone: Inward Journey to Fellowship (SPCK, 1982).
- Approach to Spirituality (Churches' Fellowship for Psychical & Spiritual Studies, 1971)
