= John Underwood (PR adviser) =

British politician

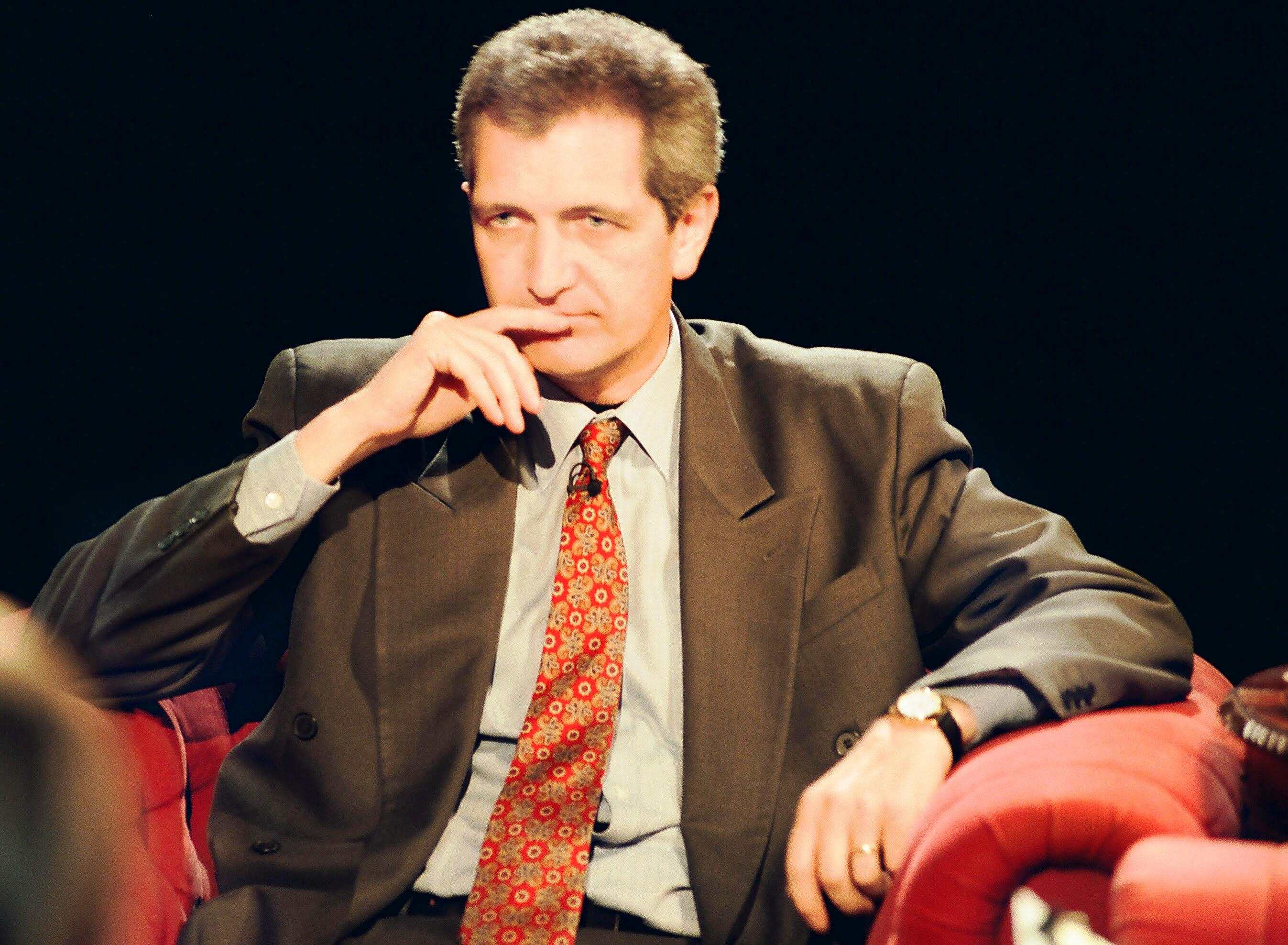
John Underwood hosting the television discussion programme After Dark in 1997

John Underwood is a PR adviser, now executive director of Freshwater UK PLC. He is also director of the Centre for Health Communication Research at Buckinghamshire New University where he has been a visiting professor since 2011. He founded the Clear consultancy in 1991 after work as a reporter and presenter for the BBC, ITV and Channel 4, where he presented After Dark, a late-night discussion programme. He was Director of Communications for the British Labour Party from June 1990 to June 1991.

He has advised NHS organisations on communication issues including major health service reconfigurations. Underwood is former chair and trustee of the health charity, Alcohol Change UK and a trustee of the Joint Council for Cosmetic Practitioners (JCCP), which operates an accredited register for non-surgical cosmetic practitioners. It is working towards greater regulation in the cosmetic sector.
