= Jeremy Coid =

British psychiatrist

Jeremy Coid is Professor of Forensic Psychiatry at Queen Mary University of London and East London NHS Foundation Trust, London, UK. He is Director of the Violence Prevention Research Unit (VPRU) in the Wolfson Institute of Preventive Medicine and a participant in the WHO Violence Prevention Alliance. He has interviewed and provided analysis on the child serial killer Ian Brady.

== Biography ==
Coid has made two extended appearances on the TV discussion programme After Dark. In the first, chaired by Matthew Parris in 1991, he joined among others Michael Winner and the father of The Yorkshire Ripper. The second, in 2003, chaired by Baroness Helena Kennedy QC, aroused a measure of controversy.

VPRU research focuses on the epidemiology of violence in the general population, prediction of violence and risk assessment for offenders. The VPRU have made a major breakthrough in identifying the causal link between delusions and violence. A survey of Young Men's Health led to the identification of the previously undescribed heavy burden on NHS Mental Health Services posed by gang members in the UK. No stranger to controversy, Professor Coid has recently described the difficulties of using standardised tools to predict violence amongst psychopaths because he exhibits all the traits of one himself with statistical findings proving that they are no more reliable than chance and has reopened debate on this subject and received a lot of media attention.
