= Frank Cioffi =

American philosopher (1928–2012)

Frank Louis Cioffi, of Baruch College is Frank Cioffi's nephew.

Frank Cioffi (11 January 1928 – 1 January 2012) was an American philosopher educated in New York and Oxford.

Cioffi held posts at the University of Singapore, the University of Kent and the University of Essex, where he was a founding member of the Department of Philosophy.

He wrote on Sigmund Freud and psychoanalysis, Ludwig Wittgenstein, and behaviour and explanation.

== Works ==
- Wittgenstein on Freud and Frazer, Cambridge University Press (1998), trade paperback, 310 pages ISBN 0521626242 ISBN 978-0521626248
- Freud and the Question of Pseudoscience, Open Court (1998), trade paperback, 313 pages ISBN 081269385X ISBN 978-0812693850
