= Hipódromo =

Hipódromo, a Spanish and Portuguese word meaning "racecourse", may refer to:

- Barrio Hipódromo, a populated place in Maldonado Department, Uruguay
- Colonia Hipódromo Condesa, a neighborhood west of the historic center of Mexico City
- Hipódromo, a populated place in Cerro Largo Department, Uruguay
- Hipódromo, a neighbourhood in Asunción, Paraguay
- Hipódromo, a sector of Santurce, San Juan, Puerto Rico
- Jardines del Hipódromo, a neighbourhood in Montevideo, Uruguay
- Jardines del Hipódromo Stadium, a sports venue in Montevideo, Uruguay

== See also ==
- Hippodrome (disambiguation)
