= Uri Sagi =

Israeli retired general

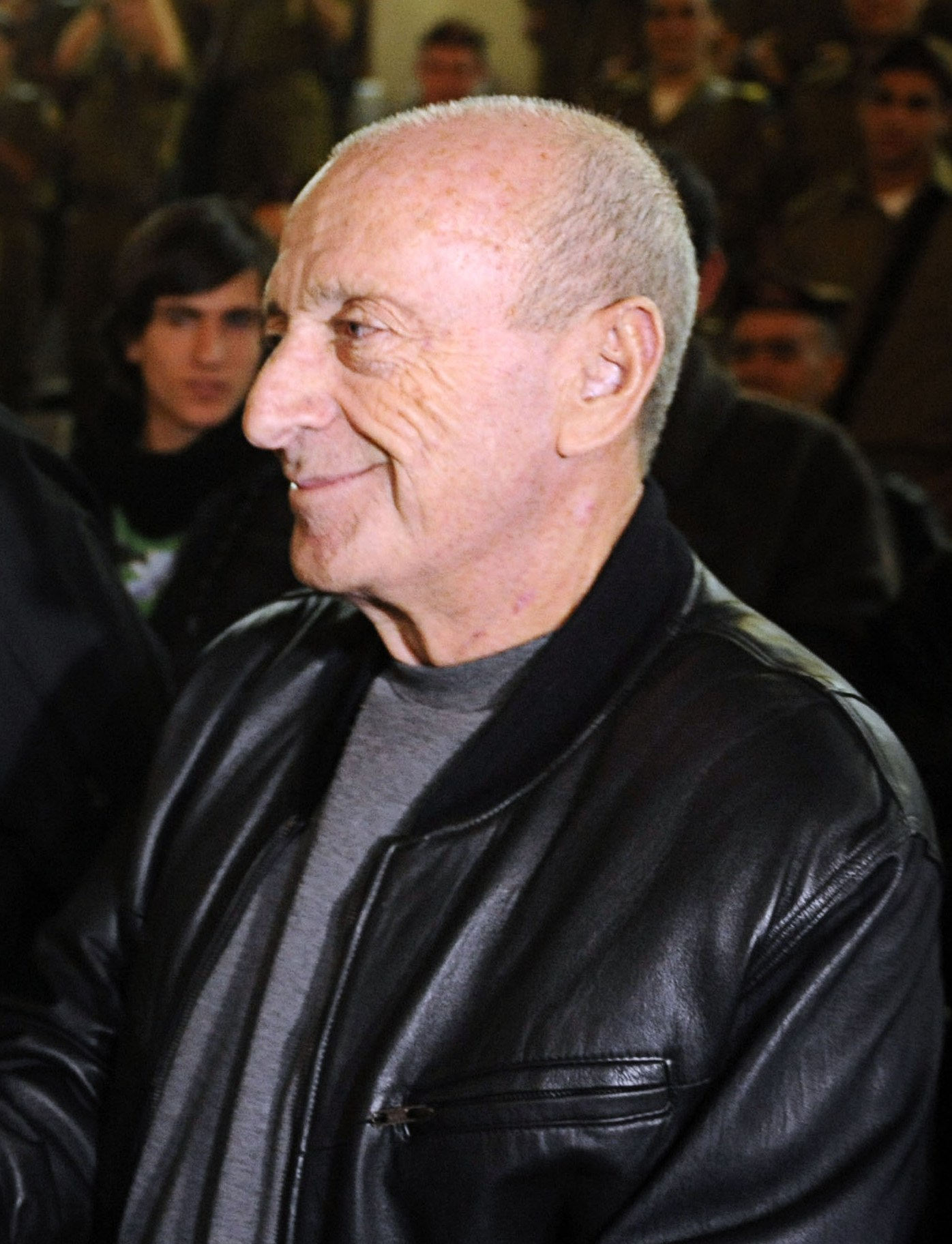
- Native name: אורי שגיא
- Born: August 5, 1943 (age 83); Kfar Bialik, Mandatory Palestine
- Allegiance: Israel Defense Forces
- Service years: 1961–1995
- Rank: Aluf
- Commands: Golani Brigade, 36th Division, Southern Command, GOC Army Headquarters, Military Intelligence Directorate, Commander GOC Army Headquarters
- Conflicts: Six-Day War; War of Attrition; Yom Kippur War; Operation Entebbe; 1982 Lebanon War; South Lebanon conflict First Intifada
- Other work: Chairman of Mekorot

Uri Sagi (Hebrew: אורי שגיא; born 5 August 1943) is an Israeli retired general who held several prominent posts including commander of the Golani Brigade and chief of the IDF's Military Intelligence Directorate.

In 2000–2003 Uri Sagi was the CEO of Mekorot, Israel's national water company.

== Biography ==
Uri Sagi was born in Kiryat Bialik during the Mandate era, a seventh generation native of Palestine. He is married to Gila and has three children. He had a fourth daughter born outside of marriage who died of leukemia at age 19.

In 2012, years after his active military service, Sagi ran for the Awoda in the Knesset election. After allegations against him of sexual misconduct were brought before the party leadership in the mid-1970s, he withdrew his candidacy for the list.

== Military service ==
Sagi was drafted into the IDF in 1961 and did his military service in the Golani Brigade, of which he became commander in 1976–1977. He served in the Brigade as a soldier, a squad leader. In 1963 he became an infantry officer after completing Officer Candidate School and return to the Golani Brigade. In The Six Day War he served as a company commander in Golani Brigade's 51 battalion and fought in the Golan Heights. Afterwards he commanded Golani Brigade's Reconnaissance company during the War of Attrition. Sagi led Golani Brigade's 13 battalion and served as in the IDF's Operations Directorate during the Yom Kippur War. Sagi commanded the Golani Brigade and led a force of officers and soldiers from the brigade in Operation Entebbe. Afterwards he commanded the 36th Division, the IDF's Southern Command, the GOC Army Headquarters. In 1991 he was appointed as the chief of the Israeli Military Intelligence Directorate. Sagi retired in 1995.

== The Spy Machine ==
In 1998 he appeared in the documentary special The Spy Machine, produced by Open Media and Israfilm and shown on Channel 4.
