= Alan Alan =

British magician (1926–2014)

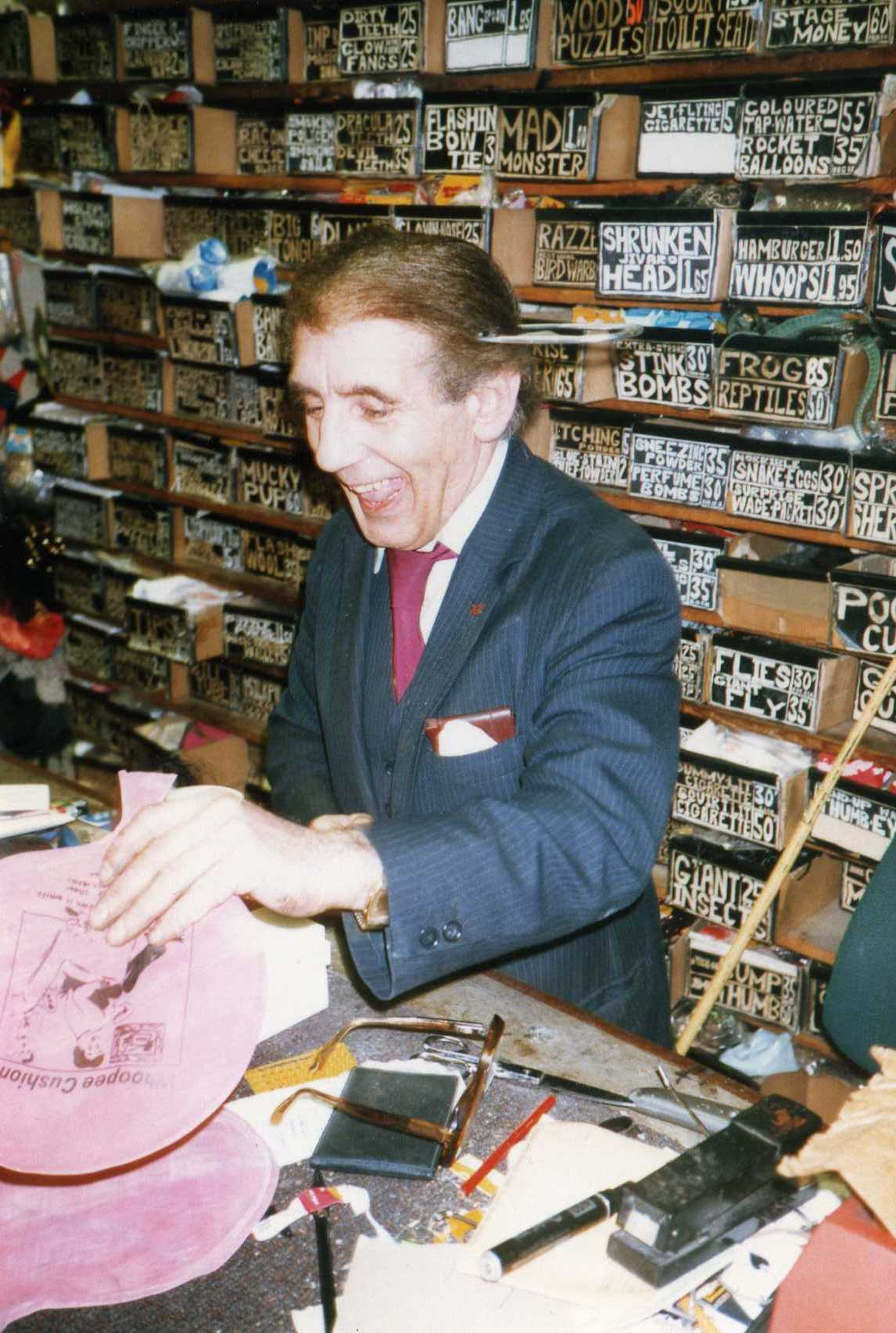
- Alan Alan at The Magic Spot
- Born: Alan Rabinowitz; 30 November 1926; London, England
- Died: 4 July 2014 (aged 87); London, England
- Occupations: escapologist and magician

Alan Alan (born Alan Rabinowitz, 30 November 1926 – 4 July 2014) was a British escapologist and magician. He originated tricks that have subsequently become familiar features of the repertoire of other performers and he was honoured by The Magic Circle.

Alan achieved fame through a series of stunts staged for the media. He made headline news in 1949 when a "buried alive" stunt, performed for Pathe News, nearly went wrong. He is credited with devising the burning-rope straitjacket escape, in which he is suspended upside-down from a crane with a length of thick rope doused with petrol; once ignited there is a short time to escape before the rope burns through.

He appeared in a number of television magic shows, including The Magic of David Copperfield. He also "taught" the inmates of Wormwood Scrubs prison how to escape from handcuffs in his performance with a number of other magicians. In more recent years he was seen on the Channel 4 TV show The Secret Cabaret with Simon Drake.

He was proprietor of Alan Alan's Magic Spot, a magic shop based on Southampton Row, London until its lease expired in the mid-1990s.

Alan's standing and influence in the world of magic was formally recognised in 2006 when The Magic Circle chose him to receive the coveted Maskelyne Award for services to British magic. He died on 4 July 2014, aged 87.
