= Andrew Lees (environmentalist) =

British environmentalist (1949–1994)

Andrew John Lees (8 June 1949 – 31 December 1994) was a scientist, and environmentalist. He was born at Sandown Nursing Home, Great Yarmouth, the eldest of the four sons of Edward Andrew Lees, who was a Great Yarmouth Borough Councillor and Hotelier and his wife Beryl Lees (née Whiteley). He studied zoology, botany and philosophy at the University of Wales in Cardiff receiving an honours degree in 1977. He then spent a period working for the Nature Conservancy Council (NCC).

In 2006 Lees was placed 43rd in the UK Environment Agency's all-time list of scientists, campaigners, writers, economists and naturalists who, in its view, have done the most to save the planet. Lees was positioned between murdered Brazilian environmentalist, Dionisio Ribeiro Filho and tropical ecologist Mike Hands.

== Lowland fens of Swansea ==
His campaigning as an environmentalist started in 1978. He started a campaign to stop tipping at Crymlyn Bog which straddles the administrative boundaries between Neath and Swansea being used as a landfill site. In 1981 working alongside Friends of the Earth, he obtained permission from the courts to proceed with a Judicial Review regarding the failure of the NCC to notify part of the bog as a protected Site of Special Scientific Interest (SSSI). The NCC conceded the case and the site was given protection. Crymlyn Bog achieved international protected status as a Ramsar Site in 1993. The northern limb of the bog, Pant-y-Sais Fen, was also protected as a result of his campaigning. It was already being filled with rubbish but working with local residents he persuaded the local council to compulsorily purchase the fen as nature reserve. This was the first, and only time a site has been purchased in this way to become a nature reserve.

== Norfolk Broads ==
He left Wales in 1981 and returned to Norfolk. In 1982 he helped form Broadlands Friends of the Earth and became its Chairman. He lobbied government and campaigned in the media over threats facing the Halvergate Marshes. In 1986, after much campaigning large areas were designated an Environmentally Sensitive Area (ESA). Later after much public pressure The Norfolk and Suffolk Broads 1988 Act was passed. It created The Broads Authority as a Special Statutory Authority which has a special duty to "conserve and enhance the natural beauty of the Broads".

== Campaigner ==
In 1985, Andrew Lees was appointed as Friends of the Earth (EWNI)'s campaigner for the countryside and pesticides and became the pollution and toxics campaigner in 1986. In 1990 Andrew became Friends of the Earth's National Campaigns Director. He was a great believer in involving local people in finding solutions to conservation issues - a technique that had been so successful at Pant y Sais.

== Madagascar ==
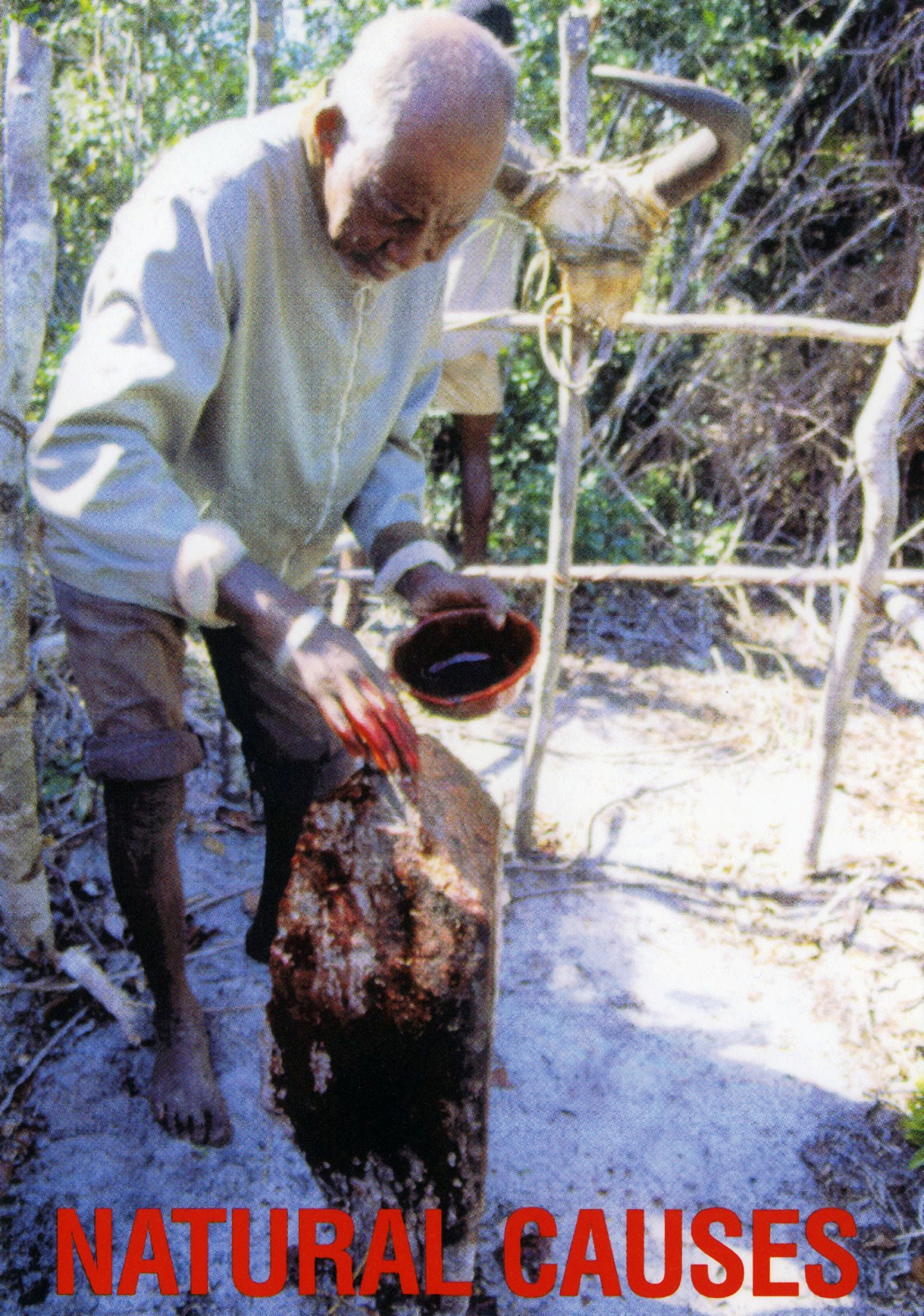
Channel 4 documentary, 1996

In 1994, he started a campaign on the littoral forests in Madagascar. QIT-Fer et Titane, a mining company owned by Rio Tinto Zinc (now the Rio Tinto Group) wanted to strip mine for titanium dioxide. Just before Christmas in 1994 he went to Madagascar to make a documentary film.

On New Year's Eve, he went into the Petriky Forest alone to shoot a final piece of film and failed to return. After an extensive search his body was found in a small clearing on 7 January. His disappearance as a prominent British environmentalist had created much media interest in the UK and there was speculation of foul play. However his camera equipment was discovered intact with his body and an autopsy showed that he died of heat exhaustion. Following his death, the Andrew Lees Trust was set up in 1995 to develop and implements social and environmental education projects. These specifically aim to involve local communities so that they can reduce their own poverty whilst conserving the valuable environmental aspects. It also helps Malagasy professionals to better plan projects at local and national level to value the unique environment of Madagascar.

By the time of his death Andrew had become a well-known figure in Britain, not only in environmental circles, but with the wider public. As a result, his obituary was carried in all the major broad-sheets. In 1996 Channel 4 broadcast a documentary called Natural Causes, made by Open Media, in which Jonathan Kaplan retraces Lees' last visit to Madagascar.

A memorial to Andrew Lees was erected by local residents at Pant-y-Sais Fen, It is in the car park which is sited where the rubbish tip was being started when the site was purchased by the council. It carries the Welsh words Da was, Da a Ffyddlon ( a Good Servant, Good and Faithful) and a quotation from him, "At some point I had to stand up and be counted. Who speaks for the butterflies?"

== Andrew Lees Trust ==
The Andrew Lees Trust charitable organisation was created in 2005 to support environmental and social projects in Madagascar.

The trust publishes environmental essays, and holds and annual essay competition.
