= The Secret Cabaret =

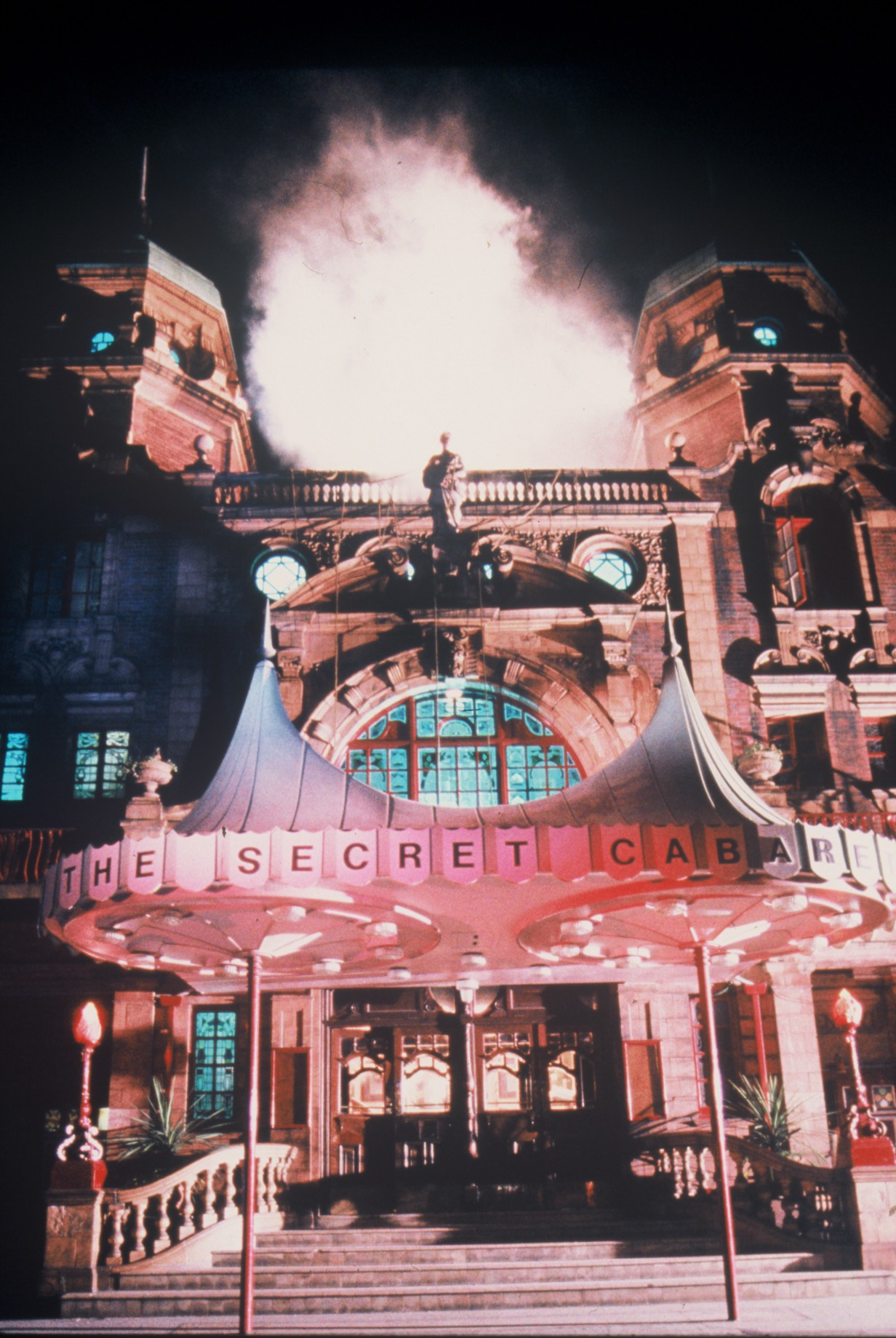
- Created by: Simon Drake; Open Media
- Country of origin: United Kingdom
- Original language: English
- No. of series: 2
- No. of episodes: 12

Production
- Executive producer: Sebastian Cody
- Producers: Frankie Glass; Jim Steinmeyer
- Running time: 30 minutes

Original release
- Network: Channel 4
- Release: 9 January 1990 – 19 February 1992

The Secret Cabaret is a magic-based television programme that ran for two series, of six episodes each, on Channel 4 in the UK during the early 1990s. Fronted by British magician Simon Drake, it was praised for giving a new and shocking twist to the presentation of illusions. In addition to various magicians the show featured sideshow acts and presentations by experts on fraud and confidence tricks, all interspersed with vintage archive footage of freak shows and daredevil stunts. It was nominated for a Royal Television Society Award and achieved an average audience of 2.53 million.

== Description and production details ==
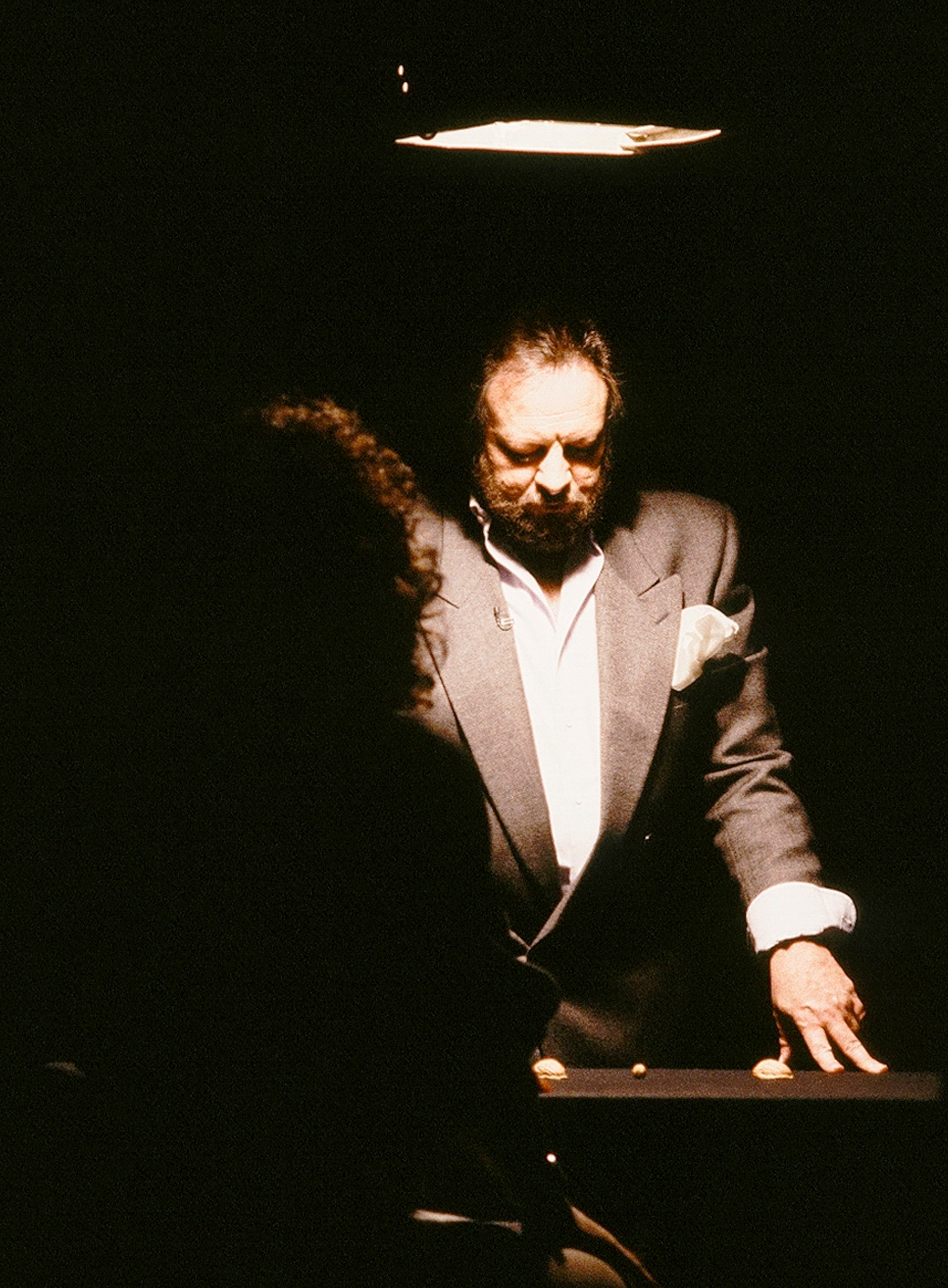
Ricky Jay performing

Each programme revolved around a theatre-based show presented by Simon Drake and featuring illusions performed by him in various guises. The styling of the show was dark and mysterious with some elements that reflected goth subculture. One of the features that gained it attention were illusion segments performed by Drake in a guise that owed much to punk and heavy metal. These sections were often embellished with realistic looking blood and gore reminiscent of the infamous performances of Peruvian magician Richiardi Jr. A substantial part of the running time of the show was given over to guest performers and various filmed items, ranging from archive footage to close-up presentations or exposures of scams and swindles.

Simon Drake is quoted as saying: "On television in the UK then, were Wayne Dobson and Paul Daniels, but they didn’t appeal to me. I wanted to see something darker, more fast-paced and rock-and-roll, more sexy, more weird."

The series had strong input from sleight-of-hand magician Ricky Jay, who made special appearances in each show and was credited as a writer. Also credited as a writer was poet and playwright Heathcote Williams. Noted illusion designer Jim Steinmeyer was credited as one of the producers.

Regular guests included magicians James Randi, Geno Munari, Max Maven and David Berglas and reformed fraudster turned security expert Frank Abagnale. This was a decade before Abagnale became world-famous through the 2002 bio-pic Catch Me If You Can produced by Steven Spielberg.

== Episodes and broadcast dates ==
=== Series 1 ===
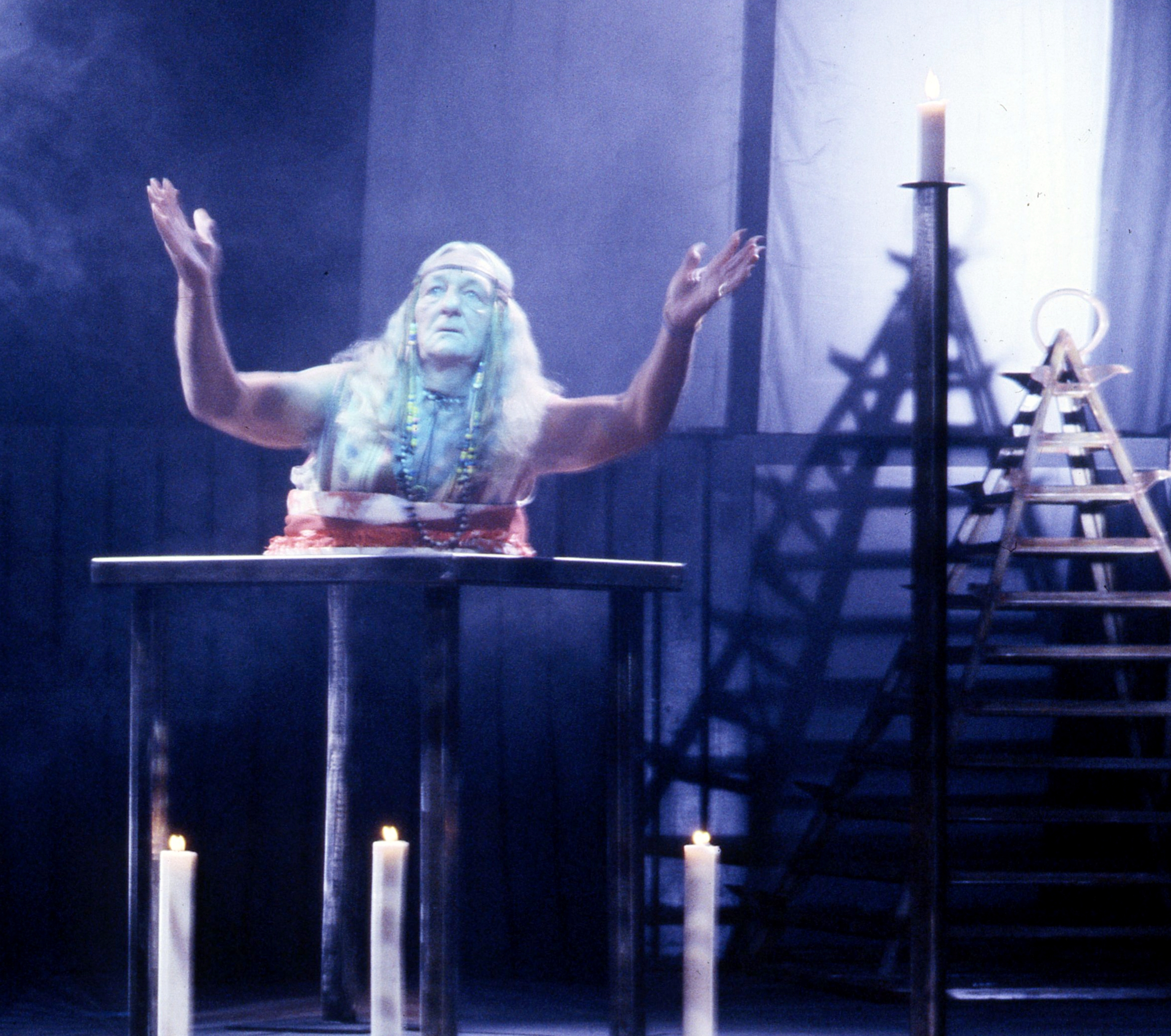
The Secret Cabaret

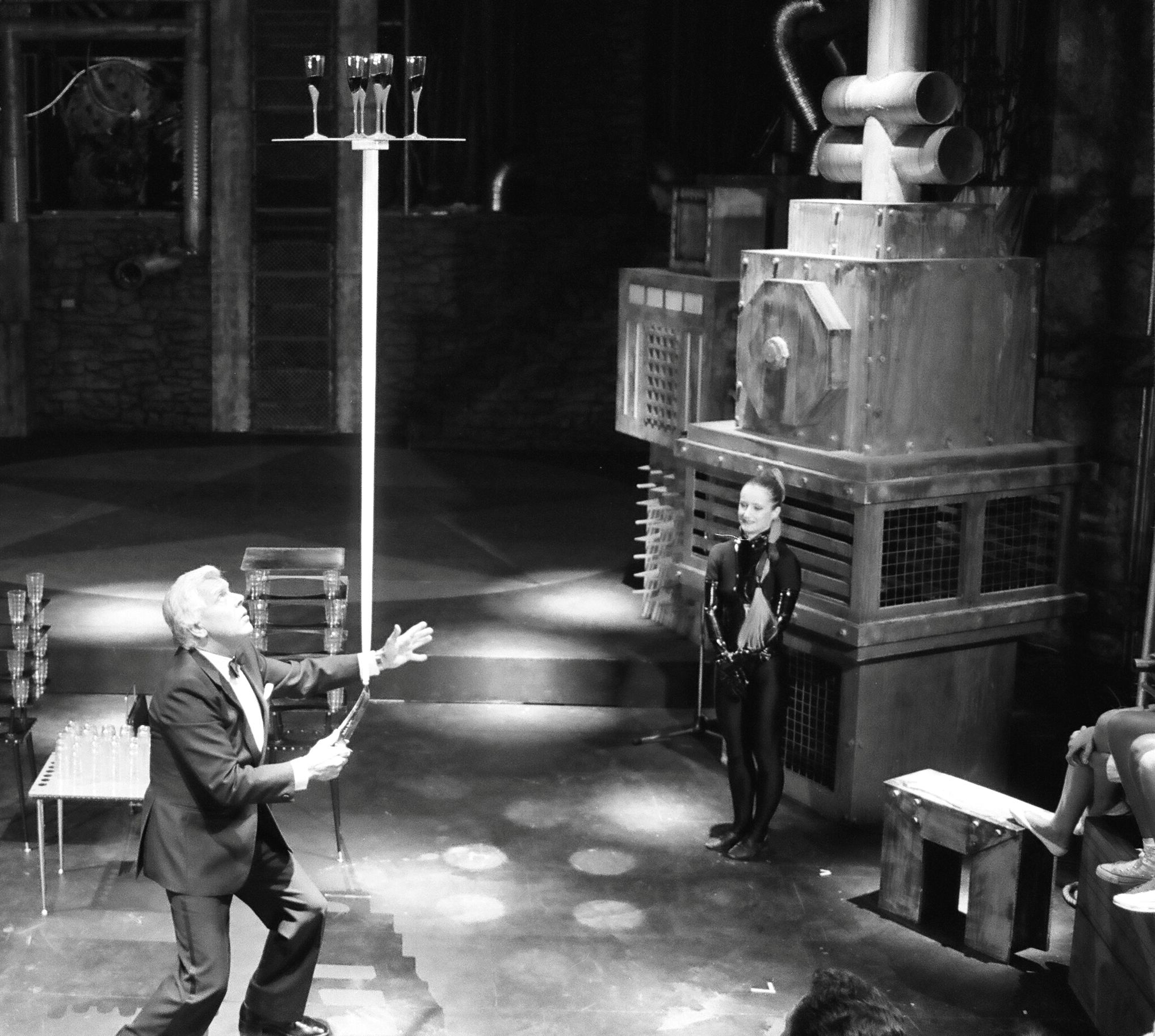
Bartschelly

- Show 1 (first broadcast 9 January 1990) – guests included contortionist Rocky Rendall, ghost hunter Tony Ehlert and knife jugglers Carletti & Belle.
- Show 2 (first broadcast 16 January 1990) – guests included Mike Comerford, Mark Raffles and Fluke.
- Show 3 (first broadcast 23 January 1990) – guests included Les Hilton, strongwoman Jeanin Lionet, Tony Andruzzi, Stromboli and John Gaughan.
- Show 4 (first broadcast 30 January 1990) – guests included Bartschelly, Jenny Randles and John Gaughan
- Show 5 (first broadcast 6 February 1990) – guests included trapeze artist Sue Brent, Charlie Marsden & Lloyd Williams, vaudevillian Jay Marshall, escapologist Alan Alan and vampire hunter Sean Manchester.
- Show 6 (first broadcast 13 February 1990) – guests included Watt the Man, Normando Rojas, Tony Andruzzi and Rocky Rendall.

=== Series 2 ===
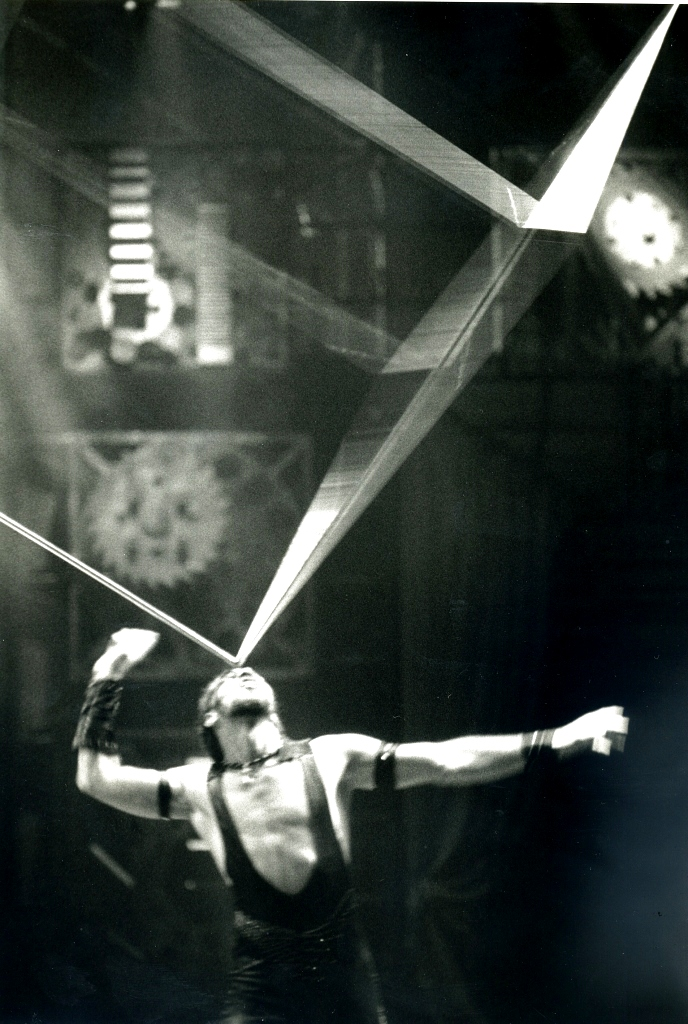
Tkach

- Show 1 (first broadcast 15 January 1992) – guests included Matthew Gryczan, Jeanie, Named Seuqcaj and Enrica.
- Show 2 (first broadcast 22 January 1992) – guests included Tkach, Charles Black, Snake Lady and La Dorina.
- Show 3 (first broadcast 29 January 1992) – guests included Stevie Starr, Len Di Maggio and Staubertis.
- Show 4 (first broadcast 5 February 1992) – guests included Max Oscar, Bessie Standing, Matthew Gryczan and Named Seuqcaj.
- Show 5 (first broadcast 12 February 1992) – guests included Elvis Mokko, Tony Zavosky, Anne Marie Bates and David Benn.
- Show 6 (first broadcast 19 February 1992) – guests included The Mandragores, Percilla & Emmitt Bejano, Jonny King, and Matthew Gryczan.

=== Other broadcasts ===
During the 25th anniversary of Channel 4 in autumn 2007, The Secret Cabaret was shown again on More4 during the celebratory season.

== Other credits ==
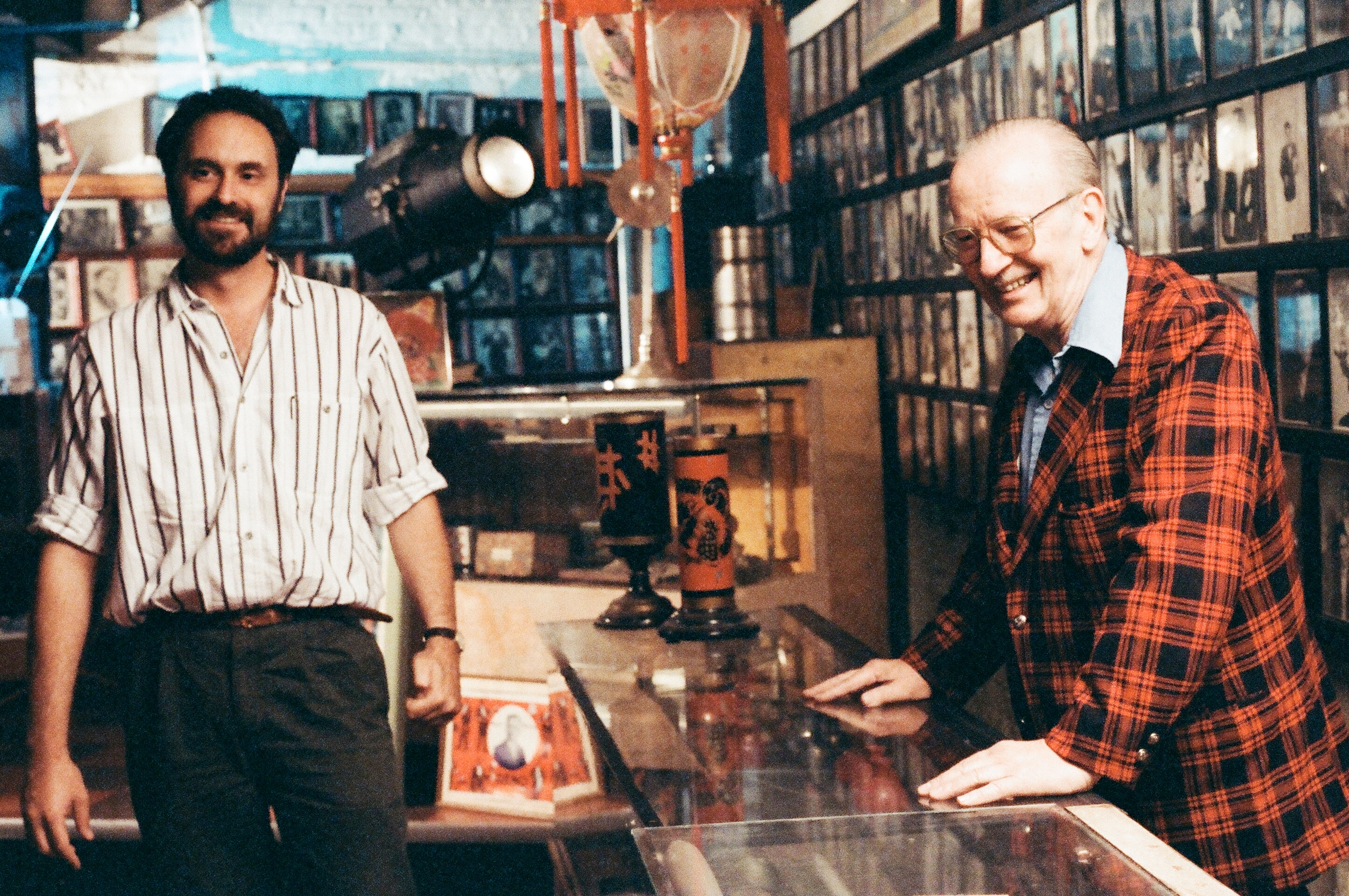
Producer Jim Steinmeyer (left) with Jay Marshall

In addition to those named above, the following appeared in various end credits:

On-screen cast

- Sarah Jane Cresswell
- Juliette Hardy
- Anthony Georghiou
- Peter Mandell
- Joanne Robley Dixon
- Desmond Williams
- Frances Wingate
- Charlotte Chatton
- Sue Brent
- Ann Pownall
- Helen Bee

Production personnel

- Researchers (series 1): David Britland and Isabel MacIver
- Researchers (series 2): David Britland and Sarah Wynn Parry
- Film researcher: Cy Young
- Additional magic (series 1)/Magic consultant (series 2): Patrick Page
- Costume Designer: Robin Betts
- Makeup (series 2): Nosh
- Original music: Robert Lockhart
- Music Producer: Graeme Pleeth
- Sound designer: Nigel Holland
- Choreographer (series 2): Jonathan Thrift
- Designer: Ray Oxley
- Titles: Willy Smax
- Lighting designer: Simon Rickman
- Theatre director (series 1): Vincent Stafford
- Theatre director (series 2): Don Coutts
- Director: Sebastian Harris
- Executive producer: Sebastian Cody
- Producers: Frankie Glass and Jim Steinmeyer
