= Hippodrome (disambiguation) =

A hippodrome was an ancient Grecian horse and chariot racing course and arena. Hippodrome or Hipódromo may also refer to:

== Geography ==
- Hipódromo (Asunción), a district of Asunción, Paraguay
- Hippodrome, Bamako, a quartier of Bamako, the capital of Mali
- Covered Hippodrome, part of the Great Palace of Constantinople in Istanbul, Turkey
- Hippodrome of Constantinople (Greek: Ἱππόδρομος τῆς Κωνσταντινουπόλεως, romanized: Hippódromos tēs Kōnstantinoupóleōs), a circus that was the sporting and social centre of Constantinople, capital of the Byzantine Empire; today a square named Sultanahmet Meydanı (Sultan Ahmet Square) in Istanbul, Turkey, with a few fragments of the original structure surviving.
- Roman Hippodrome of Beirut, an historic Jewish quarter of Beirut, Lebanon

== Arenas and entertainment venues ==
=== Argentina ===
- Hipodromo Argentino de Palermo, a horse racing venue in Buenos Aires
- Hipódromo de San Isidro, a horse racing track in San Isidro, Buenos Aires

=== Belgium ===
- Hippodrome Wellington, a horse racing track in Ostend

=== Canada ===
- Hippodrome de Montréal, now Blue Bonnets (raceway)

=== Estonia ===
- Tallinna Hipodroom, a harness racing track in Tallinn

=== France ===
- Auteuil Hippodrome, a horse-racing venue in Paris
- Hippodrome de Pantin, a former circus and concert venue in Paris
- Hippodrome de Vincennes, used for horse racing and pop music concerts
- Hippodrome de Chantilly, see Chantilly Racecourse
- Hippodrome Deauville-La Touques, see Deauville-La Touques Racecourse
- Hippodrome de Longchamp, see Longchamp Racecourse
- Hippodrome de Marseille Borely, see Marseille Borely Racecourse

=== Lebanon ===
- Hippodrome du parc de Beyrouth, also known as Beirut Hippodrome, a horse racing facility

=== Romania ===
- Craiova Hippodrome, an equestrian facility in the Nicolae Romanescu Park in Craiova

=== Russia ===
- Central Moscow Hippodrome, a horse racing track in Moscow

=== Slovenia ===
- Ljubljana Hippodrome, a horse racing stadium in Ljubljana

=== Turkey ===
- Adana Yeşiloba Hippodrome, a racetrack in Seyhan, Adana

=== United Kingdom ===
- The Hippodrome, a demolished theatre in Aldershot in Hampshire
- Aston Hippodrome, a demolished theatre in Aston, Birmingham
- Birmingham Hippodrome, a theatre in Birmingham
- Brighton Hippodrome, an entertainment venue in Brighton and Hove, currently in disuse
- Bristol Hippodrome, a theatre in Bristol
- Dudley Hippodrome, a former theatre in Dudley, West Midlands
- Golders Green Hippodrome, a former BBC building in North London
- Great Yarmouth Hippodrome, a venue in Norfolk, and Britain's only surviving total circus building; one of three in the world
- Hippodrome Cinema, Bo'ness, Falkirk
- Hulme Hippodrome, a theatre in Manchester
- Playhouse Theatre, Manchester, once used as a recording venue by the BBC, has also been known as the Hulme Hippodrome
- Hippodrome, London, now a casino; but had other uses during the building's existence
- Kensington Hippodrome, a former race course in Notting Hill, London
- Pendle Hippodrome Theatre, in Colne, Lancashire
- Queen's Park Hippodrome, a demolished theatre in Harpurhey, Manchester
- Royal Hippodrome Theatre, a theatre in Eastbourne
- Southend Hippodrome, (latterly Gaumont Cinema), a demolished theatre in Southend, UK, see Bertie Crewe
- Hippodrome Theatre (formerly the Gordon Theatre, Stoke-on-Trent) a demolished theatre in Staffordshire
- Tameside Hippodrome, a theatre in Ashton-under-Lyne, Greater Manchester

=== United States ===
- Hippodrome Theatre (Baltimore), a theatre in Maryland
- Hippodrome Theater (Cleveland, Ohio), now demolished
- Hippodrome State Theatre, Gainesville, Florida
- New York Hippodrome (1905–1939), a demolished theatre
- Great Roman Hippodrome (New York), later Madison Square Garden (I), now demolished
- Hippodrome (Memphis), a skating rink and later music venue, now demolished
- Hippodrome Theater (Richmond, Virginia)
- Hippodrome Theatre (Terre Haute, Indiana)
- Julia Sanderson Theater, Springfield, Massachusetts, once a nightclub known as the Hippodrome
- Hippodrome (Waco, Texas), listed on the NRHP in Texas
- The Hippodrome, an arena in Waterloo, Iowa
- North Augusta Hippodrome, North Augusta, South Carolina
- Santa Monica Looff Hippodrome, a carousel on the Newcomb Pier, Santa Monica
- Shea's Hippodrome Theatre, Buffalo, NY (1914-1983) renamed Center Theatre

=== Venezuela ===
- La Rinconada Hippodrome, a race track in Coche, Caracas
