= Open Media =

British television production company

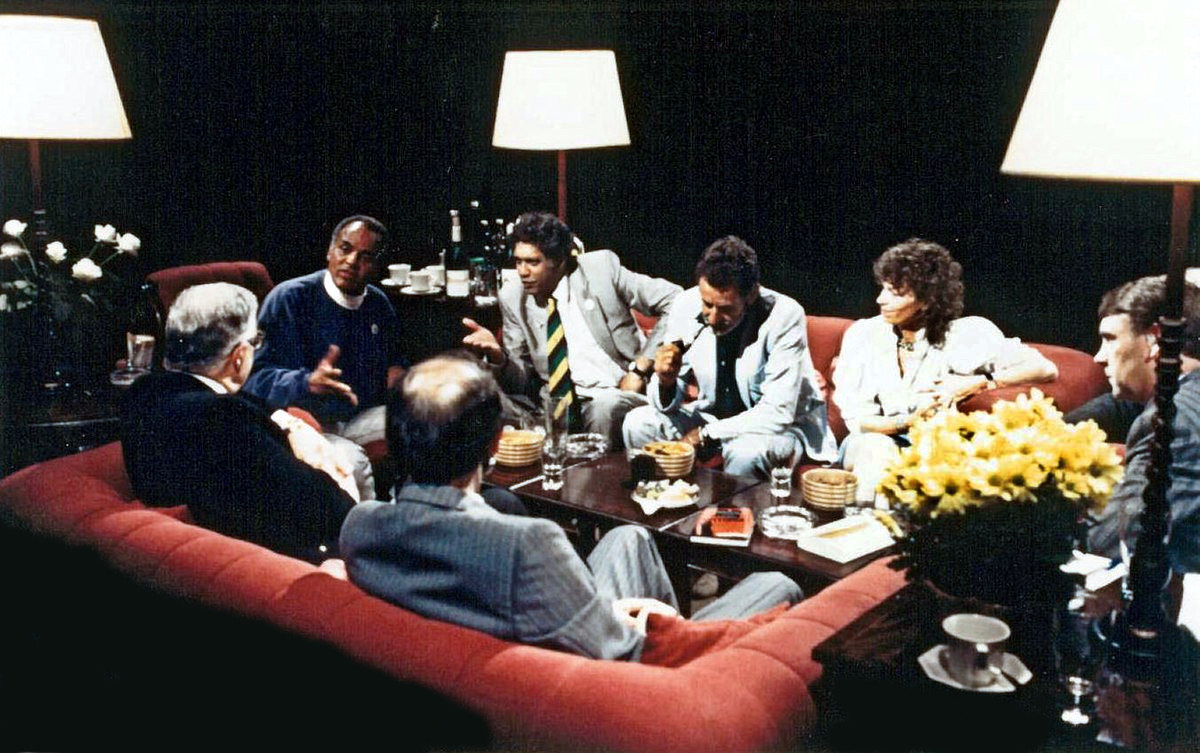
After Dark with Harry Belafonte, Denis Worrall, Breyten Breytenbach and others

Open Media is a British television production company, best known for the discussion series After Dark, described in the national press as "the most original programme on television".

The company was founded in 1987 and has produced more than 400 hours of television for major UK broadcasters, including the BBC, ITV and Channel 4. It has made entertainment series and factual specials which have sold all over the world. It also produces communications and corporate media for some of Britain's most important businesses.

Open Media programmes have been nominated for many awards by the Royal Television Society and the British Academy BAFTA.

Two different Open Media productions were featured during the 25th anniversary of Channel 4 in autumn 2007: The Secret Cabaret and After Dark were shown again on More4 during the celebratory season.

In 2009 the British Film Institute announced that Open Media, in partnership with The National Archives, the Parliamentary Broadcasting Unit, FremantleMedia and the BBC, makes programmes available online through 'InView' as "examples of how some of Britain's key social, political and economic issues have been represented and debated".

In 2010 the Open Media series Opinions and After Dark were praised as "two of the best talk-shows ever seen on British television" in a well-reviewed book of social and cultural history. In 2012 After Dark featured prominently in a number of two-page tributes in British newspapers on the occasion of the 30th anniversary of Channel 4 and in 2016 The Herald wrote "Unlike reality television live feeds today, After Dark was essential viewing, with some very serious talk enlivened even more by unexpected events." In 2020 The Guardian listed After Dark as one of the "jewels" in the history of television.

The company recently announced it had digitised its archive to make extracts from all its programmes available to the film, television and advertising industries: "Interviews, talk shows, magic and entertainment shows featuring hundreds of hours of personalities from all over the world who made rare appearances on our programmes, rare because they did not appear elsewhere on television; or only very occasionally and not at such length; or they weren't subject to such focussed scrutiny as our formats gave them."

== Stars ==
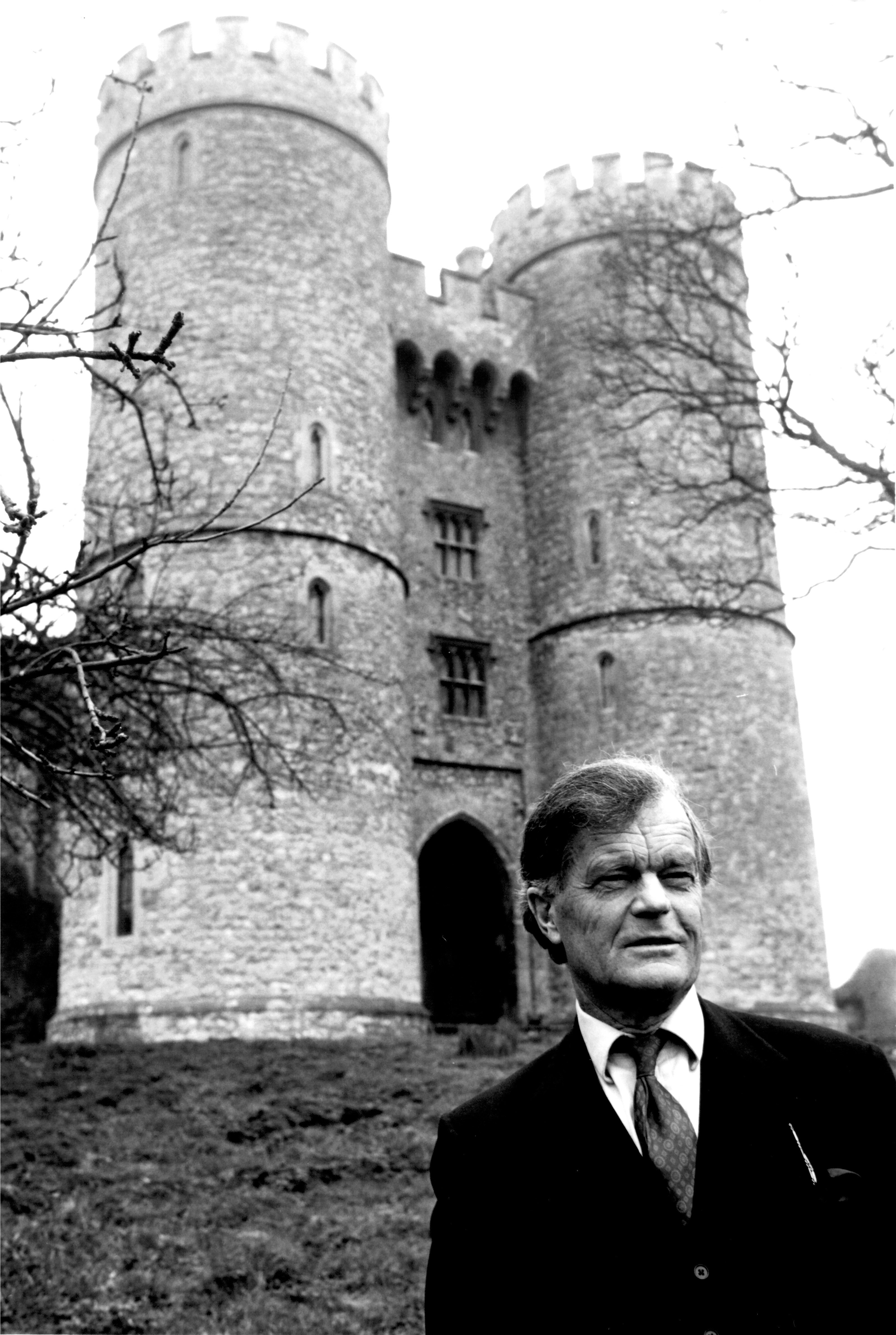
Alan Clark - Opinions

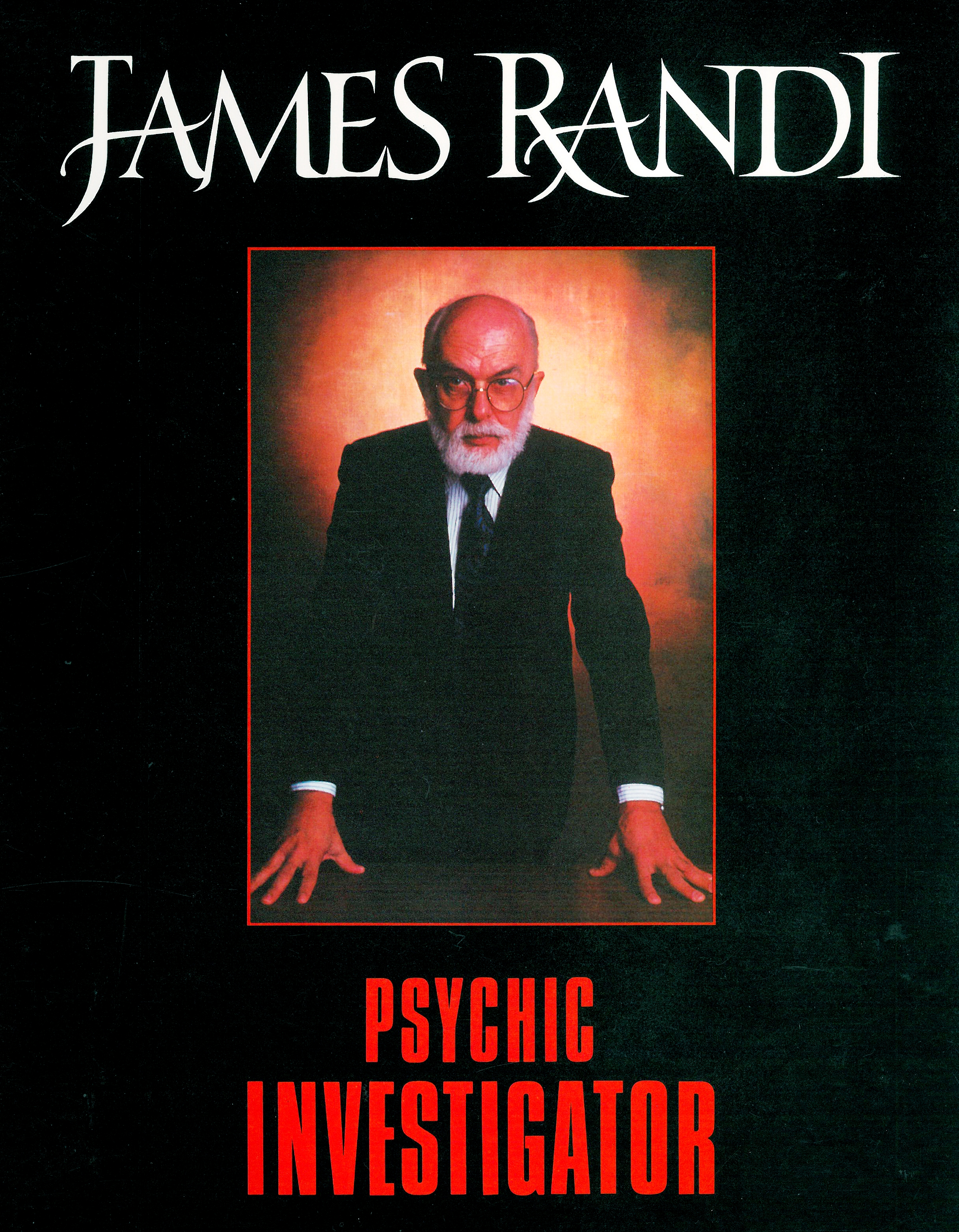
James Randi - ITV series

After Dark featured appearances by such well-known figures as Buzz Aldrin, Andrea Dworkin, Patricia Highsmith, Shere Hite, David Irving, Bianca Jagger, Christine Keeler, Adnan Khashoggi, Bruce Oldfield, Edward Teller and Peter Ustinov.

The two series of Is This Your Life? featured extended and in-depth interviews with among others Jeremy Beadle, Morris Cerullo, Max Clifford, Germaine Greer, Olivia Newton-John, Jimmy Savile, and Peter Tatchell: "a must-see, the most incisive chat show on the box".

Open Media has produced talks by such figures as Edward de Bono, Brian Cox, Linda Colley, James Goldsmith, Paul Hill, Dusan Makavejev, G.F. Newman, Andrew Roberts, George Soros and Norman Stone. One such – an Opinions talk for Channel 4 in 1993 by Alan Clark – was described in his diary (later published) as "It was good. Clear, assured, moving. I looked compos and in my 'prime'. Many people saw it. All were enthusiastic. Today acres of coverage in The Times." Another Opinions talk – by Dennis Potter, also in 1993 – was given a cinema screening by the BFI in July 2014.

Among those appearing in a Channel 4 Opinions debate in Westminster Central Hall about democracy in Britain chaired by Vincent Hanna were Zaki Badawi, Christopher Hitchens, Paul Kennedy, Michael Mansfield, Geoff Mulgan, Vincent Nichols, Jonathan Sacks, Nancy Seear and Crispin Tickell.

Sportspeople appearing on Open Media programmes include Ian Botham, Fatima Whitbread and John Fashanu. Musicians appearing include Harry Belafonte, Eartha Kitt, Yehudi Menuhin, Sinéad O'Connor and Abdullah Ibrahim. Comedians appearing include Harry Enfield, Jerry Sadowitz, Sandi Toksvig, Ian Hislop, Tony Slattery, Barry Cryer and John Wells. Magicians include Simon Drake, Ricky Jay and James Randi. Politicians appearing include Edward Heath, Richard Perle, Edwina Currie, Albert Reynolds, David Miliband, David Steel, Roy Jenkins, Denis Healey, Peter Hain, David Mellor, Teresa Gorman, Roy Hattersley, Paul Boateng, Gerald Kaufman, Enoch Powell, Merlyn Rees, Tony Benn and Bernadette McAliskey.

Mary Beard made an early television appearance in 1994 on an Open Media discussion for the BBC, Weird Thoughts.

== Productions ==
=== Entertainment ===
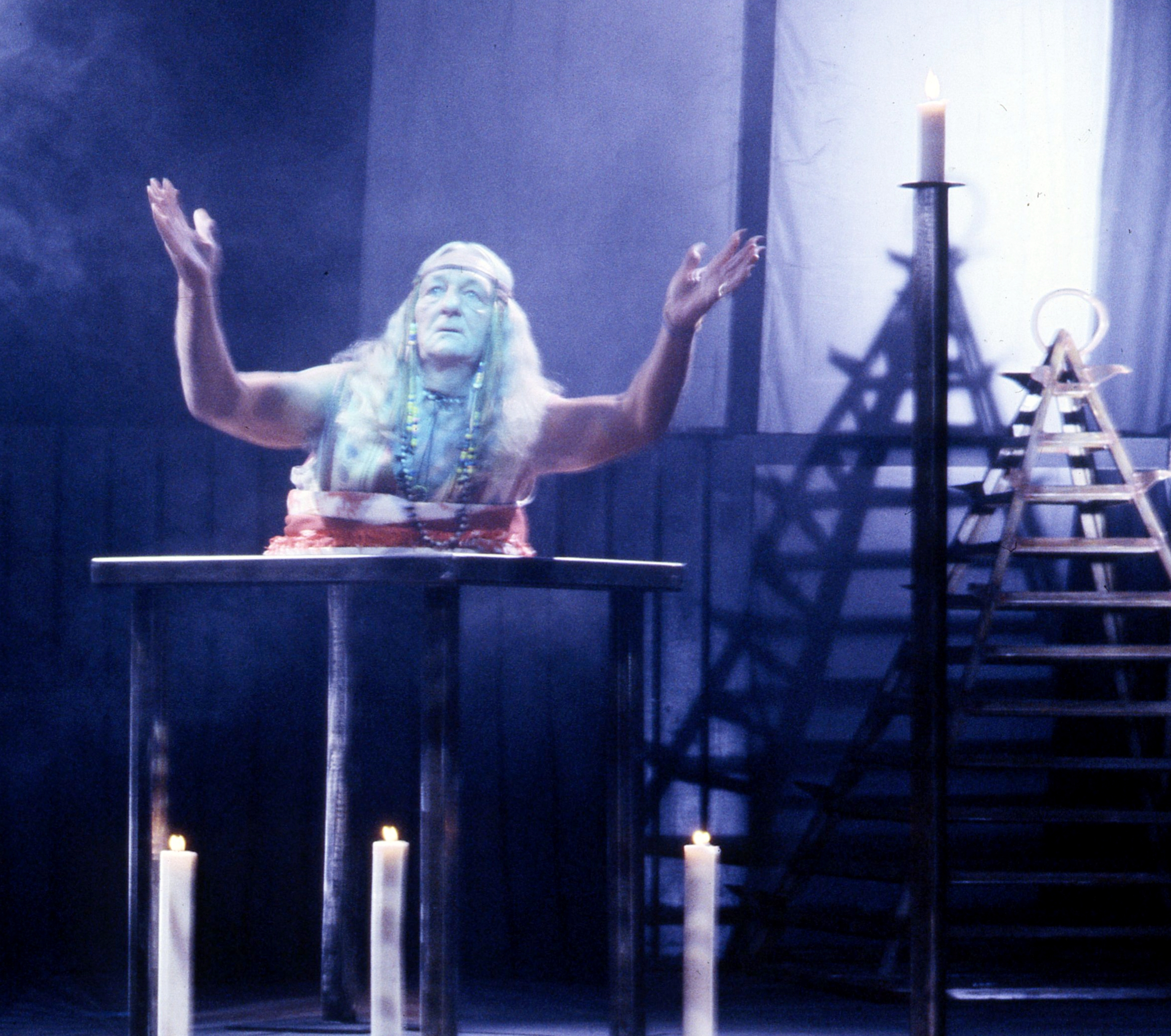
The Secret Cabaret

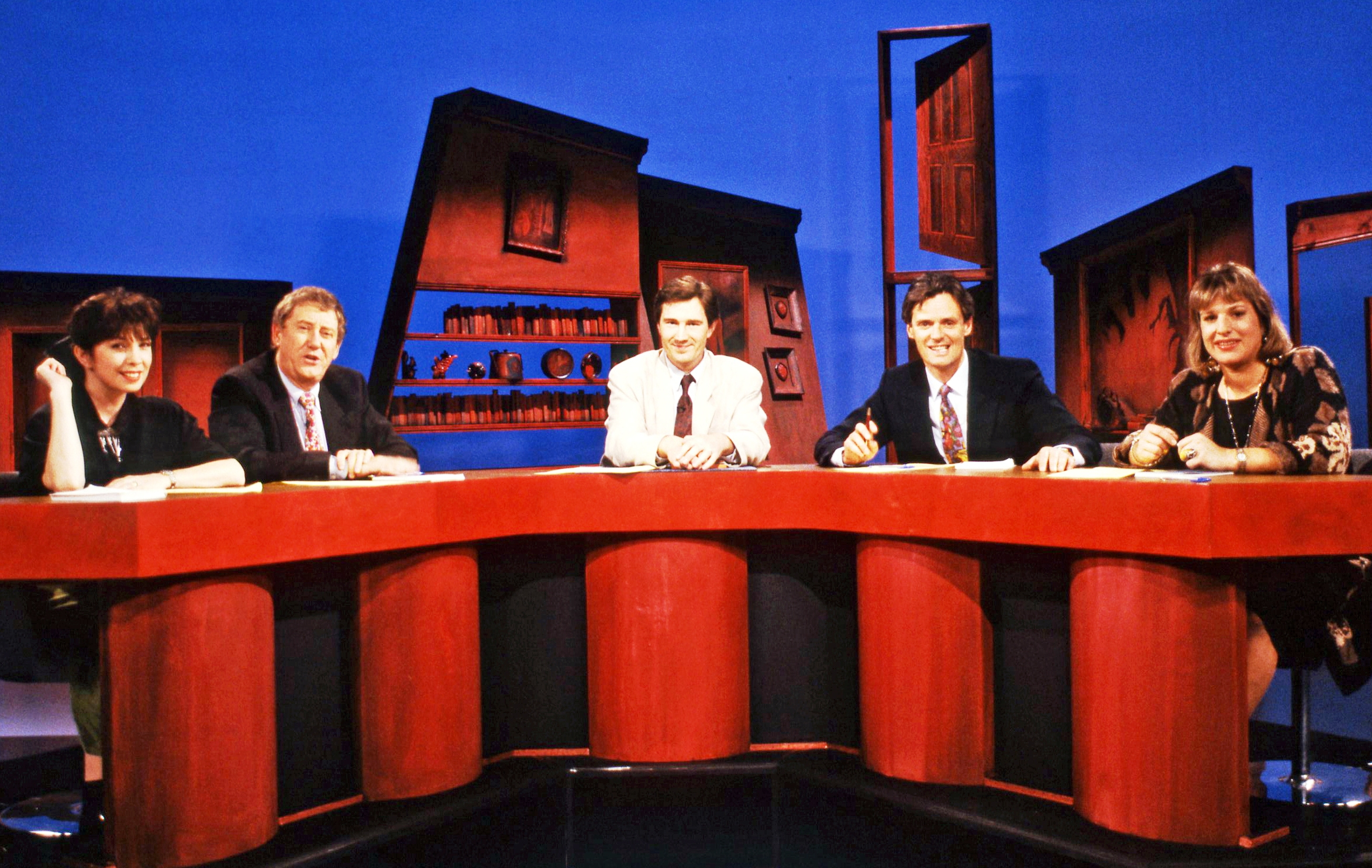
Don't Quote Me, Geoffrey Perkins with guests including Austin Mitchell, Carol Thatcher and Simon Williams, Channel 4 1990

Entertainment series include The Secret Cabaret and Don't Quote Me, hosted by Geoffrey Perkins and described as "forerunner to Have I Got News for You and every other comedy panel show thereafter".

=== Factual ===
Factual series and specials include

- After Dark
- Brave New World
- The Great Pot Debate
- The Greatest F***ing Show on TV ("comic Jerry Sadowitz argues for more bad language on TV", "probably contains the greatest number of swear words ever uttered on British TV")
- Is This Your Life?
- James Randi: Psychic Investigator
- John Wells and the Three Wise Men
- Natural Causes
- Opinions
- Orient: Club for a Fiver
- The Spy Machine
- Suez: A Personal View by historian Andrew Roberts
- The Talking Show with Sandi Toksvig

as well as various films for Channel 4's Equinox, e.g. Secrets of the Super Psychics, Superpowers? and Theme Park Heaven. Another Open Media film for Equinox - The Big Sleep - was the subject of a lengthy article in 2022.

The company mounted an unusual discussion - Weird Thoughts for BBC2 - in 1994. This was characterised in an article in 2021 as follows: "Weird Thoughts, where Tony Wilson chairs a panel of experts debating why the 1990s seem so very strange. There are a lot of familiar faces here – the late James Randi, Fortean Times founder Bob Rickard, esoteric scholar Lynn Picknett – but today the biggest name is the one hovering around the back of the gathering: a young Mary Beard."

One of the company's documentary specials – The Mediator – was described in the British Medical Journal as providing "a new clinical role for a community psychiatrist – namely, healing rifts between gangs of aggressive young men in two neighbourhoods...a lively and well reasoned example of what can be done by a professional with group and family mediation skills." A documentary on advertising agency M&C Saatchi required two months filming: "The brief was to expand on ideas from the company's manifesto...It's the first time the Saatchi breakaway has allowed unrestricted access behind scenes."

== See also ==
- After Dark
- List of After Dark editions
- Opinions
- The Secret Cabaret
- Secrets of the Psychics
- The Spy Machine
- Anthony Clare
- Uri Geller
- Jonathan Kaplan
- Helena Kennedy
- Sinéad O'Connor
- Dennis Potter
- James Randi
- Jerry Sadowitz
- Gordon Thomas
- John Underwood
- Tony Wilson
- Leyton Orient F.C.
