= Mark Raffles =

English magician (1922–2022)

- Born: Albert Taylor; 22 January 1922; Hulme, Manchester, England
- Died: 18 September 2022 (aged 100)
- Occupation: Magician
- Known for: Pickpocketing and disappearing dog acts

Mark Raffles (born Albert Taylor, 22 January 1922 – 18 September 2022) was a British magician famous for his pickpocket and disappearing dog acts.

== Early life and career ==
Mark Raffles was born Albert Taylor on 22 January 1922 in Hulme, Manchester. He initially struggled with a speech defect and a stammer and was schooled in magic by an uncle. He started a silent magic act, under the stage name Ray St. Clair, at the Queen's Park Hippodrome at age 16. The severe stammer prevented him from joining the army at the start of World War II. He worked for a time as a bricklayer, building air raid shelters. He joined the Entertainments National Service Association (ENSA) in 1941 and spent the next three years entertaining troops, developing his pickpocket act during this time. He received the Veteran's Badge for his service.

== Later life and death ==
He appeared in the movie Cup-tie Honeymoon along with Sandy Powell in 1948. He met the dancer Joan Cleare in pantomime in Bilston later that year and married her. He changed his stage name to Mark Raffles, after the gentleman thief character Arthur Raffles. He performed in various clubs, cruises, corporate events and also made television appearances, including one in 3-2-1. He briefly retired due to heart problems, but in the 1970s, he and Joan were persuaded by their friends Jack and Audrey Shaw to take over their dog act, called The Wychwoods.

He was a member of the Inner Magic Circle and served as the president of the International Brotherhood of Magicians in 2005. In 2019, he retired to the Queen Elizabeth Court, a care home in Llandudno. He died on 18 September 2022, at the age of 100.
