= Jonathan Kaplan (writer) =

South Africa-born medical doctor and writer

Jonathan Kaplan (born 1956) is a South Africa-born medical doctor and writer. He received his medical training in South Africa, Great Britain, and the United States. He is the author of two autobiographical books on war surgery in developing countries and related matters. He also publishes occasional book reviews in the Financial Times.

== Bibliography ==
- Kaplan, Jonathan (2003). The Dressing Station: A Surgeon's Chronicle of War and Medicine. Grove Press. ISBN 0-8021-3962-0.
- Kaplan, Jonathan (2006). Contact Wounds: A War Surgeon's Education. Grove Press. ISBN 0-8021-4278-8.

== Television ==
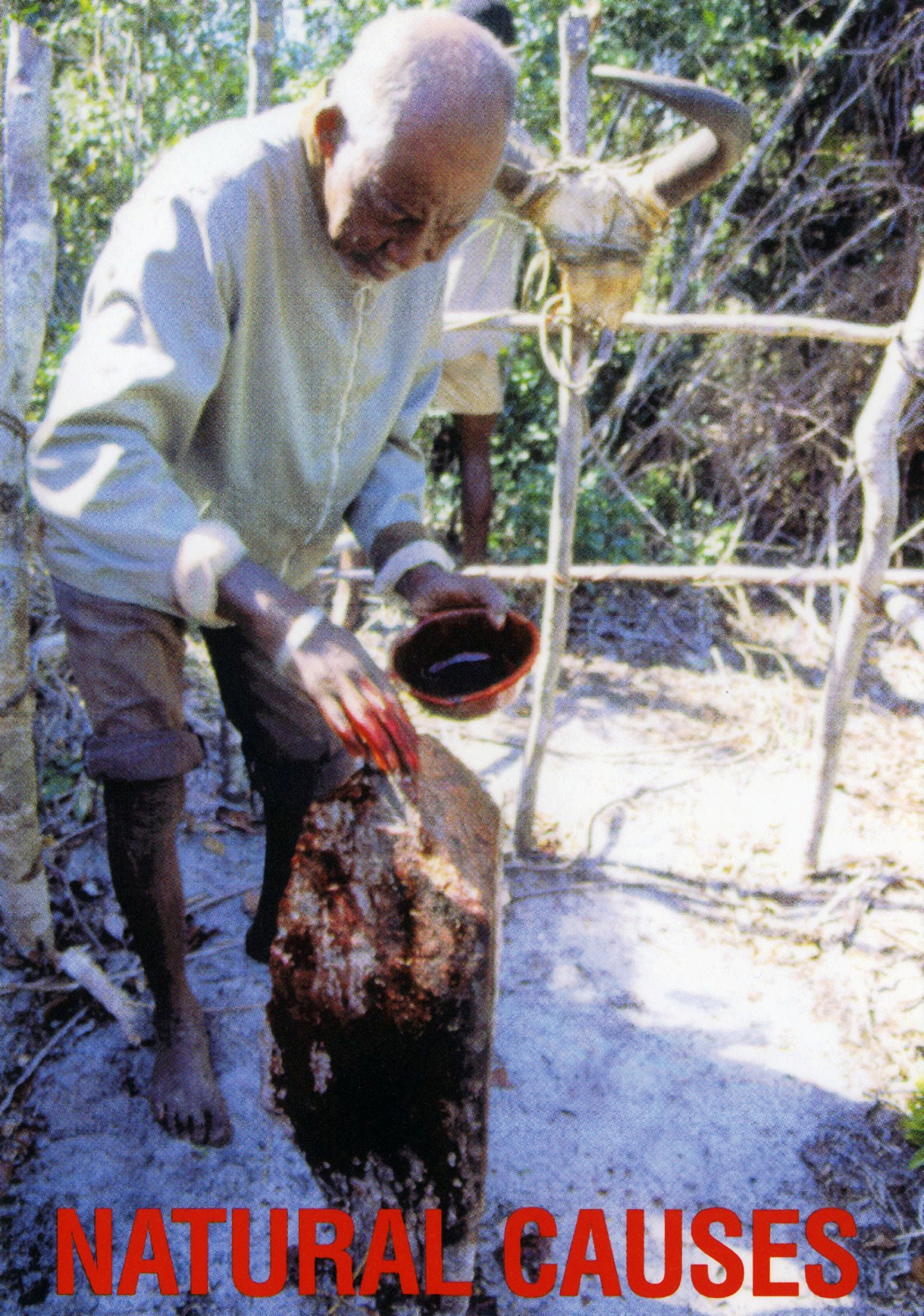
Andrew Lees documentary, 1996

In 1996 Kaplan produced and directed a television documentary Natural Causes, made by Open Media for the War Cries strand on Channel 4. The BFI summarises this film as follows: "Jonathan Kaplan retraces the footsteps of his close friend, Andrew Lees, who died apparently from natural causes whilst investigating the huge titanium mining operations in south-east Madagascar."

== Awards ==
- 2002 Alan Paton Award
