= Opinions (TV series) =

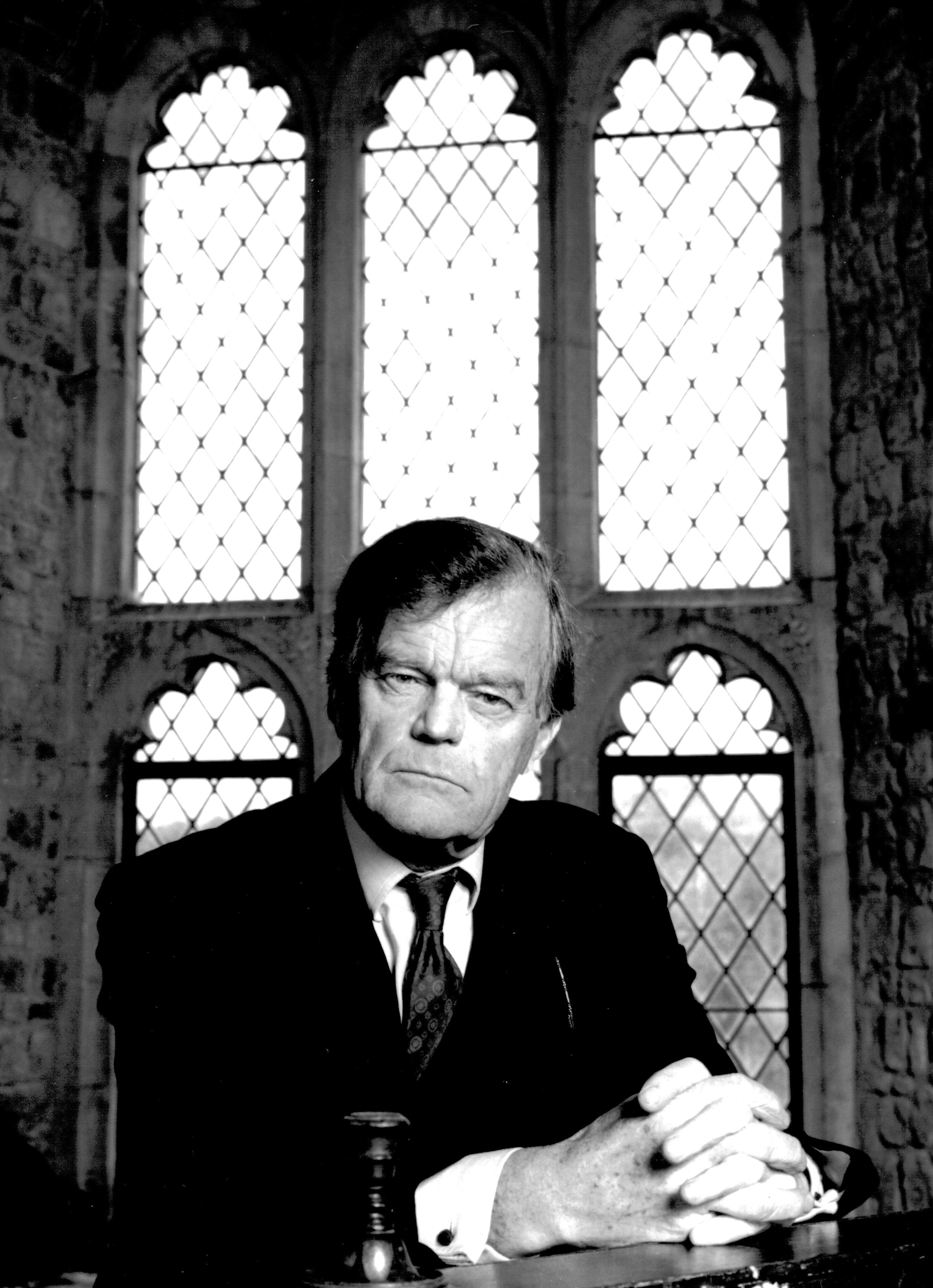
- Politician and author Alan Clark appearing on Opinions in 1993
- Genre: Talk show
- Country of origin: United Kingdom

Production
- Running time: 30 minutes

Original release
- Network: Channel 4

Opinions is a British talk programme broadcast on Channel 4 television in the 1980s and 1990s. According to Time magazine, Opinions gave "a public figure 30-minutes of airtime each week to expound on a controversial topic (Germaine Greer on Margaret Thatcher, Edward Teller on nuclear defence)". "A speaker could express his or her own views straight to camera for 30 minutes" "an earnest of Channel 4's faith and mission to bring edgy, alternative fare to the public and to excite reaction". "Individuals like the novelist Salman Rushdie and the historian EP Thompson each spoke to the camera for half an hour on a subject that interested them".

During the time it was produced by Open Media, the series featured such figures as Edward de Bono, Alan Clark, Linda Colley, Brian Cox, James Goldsmith, Paul Hill, Dusan Makavejev, G.F. Newman, George Soros and Norman Stone. One – by Dennis Potter, in 1993 – was given a cinema screening by the BFI in July 2014.

Among those appearing in the Opinions 1993 debate in Westminster Central Hall about democracy in Britain chaired by Vincent Hanna were Zaki Badawi, Christine Crawley, Paul Ekins, Christopher Hitchens, Paul Kennedy, Michael Mansfield, David Miliband, Geoff Mulgan, Vincent Nichols, Janet Paraskeva, Jonathan Sacks, Nancy Seear, Roger Scruton, Anthony Smith and Crispin Tickell.
