= The Spy Machine =

UK television special

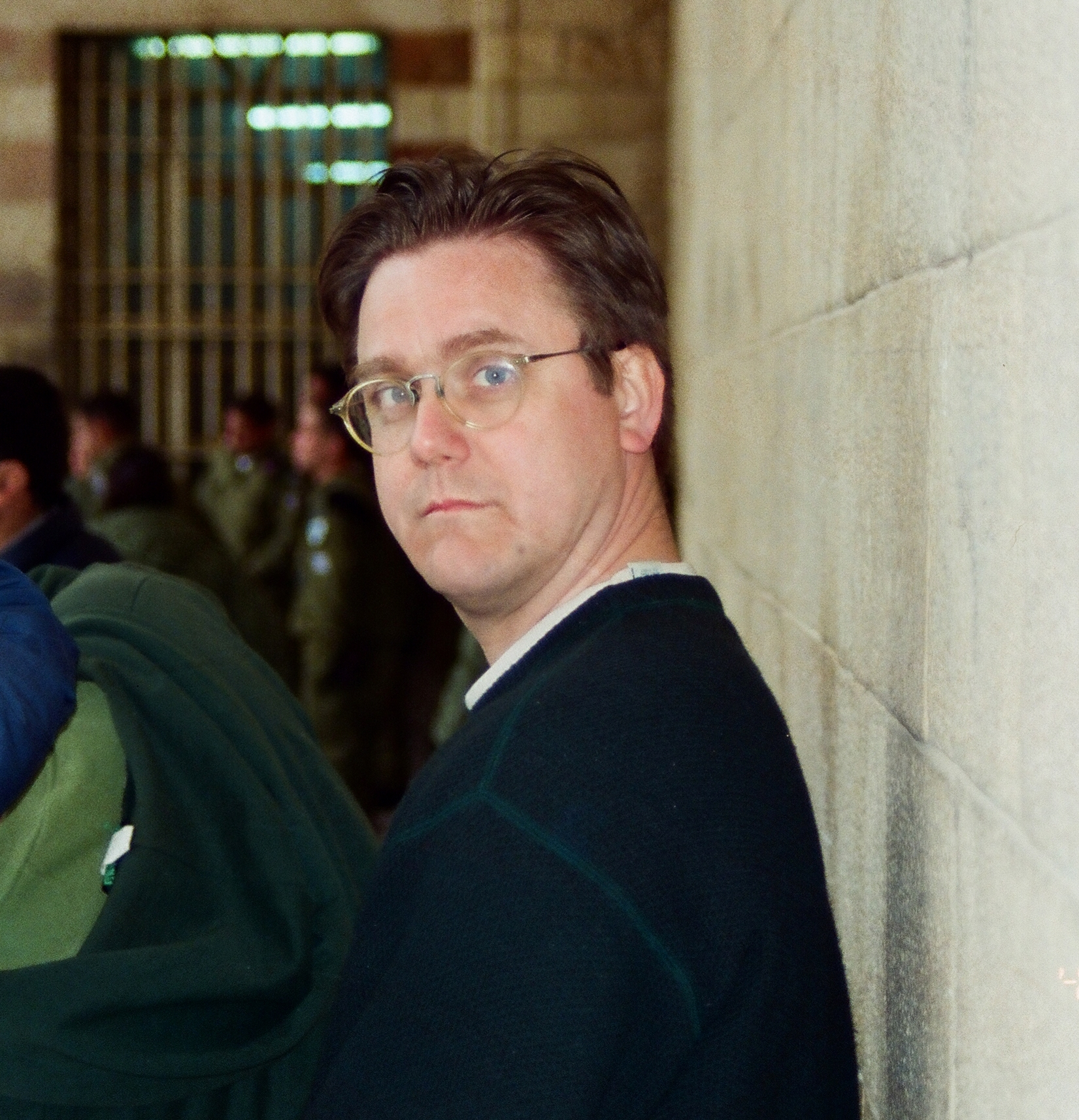
Per-Eric Hawthorne on location in Israel during filming

The Spy Machine is a UK documentary special about the work of the Mossad, written and narrated by Gordon Thomas.

It was made by Open Media and Israfilm and first broadcast by Channel 4 in May 1998. The producer/director was Per-Eric Hawthorne.

== Reception ==
The Observer said:

Israel 50: The Spy Machine serves as a clear reminder that Israel is just another country deploying the same old methods to maintain power. Elderly agents of Mossad reminisce, just like their counterparts in MI6 or the CIA, about the good old days of the Cold War, when they had free rein to infiltrate and assassinate state enemies...The killing of Abu Jihad, Arafat's right-hand man, was the last straw for the politicians, who realised when the Oslo negotiations began that Jihad would have been a very valuable asset for Israeli interests...But Ehud Barak, ex-Mossad agent and now leader of the Labour Party suggests that the best way to gather information is to listen to the BBC and read a newspaper.

The Times described the film:

Channel 4's "Israel 50" strand has covered an impressive range of aspects of that nation's life and history, but this must have been the most chilling...A string of former supreme heads of Israeli Intelligence, heads and deputy heads of Mossad and former agents talked with disconcerting frankness about their operations...Rafi Eitan, who snatched Eichmann, would have killed him instantly if a problem had arisen...This was a sympathetic film, which began with a haunting visit to a secret Mossad memorial in the form of an elaborate maze. Here the names of agents tortured, killed or simply disappeared are carved in shaded stone walls. Their daring, efficiency and inventiveness were celebrated. But the subtext was clear also. Mossad has been a loose cannon, capable of manipulating politicians and imposing a ferociously hawkish agenda often against the nation's interest.

...and also wrote:

The documentary team also interviewed Mossad's "most successful spy" who talked about his undercover operations in Syria, Lebanon and other Arab countries during an espionage career lasting 25 years. Named only as Yakooba, the spy...played a crucial role in averting a full-scale Syrian tank attack (and) underwent plastic surgery to change his face.

The Belfast News Letter said this was the first time ever that Rafael "Rafi" Eitan, legendary first director of operations, was captured on film and went on to claim

"the Israelis themselves are desperately unhappy about the Channel 4 film. It accuses Prime Minister Benjamin Netanyahu of personally authorising the murder of several of the country's Muslim enemies. Channel 4 used Israfilm, which is headed by Zvi Spielmann, a military intelligence veteran who used to head the Israeli censor's office, to open doors for its journalists. They were given unprecedented access to Eitan, former Mossad director general Meir Amit, Israel's longest-serving spymaster General Yoel Ben Porat, and former director of military intelligence, Uri Saguy."

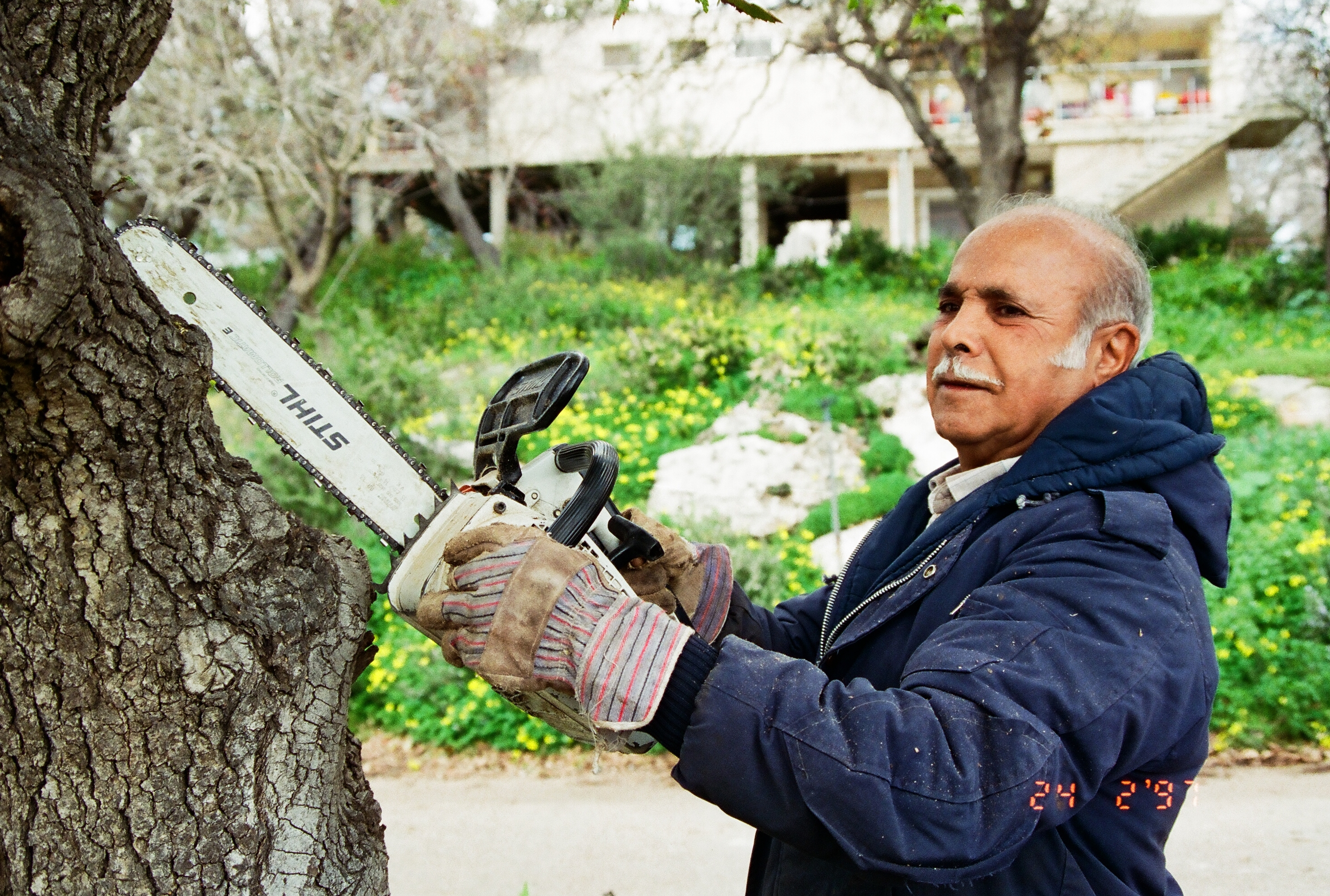
Agent "Yakooba" appearing in The Spy Machine

The newspaper quoted Channel 4 executive David Lloyd:

Over the last decade, mounting criticisms on many sides have led some people to believe that Mossad is out of kilter with the times. I saw the piece as really about Mossad as a construction of the Israeli state. We talk to key senior insiders, go through some of the major moments in the agency's history and visit the memorial to those who died in Mossad's service. We look at how they lifted Eichmann, and their undercover operations in a number of countries, especially their use of Israeli Arabs in the hostile nations which surround them.
