= Secrets of the Super Psychics =

1997 British TV documentary

Secrets of the Super Psychics is a Channel 4 documentary special in the UK, first shown in the Equinox strand in 1997, later reformatted as a shorter The Learning Channel episode in 1998. Staff reporter Henry Mietkiewicz comments on the show in The Toronto Star saying, "Viewers eager to know more about the differences between science and claptrap should tune in". An 11-minute version is available on YouTube.

The 90-minute film, made by Open Media, was first shown in the UK under the title Secrets of the Psychics.

Simon Hoggart wrote in The Spectator that this was

the first show ever to take on the notoriously litigious Uri Geller. They showed how all his parlour tricks could be easily duplicated by jobbing magicians without any help from paranormal powers.

In 1998 the Broadcasting Standards Commission in the United Kingdom rejected a complaint made by Uri Geller. Susan Blackmore summarized the conclusions as saying that it, "wasn't unfair to have magicians showing how they duplicate those 'psychic feats', and experts saying there is no reliable scientific evidence for his psychic powers whatsoever".
