= Hipódromo (Santurce) =

Subbarrio of Santurce in San Juan, Puerto Rico

Coordinates: 18°26′44″N 66°04′16″W

- Subbarrio
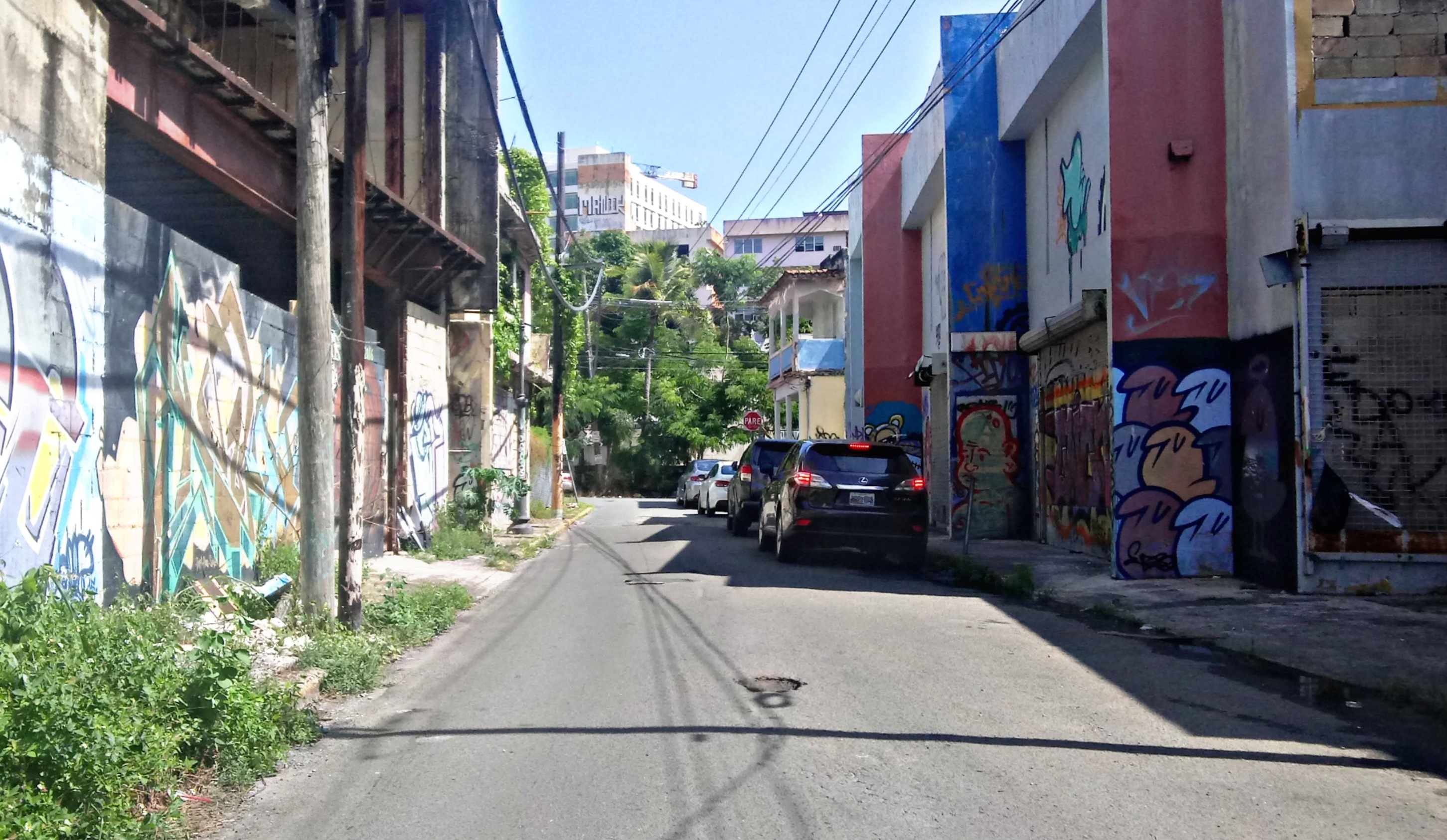
- Street and urban decay in Hipódromo, Santurce

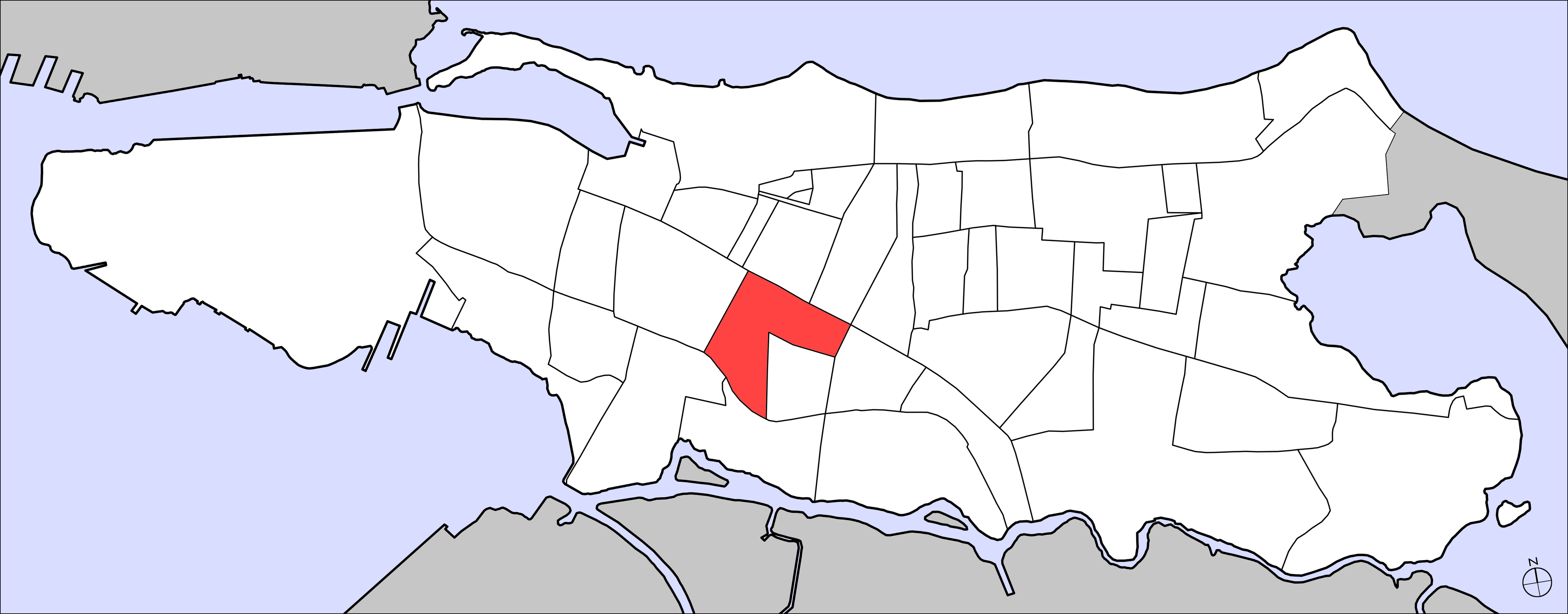
- Commonwealth: Puerto Rico
- Municipality: San Juan
- Barrio: Santurce

Area
  - Total: .10 sq mi (0.26 km^{2})
  - Land: .10 sq mi (0.26 km^{2})
- Elevation: 23 ft (7.0 m)

Population (2010)
  - Total: 1,523
  - Density: 15,230/sq mi (5,880/km^{2})
- Source: 2010 Census
- Time zone: UTC−4 (AST)

Hipódromo is one of the forty subbarrios of Santurce, San Juan, Puerto Rico.

== Demographics ==
In 1940, Hipódromo had a population of 3,700.

In 2000, Hipódromo had a population of 2,017.

In 2010, Hipódromo had a population of 1,523 and a population density of 15,230 persons per square mile.

== See also ==
- List of communities in Puerto Rico
