= Gordon Theatre, Stoke-on-Trent =

The Gordon Theatre was a theatre in Stoke-upon-Trent (a component town of Stoke-on-Trent), in Staffordshire, England. It was subsequently the Hippodrome Theatre, and the Gaumont Cinema.

== History ==
The original theatre on the site on Wolfe Street, present-day Kingsway (coordinates 53°0′16.4″N 2°10′59.1″W) was the Crown Theatre, built in 1897; it was a wooden building seating about 1100, designed by Charles Lynham Beckett.

It was replaced in 1900 by a theatre designed by George F. Ward, of Owen and Ward. It was named the Gordon Theatre; the existing hotel opposite the theatre was the Gordon Hotel, named after General Gordon of Khartoum. There was a bust of Gordon over the main entrance of the theatre. The richly decorated auditorium, seating about 2000, comprised stalls on the ground floor, with boxes, dress circle and balcony above, and gallery over. The theatre opened on 12 March 1900 with the musical The Belle of New York.

It was renamed the Hippodrome Theatre in 1908. From this time it was a variety theatre, and it also screened films. It was taken over by the Biocolour Picture Theatres in 1919, and was converted into a cinema; it opened as a cinema on 21 April 1919 with the film The Silver King. Biocolour was taken over by Gaumont-British in 1926.

It closed for refurbishment in December 1951, and a modern Streamline Moderne interior replaced the Victorian decoration, with the upper balcony removed. It re-opened as the Gaumont on 28 July 1952, with the film The Greatest Show on Earth.

The cinema was closed in January 1961 by its then owners The Rank Organisation. It was demolished in May 1962, and shops were subsequently built on the site.
