= Alan Clark =

British politician and author (1928–1999)

The Right Honourable Alan Clark
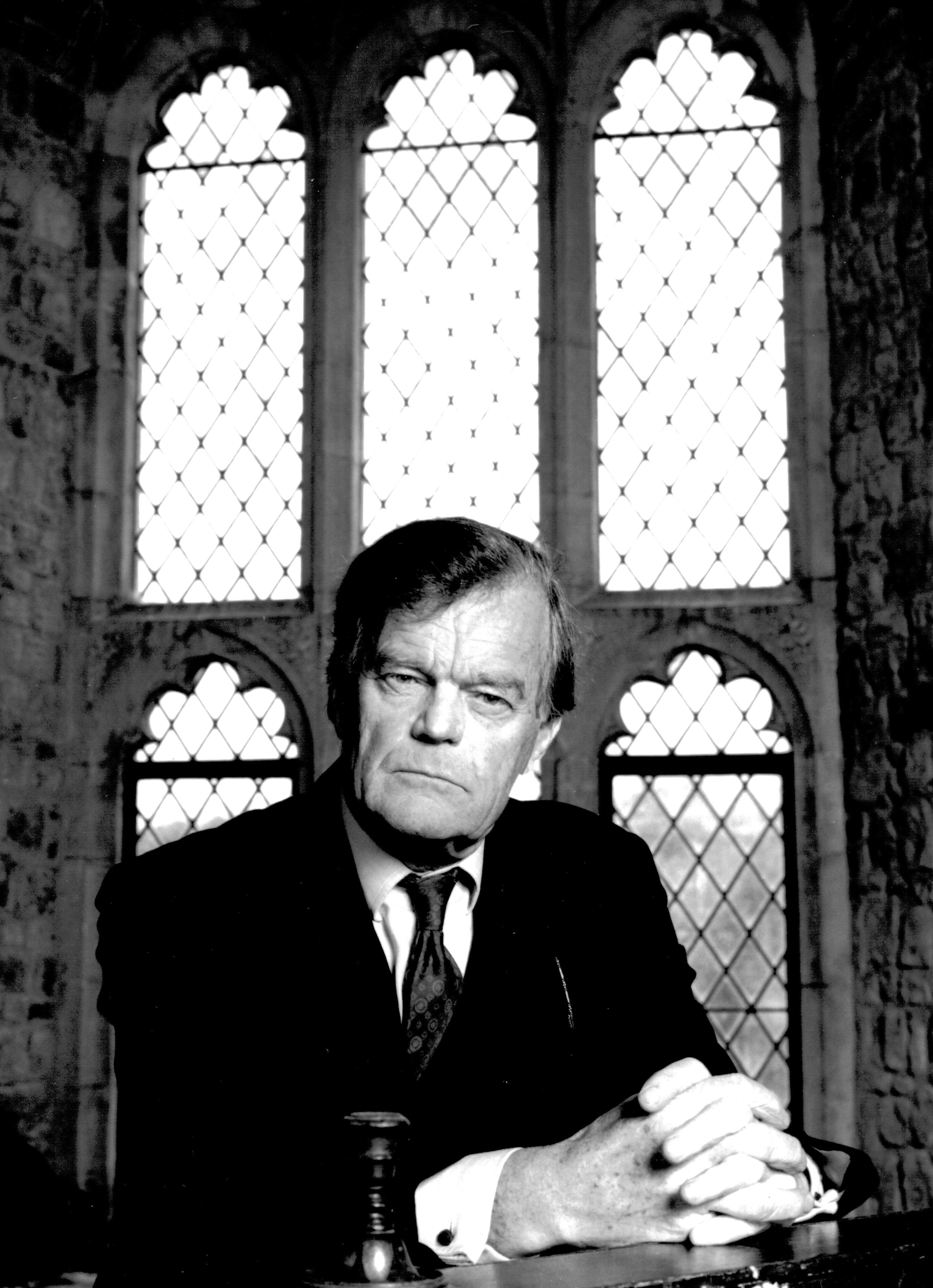
- Clark appearing on Opinions in 1993

Minister of State for Defence Procurement
- In office 25 July 1989 – 14 April 1992
- Prime Minister: Margaret Thatcher; John Major
- Preceded by: The Lord Trefgarne
- Succeeded by: Jonathan Aitken

Minister of State for Trade
- In office 24 January 1986 – 24 July 1989
- Prime Minister: Margaret Thatcher
- Preceded by: Paul Channon
- Succeeded by: The Lord Trefgarne

Parliamentary Under-Secretary of State for Employment
- In office 13 June 1983 – 24 January 1986
- Prime Minister: Margaret Thatcher
- Preceded by: Peter Morrison
- Succeeded by: Ian Lang

Member of Parliament for Kensington and Chelsea
- In office 1 May 1997 – 5 September 1999
- Preceded by: Constituency Created
- Succeeded by: Michael Portillo

Member of Parliament for Plymouth Sutton
- In office 28 February 1974 – 16 March 1992
- Preceded by: David Owen
- Succeeded by: Gary Streeter

Personal details
- Born: Alan Kenneth Mackenzie Clark; 13 April 1928 London, England
- Died: 5 September 1999 (aged 71) Saltwood, England
- Party: Conservative
- Spouse: (Caroline) Jane Beuttler (m. 1958)
- Children: 2
- Parents: Kenneth Clark; Elizabeth Martin
- Relatives: Colin Clark (brother)
- Education: Christ Church, Oxford

Alan Kenneth Mackenzie Clark (13 April 1928 – 5 September 1999) was a British Conservative Member of Parliament (MP), author and diarist. He served as a junior minister in Margaret Thatcher's governments at the Departments of Employment, Trade and Defence. He became a member of the Privy Council of the United Kingdom in 1991.

He was the author of several books of military history, including his controversial work The Donkeys (1961), which inspired the musical satire Oh, What a Lovely War!.

Clark became known for his flamboyance, wit, irreverence and keen support of animal rights. Norman Lamont called him "the most politically incorrect, outspoken, iconoclastic and reckless politician of our times". His three-volume Alan Clark Diaries contains a candid account of political life under Thatcher and a description of the weeks preceding his death, which he continued to write until he could no longer focus on the page.

== Early life ==
Alan Clark was born at 55 Lancaster Gate, London, the elder son of art historian Kenneth Clark (later Lord Clark), who was of Scottish parentage, and his wife Elizabeth Winifred Clark (née Martin), who was Irish. His sister and brother, fraternal twins Colette (known as Celly) and Colin, were born in 1932. At the age of six he began as a day boy at Egerton House, a preparatory school in Marylebone, and from there at the age of nine went on as a boarder to St Cyprian's School, Eastbourne. Clark was one of the seventy boys rescued when the school building was destroyed by fire in May 1939. He was relocated with the school to Midhurst.

In September 1940, with the Luftwaffe threatening south-east England, the Clarks moved their son to a safer location at Cheltenham College Junior School. From there he went to Eton in January 1942. In February 1946 while at Eton he joined the training regiment of the Household Cavalry based at Combermere Barracks, Windsor. He transferred to the regiment's Territorial unit the same day, but was discharged in August when he had left Eton. Later that year, he was called up for national service in the Royal Air Force Education Branch, but was exempted after citing his experience in the Household Cavalry while at Eton, which his biographer Ion Trewin described as "a bit like doing Officer Training Corps", but which Clark would later again embellish as prior military service in a CV for a possible parliamentary candidacy.

He then went to Christ Church, Oxford, where he read Modern History under Hugh Trevor-Roper, obtaining a third-class honours degree. As an undergraduate he was a member of the Bullingdon Club, a private all-male dining club known for its wealthy members, grand banquets, and bad behaviour, including vandalism of restaurants and students' rooms. The club selects its members not only on the grounds of wealth and willingness to participate but also by means of education. After Oxford he wrote articles for the motoring press before he went on to read for the bar. He was called to the bar in 1955 but did not practise law. Instead, he began privately studying military history with a view to professional writing on the topic.

== Military history ==
Clark's first book, The Donkeys (1961), was a revisionist history of the British Expeditionary Force's (BEF) campaigns at the beginning of the First World War. The book covers Western Front operations during 1915, including the offensives at Neuve Chapelle, Aubers Ridge and Loos, and ending with the enforced resignation of Sir John French as commander-in-chief of the BEF, and his replacement by Douglas Haig. Clark describes the battle scenes, and criticises the actions of several of the generals involved in the heavy loss of life that occurred. Much of the book is based on the political manoeuvres behind the scenes as commanders jostled for influence, and John French's difficulties dealing with his French allies and with Lord Kitchener. Haig's own diaries are used to demonstrate how Haig positioned himself to take over command. The publication sold well, and is still in print 50 years after its first print run, being regarded as an important work on the British experience of the World War.

The book's title was drawn from the expression "Lions led by donkeys" which has been widely used to compare British soldiers with their commanders. In 1921 Princess Evelyn Blücher published her memoirs, which attributed the phrase to OHL (the German GHQ) in 1918. Clark was unable to find the origin of the expression. He prefaced the book with a supposed dialogue between two generals and attributed the dialogue to the memoirs of German general Erich von Falkenhayn. Clark was equivocal about the source for the dialogue for many years, but in 2007, his friend Euan Graham recalled a conversation in the mid-1960s when Clark, on being challenged as to the dialogue's provenance, looked sheepish and said, "Well I invented it." This supposed invention emboldened critics of The Donkeys to condemn the work.

Clark's choice of subject was strongly influenced by Lord Lee of Fareham, a family friend who had never forgotten what he saw as the shambles of the BEF. In developing his work, Clark became close friends with historian Basil Liddell Hart, who acted as his mentor. Liddell Hart read the drafts and was concerned by Clark's "intermittent carelessness". He produced several lists of corrections, which were incorporated, and wrote "It is a fine piece of writing, and often brilliantly penetrating."

Even before publication, Clark's work came under attack from supporters of Haig, including the field marshal's son and historians John Terraine, Robert Blake and Hugh Trevor-Roper, former tutor to Clark, who was married to Haig's daughter. On publication, The Donkeys received very supportive comments from Lord Beaverbrook, who recommended the work to Winston Churchill, and The Times printed a positive review. However, John Terraine and A. J. P. Taylor wrote damning reviews and historian Michael Howard wrote "As history, it is worthless", criticising its "slovenly scholarship". Howard nonetheless commended its readability and noted that descriptions of battles and battlefields are "sometimes masterly". Field Marshal Montgomery later told Clark it was "A Dreadful Tale: You have done a good job in exposing the total failure of the generalship".

In more recent years, the work has been criticised by some historians for being one-sided in its treatment of World War One generals. Brian Bond, in editing a 1991 collection of essays on First World War history, expressed the collective desire of the authors to move beyond "popular stereotypes of The Donkeys" while also acknowledging that serious leadership mistakes were made and that the authors would do little to rehabilitate the reputations of, for instance, the senior commanders on The Somme.

The historian Peter Simkins complained that it was frustratingly difficult to counter Clark's prevailing view. Professor Richard Holmes made a similar complaint, writing that "Alan Clark's The Donkeys, for all its verve and amusing narrative, added a streak of pure deception to the writings of the First World War. Its title is based on 'Lions led by Donkeys'. Sadly for historical accuracy, there is no evidence whatever for this; none. Not a jot or scintilla. The real problem is that such histories have sold well and continue to do so. They reinforce historical myth by delivering to the reader exactly what they expect to read". Clark's work was described as "contemptible" by Henry Paget, 7th Marquess of Anglesey who regarded Clark as the most arrogant and least respectable writer on the War, but the impartiality of this view may have been overshadowed by the fact that Anglesey's own history of the British Cavalry had been reviewed by Clark with the comments "cavalry are nearly always a disaster, a waste of space and resources." Graham Stewart, Clark's researcher for a later political history that he would write entitled The Tories, noted: "Alan wasn't beyond quoting people selectively to make them look bad".

Clark went on to publish several more works of military history through the 1960s, including Barbarossa in 1965 examining the Operation Barbarossa offensive of the Second World War; he also tried his hand at novel writing, but none of the subsequent books were as commercially successful or drew the same attention as The Donkeys had achieved, and he abandoned the path of military history in the mid-1970s to pursue a professional career in national politics.

== Political career ==
Clark's first foray into politics was on the issue of the Common Market, which he opposed. With those beliefs, he joined the Conservative Monday Club in 1968, and was soon chairman of its Wiltshire branch. In 1971 he was blacklisted by Conservative Party Central Office for being too right-wing, but after representations by him, and others, he was removed from the blacklist.

He unsuccessfully sought the Conservative selection for Weston super-Mare in 1970, missing out to Jerry Wiggin. He subsequently became MP for Plymouth Sutton at the February 1974 general election with a majority of 8,104, when Harold Wilson took over from Edward Heath as prime minister of a minority Labour government. At the General Election in October 1974, when Labour gained a small overall majority, Clark's vote fell by 1,192 votes, but he still had a comfortable majority with 5,188. His first five years in parliament were spent on the Conservative opposition benches. He was still a member of the Monday Club in May 1975. It is unclear when he let his membership of the club lapse, but possibly it was upon becoming a government minister. He continued to address Club events until 1992.

During the subsequent Party leadership contest he was urged by Airey Neave to vote for Margaret Thatcher, but he is thought to have favoured Willie Whitelaw. The following year came the free vote on the Common Market and Clark, praising Enoch Powell's speech, voted against. The next day he told the socialist MP Dennis Skinner that "I'd rather live in a socialist Britain than one ruled by a lot of fucking foreigners." Although he was personally liked by Margaret Thatcher, for whom he had great admiration, and the columnist George Hutchinson (who, writing in The Times, tipped him for inclusion in the Shadow Cabinet), Clark was never promoted to the cabinet, remaining in mid-ranking ministerial positions during the 1980s.

=== First portfolios ===
Clark received his first ministerial posting as a Parliamentary Under-Secretary of State at the Department of Employment in 1983, where he was responsible for moving the approval of regulations relating to equal pay in the House of Commons. His speech in 1983 followed a wine-tasting dinner with his friend of many years standing, Christopher Soames. Irritated by what he regarded as a bureaucratically written civil-service speech, he galloped through the script, skipping over pages of text. The then-opposition MP Clare Short stood up on a point of order and, after acknowledging that MPs cannot formally accuse each other of being drunk in the House of Commons, accused him of being "incapable", a euphemism for drunk. Although the government benches were furious at the accusation, Clark later admitted in his diaries that the wine-tasting had affected him. To date, he is the only Member of Parliament to have been accused in the House of Commons of being drunk at the despatch box.

In 1986, Clark was promoted to Minister for Trade at the Department of Trade and Industry. It was during this time that he became involved with the issue of export licences to Iraq, the Matrix-Churchill affair. In 1989, he became Minister for Defence Procurement at the Ministry of Defence.

When Clark was Minister for Trade, responsible for overseeing arms sales to foreign governments, he was interviewed by journalist John Pilger who asked him:

JP "Did it bother you personally that this British equipment was causing such mayhem and human suffering (by supplying arms for Indonesia's war in East Timor)?"
AC "No, not in the slightest, it never entered my head. You tell me that this was happening, I didn't hear about it or know about it."
JP "Well, even if I hadn't told you it was happening, the fact that we supply highly effective equipment to a regime like that is not a consideration, as far as you're concerned. It's not a personal consideration. I ask the question because I read you are a vegetarian and you are quite seriously concerned about the way animals are killed."
AC "Yeah."
JP "Doesn't that concern extend to the way humans, albeit foreigners, are killed?"
AC "Curiously not. No."

In November 1990, when Margaret Thatcher was challenged for the leadership of the Conservative Party, Clark told Thatcher to 'fight on at all costs' even though he thought she would lose, because it was better to go out in a 'blaze of glorious defeat than to go gentle into that good night'. Thatcher later withdrew from the leadership contest.

=== Departure and return ===
Clark left Parliament in 1992 following Margaret Thatcher's fall from power. His admission during the Matrix Churchill trial that he had been "economical with the actualité" in answer to parliamentary questions about what he knew with regard to arms export licences to Iraq, caused the collapse of the trial and the establishment of the Scott Inquiry, which helped undermine John Major's government.

Clark became bored with life outside politics and returned to Parliament as member for Kensington and Chelsea in the election of 1997, becoming critical of NATO's campaign in the Balkans.

Clark held strong views on British unionism, racial difference, social class, and was in support of animal rights, nationalist protectionism and Euroscepticism. He referred to Enoch Powell as "The Prophet". Clark once declared: "It is natural to be proud of your race and your country", and in a departmental meeting, allegedly referred to Africa as "Bongo Bongo Land". When called to account, however, Clark denied the comment had any racist overtones, claiming it had simply been a reference to the president of Gabon, Omar Bongo.

Clark argued that the media and the government failed to pick out the racism towards white people and ignored any racist attacks on white people. He also, however, described the National Front chairman, John Tyndall, as "a bit of a blockhead" and disavowed his ideas.

On his death in 1999, figures from all sides of politics paid tribute to Clark, though his critics remained. Prime Minister Tony Blair spoke of Clark as "extraordinary, amusing, irreverent, but with real conviction and belief, and behind the headlines, kind and thoughtful." And the Liberal Democrat, Simon Hughes, described him as "courageous, idiosyncratic, talented and principled. However, journalist Dominic Lawson criticised Clark as "sleazy, vindictive, greedy, callous and cruel", while Ion Trewin (subsequently his biographer) referred to Clark as "wonderful".

Clark was a passionate supporter of animal rights, joining activists in demonstrations at Dover against live export, and outside the House of Commons in support of Animal Liberation Front hunger-striker Barry Horne.

Charles Moore once asked Clark whether he was in love with Margaret Thatcher, to which he replied 'I don't want actual penetration, just a massive snog'.

== Diaries ==
Clark kept a regular diary from 1955 until August 1999 (during his second spell as a Member of Parliament) when he was incapacitated due to the onset of the brain tumour which was to be the cause of his death a month later. The last month of his life would be chronicled by his wife, Jane. The diaries covering the period 1983 to 1992 were published after he left the House of Commons, deciding not to seek re-election to his Plymouth Sutton seat. Published in 1993 and known simply as Diaries (although later subtitled In Power), they have been recognised as a definitive account of the downfall of Prime Minister Margaret Thatcher. They caused a minor embarrassment at the time with their descriptions of senior Conservative politicians such as Michael Heseltine, Douglas Hurd, and Kenneth Clarke. He quoted Michael Jopling – referring to Heseltine, deputy PM at the time – as saying "The trouble with Michael is that he had to buy all his furniture" and judged it "Snobby, but cutting". Two subsequent volumes of his diaries cover the earlier and later parts of Clark's parliamentary career. The diaries reveal recurring worries about Japanese militarism but his real views are often not clear because he enjoyed making "tongue in cheek" remarks to the discomfiture of those he believed to be fools, as in his sympathy for a British version of National Socialism.

Cover page for Alan Clark Diaries

Before his death in 1999, Clark had started work on the prequel to the 1983–1992 Diaries to cover his entry in politics, from seeking a Conservative Association to adopt him as their Parliamentary Candidate in 1972 until the 1983 general election. Published a year after his death, this volume was titled Diaries: Into Politics and covered 1972 to 1983.

The final volume, covering Clark's decision not to seek re-election at the 1992 general election, his regret at leaving the House of Commons and then his return to Parliament, was published in 2002 and included Clark's final days dying from a brain tumour.

Throughout his diaries Clark refers admiringly to Henry "Chips" Channon and his diaries. He also quotes Adolf Hitler, to whom he refers as "Wolf".

The diaries include much reference to Clark's love of his chalet at Zermatt, his Scottish estate at Eriboll and the architecture of and country around Saltwood Castle, his home in Kent. Clark's fascination with classic cars is also evident, as is his enthusiasm for backgammon.

The Diaries were serialised into six episodes of The Alan Clark Diaries by the BBC and shown in 2004 with John Hurt and Jenny Agutter.

== Personal life ==
In 1958, Clark, aged 30, married 16-year-old (Caroline) Jane, daughter of Colonel Leslie Brindley Bream Beuttler OBE of the Duke of Wellington's Regiment and a descendant on her mother's side of the Scottish ornithologist William Robert Ogilvie-Grant, grandson of the 6th Earl of Seafield. They were married for 41 years and had two sons:

- James Alasdair Kenneth Clark (born 1960, died 15 August 2019)
- Andrew McKenzie Clark (born 1962)

His elder son James (who lived in Eriboll, a Scottish estate) died of a brain tumour on 15 August 2019, aged 59.

While involved in the Matrix Churchill trial he was cited in a divorce case in South Africa, in which it was revealed he had had affairs with Valerie Harkess, the wife of a South African barrister, and her daughters, Josephine and Alison. After sensationalist tabloid headlines, Clark's wife Jane remarked upon what Clark had called "the coven" with the line: "Quite frankly, if you bed people that I call 'below-stairs class', they go to the papers, don't they?".

== Death ==
Clark died at Saltwood Castle on 5 September 1999, aged 71, after suffering from a brain tumour. His body was buried in the grounds of the castle. Upon his death, his family said Clark wanted it to be stated that he had "gone to join Tom and the other dogs."

His death resulted in a by-election in his constituency, which was won by fellow Conservative Michael Portillo, the former Secretary of State for Defence.

== Media ==
In 1993 Clark gave a half-hour Opinions lecture, televised by Channel 4, of which he said in his diary: "It was good. Clear, assured, moving. I looked compos and in my 'prime'. Many people saw it. All were enthusiastic. Today acres of coverage in The Times." In 1997 Clark presented a four-part series for the BBC entitled Alan Clark's History of the Tory Party.

In 2004, John Hurt portrayed Clark (and Jenny Agutter his wife Jane) in the BBC's The Alan Clark Diaries, reigniting some of the controversies surrounding their original publication and once again brought his name into the British press and media. An authorised biography of Alan Clark by Ion Trewin, the editor of his diaries, was published in September 2009.

== See also ==
- List of animal rights advocates

== Publications ==
- Bargains at Special Prices (1960).
- Summer Season (1961).
- The Donkeys: A History of the British Expeditionary Force in 1915 (1961).
- The Fall of Crete (1963).
- Barbarossa: The Russian-German Conflict, 1941–1945 (1965).
- The Lion Heart: A Tale of the War in Vietnam (1969).
- Suicide of the Empires (1971).
- Aces High: The War in the Air over the Western Front 1914–1918 (1973).
- Diaries (three volumes, 1972–1999):
  - Volume 1 Diaries: In Power 1983–1992 (1993).
  - Volume 2 Diaries: Into Politics 1972–1982 (2000).
  - Volume 3 Diaries: The Last Diaries 1993–1999 (2002).
- The Tories: Conservatives and the Nation State 1922–1997 (1998).
- Backfire: A Passion for Cars and Motoring (2001).

== Notes ==
Parliament of the United Kingdom
| Preceded by David Owen | Member of Parliament for Plymouth Sutton; 1974–1992 | Succeeded by Gary Streeter |
| New constituency | Member of Parliament for Kensington and Chelsea; 1997–1999 | Succeeded by Michael Portillo |
