= Equinox (TV programme) =

British science documentary programme

- Equinox title card
- Country of origin: United Kingdom
- Original language: English

Production
- Camera setup: 4:3, 16:9
- Running time: 60 minutes

Original release
- Network: Channel 4
- Release: 31 July 1986 – 21 December 2006

Equinox is a British science and documentary programme. The series ran from 31 July 1986 to 21 December 2006, originally airing on a weekly basis on Channel 4.

The number of films per series fell over the years, from eighteen one-hour films a year originally to twelve by the late 1990s. The last regular series was shown on 21 December 2006, with twelve films. One-off films have occasionally been aired under the title "Equinox Special" (e.g. the 90-minute Secrets of the Super Psychics first transmitted in 1997).

== Notable episodes ==
- "F1 TURBO - Once Around the Block" (1986) – follows the development of the Ford Cosworth GBA TEC V6 Twin Turbo Formula 1 engine
- "Dismantling the Bomb" (1994) – just how do you dismantle the world's nuclear weapons stockpile?
- "It Runs on Water" (1995) – the alternative energy and over-unity energy revolution – foreword by Arthur C Clarke
- "A Very British Bomb" (1997) – the development of the UK's home grown H-bomb
- "The Engines That Came In from the Cold" (2001) – decades-old Soviet rocket engines that are way ahead of anything being made in the West and NASA wants them.
