= Simon Drake =

English magician

- Born: Simon Alexander; 1 March 1957 (age 69); Surrey, England
- Occupations: Magician, illusionist, director, producer, writer
- Years active: 1974–present
- Website: houseofmagic.co.uk

Simon Drake (born Simon Alexander; 1 March 1957) is an English magician based in London. He is best known for the television series The Secret Cabaret made for Britain's Channel 4.

== Early life ==
Born in London, Drake is the son of a GP. Drake worked as a record plugger at Decca Records when he met Arthur Brown. Brown would become a mentor to Drake as he trained as a magician.

== Performing career ==
He first came to wider attention in Kate Bush's UK live tour in 1979 for which he co-devised visuals and played seven characters. He has a wide and diverse performing history, performing at Tenjō Sajiki in Japan, to the Royal Variety Show at the London Palladium before Queen Elizabeth II. He advised Nicolas Roeg for the film Castaway, coaching Oliver Reed in sleight of hand, and was magic advisor to Harvey Keitel on FairyTale: A True Story.

He has performed and consulted with many performers including Elton John, Phil Collins, Madness, David Gilmour, Meat Loaf, Steve Miller, Daryl Hall, Bill Wyman, George Harrison, Julian Lennon, Kate Bush, Peter Gabriel, Katy Perry, and Pamela Stephenson.

In August 1993 he was seen on American TV in the special Raising Hell, in which he co-starred with Iron Maiden.

Drake has performed twice as a guest with The Royal Ballet at The Royal Opera House, Covent Garden and the London Coliseum. He has appeared at festivals and tours in Canada, New Zealand, Europe and in the UK and has had residencies at many London nightclubs as well as a month in cabaret at Casino de Monte-Carlo, Paris and Dubai. He was the magic and effects supervisor to Cameron Mackintosh for the West End production of The Witches of Eastwick and Ducktastic.

He was a consultant on the South London Theatre's Spring 2007 production of Dr Faustus. He was also a consultant on the production of episode 6 of the fourth series of the BBC television drama Hustle. He was also a magic advisor on the Terry Gilliam film The Imaginarium of Dr. Parnassus acting as a consultant to the director in pre-production and coaching Christopher Plummer and Andrew Garfield in the art of sleight of hand. He was called in to help Terry Gilliam with a seemingly impossible problem on his production of into the Woods which opened at the Theatre Royal Bath in Summer 2022.

== House of Magic ==
In 1996 he opened his own 4,000-square-foot (370 m^{2}) venue, Simon Drake's House of Magic, in a converted Victorian building at an unpublicised location in Southwark in central London.

This performing space specialises in corporate entertainment functions, with monthly public performance nights.
