= Queen's Park Hippodrome =

Coordinates: 53.504185°N 2.216168°W

- Interactive map of Queen's Park Hippodrome
- Address: Turkey Lane, Harpurhey; Manchester; United Kingdom

Construction
- Opened: 1904
- Closed: 1952
- Demolished: 1966

The Queen's Park Hippodrome was a theatre in Harpurhey, Manchester, England. It was built on the site of an old tramshed and opened on 25 April 1904. It initially staged variety, dramas, pantomimes, and revues, which gave way to "sizzlingly saucy" French variety acts towards the end of the theatre's life.

Like many other theatres of the period, the increasing competition from cinema resulted in its closure in 1952, and the building was eventually demolished in 1966.

The theatre was part of the Broadhead Circuit of 17 theatres at its peak, which had its headquarters at Hulme Hippodrome.
