= Desmond Harney =

British intelligence officer

- Education: Durham University
- Espionage activity
- Allegiance: United Kingdom
- Service branch: MI6
- Service years: 1954–1979
- Operations: Kenya • Iran

Desmond Edward St Aubyn Harney OBE (14 February 1929 – 10 December 2000) was a British intelligence officer and Conservative Party politician.

A fluent Farsi speaker, Harney was a foreign observer in Iran in the years leading up to the revolution, where he enjoyed intimate access to the inner circle of the Shah, but failed to anticipate his eventual overthrow.

In later life, he entered the world of local politics and served as Mayor of Kensington and Chelsea, though he was thwarted in his ambition to become an MP.

== Biography ==
=== Early life and education ===
Harney was the son of Irish lawyer and politician Edward Harney, who died shortly after his birth. Raised in the North East, he was educated at Corby School in Sunderland and Durham University, where he graduated with a first-class degree in Geography and Geology. At Durham he was active in the Exploration Society, in which capacity he took part in expeditions to Iceland and Morocco, and was also President of the Durham Union. After leaving Durham, Harney embarked on postgraduate studies in Geography at St Catharine's College, Cambridge, but ultimately left early without taking a degree.

=== Career ===
Harney worked at Imperial Chemical Industries from 1954, leaving two years later for the Foreign Office. He undertook Persian language training with Ann Lambton at SOAS. He was sent to Iran in 1958 and then Kenya in 1964, where he built relationships with people close to President Kenyatta and was rewarded with an OBE for his efforts. He returned to Iran in 1971, leaving in 1979 in the aftermath of the Islamic Revolution. From 1974 onwards he worked an undercover position as an advisor to banking firm Morgan Grenfell.

The rise to power of Ruhollah Khomeini took Harney by surprise, who felt the left-wing National Front was more likely to consolidate control. He regarded the Shah as personally flawed, but nevertheless saw him as an effective administrator, apparently underestimating the degree to which his modernisation policies had alienated more traditional elements of Persian society. Another reason Harney failed to anticipate the "onset of revolution" was his lack of close contacts within the Iranian opposition or the circles of the leading mullahs. He was discouraged from attempting such relationships, as the British government did not wish to offend the Shah and relied on SAVAK, the state security service, for the bulk of its reporting on Iranian politics.

In 1980, Harney's espionage background was revealed in the American press. Iranian authorities had leaked a series of reports from SAVAK. Among them was a file belonging to Arthur Callaghan, the former CIA station chief, which mentioned Harney as a trusted contact and described him as a British intelligence officer with a nominal job as a Morgan Grenfell banker.

=== Political career ===
Harney held ambitions to secure a seat in the House of Commons, but his advancing age counted against him and he failed to be selected as a Conservative Party candidate. Instead, he concentrated on local politics and was elected as a Conservative councillor in the Royal Borough of Kensington and Chelsea during the 1986 council elections. He also served as Mayor of Kensington and Chelsea from 1993 to 1994.

Harney did not seek re-election in 1998 and retired to Broadwater House in Sherborne, Gloucestershire.

== Personal ==
Harney married Judith Downing in 1954 and had three children.

Harney was first publicly identified in Britain as a former MI6 officer in May 2000, via the publication of the book MI6: Fifty Years of Special Operations by Stephen Dorril, who had chosen to ignore the D-notice system. The revelation broke the "general unstated agreement" in the British media that it was inappropriate to identify intelligence officers.

One of Harney's hobbies was photography. He was known to supplement his salary by selling photographs of "little visited places" to commercial agencies. He was also a member of the Garrick Club.

== Publications ==
- The Priest and the King: An Eyewitness Account of the Iranian Revolution, I. B. Tauris, 1998
