= Jock Kane =

GCHQ whistleblower, banned books author

John Kane (7 April 1921 – 27 September 2013) was a Scottish whistleblower who was prevented from publishing two books alleging corruption at the British intelligence agency Government Communications Headquarters (GCHQ). Kane served with the Royal Air Force in various European theatres as a radio operator in World War II, before joining GCHQ after the war. While serving with GCHQ in Hong Kong, Kane was concerned with the lack of security and after uncovering fraud, raised his complaints with officials. Kane retired in 1978 and his complaints were investigated by a senior civil servant, but the report was never published. Kane wrote a memoir in 1984, GCHQ: The Negative Asset, which was subsequently banned, as was a second memoir, The Hidden Depths of Treachery (1987). Kane later worked as a school bus driver after retiring from GCHQ.

== Personal life ==
Kane was born in Coatbridge, North Lanarkshire, in 1921, his mother died in childbirth when he was two. Raised by his father with the help of aunts, he was educated at St Patrick's High School in Coatbridge. Kane was married twice, first to Alexandra in 1949, with whom he had two sons. Kane had met Alexandra in Greece, where she had been a member of the Greek Resistance. Alexandra had been imprisoned during the Second World War for helping to evacuate Allied soldiers stranded there after the Battle of Greece. Kane married Cynthia, his second wife, in 1983. After his marriage to Cynthia, Kane moved to Barton on Sea in Hampshire, where he worked as a milkman and school bus driver.

== Military and GCHQ career ==
In 1939, Kane joined the Royal Air Force, training as a radio operator in Blackpool. With the RAF Kane flew on sorties during the Battle of the Atlantic, tasked with calibrating radar signals, to help combat the threat of German submarines to Allied shipping. Kane also served with RAF squadrons supporting allied forces in North Africa and Italy, and was sent into occupied Yugoslavia in 1944, and Greece.

After leaving the RAF at the end of the war, Kane was recruited by intelligence agency GCHQ in November 1946. He was posted to a listening station at Hawklaw, near Cupar in Fife, Scotland. Raw intelligence material would be supplied by Hawklaw to Bletchley Park (known as X-Station) to be de-coded. During the Cold War, the target of Kane's interception efforts at Hawklaw were the Soviet Union and its allies behind the Iron Curtain. Much of the material collected at Hawklaw would be subsequently transferred to the United States National Security Agency for further analysis. The Cupar station was one of a number of British Y-stations, monitoring the radio communications of Soviet naval vessels.

Kane served with GCHQ in Istanbul, Aden, Singapore, Hong Kong and Belfast. He retired from GCHQ in November 1978.

=== GCHQ whistleblower ===
By the early 1970s Kane had been working for GCHQ for more than 25 years, having worked in almost every section of the organisation. In 1973, Kane uncovered fraud in GCHQ, concerned with subsistence allowances. Staff sent on training courses had been collecting their full allowance over a weekend, when they were already home. Fraud that Kane found in the GCHQ outpost of Little Sai Wan in Hong Kong concerned employees renting apartments at lower rates than their £600 rent allowance, then submitting false invoices for the higher amount, and sharing the difference with their Chinese landlords. Kane had worked in Hong Kong until 1976. Senior GCHQ officers were also involved in the fraud, and Kane found that senior management at GCHQ were not interested in his complaints. Kane believed that these activities could expose staff to blackmail by hostile intelligence agencies. A spy ring had already been uncovered in Little Sai Wan, with 150 people arrested for spying in Hong Kong from 1970–1976. His allegations also concerned the loss of secret documents and the collection of material from wastepaper baskets by Chinese cleaners, which he had established by intercepting communications between Chinese intelligence agents.

Lax security at GCHQ was another target of Kane's allegations. Kane said that there were no proper controls of photocopiers, with no record of the number of copies taken. In addition, too many people had access to highly classified material, and staff were often found in high-security areas without the necessary clearance.

Though Kane was criticised by his GCHQ colleagues for taking security too seriously, he had subsequent meetings with Special Branch, the Director of Public Prosecutions, the Security Commission and Member of Parliament Kenneth Warren. Warren subsequently advanced Kane's complaints with Prime Minister James Callaghan. To investigate Kane's complaints Callaghan appointed a senior civil servant from the Home Office, James Waddell. Waddell's report was finished in April 1979, and never published. The new Prime Minister, Margaret Thatcher, described Kane's allegations as "unfounded" to Parliament; as a consequence Waddell hinted to a journalist that his report had not concluded that Kane's allegations were without foundation.

A June 1980 episode of the investigative television show, World In Action, titled Mr Kane's Campaign, was dedicated to Kane's revelations and campaign for stricter security at GCHQ in Hong Kong. The programme was modified after having been restricted from being broadcast by the Independent Broadcasting Authority.

Kane's 1984 memoir, GCHQ: The Negative Asset, was confiscated by Special Branch, and remains unpublished. The publishers of his first memoir, Robert Hale, were served with an injunction to prevent its publication. Details of the manuscript of The Negative Asset were published in The Washington Post in 1985; Kane denied leaking the manuscript to the newspaper. Copies of the Negative Asset were seized from its London publisher and from newspapers that had been considering serialization of its contents; police officers from Special Branch also travelled to New York to seize manuscripts.

The publication of Kane's 1987 memoir, The Hidden Depths of Treachery was also subsequently halted by an injunction served on the publishers Transworld Publications, Ltd. The two books had been written by Kane following his failure to end what he believed was the widespread existence of fraudulent activities in GCHQ. Kane was never prosecuted for his actions, which took place alongside the Geoffrey Prime affair and the ABC trial. Kane had also provided information to the defendants in the ABC trial. The Daily Telegraph said that these events gave the "ring of truth" to Kane's criticisms.

In July 1988, Kane made an extended appearance on the British Intelligence episode of the Channel 4 discussion programme After Dark, alongside Merlyn Rees, Robin Ramsay, H. Montgomery Hyde and others. He discussed with the former home secretary why he had been singled out by the authorities and said, as reported by The Scotsman, "in reasoned and deliberate voice": "Special Branch arrived at my house in Hampshire on a Sunday morning and I endured three days of intense questioning. I was never arrested or charged."

== See also ==
- List of whistleblowers
- Katharine Gun
