= Parapolitics (disambiguation) =

Parapolitics is a term for a 2006 scandal involving Colombian politicians and the paramilitary group the United Self-Defense Forces of Colombia.

Parapolitics may also refer to:

- Raghavan N. Iyer, for whom parapolitics is a method of rethinking the foundations and frontiers of political principles, systems, and issues
- Peter Dale Scott, who uses the term parapolitics as one aspect of his theory of "deep politics"
- Lobster (magazine), a UK magazine focused on how politics has been influenced by intelligence and security services
