= Baron Sinclair of Cleeve =

Title in the Peerage of the United Kingdom

Baron Sinclair of Cleeve, of Cleeve in the County of Somerset, is a title in the Peerage of the United Kingdom. It was created on 21 January 1957 for the businessman and public servant, Robert Sinclair. He notably served as President of the Imperial Tobacco Company and as Director-General of Army Requirements at the War Office from 1939 to 1942 and as Chief Executive at the Ministry of Production from 1943 to 1945. As of 2010 the title is held by his grandson, the third Baron, who succeeded his father in 1985.

== Barons Sinclair of Cleeve (1957) ==
- Robert John Sinclair, 1st Baron Sinclair of Cleeve (1893–1979)
- John Robert Kilgour Sinclair, 2nd Baron Sinclair of Cleeve (1919–1985)
- John Lawrence Robert Sinclair, 3rd Baron Sinclair of Cleeve (b. 1953).

There is no heir to the title.

== Arms ==
Coat of arms of Baron Sinclair of Cleeve
Crest In front of a saltire Argent a dove Proper beaked and legged Gules in the beak an olive branch also Proper. Escutcheon Or a cross engrailed Sable in the first quarter a sword erect Proper on a chief also Sable three martlets Gold Supporters Dexter, a griffin Sable; sinister, a unicorn Argent; each gorged with a Or white may leaved and flowered Proper. Motto Credo (I Believe)
