= Robin Ramsay =

Robin Ramsay may refer to:

- Robin Ramsay (actor) (born 1939), Australian television, film and stage actor
- Robin Ramsay (editor) (born 1948), British political author and magazine editor
