= John Goulden =

British diplomat

Sir Peter John Goulden GCMG (born 21 February 1941) is a British retired diplomat who was Ambassador to Turkey from 1992 until 1995, then Permanent Representative to the North Atlantic Council and to the Western European Union 1995–2001. Subsequently, he was a member of the Security Commission.

== Early years ==
Goulden was educated at King Edward VII School in Sheffield and at The Queen's College, Oxford, where he read history, taking the University History Prize in 1961 and graduating with first class honours in 1962.

== Career ==
Joining the Diplomatic Service, Goulden studied Turkish at London University and served in Ankara from 1963 to 1967. He spent three years as a Second Secretary on the Hungary/Romania/Czechoslovakia desk in the Foreign Office from 1967 to 1969, before spending 18 months in Manila. From 1971 to 1974 he was in the Planning Staff in the Foreign Office. From 1974 to 1976 he ran the Foreign Office's recruitment programme, taking off a month in 1974 to join the Geneva negotiations on Cyprus.

He was Head of Chancery in Dublin from 1976 to 1979, returning to be Assistant Head of Defence Department responsible for NATO affairs from 1979 to 1981. From there he was promoted to become Head of Personnel Services Department and later Head of News Department and Foreign and Commonwealth Office Spokesman from 1982 to 1984.

Between 1984 and 1987 he served as Head of Chancery at the UK Representation to the European Communities in Brussels, returning to London as Assistant Under-Secretary of State (Defence) at the FCO from 1988 to 1992.

From 1992 to 1995 he was Ambassador in Ankara. He took up post as the United Kingdom Permanent Representative to the North Atlantic Council and to the Western European Union on 3 April 1995.

After retiring from the Diplomatic Service, Goulden began to pursue his interest in the revolution in musical performance during the early nineteenth century and the role in this of the conductor and composer Michael Costa. He was awarded a PhD degree in musicology by Durham University in 2012. His PhD thesis was Michael Costa, England's First Conductor: The Revolution in Musical Performance in England, 1830–1880 and his book with the same title was published in 2015.

== Publications ==
- Michael Costa: England's First Conductor: The Revolution in Musical Performance in England, 1830–1880 (Ashgate, 2015). ISBN 978-1-4724-2717-5

== Personal ==
Lady (Diana) Goulden studied theatre at the Guildhall School of Music and Drama. They have a son (born 1967) and a daughter (born 1970)
