= Peter Dale Scott =

Canadian poet, academic, and diplomat (born 1929)

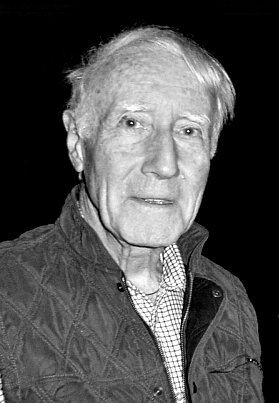
- Scott in 2007
- Born: January 11, 1929 (age 97); Montreal, Quebec, Canada
- Education: McGill University; University College, Oxford; Institut d'Etudes Politiques
- Occupations: Poet, Academic, Diplomat
- Spouse: Ronna Kabatznick
- Writing career
- Genres: Politics, Deep State, Poetry
- Notable works: Cocaine Politics (1991); Deep Politics and the Death of JFK (1993); Minding the Darkness (2000); The Road to 9/11 (2007); American War Machine (2010); The American Deep State (2014)
- Notable awards: Lannan Literary Award (2002)
- Website: www.peterdalescott.net

Peter Dale Scott (born 11 January 1929) is a Canadian academic, writer, former diplomat, and poet.

A son of the Canadian poet and constitutional lawyer F. R. Scott and painter Marian Dale Scott, he is best known for his critiques of deep politics and American foreign policy since the era of the Vietnam War.

Notably, he was a signatory in 1968 of the "Writers and Editors War Tax Protest" pledge, in which participants vowed to refuse tax payments in protest against the Vietnam War.

Although trained as a political scientist, Scott holds an atypical academic appointment as a poet-scholar in an English department.

== Academic and diplomatic career ==
After receiving undergraduate degrees in philosophy (first-class honours) and political science (second-class honours) from McGill University in 1949, he studied at the Institut d'Etudes politiques (France, 1949) and University College, Oxford (1950-1952) before, in 1955, receiving a Ph.D. in political science from McGill with a dissertation on the social and political philosophy of T. S. Eliot.

He briefly taught in McGill's political science department and spent four years (1957–1961) with the Canadian diplomatic service before, in 1961, joining the speech department at the University of California, Berkeley, as a lecturer. He was subsequently promoted to assistant professor of speech (1962), associate professor of English (1968), and professor of English (1980); since his nominal retirement in 1994, he is professor emeritus of English.

== Literary works ==
In terms of poetry, he is best known for his book-length epic poem Coming to Jakarta (subtitled "a poem about terror"), which describes in measured, prosodically regular verse the 1965 crisis in Indonesia that resulted in the Indonesian Civil War and the deaths of as many as half a million people, in which the CIA played a decisive role.

Scott is far from a stridently political poet, working always to connect the polemical to the personal. In Coming to Jakarta he writes:

To have learnt from terror
to see oneself
as part of the enemy
can be a reassurance

In the context of this emotional and psychological side of conflict, Scott alternates between descriptions of his own life—"dressed up in polished / gaiters with a buttonhook"—and the massive violence of his principal subject. Somewhere between confessional and scholarly, his poems often contain citations in the margins.

Scott has described the book-length Minding the Darkness (2000) as his most important poetic work, though he concedes that "Like other long poems by older men...it toys dangerously with abstract didactic principles." The work is intended as the culmination of a trilogy (also including Listening to the Candle [1992]) of which Coming to Jakarta was the inception.

His poetry has been translated into Indonesian, Serbo-Croatian, and Hungarian.

== Contemporary politics ==
Scott has written about the role of the deep state (as opposed to the public state). Rejecting the label of "conspiracy theory", he has used the phrase "deep politics" to describe his political concerns. His interest in contemporary history has spilled over into his works of poetry, some of which must contain marginal notes to explain to readers which documents or real-world news events are being referred to.

His book, The Road to 9/11 (2007), deals with geopolitical context of events leading to 9/11, and argues "how U.S. foreign policy since the 1960s has led to partial or total cover-ups of past domestic criminal acts, including, perhaps, the catastrophe of 9/11."

His books The Road to 9/11 and American War Machine are available in French under the titles La Route vers le Nouveau Désordre Mondial and La Machine de Guerre Américaine. The latter was reviewed in March 2011 by Bernard Norlain, a retired French five-star General of the Air Force.

In all, his books have been translated into French, German, Italian, Spanish, Russian, Chinese, and Indonesian. His articles have been translated into 16 languages, including Turkish, Arabic, Persian, Chinese, and Japanese.

An aspect of Scott's work that combines both his investigating interests and his poetry is illustrated by The Global Drug Meta-Group: Drugs, Managed Violence, and the Russian 9/11.

== Books ==
=== The War Conspiracy ===
In 1972, Bobbs-Merrill Company published Scott's book The War Conspiracy, which lays out Scott's theories of why the United States went to war in Vietnam. Kirkus Reviews said War Conspiracy is "undoubtedly one of the most important overviews to date of the subterranean reaches of the U.S. intelligence machine in Southeast Asia."

=== Deep Politics and the Death of JFK ===
Scott's book Deep Politics and the Death of JFK was published in 1993 by the University of California Press. Promotional reviews of the book were provided by Bruce Cumings, Gaeton Fonzi, and Oliver Stone.

Kirkus Reviews called the book a "[s]taggeringly well-researched and intelligent overview not only of the JFK assassination but also of the rise of forces undermining American democracy". The Kirkus review also described the book as a "kind of Rosetta stone for cracking open the deepest darkness in American politics." Publishers Weekly said that Scott's "thoughtful, extremely (and sometimes excessively) detailed book promises more than it actually delivers" and that "the 'facts' on which he relies are often the result of other people's not necessarily accurate reporting". According to PW, "[t]he book's most useful feature is a careful discussion of how U.S. Vietnam policy changed abruptly after Kennedy's death."

In a 2004 review for The Wilson Quarterly, Max Holland, recipient of a Studies in Intelligence Award from the Central Intelligence Agency, wrote that "Deep Politics is an unreadable compendium of 'may haves' and 'might haves,' non sequiturs, and McCarthy-style innuendo, with enough documentation to satisfy any paranoid." Shortly thereafter, Holland reiterated similar comments in a second piece written for Reviews in American History and criticized the University of California Press' editorial committee for approving the publication of the book: "This peer approval by a major university press illustrates the boundless and utter disbelief in the Warren Report that exists even in the highest reaches of the academy, and it also reveals the gross inattention given to the subject by serious historians."

Scott responded to Holland with a letter to the editor, stating: "I was disappointed to see those who have published me attacked vigorously for doing so by a major historical journal. I continue to believe that it is the job of the academy to open minds, not to close them." Scott observed that it is "gross intellectual cowardice to allege or imply falsehoods without supporting this accusation", and that "One might have thought in a 19-page attack... there would be at least a paragraph dealing with what I had actually written." He added that, "Holland demonstrates at the outset that he has done no basic research on Oswald, whom he believes to be the only important person in the case."

In 2013, former Salon editor-in-chief David Talbot included Deep Politics in his list of top seven "best books on the subject", describing the work as a "masterpiece, a meticulously detailed examination of the deep network of power that underlies the events in Dallas.... filled with provocative insights about how the upper circles of U.S. power actually operate."

On 11 October 1994 he testified at a public hearing of the Assassination Records Review Board in Washington, DC.

=== American War Machine ===
Of Scott's book, American War Machine: Deep Politics, the CIA Global Drug Connection, and the Road to Afghanistan (2010), whistleblower Daniel Ellsberg remarked: "I said of Scott's last brilliant take on this subject, Drugs, Oil and War, that 'It makes most academic and journalistic explanations of our past and current interventions read like government propaganda written for children.' Now Scott has written an even better book. Read it!"

== Bibliography ==
=== Non-fiction books ===
- The war conspiracy; the secret road to the second Indochina war. New York: Bobbs-Merrill (1972). ISBN 978-0980121360. OCLC 357579.
- The Assassinations: Dallas and Beyond—A Guide to Cover-Ups and Investigations. New York: Random House (1976). ISBN 0394401077. OCLC 2116096.
- Crime and Cover-Up: The CIA, the Mafia, and the Dallas-Watergate Connection (1977). ISBN 0878670661.
- The Iran-Contra Connection: Secret Teams and Covert Operations in Reagan Era. Boston: South End Press (1987). ISBN 0896082911. OCLC 473871007.
- Cocaine Politics: Drugs, Armies, and the CIA in Central America, with Jonathan Marshall. Berkeley, Calif.: University of California Press (1991). ISBN 978-0520214491.
- Deep Politics and the Death of JFK. Berkeley, Calif.: University of California Press (1993). ISBN 0520205197.
- Deep Politics II: The New Revelations in U.S. Government Files, 1994-1995: Essays on Oswald, Mexico, and Cuba. JFK Lancer Publications (1995). ISBN 978-0965658201.
- Oswald, Mexico, and Deep Politics: Revelations from CIA Records on the Assassination of JFK. New York: Skyhorse Publishing (1995). ISBN 978-1626360099.
- Drugs, Oil, and War: The United States in Afghanistan, Colombia, and Indochina. Lanham, MD: Rowman & Littlefield (2003). ISBN 0742525228.
- The Road to 9/11: Wealth, Empire and the Future of America. Berkeley, Calif.: University of California Press (2007). ISBN 0520237730. Glossary.
- American War Machine: Deep Politics, the CIA Global Drug Connection, and the Road to Afghanistan. Lanham, MD: Rowman & Littlefield (2010). ISBN 978-0742555945.
- The War Conspiracy: JFK, 9/11, and the Deep Politics of War (2013)
- The American Deep State: Wall Street, Big Oil, and the Attack on U.S. Democracy. Lanham, MD: Rowman & Littlefield (2014). ISBN 978-1442214255.
- Dallas '63: The First Deep State Revolt Against The White House. (Forbidden Bookshelf Series). New York: Open Road Media (2015). ISBN 978-1504051842
- Poetry and Terror: Politics and Poetics in Coming to Jakarta, with Freeman Ng. Lanham, MD: Lexington Books (Sep. 2018). ISBN 978-1498576666.
- Ecstatic Pessimist: Czeslaw Milosz, Poet of Catastrophe and Hope. Lanham, MD: Rowman & Littlefield (Mar. 2023). ISBN 978-1538172445
- Reading the Dream: A Post-Secular History of Enmindment. Lanham, MD: Rowman & Littlefield (Mar. 2024). ISBN 978-1-5381-8152-2

Book contributions

- Introduction to Accessories After the Fact: The Warren Commission, the Authorities & the Report on the JFK Assassination, by Sylvia Meagher (1976). ISBN 978-1620879979.
- Introduction to The Great Heroin Coup: Drugs, Intelligence, & International Fascism, by Henrik Krüger. Boston, Mass.: South End Press (1980). Edited by Jonathan Marshall. Translated by Jerry Meldon. ISBN 0896080315.
  - Originally published in Danish as Smukke Serge og Heroinen.
- "The U.S. Establishment and Al Qaeda". In: Haditha Ethics — From Iraq to Iran?, pp. 26-39.

=== Political articles ===
- "Vietnam: The Importance of January." The Nation, vol. 204, no. 3 (January 16, 1967), pp. 74-77.
- "Air America: Flying the U.S. Into Laos." Ramparts (February 1970).
- "Tying up loose end in Dallas." Pacific Sun (September 12-18, 1975), pp. 12, 14. Pacific News Service.
- "From Dallas to Watergate: The Longest Cover-Up." Ramparts (November 1973).
- "Was Oswald One of Castros Terrorists?: The Oswald-Castro Connection." Los Angeles Free Press (June 11, 1976), pp. -47.
- "Contragate: Reagan, Foreign Money, and the Contra Deal." Crime and Social Justice, vol. 27/28 (1987), pp. 126-161.
- "Noriega: Our Man in Panama." Convergence, no. 8 (Fall 1991), pp. 5-6. Christic Institute.
- "Washington and the Politics of Drugs." Variant, vol. 2, no. 11 (Summer 2000), pp. 2-5. Full issue.
- "The CIA's Secret Powers." Critical Asian Studies, vol. 35, no. 2 (2003), pp. 233-258. doi:10.1080/1467271032000090134.
- "Billions: The Politics of Influence in the United States, China and Israel," with Connie Bruck. Asia-Pacific Journal | Japan Focus, vol. 6, no. 7 (July 2, 2008).
- "Martial Law, the Financial Bailout, and the Afghan and Iraq Wars." Asia-Pacific Journal, vol. 2, Issue 4, no. 9 (January 10, 2009).
- "America's Afghanistan: The National Security and a Heroin-Ravaged State". The Asia-Pacific Journal, Vol. 20, Issue 3, No. 9, 17 May 2009.
- "Can the US Triumph in the Drug-Addicted War in Afghanistan? Opium, the CIA and the Karzai Administration". The Asia-Pacific Journal, Vol. 14, Issue 5, No. 10, 5 April 2010.
- "Continuity of Government Planning: War, Terror and the Supplanting of the U.S. Constitution". The Asia-Pacific Journal, Vol. 21, Issue 2, No. 10, May 24, 2010.
- "Kyrgyzstan, the U.S.and the Global Drug Problem: Deep Forces and the Syndrome of Coups, Drugs, and Terror". The Asia-Pacific Journal, Vol. 28, Issue 3, No. 10, 12 July 2010.
- "Operation Paper: The United States and Drugs in Thailand and Burma". The Asia-Pacific Journal, Vol. 44, Issue, 2, No. 10, 1 November 2010.
- "Is the State of Emergency Superseding the US Constitution? Continuity of Government Planning, War and American Society". The Asia-Pacific Journal, Vol. 48, Issue 1, No. 10, November 29, 2010.
- "The Doomsday Project, Deep Events, and the Shrinking of American Democracy". The Asia-Pacific Journal, Vol. 9, Issue 4, No. 3, January 24, 2011.
- "Who are the Libyan Freedom Fighters and Their Patrons?" The Asia-Pacific Journal, Vol. 9, Issue 13, No. 3, March 28, 2011.
- "Bosnia, Kosovo, and Now Libya: The Human Costs of Washington's On-Going Collusion with Terrorists". The Asia-Pacific Journal, Vol 9, Issue 31, No. 1, 1 August 2011.
- "Norway's Terror as Systemic Destabilization: Breivik, the Arms-for-Drugs Milieu, and Global Shadow Elites". The Asia-Pacific Journal, Vol. 9, Issue 34, No. 1, August 22, 2011.
- "The Doomsday Project and Deep Events: JFK, Watergate, Iran-Contra, and 9/11". The Asia-Pacific Journal, Vol. 9, Issue 47, No. 2, November 21, 2011.
- "Launching the U.S. Terror War: the CIA, 9/11, Afghanistan, and Central Asia". The Asia-Pacific Journal, Vol. 10, Issue 12, No. 3, March 19, 2012.
- "The NATO Afghanistan War and US-Russian Relations: Drugs, Oil, and War". The Asia-Pacific Journal, Vol. 10, Issue 22, No. 4, May 28, 2012.
- "Why Americans Must End America's Self-Generating Wars". The Asia-Pacific Journal, Vol. 10, Issue 36, No. 2, September 3, 2012.
- "Systemic Destabilization in Recent American History: 9/11, the JFK Assassination, and the Oklahoma City Bombing". The Asia-Pacific Journal, Vol. 10, Issue 39, No. 2, September 24, 2012.
- "America's Unchecked Security State, Part I: The Toxic Legacy of J. Edgar Hoover's Illegal Powers". The Asia-Pacific Journal, Vol. 11, Issue 17, No. 2, April 29, 2013.
- "America's Unchecked Security State: Part II: The Continuity of COG Detention Planning, 1948-2001". The Asia-Pacific Journal, Vol. 11, Issue 17, No. 3, 29 April 2013.
- "Washington's Battle Over Syrian Foreign Policy: Will Hawks Or Doves Prevail?". The Asia-Pacific Journal, Vol. 11, Issue 24, No. 1, June 17, 2013.
- "U.S. Government Protection of Al-Qaeda Terrorists and the U.S.-Saudi Black Hole". The Asia-Pacific Journal, Vol. 11, Issue 29, No. 1, July 28, 2013.
- "The Falsified War on Terror: How The US Has Protected Some of Its Enemies". The Asia-Pacific Journal, Vol. 11, Issue 40, No. 2, October 7, 2013.
- "The State, the Deep State, and the Wall Street Overworld". The Asia-Pacific Journal, Vol. 12, Issue 10, No. 5, March 10, 2014.
- "The Dulles Brothers, Harry Dexter White, Alger Hiss, and the Fate of the Private Pre-War International Banking System". The Asia-Pacific Journal, Vol. 12, Issue 16, No. 3, April 21, 2014.
- "The Fates of American Presidents Who Challenged the Deep State". The Asia-Pacific Journal, Vol. 12, Issue 43, No. 4, November 3, 2014.

=== Poetry ===
- Fantasy Poets, No. 6. 1952. OCLC 14115456
- Prepositions of Jet Travel. 1981. OCLC 9187198
- Rumors of No Law: Poems from Berkeley, 1968-1977. 1981. ISBN 978-0-9144768-8-7
- Heart's Field. 1986. OCLC 22099299
- Coming to Jakarta: A Poem About Terror. 1989. ISBN 0-8112-1095-2
- Listening to the Candle: A Poem on Impulse. 1992. ISBN 0-8112-1214-9
- Crossing Borders: Selected Shorter Poems. 1994. ISBN 0-8112-1284-X
- Minding the Darkness: A Poem for the Year 2000. 2000. ISBN 0-8112-1454-0
- Mosaic Orpheus. 2009. ISBN 978-0-7735-3506-0
- Tilting Point. 2012. ISBN 978-0-9850260-9-7
- Walking on Darkness. 2016. ISBN 978-1937679644
- Dreamcraft. 2024. ISBN 978-0-2280-2098-1

=== Poetry and politics ===
- Poetry and Terror: Politics and Poetics in Coming to Jakarta. 2018. ISBN 978-1498576666

=== Interviews ===
External audio
- "Deep Politics." Interview on KPFA (1994). Los Angeles: Pacifica Radio Archives. PRA AZ1004.

- "Spooks, Planes, and Heroin: Keys to Escalation in Indochina." (June 30, 1972). New York: WBAI. Interview by Nick Egleson.
- "A Conversation with Professor Peter Dale Scott" (February 1985). England: Lobster, no. 7. pp. 1-12. Edited by Robin Ramsey. Full issue.

== Filmography ==
=== Video ===
- "Spooks, Planes, and Heroin: Keys to Escalation in Indochina." (June 30, 1972). Interviewed by Nick Egleson for WBAI. Pacifica Radio Archives.

== See also ==
- State within a state
- Allegations of CIA drug trafficking
