= Geoffrey Prime =

British former spy

Geoffrey Arthur Prime (born 21 February 1938) is a former British spy who worked for the Royal Air Force as well as the Government Communications Headquarters (GCHQ). While working for these organizations, Prime disclosed information to the Soviet Union. He was convicted in the early 1980s under charges of espionage and child sexual abuse. He was sentenced to a total of 38 years' imprisonment but was released from prison in 2001.

== Life ==
Prime grew up in Staffordshire. After attending St. Joseph's College, Stoke-on-Trent, and having satisfactorily completed O-levels in languages, he became a junior wages clerk at a factory. In 1956, he was selected for national service in the Royal Air Force (RAF). Due to colour blindness, he became a store man in the RAF. He was later sent to learn Russian at the Joint Services School for Linguists (JSSL) in Crail, Scotland. He was appointed as an acting sergeant after having demonstrated proficiency in the language. However, he resumed duties as a store man after failing an advanced Russian course at the University of London three months after his enrolment in the course, and was subsequently demoted.

Posted to Kenya, Prime was promoted to corporal and learned Swahili in his spare time. Prime was shocked by the poverty in Kenya and the racism of European settlers in the country, and what he perceived was the exploitation of Kenya by the British colonial authorities. While there, he listened to Communist radio broadcasts and started reading the Soviet Weekly magazine. Upon returning to Britain in 1962, he reapplied for language training, spending a year at RAF Tangmere in Tangmere, Sussex, and was posted to the signals intelligence unit at RAF Gatow in Berlin, where he worked as a wireless operator monitoring Russian voice transmissions. He was reappointed as a sergeant in May 1968.

Prime was positively vetted and approved for security clearance in September 1968. His security clearance was subsequently reviewed in 1973, 1974, and 1976, being passed on each occasion. In November 1972, Prime consulted a psychiatrist, who subsequently cast doubt on his mental stability. Prime refrained from reporting his psychiatric appointments, because of concern over his security clearance being revoked.

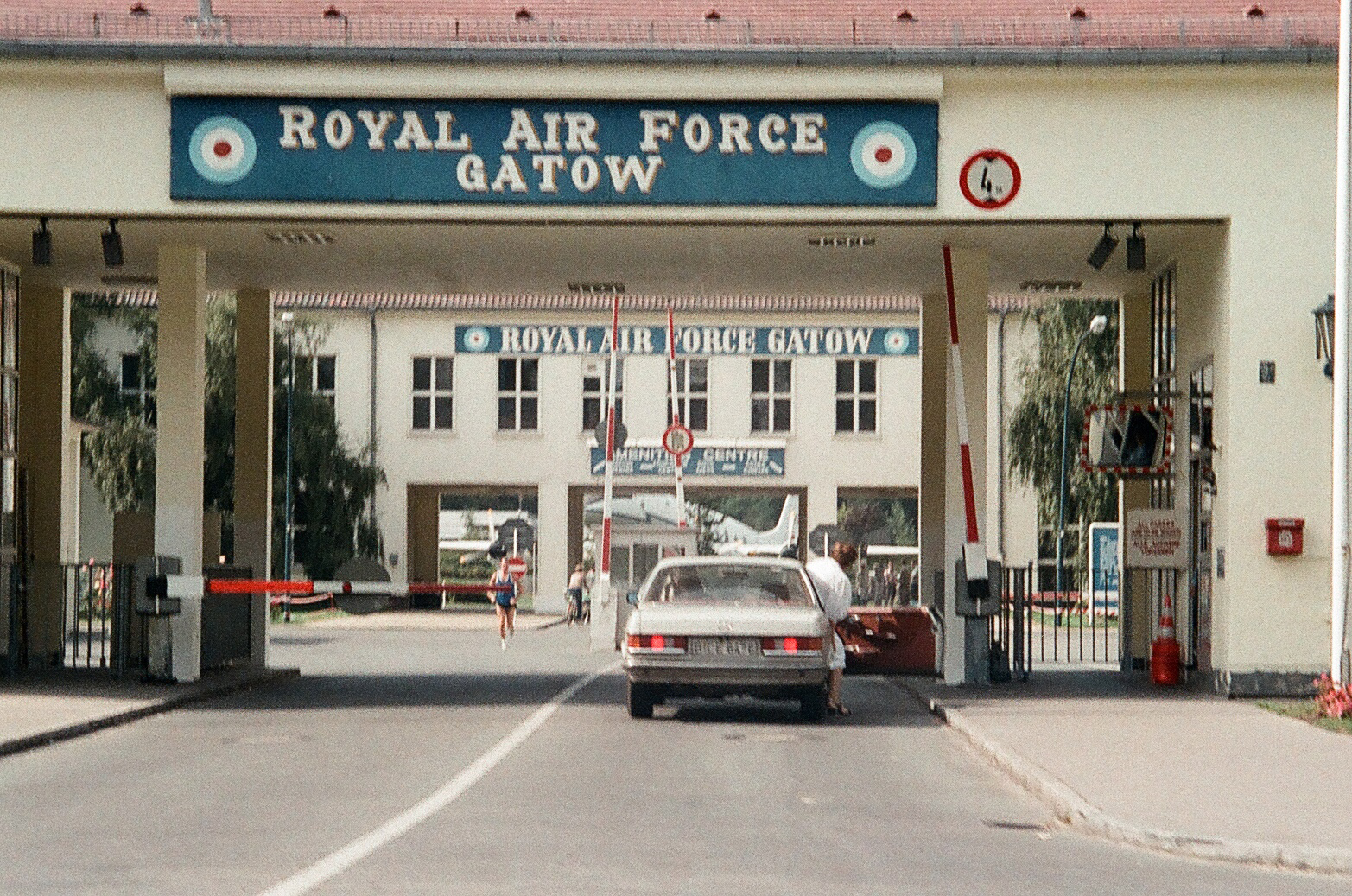
The main gate RAF Gatow in West Berlin. Prime worked at Gatow in the 1960s.

He returned to Britain to work for Government Communications Headquarters (GCHQ), and became a translator with the London Processing Group (LPG) at St Dunstan's Hill in the City of London. The LPG processed and translated material obtained by telephone intercepts and bugging by the British secret agencies. Prime started at the LPG in late 1968; he was part of a new group of entrants to LPG, recruited to replace older employees who joined during the Second World War.

In the mid-1970s, LPG moved to Cheltenham, the home of GCHQ, with Prime moving there in March 1976. He was part of the J30 section of J Division 'Special SIGINT' at GCHQ, which dealt with Soviet intelligence, and one of three officers with access to a vault in J Division, from which he was able to take documents home to photograph, and photocopy documents at will. In June 1976, he was promoted to Higher Intelligence Specialist in J Division and moved to lead a team of transcribers in J25, another part of the division.

In November 1976, Prime was moved to another section that focused on the intelligence analysis of transcribed material and appointed as Personal Security Supervisor for his section. He had to deliver lectures in his new role and failed to appear for a lecture on 22 September 1977, resigning shortly afterward.

== Career ==
As a train carrying Prime moved into West Berlin in 1968 he threw a message at a Soviet sentry guard, offering his services as a spy. He was subsequently contacted by the Soviets by the placing of a magnetic cylinder on the handle of his car. The cylinder contained instructions telling him to meet them at Friedrichstraße station, then in East Berlin. Prime met the KGB, the security agency of the Soviet Union, several times to prove his sincerity, and though he insisted he wished to work for them for ideological motives, they gave him money. Knowing that his RAF enlistment was to expire, the KGB successfully persuaded him to apply for a job at GCHQ in Cheltenham, and he returned to Britain.

Invited by the KGB on a secret visit to Germany, Prime was given training in spycraft at Karlshorst, under constant supervision. From KGB officers he learnt the use of invisible inks, one-time pads, and microdots. He was given a Minox camera to photograph sensitive documents and a briefcase with a hidden compartment. He was given the code name "Rowlands" and chose Austria as the location of all his future KGB meetings.

It was not typical for agents such as Prime to have meetings abroad with the KGB. Agents would typically be assigned a local handler to accompany them, but his method of contacting a Soviet soldier ensured that he was handled by the Third Directorate of the KGB. The Third Directorate handled military security within Soviet Army units, with the First Directorate of the KGB normally specializing in running espionage.

A British Security Service assessment of Prime's Soviet espionage career would describe the Third Directorate's handling as "incompetent and inept; had it been run more effectively, the damage done by Prime (which was anyway very considerable) would have been even worse." Prime subsequently met his handlers abroad in Vienna (1969), Ireland (1970), Rome (1970) and Cyprus (1972).

As he began his employment with GCHQ in England, Prime received Soviet radio messages at night and was informed of a dead letter drop in Esher, Surrey. At the drop, he found £400 and a note congratulating him. He used his Minox camera to photograph documents and sent them using microdots to East Berlin. Other dead letter drops used were in Abbey Wood in South-East London and the Banstead railway station in Surrey. Prime would use empty Coca-Cola cans to communicate at the drops as well as chalk marks on trees. Despite his use of drops, he preferred to meet his handlers personally, as the drops were not sufficient for the large amounts of material he produced for them.

While at the LPG, Prime was able to tell his Soviet handlers which of their lines were being monitored, and what information had been gleaned from them. In 1975, he met his KGB handlers in Austria, telling them of LPG's movement to Cheltenham. Prime was paid £800 at this meeting. Following his resignation from GCHQ in 1976, he twice resolved to defect to the Soviet Union but did not carry it out. At one point in 1977, he went as far as buying a ticket to Helsinki to defect, but turned back en route to the airport. He no longer listened for KGB messages and ceased to be an agent to them following his GCHQ resignation. Intelligence historian James Rusbridger wrote that he believed that Prime never stopped working for the KGB between his 1977 resignation and his 1982 arrest, given that he still had espionage equipment at the time of his arrest and that he possessed an internal GCHQ report that had been published in the weeks before his arrest.

In April 1980, Prime was contacted by the KGB, who invited him to Vienna, from where they went on a short river cruise. The KGB tried to persuade him to rejoin the GCHQ, but he refused. Before his departure from GCHQ, he had copied over 500 secret documents, and he subsequently gave the KGB fifteen reels of film in Vienna in May 1980, for which he was paid £600, and gave them their last material in November 1981. For the 1981 material, he was paid £4,000, signifying the importance of the material. The 1981 material was later described as most damaging of all by the head of GCHQ's Security Division.

=== Nature and impact of espionage ===
In 1975, Prime had access to details of the British decryption efforts of Soviet communications, including their successes and failures.

Prime had been given a US 'Byeman' security clearance when he was appointed to work at GCHQ's J Division. The clearance enabled him to interpret material received from two United States SIGINT satellites, Rhyolite and Canyon. The satellites detected and collected unencrypted telemetry from Soviet missile launches.

Intercepted material obtained by the Canyon satellite concerned Soviet, Chinese, Vietnamese and Middle Eastern communications from VHF and UHF wavebands and microwave telephone communications. In view of the sheer amount of data obtained, the United States National Security Agency asked its UKUSA allies to help them interpret it. As well as Prime's espionage activities, two American spies who had been recruited by the KGB, John Anthony Walker and Christopher Boyce, also severely affected the SIGINT efforts of Western intelligence agencies.

Prime's most damaging disclosure to the Soviet Union was the revelation of 'Project Sambo', a programme designed to track the secret radio transmissions of Soviet submarines. In conjunction with SOSUS, a joint UKUSA undersea microphone project, and airborne maritime patrol craft fitted with sonar, the West tracked Soviet submarines.

=== Subsequent investigations ===
Following Prime's arrest and trial, the Security Commission was charged to investigate any breaches of security that may have occurred as a result of his activities and to advise on any changes to security. The commission, consisting of Lord Bridge of Harwich, Lord Justice Griffiths, Lord Allen of Abbeydale and General Sir Hugh Beach, completed its report in May 1983. Part of the report contained classified information and was not published. Presenting the report, Baroness Young said of Prime that "There is no doubt that his disclosures caused exceptionally grave damage to the interests of this country and its allies." The commission did not interview Prime about his activities.

The report concluded that no evidence was found to "contradict Prime's statement that he acted alone", that he had an accomplice or that the Soviet Union had another mole within GCHQ. Weaknesses were found in security at GCHQ, with the security around photocopying facilities facing particular criticism. These security weaknesses at GCHQ had previously been exposed by whistleblower Jock Kane in 1973.

The report also proposed a pilot scheme to test the feasibility of polygraph security screening in intelligence and security agencies. Polygraph questioning was recommended to be limited to an examination of exposure to approaches by hostile intelligence services, rather than questions on negative lifestyle attributes. It was reported in January 1983 that Prime had assembled lists of possible targets for blackmail among his GCHQ colleagues. The revelations within the lists would lead to five GCHQ employees being demoted and losing their security clearances; none, however, were under pressure from the Soviet Union. MI5 believed that in 1977 Prime had been replaced as a Soviet mole in GCHQ by another spy of perhaps even greater importance and access.

== Personal life ==
Prime met his first wife, Helena Organ, through a marriage bureau in August 1969. Helena found a large amount of money in their house in April 1973, and it is believed that Prime confessed to her that the money was acquired as a result of his involvement with the KGB. Helena told a Mrs Barsby, a friend of hers, of Prime's confession, and Mrs Barsby threatened to tell the police. Prime's vetting check was due in 1973 and Barsby was interviewed by officers. Barsby did not tell officers of her knowledge of Prime's confession to his wife, due to her dislike of the officers' questioning. The Primes divorced in 1974.

After moving to Cheltenham in 1976, Prime lived with a divorcée, Rhona Ratcliffe, who had three young children. They married in June 1977. Prime was respected by the children and treated them well. Following his resignation from GCHQ Prime sold wine and worked as a taxi driver for Cheltax Cheltenham.

=== Sexual crimes ===
Prime's first marriage was not successful owing to his paedophilic interest in young girls, some of whom he kept notes on and telephoned. Prime constructed a system of 2,287 index cards bearing details of individual girls; each card contained notes and photographs, information on their parents' routines and details about when they were alone at home. In 1981, Prime attacked two young girls, on two separate occasions, but escaped undiscovered. In late 1982, Prime attacked the third girl, at her home, but she screamed and he ran away, escaping in his car. A farmworker was able to give a detailed description of Prime's distinctive car to police, who visited him the next day. The police identified the car in his driveway and noticed the similarity of him to an identikit photograph of the suspect. The police took Prime's fingerprints, and left without arresting him.

That evening Prime told his wife, Rhona, of the police visit and confessed the nature of his sexual crimes, and his espionage activities to her. Prime admitted the assaults to police the next day, and was arrested, and his car and house searched. The police found the index cards and a briefcase that concealed spying equipment. Three weeks later, after discovering a large amount of espionage equipment in their house, Rhona contacted the police and told them of Prime's work for the Soviets.

Prime was a member of the Paedophile Information Exchange, a pro-paedophilic activist group. In 1982 the Prime Minister Margaret Thatcher denied knowing of Prime's membership of the group in response to a written question from Geoffrey Dickens MP.

== Sentencing and release ==
On 10 November 1982 Prime pleaded guilty to seven espionage counts, and three counts of sex offences against children. His sex offences included indecently assaulting three girls aged 11 to 14. He was sentenced by Lord Lane, the Lord Chief Justice, to a total of 38 years, 35 for offences under section 1 of the Official Secrets Act 1911 and three for his sex offences. His defence counsel was George Carman QC. At his trial Prime concluded that the cause of his spying was partly "...as a result of a misplaced idealistic view of Soviet socialism which was compounded by basic psychological problems within myself."

The British media were prevented from reporting on the Prime affair until after his trial, which was conducted in secret session. In 1983 Prime applied unsuccessfully to get his sentence reduced. In rejecting his appeal Lord Justice Lawton told Prime that "In a time of war such conduct would have merited the death penalty."

Prime was released from HM Prison Rochester in March 2001, after serving half of his sentence, and placed on the Sex Offender Register. Prime would have been freed automatically in 2007 after two-thirds of his sentence had been served, but at that time prisoners were often released on licence having served half their sentence, if for example, they showed remorse for having committed the offences wherewith they had been convicted. Prime was debriefed by MI5 before his release, and was ordered to register with police wherever he lives. Prime's initial address was leaked to the media, and a second secret address was found.

Prime's wife, Rhona, wrote a book in 1984 about the Prime affair, Time of Trial, but distanced herself from him during his imprisonment, and subsequently remarried.

Detective Chief Inspector D. J. Cole, in charge of the police investigation, wrote a book about the case after his retirement - Geoffrey Prime: The Imperfect Spy.

== See also ==
- Child sexual abuse in the United Kingdom
