= James Waddell (civil servant) =

British Civil Servant

Sir James Henderson Waddell CB (5 October 1914 – 3 January 2004) was a British civil servant who helped reform the police in the wake of corruption scandals in the 1960s.

Born in Edinburgh, Waddell was educated at George Heriot's School and was an alumnus of the University of Edinburgh, where he graduated with a first in history. As a civil servant Waddell worked initially for the Unemployment Assistance Board, having passed the civil service administrative exam in 1936. Waddell was moved to the Ministry of Information during the Second World War and was called up to serve in the British Armed Forces in 1942. Before his military service Waddell had been a pacifist, but had lost his pacifist leanings in the wake of the London Blitz. Waddell was wounded in his leg after landing in France after the Normandy landings, and served as a second lieutenant in the Reconnaissance Corps of the British Army. His service number was 307300.

In 1946 Waddell resumed his civil service career, working for the Ministry of Housing and Local Government for 20 years, punctuated by a brief interlude in the Cabinet Office. Waddell joined the Home Office in 1966, where he was placed in charge of the department dealing with the police, public order, and security. The police service was being drastically reorganised, including a sharp reduction in the number of separate forces, following the Police Act 1964. There were also some special problems affecting the Metropolitan Police Service; a Times exposé had alleged widespread corruption, and some of the allegations turned out to be well justified. Waddell worked with the Commissioners, first John Waldron and then Robert Mark, to clear up the mess. He also tried to get the Metropolitan Police to start taking black recruits, a proposition that was adopted with some vigour by Home Secretary Roy Jenkins. Work began on devising a new system of dealing with complaints against the police.

Waddell was appointed by Prime Minister James Callaghan to investigate Jock Kane's claims of fraud and corruption at the Government Communications Headquarters (GCHQ) intelligence agency. Waddell's report was finished in April 1979, and never published. The new prime minister, Margaret Thatcher, described Kane's allegations as "unfounded" to Parliament, and as a consequence Waddell inferred to a journalist that his report had not concluded that Kane's allegations were unfounded.

Waddell married his wife, Dorothy, in 1940, she died in 2001. They had two children, a son and daughter, who survived him at his death.
