= Ministry of Production =

The Ministry of Production was a British government department created in February 1942, initially under the title Ministry of War Production, but the following month "War" was dropped from the title. The Ministry became was a critical part of the British administrative machine that contributed to victory over the Axis during the Second World War.

Its purpose was to fill a gap in the machinery of government between, on the one hand, the Ministry of Supply, the Ministry of Aircraft Production and the Admiralty, which were responsible for supplies to the Armed Forces, and, on the other hand, the Ministry of Labour and National Service, which was responsible for the distribution of labour between civilian occupations, war industries and the Armed Forces. The Ministry was seen as essential to coordinate all decisions on the supply of raw materials, particularly as a result of the increased support and negotiations with the US government following their entry into the war in December 1941. The Materials Committee of the Government was headed by the Ministry.

== Leadership ==
Its head was the Minister of Production. The first Minister was Max Aitken, 1st Baron Beaverbrook. In March 1942 he was succeeded by Oliver Lyttelton, 1st Viscount Chandos, then Sir Robert Sinclair, 1st Baron Sinclair of Cleeve from 1943 through 1945.
