= MI6: Fifty Years of Special Operations =

- Author: Stephen Dorril
- Genre: Intelligence
- Publication date: 2000
- Media type: Print (hardback)

MI6: Fifty Years of Special Operations is a book by author Stephen Dorril. In the United States, this book was published under the title MI6: Inside the Covert World of Her Majesty's Secret Intelligence Service. The book alleges that MI6 has functioned as the backstair interventionist instrument of British foreign policy. The author tells of disruptive actions by secret services like successful coups such as the overthrow of the moderate Iranian leader, Mohammed Mossadeq, who was hated by the British because he had nationalized Iran's oil industry, attempted assassinations in Libya and Egypt, forging Swiss bank account documents in East Germany, and psychological warfare such as planting of false information, secret funding of propaganda and smearing opponents.

== Inaccuracies and criticism ==
It has been criticized for its inaccuracies and use of dubious sources. Notably in the book, Dorril claimed that Nelson Mandela was recruited by MI6, writing on page 722:

"Another MI6 catch was ANC leader Nelson Mandela. Whether Mandela was recruited in London before he was imprisoned in South Africa is not clear, but it is understood that on a recent trip to London he made a secret visit to MI6's training section to thank the Service for its help in foiling two assassination attempts directed against him soon after he became President."

Despite the fact that the name "Mandela" only appears twice in the entire book, which is over 900 pages, the press coverage surrounding this prompted Mandela to "angrily" reply with a denial, the South African government also denied it and British officials criticized the book's accuracy. Dorril responded to the criticism, writing: "there is nothing implausible in the idea that someone such as Nelson Mandela might have been recruited." Christopher Andrew reviewed the book for The Times, explaining: "It does not seem to occur to Mr Dorril that his failure to evaluate the reliability of this story does more serious damage to the credibility of his book than to Mandela's reputation." As for the content, Andrews wrote: "The first 31 chapters of his 900-page book rarely go beyond the mid-1960s: the story of the next 35 years by contrast is compressed into only five chapters. Mr Dorril's interpretation is equally lop-sided."
