= Stephen Dorril =

British academic, author, and journalist (born 1955)

- Born: July 17, 1955 (age 71); Kidderminster, Worcestershire, England

Stephen Dorril (born 17 July 1955) is a British academic, author, and journalist. He is a former senior lecturer in the journalism department of Huddersfield University and ex-director of the university's Oral History Unit. His books have mostly been about the UK's intelligence services. In 1983, Dorril co-founded the magazine Lobster with Robin Ramsay. He has been a consultant to BBC's Panorama programme.

== Career ==
External videos
- "Secrecy is the British Disease." Extended interview with Stephen Dorril.

Dorril has appeared as a specialist and consultant regarding intelligence matters on several radio and television programs: Panorama, Media Show, Secret History, World at One, NBC News, Canadian television, History Channel, French television, and others. Dorril was due to serve as a consultant on a Channel Five series on the intelligence services. His first book Honeytrap, written with Anthony Summers about the Profumo affair, was one of the sources used for the film Scandal (1989).

== Works ==
=== Books ===
- Honeytrap: The Secret Worlds of Stephen Ward, with Anthony Summers. London: Weidenfeld & Nicolson (1987). ISBN 0340429739.
- Smear!: Wilson and the Secret State. New York: HarperCollins (1992). ISBN 0586217134.
- The Silent Conspiracy: Inside the Intelligence Services in the 1990s. Portsmouth, New Hampshire: Heinemann (1993). ISBN 0434201626.
- MI6: Fifty Years of Special Operations. London: 4th Estate (2000). ISBN 1857020936.
  - US Edition: New York: Free Press (2002)
  - UK Edition: London: Touchstone (2002)
- MI6: Inside the Covert World of Her Majesty's Secret Intelligence Service. New York: Simon & Schuster (2002). ISBN 0743203798.
- Blackshirt: Sir Oswald Mosley and British Fascism. New York: Viking Press (2006). ISBN 0670869996. See: Excerpted notes + appendix.

=== Media appearances ===
- The Man Who Knew Too Much (2021)
  - Extended interview.
- L'affaire Jack King (2015)
- BBC Inside Out: Yorkshire and Lincolnshire (2002)
- Spy Secrets: Playing Dirty (2003)
