= Robert Sinclair, 1st Baron Sinclair of Cleeve =

Robert John Sinclair, 1st Baron Sinclair of Cleeve (29 July 1893 – 4 March 1979), was a British businessman and public servant.

He was the son of Robert Henry Sinclair. He was a tobacco wholesaler in Newcastle-upon-Tyne whose family firm traded as Sinclair (Robert) Tobacco Co., Ltd. This company was acquired by the Imperial Tobacco Company in 1930, of which company Sinclair was later chairman from 1947 to 1959 and president. He was also Chairman of the Finance Corporation for Industry and of the Bristol Waterworks Company.

During the Second World War, Sinclair served as Director-General of Army Requirements at the War Office from 1939 to 1942 and as Chief Executive at the Ministry of Production from 1943 to 1945. After the war he was President of the Federation of British Industries from 1949 to 1951, a Member of the Security Commission from 1966 to 1977, and Pro-Chancellor of Bristol University from 1946 to 1970. He also held the honorary post of High Sheriff of Somerset. In 1957 he was raised to the peerage as Baron Sinclair of Cleeve, of Cleeve in the County of Somerset.

Lord Sinclair of Cleeve died in March 1979, aged 85, and was succeeded in the barony by his son John.

== Arms ==
Coat of arms of Robert Sinclair, 1st Baron Sinclair of Cleeve
Crest In front of a saltire Argent a dove Proper beaked and legged Gules in the beak an olive branch also Proper. Escutcheon Or a cross engrailed Sable in the first quarter a sword erect Proper on a chief also Sable three martlets Gold Supporters Dexter, a griffin Sable; sinister, a unicorn Argent; each gorged with a Or white may leaved and flowered Proper. Motto Credo (I Believe)

Peerage of the United Kingdom
New creation	Baron Sinclair of Cleeve; 1957–1979	Succeeded by John Robert Kilgour Sinclair
