= Security Commission =

The Security Commission, sometimes known as the Standing Security Commission, was a UK non-departmental public body or quango established in 1964 to investigate breaches of security in the public sector. It was abolished in 2010, on the basis that government would investigate breaches of security as and when they occurred.

== Origins ==
The idea of the Security Commission, initially canvassed by the Prime Minister Harold Macmillan, was first publicly suggested by his successor Sir Alec Douglas-Home in a Parliamentary debate about the Denning Report into the Profumo affair on 16 December 1963. Douglas-Home envisaged that the commission would consist of retired civil servants and would be chaired by someone from the judiciary. It was to investigate matters referred to it by the Prime Minister of the day and issue its reports back to the Prime Minister, with the Leader of the Opposition consulted before any inquiry and after the report was completed. Douglas-Home met with the Leader of the Opposition Harold Wilson (who had given a cautious welcome to the proposal) on 22 January to agree the details.

== Formation ==
On 23 January 1964 the formation of the Security Commission was announced, with the terms of reference:

If so requested by the Prime Minister, to investigate and report upon the circumstances in which a breach of security is known to have occurred in the public service and upon any related failure of departmental security arrangements or neglect of duty; and, in the light of any such investigations, to advise whether any change in security arrangements is necessary or desirable.

Harold Wilson expanded the remit on 10 May 1965 to allow the Commission to investigate circumstances where a breach of security might have occurred.

== Reports ==
The Security Commission issued fifteen reports during its existence.

Date	Composition	Circumstances	Reference
June 1965	Lord Justice Winn; Lord Normanbrook; Sir Caspar John	Convictions of civil servants Frank Clifton Bossard and Percy Sidney Allen under s. 1 of the Official Secrets Act 1911	Cmnd. 2722
July 1966	Lord Justice Winn; Lord Sinclair of Cleeve; Sir Dudley Ward	Discovery of classified documents at the home of Squadron Leader Peter John Reen RAF, to which he had official access before he retired in 1961	Cmnd. 3151
June 1967	Lord Justice Winn; Sir Caspar John; Sir Dudley Ward	Circumstances in which Miss Helen Mary Keenan, typist in the Cabinet Office, had been charged under the Official Secrets Act 1911	Cmnd. 3365
November 1968	Lord Justice Winn; Sir Dudley Ward; Sir Harold Kent	Circumstances in which Douglas Ronald Britten, a Chief Technician in the RAF, pleaded guilty to offences under the Official Secrets Act 1911	Cmnd. 3856
January 1969	Lord Justice Winn; Lord Sinclair of Cleeve; Sir Dudley Ward	Circumstances in which Clive Edwin Bland, photoprinter in the Ministry of Technology, pleaded guilty to offences under the Official Secrets Act 1911	Cmnd. 3892
May 1973	Lord Diplock; Lord Sinclair of Cleeve; Sir Dudley Ward	Circumstances in which Sub-Lieutenant David James Bingham and Mr Leonard Michael Hinchliffe pleaded guilty to offences under the Official Secrets Act 1911	Cmnd. 5362
July 1973	Lord Diplock; Lord Sinclair of Cleeve; Sir Dudley Ward; Lord Garner; Sir Philip Allen	To verify that security was not endangered as a result of incidents leading to the resignations from the Government of Earl Jellicoe and Lord Lambton	Cmnd. 5367
May 1981	Lord Diplock; Lord Bridge of Harwich; Lord Greenhill of Harrow; Sir Horace Law	Circumstances in which John Barry Wagstaff, Ministry of Defence civil servant, had been charged with an offence under the Official Secrets Act 1911	Cmnd. 8235
May 1983	Lord Bridge of Harwich; Lord Justice Griffiths; Lord Allen of Abbeydale; Sir Hugh Beach	Breaches of security which may have occurred arising out of the case of Geoffrey Arthur Prime, convicted under the Official Secrets Act 1911	Cmnd. 8876
March 1984	Lord Bridge of Harwich; Lord Justice Griffiths; Lord Allen of Abbeydale; Sir Hugh Beach	Breaches of security which may have occurred arising out of the case of Lance Corporal Philip Leslie Aldridge, convicted under the Official Secrets Act 1911	Cmnd. 9212
May 1985	Lord Bridge of Harwich; Lord Allen of Abbeydale; Sir Michael Palliser; Sir Alasdair Steedman	Breaches of security which may have occurred arising out of the case of Michael John Bettaney, convicted under the Official Secrets Act 1911	Cmnd. 9514
October 1986	Lord Griffiths; Lord Justice Lloyd; Lord Allen of Abbeydale; Sir Hugh Beach	Breaches of security which may have occurred arising out of the case of eight members of 9 Signal Regiment who have been charged under the Official Secrets Act 1911, and any similarities with the case of Senior Aircraftsman Paul John Davies who has been charged with a similar offence	Cmnd. 9923
July 1995	Lord Lloyd of Berwick; Sir John Blelloch; Sir Derek Boorman; Lord Tombs	Breaches of security which may have occurred arising out of the case of Michael John Smith, convicted under the Official Secrets Act 1911	Cm. 2930
February 2000	Lord Lloyd of Berwick; Dame Elizabeth Butler-Sloss; Sir John Foley; Sir Clive Whitmore	Breaches of security which may have occurred arising out of the case of Chief Petty Officer Steven Hayden, convicted under the Official Secrets Act 1989	Cm. 4578
May 2004	Dame Elizabeth Butler-Sloss; Sir Charles Mantell; Sir John Goulden; Sir Iain Vallance	To review vetting of those who join or belong to the Royal Households, those working closely with them, or who otherwise gain access to Royal residences	Cm. 6177

== Members ==
Latterly its members were:

- Lady Justice Butler-Sloss,(Chairman)
- Lord Justice Mantell (Alternative chairman)
- Lieutenant General Sir John Foley
- Sir Clive Whitmore
- Sir Iain Vallance
- Sir John Goulden
