= Robin Ramsay (editor) =

British political writer (1948-)

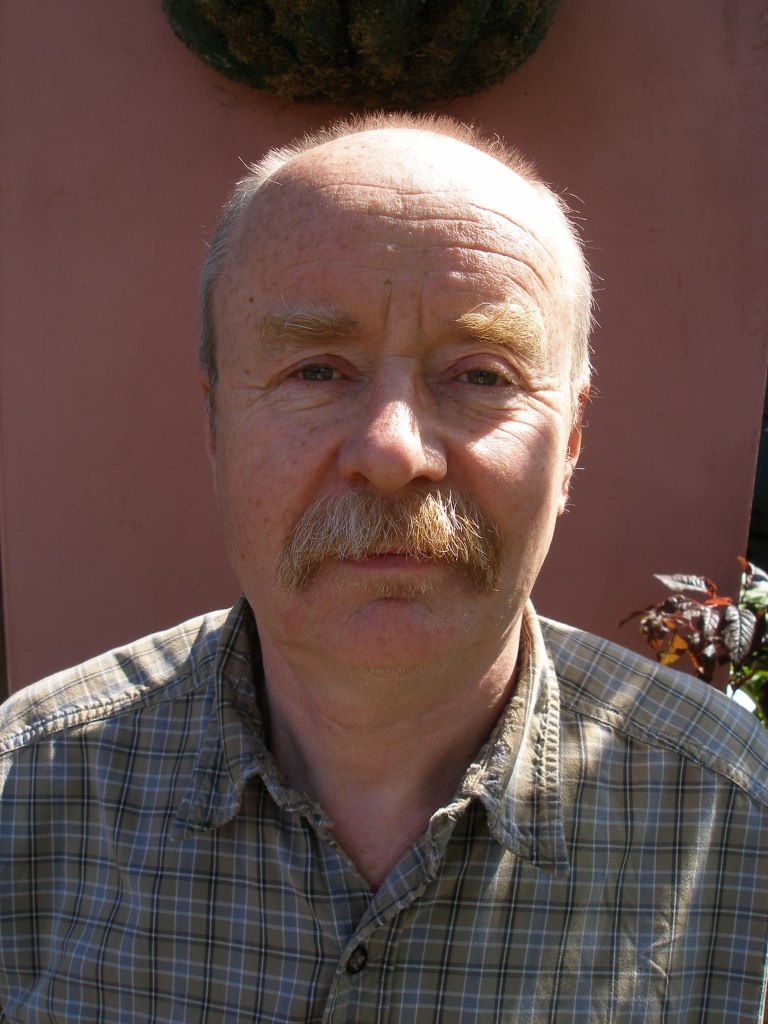
Robin Ramsay in 2007

Robin Ramsay (born 1948) is a Scottish author, and co-founder and editor of the magazine Lobster. Ramsay writes about politics and conspiracy theories. His books have been published by HarperCollins and Pocket Essentials. His writings have resulted in him receiving death threats from the fascist group Combat 18.

The eldest child of a food chemist father and housewife mother. Ramsay was born in Edinburgh and studied at Stirling University but left after a term and moved to London. He later graduated from Hull University. During his time at Hull, he became interested in the John F. Kennedy assassination.

While investigating the case, Ramsay met fellow Kennedy assassination enthusiast Stephen Dorril. Together they started a magazine about the influence of intelligence and security services on politics, Lobster, in September 1983. Ramsay also draws on his research and writes a regular monthly column in the Fortean Times.

== Conspiracy theories ==
Although Ramsay's magazine Lobster includes articles on conspiracy theories, and he has written a book on the subject, Gareth McLean (writing in The Scotsman newspaper) says that Ramsay "hates conspiracy theories", quoting him as saying "The term 'conspiracy theory' is used by various intellectual establishments to dismiss people like me. It's irritating but there's nothing you can do about it."

== Personal ==
Guardian journalist Robert McCrum in 1991 described Ramsay as "an extrovert, fast-talking Scot with jack-of-all-trades experience in alternative journalism, jazz music and the theatre".

In July 1988, Ramsay made an extended appearance on the Channel 4 discussion programme After Dark, alongside Merlyn Rees, H. Montgomery Hyde and others.

== Published books ==
- Smear: Wilson and the Secret State (1992) HarperCollins, ISBN 0-586-21713-4 (co-authored with Stephen Dorril)
- Prawn Cocktail Party: The Hidden Power of New Labour (1998) Vision Paperbacks, ISBN 1-901250-20-2
- New Labour (2002) Pocket Essentials, ISBN 1-903047-83-8
- Conspiracy Theories (2006) Pocket Essentials, ISBN 1-904048-65-X
- Politics and Paranoia (2008) Picnic Publishing ISBN 0-9556105-4-0
- Who Shot JFK? (2nd ed. 2009) Pocket Essentials, ISBN 1-84243-232-X

=== Articles ===
- Robin Ramsay, "The Gemstone File", International Times, Vol.4, Number 11, 1978, retrieved 17 August 2012

== Bibliography ==
- "Sexed-up files, lies and surveillance tapes ... One man's search to uncover what lies beneath", Hull Daily Mail, 13 July 2007 Friday, page 10
- "Shock Lobster", Sunday Herald, 17 August 2003. Online at U. Utah
