= List of Jewish communities in the United Kingdom =

This is a list of Jewish communities in the United Kingdom, including synagogues, yeshivot (Note: A yeshiva (Hebrew: ישיבה) is a centre for the study of Torah and the Talmud in Orthodox Judaism.) and Hebrew schools. For a list of buildings which were previously used as synagogues see List of former synagogues in the United Kingdom.

== England ==
According to the 2021 Census there are around 270,000 Jews in the UK. Over 260,000 of these are in England, which contains the second largest Jewish population in Europe (behind France) and the fifth largest Jewish community worldwide. The majority of the Jews in England live in and around London, with almost 160,000 Jews in London itself and a further 20,800 in nearby Hertfordshire, primarily in Bushey (4,500), Borehamwood (3,900) and Radlett (2,300). The next most significant population is in Greater Manchester with a community of slightly more than 25,000, primarily in the boroughs of Bury (10,360), Salford (7,920), Manchester itself (2,725) and Trafford (2,490). There are also significant communities in Leeds (6,760), Gateshead (3,000), Brighton and Hove (2,730), Liverpool (2,330), Birmingham (2,150) and Southend (2,080).

=== East of England ===
==== Cambridge and East Anglia ====
===== Cambridgeshire =====
Name	Affiliation/ritual	Location	Web	Ref	Images
Beth Shalom Reform Synagogue	Progressive Judaism	Cambridge	website		
Cambridge Traditional Jewish Congregation (Thompson's Lane Synagogue)	Independent (Ashkenazi) Orthodox	Cambridge	website		
Chabad of Cambridge	Chabad	Cambridge	website		
Peterborough Liberal Jewish Community	Progressive Judaism	Peterborough	website		

===== Norfolk =====
Name	Affiliation/ritual	Location	Web	Ref	Images
Norwich Liberal Jewish Community	Progressive Judaism	Norwich	website		
Norwich Synagogue	Ashkenazi Orthodox	Norwich	website		

===== Suffolk =====
Name	Affiliation/ritual	Location	Web	Ref	Images
Suffolk Liberal Jewish Community	Progressive Judaism	Suffolk	website		

==== East Midlands ====
===== Derbyshire =====
Name	Affiliation/ritual	Location	Web	Ref	Images
Derbyshire Jewish Community	Unaffiliated	Derbyshire	website		

===== Leicestershire =====
Name	Affiliation/ritual	Location	Web	Ref	Images
Leicester Hebrew Congregation	Ashkenazi Orthodox	Leicester	website		
Leicester Progressive Jewish Congregation	Progressive Judaism	Leicester	website		

===== Lincolnshire =====
Name	Affiliation/ritual	Location	Web	Ref	Images	Notes
Grimsby Hebrew Congregation (Sir Moses Montefiore Synagogue)	Ashkenazi Orthodox	Grimsby	website			See History of the Jews of Grimsby
Lincoln Jewish Minyan	Independent and egalitarian	Lincoln	website			
Lincolnshire Jewish Community	Progressive Judaism	Lincoln	website		Frontage of Jews' Court, Lincoln, where the community holds services	Its services are held in the lecture room at Jews' Court, Lincoln

===== Northamptonshire =====
Name	Affiliation/ritual	Location	Web	Ref	Images
Northampton Hebrew Congregation	Ashkenazi Orthodox	Northampton	website		

===== Nottinghamshire =====
Name	Affiliation/ritual	Location	Web	Ref	Images
Chabad Lubavitch of Nottingham	Chabad	Nottingham	website		
Nottingham Hebrew Congregation	Ashkenazi Orthodox	Nottingham	website		
Nottingham Liberal Synagogue	Progressive Judaism	Nottingham	website		

==== Essex ====
Name	Affiliation/ritual	Location	Web	Ref	Images
New Essex Masorti Synagogue	Masorti Judaism	Buckhurst Hill	website		
Chabad Buckhurst Hill	Chabad	Buckhurst Hill	website		
Chabad Epping	Chabad	Epping	website		
Chabad Southend	Chabad	Westcliff-on-Sea, Southend-on-Sea	website		
Chigwell & Hainault Synagogue	Ashkenazi Orthodox	Chigwell	website		
Colchester and District Jewish Community	Unaffiliated	Colchester	website		
Harlow and Chelmsford Jewish Community	Progressive Judaism	Harlow	website		
The Jewish Congregation of Canvey Island	Ashkenazi Orthodox	Canvey Island			
Loughton Synagogue	Kehillas Federation	Loughton	website		
Tikvah Chadasha (Brentwood Reform Synagogue)	Progressive Judaism	Shenfield	website		
Southend and District Reform Synagogue	Progressive Judaism	Westcliff-on-Sea, Southend-on-Sea	website		
Southend & Westcliff Hebrew Congregation	Ashkenazi Orthodox	Westcliff-on-Sea, Southend-on-Sea	website		
Westcliff Chareidi Synagogue	Charedi	Westcliff-on-Sea, Southend-on-Sea	website		

==== Hertfordshire ====
Name	Affiliation/ritual	Location	Web	Ref	Images
Borehamwood and Elstree Synagogue	Ashkenazi Orthodox	Borehamwood	website		
Kehillat Nashira: Borehamwood Partnership Minyan	Independent Orthodox; adhering to halachic standards and practices while including women in ritual leadership roles	Borehamwood	website		
Ohr Yisrael Synagogue	Kehillas Federation	Borehamwood	website		
Rambam Sephardi (Spanish & Portuguese Jews' Congregation of Elstree & Borehamwood)	Sephardi Orthodox	Borehamwood	website		
South Herts & Edgware Masorti (SHEMA)	Masorti Judaism	Borehamwood and Edgware	website		
Yavneh College	Modern Orthodox	Borehamwood	website		
Bushey Chabad	Chabad	Bushey	website		
Immanuel College	Modern Orthodox	Bushey	website		Caldecote Towers, Immanuel College View of Caldecote Towers from the Rose Garden
The Liberal Synagogue Elstree	Progressive Judaism	Elstree	website		
Chabad Lubavitch of Radlett	Chabad	Radlett	website		
Hertsmere Jewish Primary School	United Synagogue	Radlett	website		
Radlett Reform Synagogue	Progressive Judaism	Radlett	website		
Radlett United Synagogue	United Synagogue	Radlett	website		
St Albans Masorti Synagogue	Masorti Judaism	St Albans	website		
St Albans United Synagogue	United Synagogue	St Albans	website		
Shenley United Jewish Community	United Synagogue	Shenley	website		
Stevenage Liberal Synagogue	Progressive Judaism	Stevenage	website		
Watford and District Synagogue	United Synagogue	Watford	website		
Welwyn Garden City Hebrew Congregation	United Synagogue	Welwyn Garden City	website		

=== Greater London ===
==== Central London ====
===== Royal Borough of Kensington and Chelsea =====
Name	Affiliation/ritual	Location	Web	Ref	Images
Beit Klal Yisrael	Progressive Judaism	North Kensington, London W1	website		
Chelsea Synagogue	United Synagogue	Chelsea, London SW3	website		
Holland Park Synagogue	S&P Sephardi Community	Kensington, London, W11	website		

===== City of Westminster =====
Name	Affiliation/ritual	Location	Web	Ref	Images
Anshei Shalom	Independent Sephardi Orthodox	St John's Wood	website		
Central Synagogue London	United Synagogue	London W1	website		
Lauderdale Road Spanish & Portuguese Synagogue	S&P Sephardi Community	Maida Vale	website		
The Liberal Jewish Synagogue	Progressive Judaism	St John's Wood	website		
New London Synagogue	Masorti Judaism	St John's Wood	website		
New West End Synagogue	United Synagogue	Bayswater, London W2	website		
St John's Wood Synagogue	United Synagogue	St John's Wood	website		
West London Synagogue	(Independent) Reform Judaism	London W1	website		The synagogue, shown from the junction of Hampden Gurney Street and Upper Berkeley Street
Western Marble Arch Synagogue	United Synagogue	London W1	website		
Westminster Synagogue	(Independent) Reform Judaism	Knightsbridge, London SW7	website		

==== City of London and the East End ====
===== City of London =====
Name	Affiliation/ritual	Location	Web	Ref	Images
Bevis Marks Synagogue	S&P Sephardi Community	City of London, London EC3	website		

===== London Borough of Tower Hamlets =====
Name	Affiliation/ritual	Location	Web	Ref	Images
Congregation of Jacob Synagogue (Kehillas Ya'akov)	Independent, but with affiliations to Kehillas Federation	Stepney, London E1	website		
Sandys Row Synagogue	Unaffiliated Ashkenazi Orthodox	Spitalfields, London E1	website		

==== East and North East London ====
===== London Borough of Hackney =====
Name	Affiliation/ritual	Location	Web	Ref	Images	Notes
Adath Yisroel Synagogue	Union of Orthodox Hebrew Congregations	Stoke Newington				
Belz Marcuzi	Ashkenazi Orthodox / Strictly Orthodox	Stamford Hill				
Biala Shul	Ashkenazi Orthodox / Strictly Orthodox	Stamford Hill				
Clapton Federation Synagogue (Sha'are Shomayim)	Kehillas Federation	Upper Clapton	website			
Kehillah North London	Progressive Judaism	Stoke Newington	website			
New Stoke Newington Shul	Masorti Judaism	Stoke Newington	website			
Pinters Shul	Ashkenazi Orthodox / Strictly Orthodox	Stamford Hill				
Satmar Shul	Ashkenazi Orthodox / Strictly Orthodox	Stamford Hill				
Springfield Synagogue	Kehillas Federation	Upper Clapton	website			
Tora Eitz Chaim Beth Hamedrash	Ashkenazi Orthodox	Stamford Hill				
Yeshiva Horomoh Beth Hamedrash	Union of Orthodox Hebrew Congregations	Stamford Hill				

===== London Borough of Redbridge =====
Name	Affiliation/ritual	Location	Web	Ref	Images
Cranbrook United Synagogue	United Synagogue	Cranbrook, Ilford	website		
East London & Essex Liberal Synagogue	Progressive Judaism	South Woodford	website		
Ilford Federation Synagogue	Kehillas Federation	Ilford	website		
New Essex Masorti Synagogue	Masorti Judaism	Ilford	website		
Oaks Lane Reform Synagogue	Progressive Judaism	Newbury Park, Ilford	website		

===== London Borough of Waltham Forest =====
Name	Affiliation/ritual	Location	Web	Ref	Images
Highams Park & Chingford Synagogue	United Synagogue	Chingford	website		
Leytonstone and Wanstead Synagogue	Kehillas Federation	Leytonstone	website		
Sukkat Shalom Reform Synagogue	Progressive Judaism	Wanstead			
Woodford Forest United Synagogue	United Synagogue	South Woodford	website		

==== North and North West London ====
===== London Borough of Barnet =====
Name	Affiliation/ritual	Web	Ref	Images
Grassroots Jews		website		
Ohel Mo'ed Community	Masorti Judaism	website		

====== Colindale ======
Name	Affiliation/ritual	Web	Ref	Images
Beis Yaakov Primary School	Orthodox	website		

====== Edgware ======
Name	Affiliation/ritual	Web	Ref	Images
Edgware & Hendon Reform Synagogue	Progressive Judaism	website		
Kol Nefesh Masorti Synagogue	Masorti Judaism	website		
Lubavitch of Edgware	Chabad	website		
Machzikei Hadas Edgware	Strictly Orthodox			
Menorah Foundation School	Modern Orthodox	website		
Menorah Grammar School	Modern Orthodox	website		
Rosh Pinah Primary School	Orthodox Judaism	website		
Yeshurun Synagogue	Kehillas Federation			

====== Edgware and Borehamwood ======
Name	Affiliation/ritual	Web	Ref	Images
South Herts and Edgware Masorti (SHEMA)	Masorti Judaism	website		

====== Finchley ======
Name	Affiliation/ritual	Web	Ref	Images
Akiva School (primary school)	Progressive Judaism	website		
Finchley Central Synagogue ("Finchley Fed")	Kehillas Federation	website		
Finchley Progressive Synagogue	Progressive Judaism	website		
Finchley Reform Synagogue	Progressive Judaism	website		
Finchley United Synagogue (Kinloss Synagogue)	United Synagogue	website		
Leo Baeck College		website		
New North London Synagogue	Masorti Judaism	website		
Pardes House Grammar School	Ashkenazi Orthodox / Strictly Orthodox	website		
Sacks Morasha Jewish Primary School	Orthodox Judaism	website		
Woodside Park Synagogue	United Synagogue	website		

====== Golders Green ======
Name	Affiliation/ritual	Web	Ref	Images
Beis Shmuel Shul (Halpern)	Strictly Orthodox			
Golders Green Beth Hamedrash (Munk's Synagogue)	Independent Ashkenazi Orthodox	website		
Golders Green Synagogue	United Synagogue	website		
Hagers Shul – Beis Yesochor Dov	Strictly Orthodox			
Heichal Menahem Chabad-Lubavitch Shul	Chabad	website		
Machzike Hadath	Kehillas Federation	website		
Menorah Primary School for Boys	Modern Orthodox	website		
Menorah Primary School for Girls	Modern Orthodox	website		
Ohel David Eastern Synagogue	Sephardi Orthodox	website		

====== Hampstead Garden Suburb ======
Name	Affiliation/ritual	Web	Ref	Images
Hampstead Garden Suburb Synagogue	United Synagogue	website		

====== Hendon ======
Name	Affiliation/ritual	Web	Ref	Images
Alei Tzion	United Synagogue	website		
Beis Gavriel	Kehillas Federation	website		
Darchei Avot Synagogue	Sephardi Orthodox			
Hasmonean High School for Boys	Orthodox Judaism	website		
Hasmonean High School for Girls	Orthodox Judaism	website		
Hasmonean Primary School	Orthodox Judaism	website		
Hendon Adath Yisroel	Strictly Orthodox	website		
Hendon Beis Hamedrash	Ashkenazi Orthodox	website		
Hendon United Synagogue (Raleigh Close)	United Synagogue	Facebook page		
Judith Lady Montefiore College	Orthodox Judaism	website		
Kehillas Toras Chaim	Ashkenazi Orthodox	website		
Magen Avot	United Synagogue	website		
Ner Yisrael	Independent Modern Orthodox	website		
Nishmas Yisroel	Kehillas Federation	website		
North Hendon Adath Yisrael Synagogue	Ashkenazi Orthodox	website		
Porat Yosef Synagogue and Community Centre	Sephardi Orthodox (Moroccan)	Hendon	website	

====== Mill Hill ======
Name	Affiliation/ritual	Web	Ref	Images
Etz Chaim Jewish Primary School	Modern Orthodox Judaism	website		
Mill Hill East Jewish Community	United Synagogue	website		
Mill Hill United Synagogue	United Synagogue	website		

====== New Barnet ======
Name	Affiliation/ritual	Web	Ref	Images
Barnet Synagogue	United Synagogue	website		
Jewish Community Secondary School (JCoSS)		website		

====== Temple Fortune ======
Name	Affiliation/ritual	Web	Ref	Images
Alyth (North Western Reform Synagogue)	Progressive Judaism	website		

====== Wembley ======
Name	Affiliation/ritual	Web	Ref	Images
David Ishag Synagogue (Neveh Shalom)	Independent Sephardi Orthodox	website		

====== West Hampstead ======
Name	Affiliation/ritual	Web	Ref	Images
Hampstead Synagogue	Ashkenazi Orthodox	website		
Shomrei Hadath Synagogue	Kehillas Federation	website		

====== Whetstone ======
Name	Affiliation/ritual	Web	Ref	Images
New Whetstone Synagogue	Masorti Judaism	website		
Sha'arei Tsedek: North London Reform Synagogue	Progressive Judaism	website		The synagogue in 2017

===== London Borough of Brent =====
Name	Affiliation/ritual	Location	Web	Ref	Images
Brondesbury Park Synagogue	United Synagogue	Brondesbury Park	website		
JFS (secondary school)	United Synagogue	Kenton	website		
Kenton United Synagogue	United Synagogue	Kenton	website		
Kingsbury United Synagogue	United Synagogue	Kingsbury	website		
Menorah High School for Girls	Modern Orthodox	Neasden			
Michael Sobell Sinai School	Modern Orthodox	Kenton	website		
Stanmore and Canons Park Synagogue	United Synagogue	Stanmore	website		
Wembley United Synagogue	United Synagogue	Wembley	website		
Wembley Synagogue (S&P Sephardic Community)	S&P Sephardi Community	Wembley	website		

===== London Borough of Camden =====
Name	Affiliation/ritual	Location	Web	Ref	Images
Belsize Square Synagogue	Independent (worship in the tradition of German Liberal Judaism)	Belsize Park	website		
Chabad Lubavitch of West Hampstead	Chabad	West Hampstead	website		
South Hampstead Synagogue	United Synagogue	Belsize Park	website		

===== London Borough of Enfield =====
Name	Affiliation/ritual	Location	Web	Ref	Images
Cockfosters and N Southgate Synagogue	United Synagogue	Southgate	website		
Hadley Wood Jewish Community	United Synagogue	Enfield	website		
Ohel Devorah Adeni Synagogue		Southgate			
Palmers Green & Southgate Synagogue	United Synagogue	Palmers Green	website		
Southgate Progressive Synagogue	Progressive Judaism	Oakwood	website		
Wolfenson Hillel Primary School	United Synagogue	Southgate	website		

===== London Borough of Haringey =====
Name	Affiliation/ritual	Location	Web	Ref	Images
Crouch End Chavurah	Progressive Judaism	Crouch End	website		
Muswell Hill Synagogue	United Synagogue	Muswell Hill	website		

===== London Borough of Harrow =====
Name	Affiliation/ritual	Location	Web	Ref	Images
Belmont Synagogue	Ashkenazi Orthodox	Belmont, Stanmore	website		
Kol Chai Hatch End Reform Jewish Community	Progressive Judaism	Hatch End, Pinner	website		
Mosaic Liberal Synagogue	Progressive Judaism	Stanmore	website		
Mosaic Masorti Synagogue	Masorti Judaism	Stanmore	website		
Mosaic Reform Synagogue	Progressive Judaism	Stanmore	website		
Pinner Synagogue	United Synagogue	Pinner	website		

===== London Borough of Hillingdon =====
Name	Affiliation/ritual	Location	Web	Ref	Images
The Ark Synagogue	Progressive Judaism	Northwood	website		
Northwood and Ruislip United Synagogue	United Synagogue	Northwood and Ruislip	website		

===== London Borough of Islington =====
Name	Affiliation/ritual	Location	Web	Ref	Images
Chabad Lubavitch Islington	Chabad	Islington	website		

==== South and South East London ====
===== London Borough of Bromley =====
Name	Affiliation/ritual	Location	Web	Ref	Images
Bromley Reform Synagogue	Progressive Judaism	Bromley	website		

===== London Borough of Croydon =====
Name	Affiliation/ritual	Location	Web	Ref	Images
Croydon Synagogue	Kehillas Federation	Croydon	website		

===== London Borough of Lambeth =====
Name	Affiliation/ritual	Location	Web	Ref	Images
South London Liberal Synagogue	Progressive Judaism	Streatham	website		

===== London Borough of Lewisham =====
Name	Affiliation/ritual	Location	Web	Ref	Images
Catford and Bromley United Synagogue	United Synagogue	Catford	website		

===== London Borough of Sutton =====
Name	Affiliation/ritual	Location	Web	Ref	Images
Sutton & District United Synagogue	United Synagogue	Sutton	website		

==== West and South West London ====
===== London Borough of Ealing =====
Name	Affiliation/ritual	Location	Web	Ref	Images
Ealing (United) Synagogue	United Synagogue	Ealing	website		
Ealing Liberal Synagogue	Progressive Judaism	Ealing	website		

===== Royal Borough of Kingston =====
Name	Affiliation/ritual	Location	Web	Ref	Images
Kingston, Surbiton & District Synagogue	United Synagogue	Kingston upon Thames	website		

===== London Borough of Merton =====
Name	Affiliation/ritual	Location	Web	Ref	Images
Chabad South London – Students and Young Professionals	Chabad	Wimbledon	website		
Chabad Wimbledon	Chabad	Wimbledon	website		

===== London Borough of Richmond =====
Name	Affiliation/ritual	Location	Web	Ref	Images
Richmond Synagogue	United Synagogue	Richmond	website		

===== London Borough of Wandsworth =====
Name	Affiliation/ritual	Location	Web	Ref	Images
The Wimbledon Synagogue	Progressive Judaism	Putney/ Wimbledon	website		Wimbledon Synagogue

=== South East England ===
Name	Affiliation/ritual	Location	Web	Ref	Images
South Bucks Jewish Community	Progressive Judaism	Amersham	website		
Bedfordshire Progressive Synagogue (Rodef Shalom)	Progressive Judaism	Bedfordshire	website		
Isle of Wight Jewish Society	Progressive Judaism	Isle of Wight	website		
Luton United Synagogue	United Synagogue	Luton	website		
Maidenhead Synagogue	Progressive Judaism	Maidenhead	website		
Milton Keynes & District Reform Synagogue	Progressive Judaism	Milton Keynes	website		
Chabad Jewish Centre of Milton Keynes	Chabad	Milton Keynes	website		
Oxford Chabad Society – Oxford Jewish Student Centre	Chabad	Oxford	website		
Oxford Jewish Congregation		Oxford	website		
Oxford Masorti Group	Masorti Judaism	Oxford	website		
South Hampshire Reform Jewish Community	Progressive Judaism	Portsmouth, Southampton and Winchester	website		
Reading Hebrew Congregation	Ashkenazi Orthodox	Reading	website		
Reading Liberal Jewish Community	Progressive Judaism	Reading	website		
Jewish Community of Berkshire	Independent Ashkenazi Orthodox	Reading	website		
Portsmouth and Southsea Synagogue	Ashkenazi Orthodox	Southsea	website		

==== Kent ====
Name	Affiliation/ritual	Location	Web	Ref	Images
Jewish Kent		Kent	website		
Canterbury Jewish Community		Canterbury	website		
Kent Liberal Jewish Community – Ohel Rachel	Progressive Judaism	Maidstone	website		
Thanet & District Reform Synagogue	Progressive Judaism	Ramsgate	website		
Chatham Memorial Synagogue, Rochester	Ashkenazi Orthodox	Rochester	website		

==== Surrey ====
Name	Affiliation/ritual	Location	Web	Ref	Images
Kingston Liberal Synagogue	Progressive Judaism	Long Ditton	website		
North West Surrey Synagogue	Progressive Judaism	Weybridge	website		
Staines and District Synagogue	United Synagogue	Staines-upon-Thames	website		

==== Sussex ====
Name	Affiliation/ritual	Location	Web	Ref	Images
Bognor Regis and District Hebrew Congregation	Ashkenazi Orthodox	Bognor Regis	website		
Brighton & Hove Hebrew Congregation: West Hove Synagogue	Ashkenazi Orthodox	Hove	website		
Brighton & Hove Hebrew Congregation: Middle Street Synagogue	Ashkenazi Orthodox	Brighton	website		
Brighton and Hove Progressive Synagogue	Progressive Judaism	Hove	website		Brighton and Hove Progressive Synagogue
Brighton and Hove Reform Synagogue	Progressive Judaism	Hove	website		Brighton and Hove Reform Synagogue
Chabad Lubavitch of Brighton	Chabad	Brighton	website		
Chabad Lubavitch at S E Coast Universities	Chabad	Brighton	website		
Crawley Jewish Community	Progressive Judaism	Crawley			
Eastbourne Hebrew Congregation	Ashkenazi Orthodox	Eastbourne	website		
Eastbourne Liberal Jewish Community	Progressive Judaism	Eastbourne	website		
Hastings and District Jewish Society	Progressive Judaism, but unaffiliated	Hastings	website		

=== South West England ===
Name	Affiliation/ritual	Location	Web	Ref	Images
Bournemouth Chavurah	Masorti Judaism	Bournemouth	website		
Bournemouth Community Hebrew Congregation	Ashkenazi Orthodox	Bournemouth	website		Bournemouth Hebrew Congregation's synagogue
Bournemouth Reform Synagogue	Progressive Judaism	Bournemouth	website		Bournemouth Reform Synagogue
Chabad of Bournemouth	Chabad	Bournemouth	website		
Wessex Liberal Jewish Community	Progressive Judaism	Bournemouth	website		
Bristol and West Progressive Jewish Congregation	Progressive Judaism	Bristol	website		|
Chabad of Bristol	Chabad	Bristol	website		
Park Row Synagogue (Bristol Hebrew Congregation)	Ashkenazi Orthodox	Bristol	website		
Cheltenham Synagogue	Ashkenazi Orthodox	Cheltenham	website		The front of the Cheltenham Synagogue
Kehillat Kernow (The Jewish Community of Cornwall)	Progressive Judaism	Cornwall	website		
Exeter Synagogue	Unaffiliated: ritual varies	Exeter	website		Painting of Exeter Synagogue interior, 1881
Plymouth Synagogue	Ashkenazi Orthodox	Plymouth	website		Plymouth Synagogue
Swindon Jewish Community	Progressive Judaism	Swindon			
Three Counties Liberal Jewish Community	Progressive Judaism	Gloucestershire, Herefordshire and Worcestershire	website		
Totnes Reform Jewish Group	Progressive Judaism	Totnes	website		

=== West Midlands ===
Name	Affiliation/ritual	Location	Web	Ref	Images
Birmingham Central Synagogue	United Synagogue	Edgbaston, Birmingham	website		Interior view from the top
Birmingham Hebrew Congregation (Singers Hill Synagogue)	Ashkenazi Orthodox	Birmingham	website		Singers Hill Synagogue
Birmingham Progressive Synagogue	Progressive Judaism	Birmingham	website		
Chabad Jewish Student Centre of Birmingham	Chabad	Birmingham	website		
King David School, Birmingham		Birmingham	website		
Coventry Jewish Reform Community	Progressive Judaism	Coventry	website		
Solihull Shul (Solihull & District Hebrew Congregation)	Ashkenazi Orthodox	Solihull	website		
Stoke-on-Trent and North Staffordshire; Hebrew Congregation	Ashkenazi Orthodox	Newcastle-under-Lyme, Staffordshire	website		

=== Yorkshire ===
Name	Affiliation/ritual	Location	Web	Ref	Images	Notes
Bradford Synagogue	Progressive Judaism	Bradford	website		Bradford Synagogue	
Harrogate Hebrew Congregation	Ashkenazi Orthodox	Harrogate	website			
Huddersfield and District Jewish Community	Non-denominational	Huddersfield, Dewsbury, Holmfirth and area				See History of the Huddersfield community
Hull Hebrew Congregation	Ashkenazi Orthodox	Hull	website			See History of the Jews in Hull
Hull Reform Synagogue (Ne've Shalom)	Progressive Judaism	Willerby	website		Hull Reform Synagogue (Ne've Shalom)	
Sheffield & District Reform Jewish Congregation (Seven Hills Shul)	Progressive Judaism	Sheffield	website			
Todmorden & Calder Valley Jewish Community	Non-denominational	Calderdale				Regarded as a successor of the Calderdale Jewish Community Centre, which ceased to exist in the early 2020s
United Synagogue Sheffield (Kingfield Synagogue)	United Synagogue	Sheffield	website			
York Liberal Jewish Community	Progressive Judaism	York	website			

==== Leeds ====
Name	Affiliation/ritual	Location	Web	Ref	Images
Beth Hamidrash Hagadol Synagogue	Ashkenazi Orthodox	Moortown, Leeds	website		Beth Hamidrash Hagadol Synagogue
Chabad Lubavitch at Leeds Campus	Chabad	Leeds	website		
Chabad Lubavitch Leeds	Chabad	Leeds	website		
Etz Chaim Synagogue	Ashkenazi Orthodox	Leeds	website		Etz Chaim Synagogue, with Moortown Water Tower behind
Leeds Masorti Community	Masorti Judaism	Leeds	website		
Sinai Synagogue	Progressive Judaism	Roundhay, Leeds	website		Sinai Synagogue
United Hebrew Congregation, Shadwell Lane, Leeds	Ashkenazi Orthodox	Moortown, Leeds	website		

=== North West England ===
Name	Affiliation/ritual	Location	Web	Ref	Images
Chester Hebrew Congregation	Ashkenazi	Chester	website		
Lancashire & Cumbria Liberal Jewish Community	Progressive Judaism	Lancashire and Cumbria	website		
Lancaster & Lakes Jewish Community	Non-denominational	Lancaster	website		

==== Blackpool and Lytham St Annes ====
Name	Affiliation/ritual	Location	Web	Ref	Images
Blackpool Reform Jewish Congregation	Progressive Judaism	Blackpool	website		Blackpool Reform Synagogue
St. Annes Hebrew Congregation	Unaffiliated Ashkenazi Orthodox	Lytham St Annes	website		

==== Liverpool ====
Name	Affiliation/ritual	Location	Web	Ref	Images
Allerton Hebrew Congregation	Ashkenazi Orthodox	Allerton	website		
Chabad of Liverpool Universities	Chabad	Liverpool	website		
Childwall Hebrew Congregation	Ashkenazi Orthodox	Childwall			
King David High School		Wavertree	website		
King David Primary School		Liverpool	website		
Liverpool Masorti Community	Masorti Judaism	Liverpool	website		
Liverpool Old Hebrew Congregation (Princes Road Synagogue)	United Synagogue	Toxteth	website		The synagaogue's nave
Liverpool Reform Synagogue	Progressive Judaism	Wavertree	website		

==== Greater Manchester ====
===== Metropolitan Borough of Bury =====
Name	Affiliation/ritual	Location	Web	Ref	Images
Bury Hebrew Congregation	Ashkenazi Orthodox	Bury	website		Beis Hamedrash at Bury Hebrew Congregation
Damesek Eliezer Synagogue (Prestwich Beth Hamedrash)	Ashkenazi Orthodox	Prestwich			
Higher Prestwich Hebrew Congregation	Ashkenazi Orthodox	Prestwich			
Hillock Hebrew Congregation	Ashkenazi Orthodox	Whitefield			
Holy Law Hebrew South Broughton Congregation	Ashkenazi Orthodox	Prestwich	website		
Kehilas Kol Yaakov	Kehillas Federation	Prestwich	website		
Meade Hill Shul (United Synagogue, Manchester)	United Synagogue	Prestwich	website		
Sedgley Park Synagogue (Shomrei Hadass)	Ashkenazi Orthodox	Prestwich			
Sha'arei Shalom	Progressive Judaism	Whitefield	website		
Whitefield Hebrew Congregation	Ashkenazi Orthodox	Whitefield	website		

===== City of Manchester =====
Name	Affiliation/ritual	Location	Web	Ref	Images
Bowdon Shul (South Manchester Synagogue)	Ashkenazi Orthodox	Bowdon	website		
Chabad Lubavitch South Manchester	Chabad	Bowdon	website		
King David High School, Manchester		Manchester	website		King David School, Manchester
Heaton Park Hebrew Congregation	Ashkenazi Orthodox	Higher Crumpsall	website		
Manchester Liberal Jewish Community	Progressive Judaism	Manchester	website		
Manchester Reform Synagogue	Progressive Judaism	Manchester	website		
Menorah Synagogue: Cheshire Reform Congregation	Progressive Judaism	Sharston, Wythenshawe, Manchester	website		

===== City of Salford =====
Name	Affiliation/ritual	Location	Web	Ref	Images
Cheetham Hebrew Congregation	Ashkenazi Orthodox	Salford	website		
L'chaim Chabad-Lubavitch	Chabad	Salford	website		
Machzikei Hadass Synagogue	Ashkenazi Orthodox	Higher Broughton, Salford			
Ohr Yerushalayim	Kehillas Federation	Salford	website		
Talmud Torah Chinuch N'orim Synagogue	Union of Orthodox Hebrew Congregations	Salford			

===== Metropolitan Borough of Stockport =====
Name	Affiliation/ritual	Location	Web	Ref	Images
Chabad of Cheadle	Chabad	Cheadle	website		

===== Metropolitan Borough of Trafford =====
Name	Affiliation/ritual	Location	Web	Ref	Images
Hale Shule (Hale & District Hebrew Congregation)	Ashkenazi Orthodox	Hale Barns, Altrincham	website		
Shaare Hayim	Sephardi	Hale Barns, Altrincham	website		
Yeshurun Hebrew Congregation	Ashkenazi Orthodox	Gatley	website		

==== Southport ====
Name	Affiliation/ritual	Location	Web	Ref	Images
Southport Hebrew Congregation (Arnside Road)	United Synagogue	Southport, Sefton, Merseyside	website		
Southport & District Reform Synagogue	Progressive Judaism	Southport	website		

=== North East England ===
Name	Affiliation/ritual	Location	Web	Ref	Images
Darlington Hebrew Congregation	Progressive Judaism	Darlington, County Durham	website		
Durham & NE Liberal Jewish Community	Progressive Judaism	Durham	website		
Gateshead Hebrew Congregation	Haredi Judaism	Gateshead, Tyne and Wear			
Gateshead Jewish Academy for Girls	Haredi Judaism	Gateshead			
Gateshead Talmudical College (Gateshead Yeshiva)	Haredi Judaism	Gateshead	website		
Gateshead Kolel	Haredi Judaism	Gateshead	website		
Newcastle Reform Synagogue	Progressive Judaism	Gosforth, Newcastle upon Tyne	website		
Newcastle United Hebrew Congregation	Ashkenazi Orthodox	Gosforth, Newcastle upon Tyne	website		
Representative Council of North East Jewry	N/A	Northumberland, Tyne and Wear, Durham and Cleveland	website		
Sunderland Talmudical College (Sunderland Yeshiva)	Haredi Judaism	Gateshead			

== Scotland ==
There have been Jews in Scotland since the 17th century, if not earlier. Most Scottish Jews today are of Ashkenazi background who mainly settled in Edinburgh, then in Glasgow in the mid-19th century. According to the 2011 UK census, 5,887 Jews lived in Scotland; a decline of 8.7% from the 2001 census. The total population of Scotland at the time was 5,313,600, making Scottish Jews 0.1% of the population.

Name	Affiliation/ritual	Location	Web	Ref	Images
Jewish Council of Scotland	N/A		website		

=== Edinburgh ===
Name	Affiliation/ritual	Location	Web	Ref	Images
Chabad Jewish Community of Edinburgh	Chabad	Edinburgh	website		
Edinburgh Hebrew Congregation	Ashkenazi Orthodox	Edinburgh	website		Edinburgh Synagogue
Sukkat Shalom, Edinburgh Liberal Jewish Community	Progressive Judaism	Edinburgh	website		

=== Greater Glasgow ===
Name	Affiliation/ritual	Location	Web	Ref	Images
Garnethill Synagogue	Ashkenazi Orthodox	Glasgow	website		Garnethill Synagogue
Giffnock Newton Mearns Synagogue (Giffnock Shul)	Ashkenazi Orthodox	Giffnock, East Renfrewshire	website		
Glasgow Jewish Representative Council	N/A	Glasgow	website		
Glasgow Reform Synagogue	Progressive Judaism	Newton Mearns, East Renfrewshire	website		

=== Elsewhere ===
Name	Affiliation/ritual	Location	Web	Ref	Images
Aberdeen Synagogue and Jewish Community Centre	Ashkenazi Orthodox	Aberdeen	website		
Tayside and Fife Jewish Community	Unaffiliated	St Andrews, Fife	website		

== Wales ==
There are records of Jews in Abergavenny, Caerleon and Chepstow in the 13th century, all of them in the Marcher lordships of South Wales. However, after the English conquest of Wales (1287–1283), Edward I issued the 1290 Edict of Expulsion expelling the Jews from England. It is likely that most, if not all, Jews left Wales after this edict.

A Jewish community was recorded in Swansea in around 1730. Further Jewish communities were formed in the 19th century in Cardiff, Merthyr Tydfil, Pontypridd and Tredegar." Jewish communities in Wales were augmented by refugees from Nazi-dominated Europe in the late 1930s.

The modern community in South Wales is centred on the Cardiff Reform Synagogue and the Cardiff United Synagogue. There is also a synagogue in Swansea. The synagogue of Merthyr Tydfil, the major one north of Cardiff, ceased to hold regular services in the 1970s and the building was later sold.

Name	Affiliation/ritual	Location	Web	Ref	Images
Cardiff Reform Synagogue	Progressive Judaism	Cardiff	website		
Cardiff United Synagogue	Ashkenazi Orthodox	Cardiff	website		
Llandudno and Colwyn Bay Hebrew Congregation	Ashkenazi Orthodox	Llandudno	website		
Swansea Hebrew Congregation	Ashkenazi Orthodox	Swansea			
Welshpool Jewish Group	Progressive Judaism	Welshpool	website		

== Northern Ireland ==
The Jews of Northern Ireland have lived primarily in Belfast, where the Belfast Hebrew Congregation, an Ashkenazi Orthodox community, was established in 1870. Services had previously been held at a private home in Holywood, County Down. Former communities were located in Derry and Lurgan. The first reference to Jews in Belfast dates from 1652, and a "Jew butcher" was mentioned in 1771, suggesting some semblance of a Jewish community at that time.

Name	Affiliation/ritual	Location	Web	Ref	Images
Belfast Jewish Community	Ashkenazi Orthodox	Belfast	website		

== See also ==
- Lists
  - List of Orthodox Jewish communities in the United Kingdom
  - List of former synagogues in the United Kingdom
  - List of synagogues in Gibraltar
- History
  - Isle of Man Jewish Community
  - History of the Jews in Guernsey
  - History of the Jews in Jersey
  - History of the Jews in Gibraltar
- Organisations and movements
  - Kehillas Federation
  - Masorti Judaism
  - Progressive Judaism
  - Jewish Council of Scotland
  - Union of Orthodox Hebrew Congregations
  - United Synagogue
