= Blackpool Reform Jewish Congregation =

Reform Judaism congregation in Blackpool, Lancashire, England

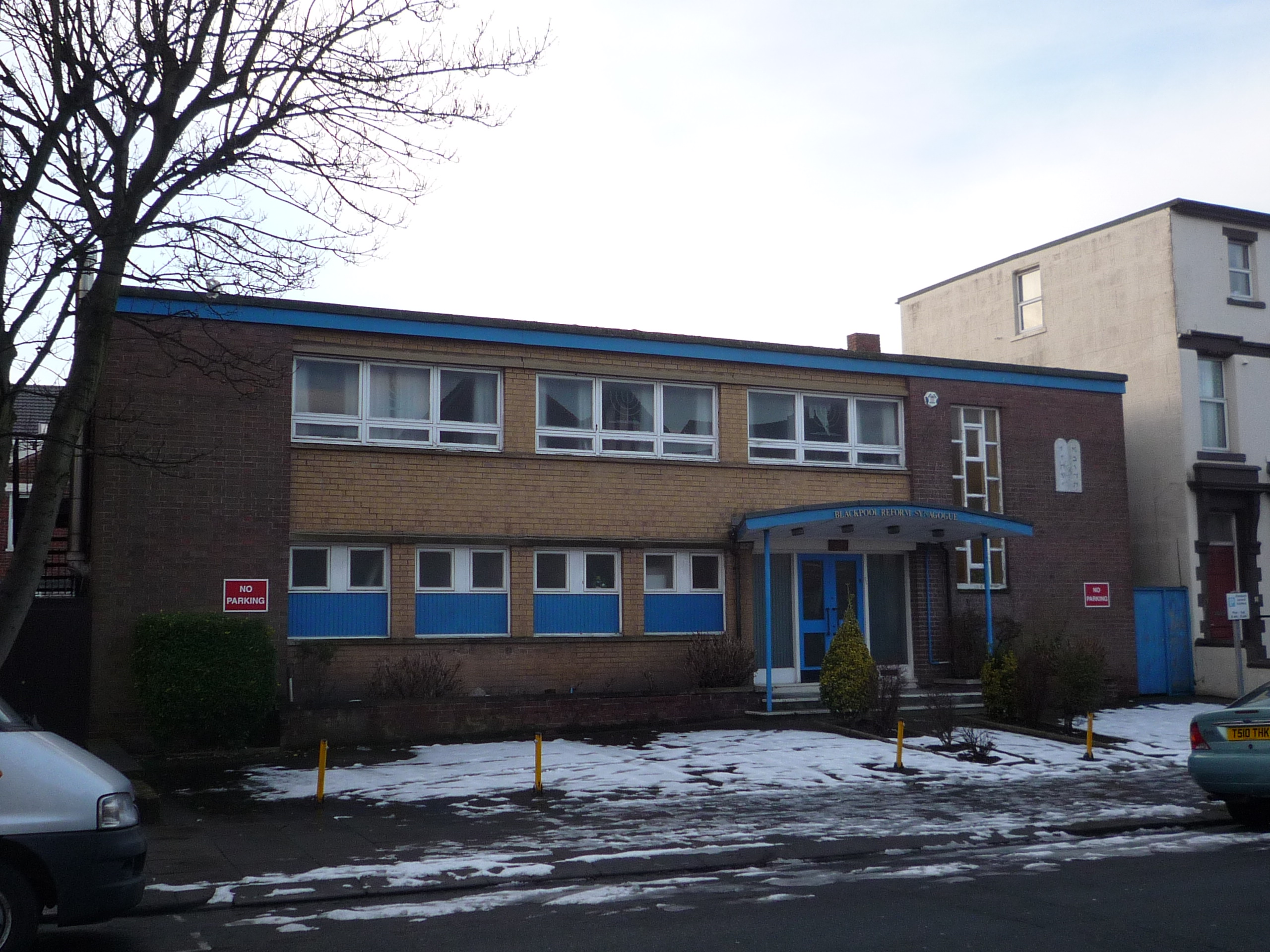
- The synagogue in 2009

- The synagogue in Blackpool

Religion
- Affiliation: Reform Judaism
- Ecclesiastical or organizational status: Synagogue
- Leadership: Rabbi Norman Zalud
- Status: Active

Location
- Location: 40 Raikes Parade, Blackpool, Lancashire, England FY1 4EX
- Country: United Kingdom
- Interactive map of Blackpool Reform Jewish Congregation
- Coordinates: 53°49′01″N 3°02′38″W

Architecture
- Established: 1947 (as a congregation)
- Completed: 1961

Website
- brjc.co.uk

The Blackpool Reform Jewish Congregation is a Reform Jewish congregation and synagogue, located in Blackpool, Lancashire, England, in the United Kingdom.

== History ==
With a synagogue located on Raikes Parade, Blackpool Reform Jewish Congregation was founded in 1947 and was originally a member of the Union of Liberal and Progressive Synagogues. It is now a constituent synagogue of the Movement for Reform Judaism with which it has been associated since 1961.

It is also a member of the Board of Deputies of British Jews, the Jewish Representative Council of Greater Manchester and Region and the Blackpool Faith Forum.

In October 2005 Michael Howard visited the synagogue on the day he gave his final speech as leader of the Conservative Party at its annual Party Conference in Blackpool. He was called up to the Torah during a first day Rosh Hashanah service at the synagogue.

The synagogue publishes a quarterly magazine, Migdal.

== Rabbi ==
Rabbi Norman Zalud is the community's rabbi. He also serves the community of Manchester's Sha'arei Shalom synagogue and, until 2007, was rabbi of the Liverpool Reform Synagogue.

He has worked with the Blackpool Reform community for the last 40 years. He teaches special needs children at Delemere Forest School, is prison chaplain for all faiths in eleven prisons in the north west of England and Jewish chaplain to Southport and District Hospital.

Rabbi Zalud trained as a cantor at Guildhall School of Music and then at Jews' College, where he received a minister's qualification before going to Leo Baeck College. He received semikhah in 1993.

== See also ==
- History of the Jews in England
- List of Jewish communities in the United Kingdom
- List of synagogues in the United Kingdom
