= Central Synagogue =

Central Synagogue may refer to:

== Argentina ==
- Central Synagogue of Buenos Aires

== Australia ==
- Central Synagogue (Sydney)

== Israel ==
- Yeshurun Central Synagogue

== Syria ==
- Central Synagogue of Aleppo

== United Kingdom ==
- Birmingham Central Synagogue
- Central Synagogue (Great Portland Street) (London)
- East London Central Synagogue

== United States ==
- Central Synagogue (Manhattan)
