= Beth Shalom Reform Synagogue (Cambridge) =

Reform synagogue in Cambridge, England

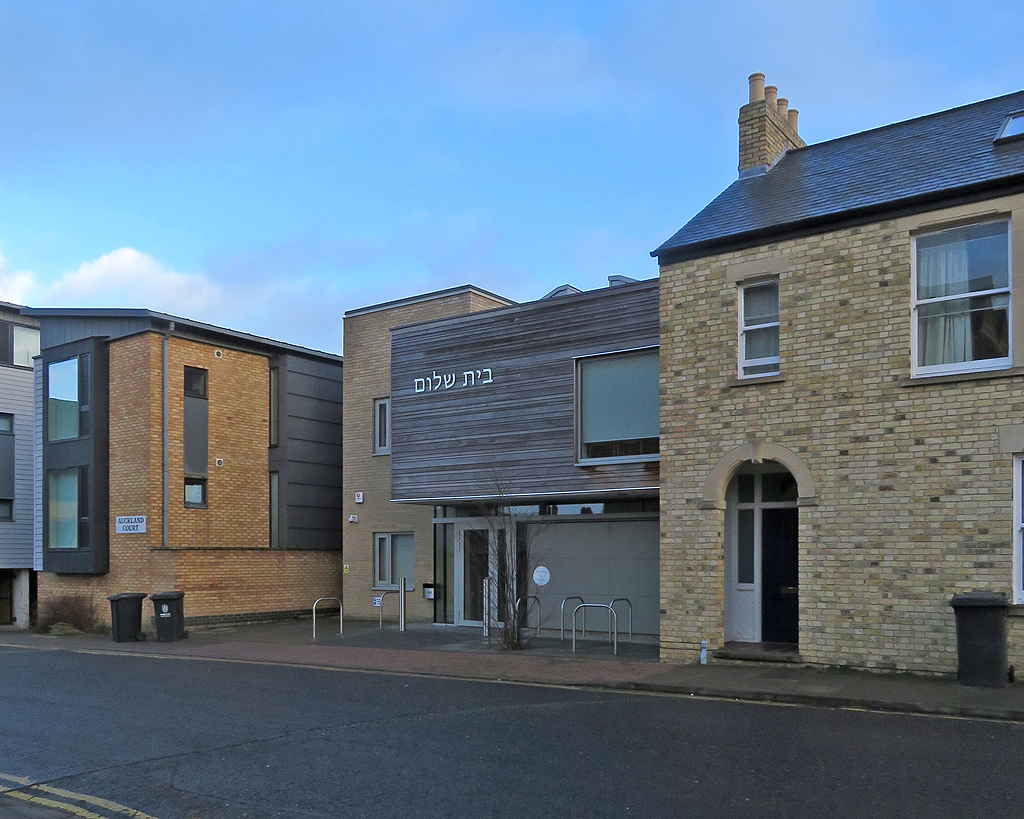
- The synagogue in 2018

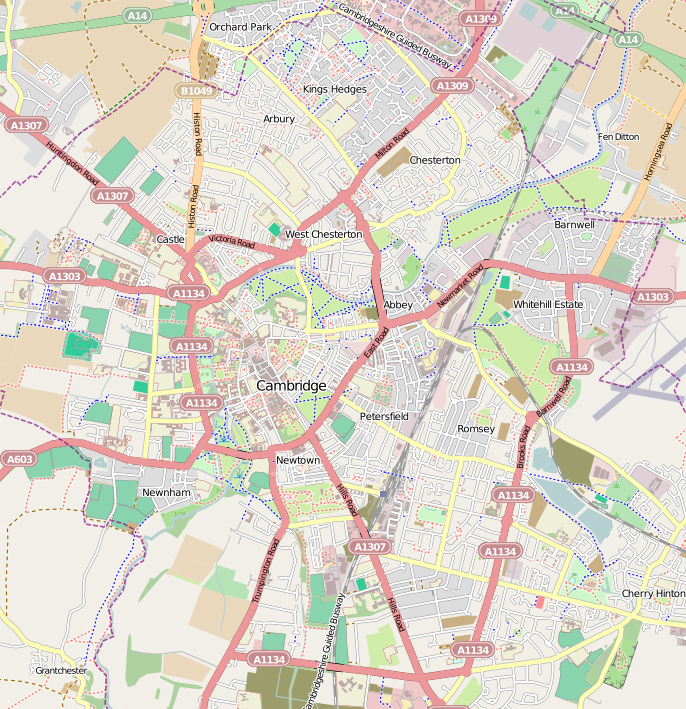
- Location of the synagogue in Cambridge

Religion
- Affiliation: Reform Judaism
- Ecclesiastical or organisational status: Synagogue
- Status: Active

Location
- Location: Auckland Road, Cambridge, England
- Coordinates: 52°12′33″N 0°08′01″E

Architecture
- Established: 1981 (as a congregation)
- Completed: 2015

Website
- beth-shalom.org.uk

Beth Shalom Reform Synagogue is a Reform Jewish congregation and synagogue on Auckland Road, in the City of Cambridge, England, in the United Kingdom.

Beth Shalom Reform Synagogue is a member of the Movement for Reform Judaism.

== History ==
The congregation's forebears commence in October 1976 when the Cambridge Reform Jewish Community was founded. The Beth Shalom congregation was established in 1981.

The congregation initially held services in hired premises until 2015 when the community opened a new synagogue on a site on Auckland Road, the first Reform synagogue in Cambridge. The new building includes a prayer hall for at least 200 people. The building was dedicated on 6 September 2015 at a service addressed by Laura Janner-Klausner, senior rabbi to the Movement for Reform Judaism.

== See also ==
- List of synagogues in the United Kingdom
