= Barnet Synagogue =

Synagogue in London, England, United Kingdom

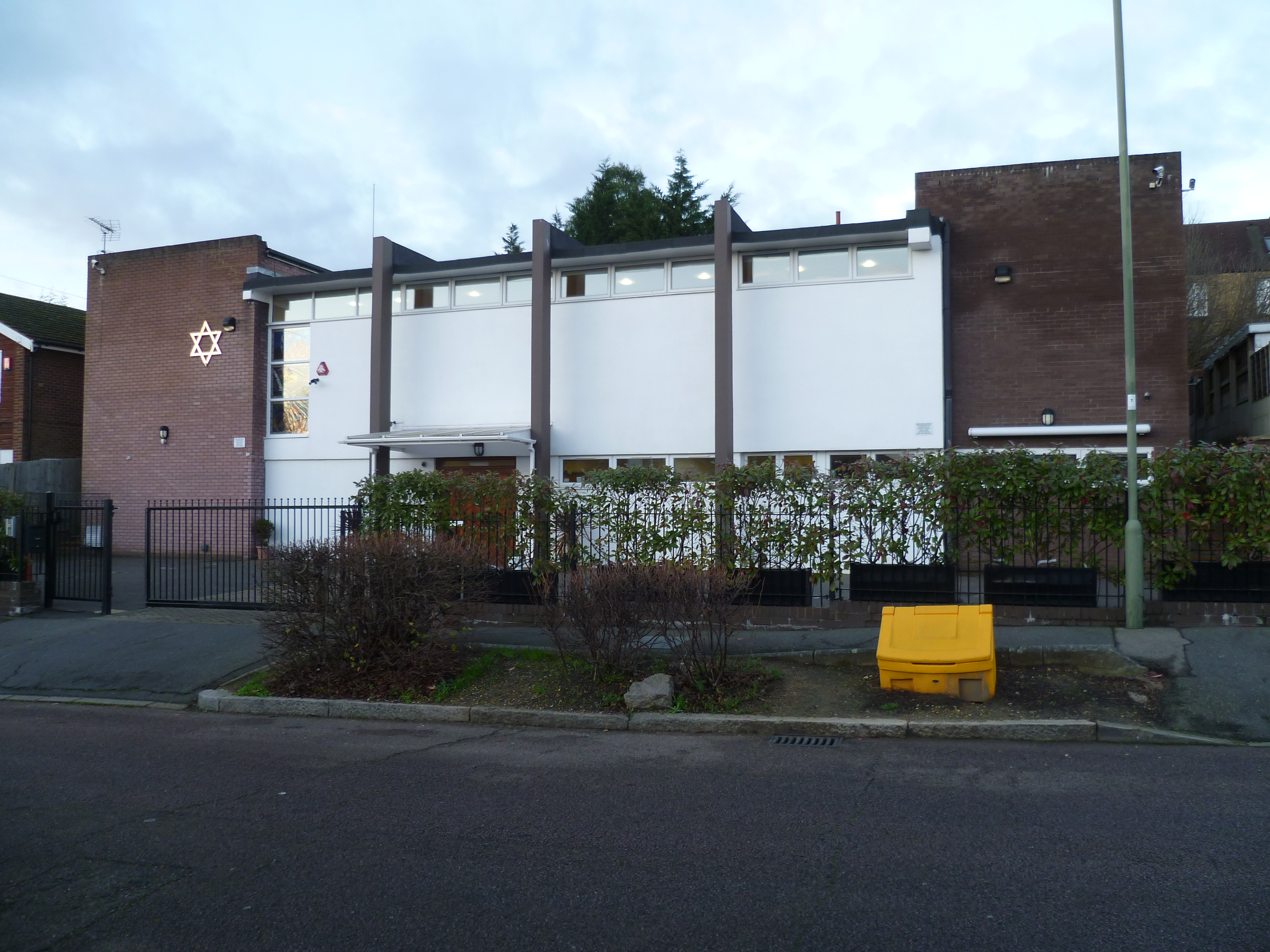
- The synagogue in 2016

- Location of the synagogue in London

Religion
- Affiliation: Orthodox Judaism
- Ecclesiastical or organisational status: Synagogue
- Leadership: Rabbi Moshe Chaim Lister
- Status: Active

Location
- Location: 47 Eversleigh Road, New Barnet, Borough of Barnet, London, England
- Country: United Kingdom
- Coordinates: 51°38′40″N 0°10′32″W

Architecture
- Completed: 1965

Website
- barnetshul.com

The Barnet Synagogue, commonly called the Barnet Shul, is an Orthodox Jewish congregation and synagogue, located in Eversleigh Road, New Barnet, in the Borough of Barnet, London, England, in the United Kingdom.

The Barnet Synagogue congregation is a member of the United Synagogue.

In January 2025, Rabbi Moshe Chaim Lister and Rebbetzen Miri Lister were appointed as the new rabbinic couple to serve the community.

== See also ==
- History of the Jews in England
- List of synagogues in the United Kingdom
