= Southport & District Reform Synagogue =

Reform synagogue in Merseyside, England

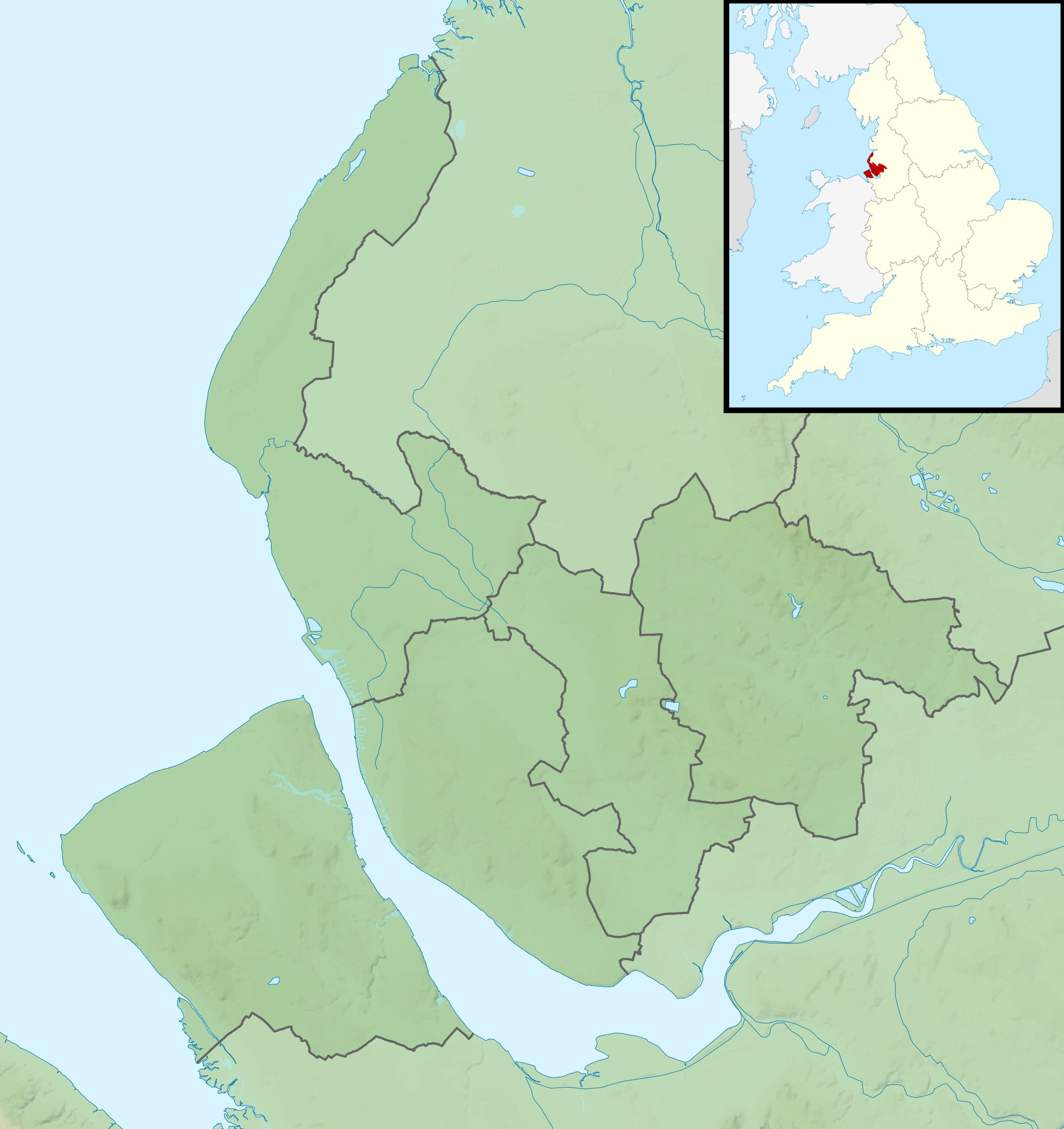
- Location of the synagogue in Merseyside

Religion
- Affiliation: Reform Judaism
- Ecclesiastical or organizational status: Synagogue
- Status: Active

Location
- Location: Princes Street, Southport, Metropolitan Borough of Sefton, Merseyside, England PR8 1EG
- Country: United Kingdom
- Interactive map of Southport & District Reform Synagogue
- Coordinates: 53°38′41″N 3°00′23″W

Architecture
- Established: 1948 (as a congregation)
- Completed: c. 1955 (current building)

Website
- southportreform.org.uk

Southport & District Reform Synagogue, also known as Sha'arei Shalom ("Gates of Peace"), is a Reform Jewish congregation and synagogue, located at the corner of Princes Street and Portland Street, Southport, in the Metropolitan Borough of Sefton, Merseyside, England, in the United Kingdom. Founded in 1948 as Southport New Synagogue, the congregation has been a member of the Movement for Reform Judaism since 1949.

The congregation celebrated its 70th anniversary in 2018. The synagogue publishes a newsletter, L'Chayim.

== See also ==
Logo of the congregation

- History of the Jews in England
- List of Jewish communities in the United Kingdom
- List of synagogues in the United Kingdom
