= Kol Chai Hatch End Reform Jewish Community =

Reform Jewish congregation

- Location of the synagogue in Greater London

Religion
- Affiliation: Reform Judaism
- Ecclesiastical or organizational status: Synagogue
- Leadership: Rabbi Naomi Goldman
- Status: Active

Location
- Location: 434 Uxbridge Road, Hatch End, Pinner, Borough of Harrow, London, England HA5 4RG
- Country: United Kingdom
- Interactive map of Kol Chai; Hatch End Reform Jewish Community
- Coordinates: 51°36′25.95″N 0°22′37.8″W

Architecture
- Established: 1987 (as a congregation)
- Completed: 1992

Website
- kolchai.org

Kol Chai – Hatch End Reform Jewish Community is a Reform Jewish congregation and synagogue, located at 434 Uxbridge Road, Hatch End, Pinner in the Borough of Harrow, London, England, in the United Kingdom. The congregation was founded in March 1987 and is a member of the Movement for Reform Judaism.

The rabbi of the congregation since September 2017 has been Naomi Goldman.

== See also ==
- History of the Jews in England
- List of Jewish communities in the United Kingdom
- List of synagogues in the United Kingdom
