= Milton Keynes & District Reform Synagogue =

Reform synagogue in Buckinghamshire, England

- Location of the synagogue in Southeast England

Religion
- Affiliation: Reform Judaism
- Ecclesiastical or organizational status: Synagogue
- Status: Active

Location
- Location: 1 Hainault Avenue, Giffard Park, Milton Keynes, Buckinghamshire, England MK14 5PQ
- Country: United Kingdom
- Interactive map of Milton Keynes & District Reform Synagogue
- Coordinates: 52°04′22″N 0°44′41″W

Architecture
- Established: 1978 (as a congregation)
- Completed: 2002

Website
- mkdrs.org.uk

The Milton Keynes & District Reform Synagogue, also known as Beit Echud, is a Reform Jewish congregation and synagogue, located in Giffard Park, Milton Keynes, a city in Buckinghamshire, England, in the United Kingdom.

The community was founded in 1978 and is a member of the Movement for Reform Judaism. Its current synagogue building was opened in 2002. The congregation publishes a members' newsletter, Listen.

== See also ==
- History of the Jews in England
- List of Jewish communities in the United Kingdom
- List of synagogues in the United Kingdom
