= Golders Green Beth Hamedrash =

Orthodox Synagogue and community in London

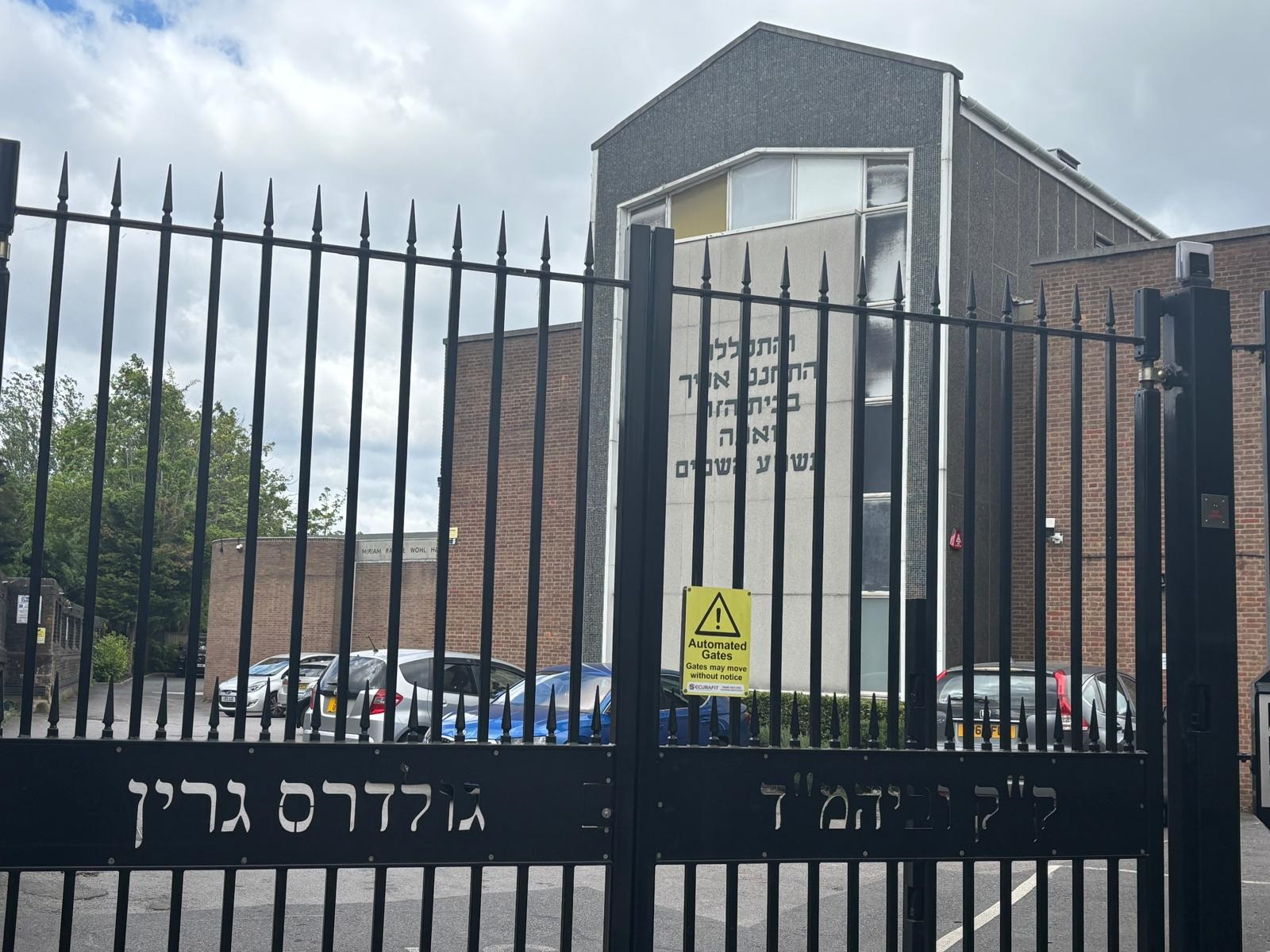

- Location of the synagogue in Greater London

Religion
- Affiliation: Orthodox Judaism
- Rite: Nusach Ashkenaz
- Ecclesiastical or organisational status: Synagogue
- Leadership: Rabbi Yisroel Meir Greenberg
- Status: Active

Location
- Location: 9 The Riding, Golders Green, Borough of Barnet, London, England NW11 8HL
- Country: United Kingdom
- Coordinates: 51°34′25″N 0°12′09″W

Architecture
- Established: 1936 (as a congregation)
- Completed: 1956

Website
- ggbh.info

The Golders Green Beth Hamedrash (popularly known as Munk's or abbreviated as GGBH) is an Orthodox Jewish congregation and synagogue, located in Golders Green, in the Borough of Barnet, London, England, in the United Kingdom. The congregation worships in the Ashkenazi rite, but as opposed to most other "Yekkish" communities, it follows minhag Berlin, which is a form of the Eastern Ashkenazic rite. It is a constituent of the Kedassia kashruth organisation.

== History ==
Most of the founders were refugees from Nazi Germany before and during World War II. It was founded in 1934 in the King Alfred School, and was located for many years in the Lincoln Institute in Broadwalk Lane. It moved to its present location in The Riding in 1956.

The figure that made his mark on the beit midrash between the 1930s and the 1970s was Rabbi Dr. Eliahu Munk (1900–1978), a PhD in English Literature and a representative of the 'Torah im Derech Eretz' school, founded by Rabbi Samson Raphael Hirsch, which combines the study of Torah with earning a livelihood. Rabbi Chaim Feldman served as rabbi from the 1970s until he retired in 2007; he died in 2020. The present rabbi is Rabbi Yisroel Meir Greenberg.

The congregation has also established Menorah Primary School and Menorah High School.

== See also ==
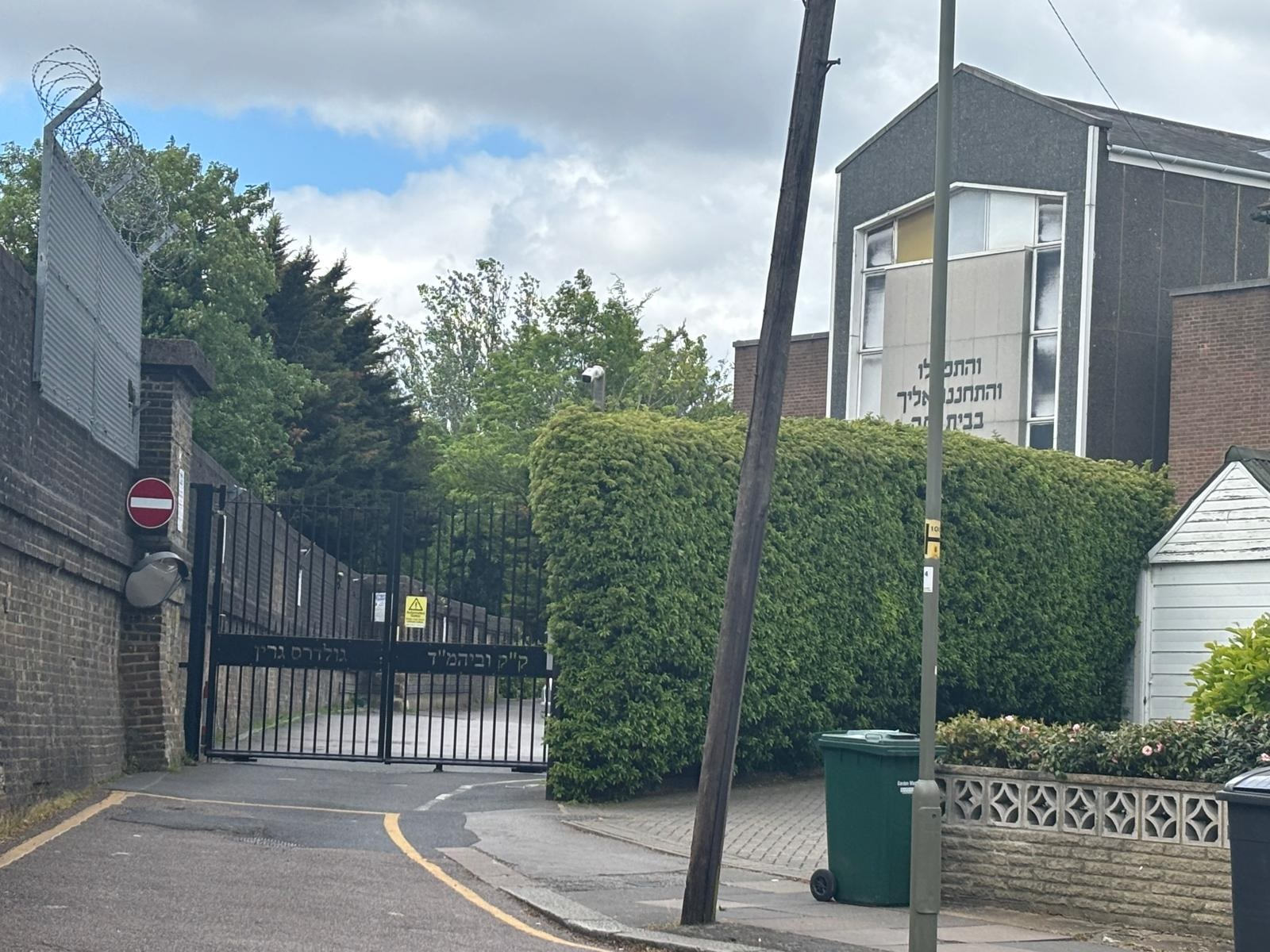
Golders Green Beth Hamedrash

- History of the Jews in England
- List of Jewish communities in the United Kingdom
- List of synagogues in the United Kingdom
