= Peterborough Liberal Jewish Community =

Jewish community in Peterborough, England

Peterborough Synagogue (Peterborough Liberal Jewish Community)

Religion
- Affiliation: Liberal Judaism
- Status: Active

Location
- Location: Peterborough, Cambridgeshire, England, United Kingdom

Website
- pljc.org.uk

The Peterborough Liberal Jewish Community is a Jewish community based in Peterborough, Cambridgeshire, England. It was founded in 1991 and is a constituent member of Liberal Judaism. It holds services on the first Saturday of the month and also on High Holy Days. Its rabbi is Dr Tali Artman Partock.

== See also ==
- List of Jewish communities in the United Kingdom
