= Kol Nefesh Masorti Synagogue =

Masorti synagogue in London, England

- Location of the synagogue in Greater London

Religion
- Affiliation: Conservative Judaism
- Rite: Masorti Judaism
- Ecclesiastical or organizational status: Synagogue
- Leadership: Rabbi Joel Levy (part-time)
- Status: Active

Location
- Location: Rectory Lane, Edgware, Borough of Barnet] , London, England HA8 7LF
- Country: United Kingdom
- Interactive map of Kol Nefesh Masorti Synagogue
- Coordinates: 51°36′50″N 0°16′37″W

Architecture
- Established: 2001 (as a congregation)

Website
- kolnefesh.org.uk

Kol Nefesh Masorti Synagogue is a Masorti Jewish congregation and synagogue, located on Rectory Lane in Edgware, in the Borough of Barnet, London, England, in the United Kingdom. The congregation was founded in 2001. Its part-time rabbi is Joel Levy (Note: Levy also serves as part-time Rosh at The Conservative Yeshiva in Jerusalem.) and its cantor is Jaclyn Chernett.

== See also ==
- History of the Jews in England
- List of Jewish communities in the United Kingdom
- List of synagogues in the United Kingdom
