= Jewish Community of Berkshire =

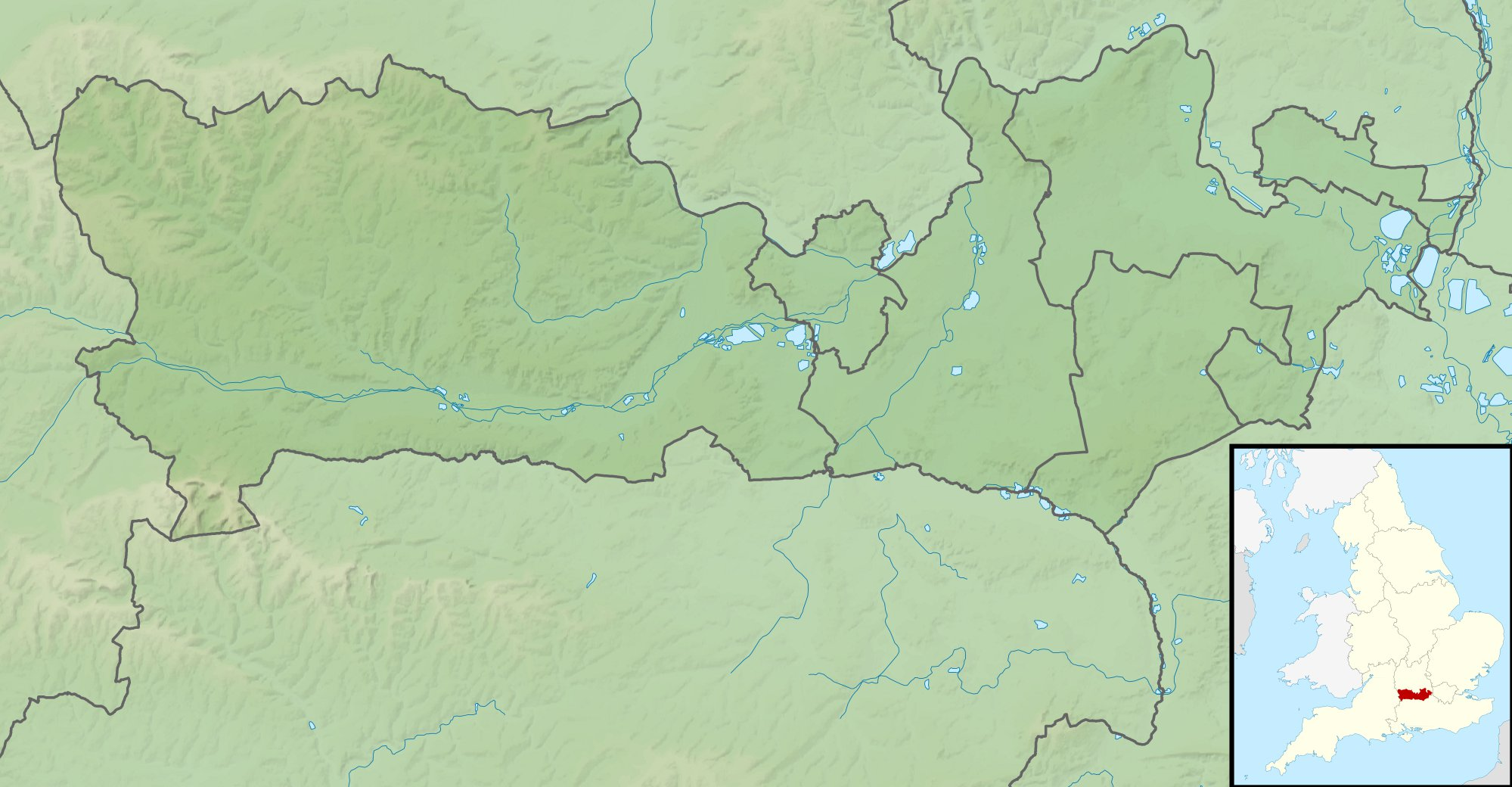
- Location of the synagogue in Berkshire

Religion
- Affiliation: Modern Orthodox Judaism
- Rite: Nusach Ashkenaz
- Ecclesiastical or organisational status: Synagogue
- Leadership: Rabbi Zvi Solomons
- Status: Active

Location
- Location: West Central Reading, Berkshire, England
- Country: United Kingdom
- Coordinates: 51°27′06″N 0°59′50″W

Architecture
- Established: 2015 (as a congregation)

Website
- jcob.org

The Jewish Community of Berkshire (abbreviated as JCoB) is a Modern Orthodox Jewish community and synagogue based in Reading, Berkshire, England, in the United Kingdom. The congregation worships in the Ashkenazi rite.

The community was established in 2015, following an accident when the rabbi injured his knee and was unable to walk to synagogue. Its rabbi is Zvi Solomons, formerly the rabbi of Reading Hebrew Congregation. Synagogue services are held in the rabbi's home, and the community hosts the only Orthodox rabbinic couple (Rabbi Zvi Solomons and Rebbetzen Dr Shira Batya Lewin Solomons) and cheder in Berkshire.

JCoB also provides a visiting service to schools in the region to teach Judaism as part of the religious education syllabus agreed by their local SACREs.

== See also ==
- History of the Jews in England
- List of Jewish communities in the United Kingdom
- List of synagogues in the United Kingdom
