= Tikvah Chadasha =

Reform synagogue in Essex, England

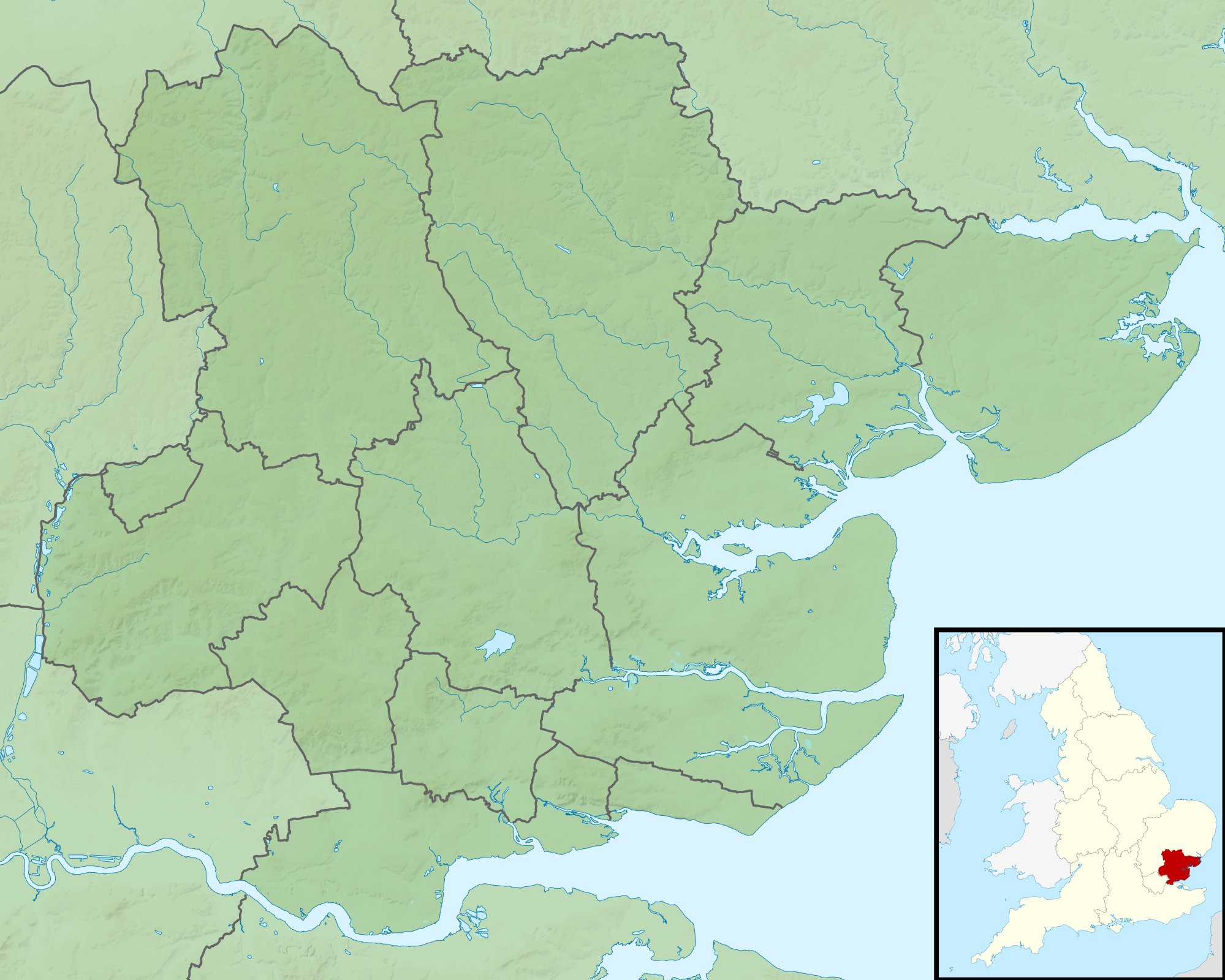
- Where the congregation meets in Essex

Religion
- Affiliation: Reform Judaism
- Ecclesiastical or organizational status: Congregation
- Status: Active

Location
- Location: Brentwood, Essex, England
- Country: United Kingdom
- Interactive map of Tikvah Chadasha
- Coordinates: 51°37′12″N 0°18′18″E

Architecture
- Established: 2010 (as a congregation)

Website
- tikvahchadasha.com

Tikvah Chadasha (Hebrew for "New Hope"), also known as the Brentwood Reform Synagogue, Rosh Tikvah, and Brentwood and Shenfield Synagogue, is a Reform Jewish congregation that meets in Brentwood, Essex, England, in the United Kingdom.

Founded in 2010, the congregation was a former constituent community of Liberal Judaism, and it became a member of the Movement for Reform Judaism in June 2021.

Services are held in a Brentwood school.

== See also ==
- History of the Jews in England
- List of Jewish communities in the United Kingdom
- List of synagogues in the United Kingdom
