= South Hampshire Reform Jewish Community =

Reform synagogue in Hampshire, England

Religion
- Affiliation: Reform Judaism
- Ecclesiastical or organizational status: Congregation
- Status: Active

Location
- Location: Hampshire, England
- Country: United Kingdom

Architecture
- Established: 1983 (as a congregation)

The South Hampshire Reform Jewish Community is a Reform Jewish congregation in Hampshire, England, in the United Kingdom. Founded in 1983, the congregation a member of the Movement for Reform Judaism.

Services are held in members' homes and at community venues in Portsmouth, Southampton and Winchester.

== See also ==
- History of the Jews in England
- List of Jewish communities in the United Kingdom
- List of synagogues in the United Kingdom
