= New Stoke Newington Shul =

Synagogue in London

- Location of Stoke Newington in Greater London

Religion
- Affiliation: Conservative Judaism
- Rite: Masorti Judaism
- Ecclesiastical or organisational status: Synagogue
- Leadership: Roni Tabick
- Status: Active

Location
- Location: Stoke Newington, London, England
- Country: United Kingdom
- Coordinates: 51°34′N 0°05′W

Architecture
- Established: 2007 (as a congregation)

Website
- newstokenewingtonshul.org

New Stoke Newington Shul is a Masorti Jewish congregation, located in Stoke Newington in the Borough of Hackney, London, England, in the United Kingdom. The congregation is led by its inaugural rabbi, Roni Tabick, appointed in 2015.

The community was established in 2007 as the Haringey/Stoke Newington Masorti Group. Services are held weekly in local community centres and, as of April 2024, the congregation did not have its own synagogue.

== Notable members ==
- Jonathan Freedland, a journalist
- Lord Glasman, a Labour life peer

== See also ==
- History of the Jews in England
- List of Jewish communities in the United Kingdom
- List of synagogues in the United Kingdom
