= Wembley United Synagogue =

Orthodox synagogue in Wembley Park, London, England

- Location of the synagogue in Greater London

Religion
- Affiliation: Orthodox Judaism
- Ecclesiastical or organisational status: Synagogue
- Status: Active

Location
- Location: 88 Wembley Park Drive, Wembley Park, Borough of Brent, London, England HA9 8HW
- Country: United Kingdom
- Coordinates: 51°33′44″N 0°17′24″W

Architecture
- Established: 1928 (as a congregation)
- Completed: 1934 (Forty Lane #1); 1956 (Forty Lane #2); 2023 (Wembley Park Drive)

Website
- wembleysynagogue.com

Wembley Synagogue is an Orthodox Jewish congregation and synagogue, located at 88 Wembley Park Drive in Wembley Park, Borough of Brent, London, England, in the United Kingdom. The congregation is a member of the United Synagogue.

== Synagogue ==
The demographics of the local Middlesex Jewish communities incorporating Wembley, Kenton and Kingsbury are such that these communities are in terminal decline. From a peak in the 1980s of between 5-10% of the borough's population and numbering between 10,000-20,000, down to 1% in 2021. In 2017 Wembley Synagogue had an average Saturday morning attendance of 20 to 30 people. On 11 December 2022, the Community held a farewell mevent attended by the Chief Rabbi, US dignitaries, Rabbi Fine (a former Rabbi of the community) and some 300 current and past members. A new purpose-built synagogue was built for the community in Wembley Park Drive. This was completed in February 2023 and is now occupied by the community. Following the final prayer service, the building in Forty Avenue, acquired by the Dawat-e-Islami, a global Sunni Islam organisation, was handed over and preparations for a conversion into a mosque are underway. Meanwhile, in Wembley Park Drive Saturday morning services are currently attracting between 25 and 35 men and women.

== History ==
By 1928 there were already a few isolated Jewish families living in Wembley who felt they wanted to get together for the purpose of worship and in order to facilitate Hebrew and Religious Education. At that time the nearest organised communities were at Cricklewood, Harrow and Ealing. But the movement of Jewish populations from east, north and Central London had already begun and one of the directions it took was towards the Northwestern suburbs of London which had been made accessible by the rapid transport facilities afforded by the Metropolitan and other railways lines.

The first meeting at which it was decided to form the Wembley Hebrew Congregation took place on 5 September 1928. Mr H Hooberman was appointed Chairman of the Congregation. The first classes were held in January 1929. A Ladies' Guild was formed in February 1930 and the Congregation became affiliated to the United Synagogue in 1931.

At first the services were held only at Festival times and without any congregational premises various halls had to be used such as the Union Hall in Ealing Road, Mitchell's Restaurant in Wembley High Road and later the Capital Ballroom in Empire Way. At the end of 1931 membership had risen to 64 and already the feeling for finding a permanent home had prompted the Committee to purchase part of the site of the present synagogue buildings. 1934 saw the firm establishment of the Wembley Community. On 22 April, Sir Isidore Salmon laid the Foundation Stone of the first temporary synagogue. In June the decision was taken to appoint a Minister and a call was extended to the then Rev. Myer Berman. In the same year, the status of the synagogue was raised to that of a District Synagogue. On 2 September, the Induction of the Minister and the Consecration of the Synagogue was performed by the then Chief Rabbi of the UK, Joseph H. Hertz.

In August 1939 the Ladies Guild purchased the first Sefer Torah for the synagogue. In November of that year the house next door to the open site, 12 Forty Avenue, was purchased. A Building Fund had been formed with Sir Isidore Salmon, who was the Member of Parliament for the Harrow West constituency, which then included Wembley, as President. Membership rapidly increased between then and the outbreak of World War II and further building operations of a temporary character had to be undertaken.

Rev. Berman was commissioned in 1940 as a chaplain in the army until his return to Wembley on demobilisation in March 1946. The Rev. S. Venitt was appointed as temporary Minister during his absence. In 1949 it was realised that the site of the synagogue would be too small to accommodate the new synagogue whenever it was built. And when the opportunity arose, 10 Forty Avenue was purchased so that a total frontage of some 200 ft. was made available for future development. It was felt that one comprehensive scheme should be prepared and building operation commenced on that section which would house the Classes Wing. Accommodation for the children's education was thought to be a priority.

On 23 March 1953 the foundation stone of the classroom wing was laid and on 25 October the classroom wing was consecrated by Chief Rabbi Israel Brodie. After numerous appeals and fund raising efforts, building operations on the new synagogue were commenced in 1956 and the foundation stone was laid on 17 November 1956.

== Clergy ==
Rabbi Myer Berman, Rabbi Ivor Abrams, Rabbi Yisroel Fine, Rabbi David Radomsky, Rabbi Martin van den Bergh and Rabbi Simon HarrisRev. L Klein from 1949 to 1956, Rev. Ahrn Meir Lev from 1958 to 1974, Rev. Stephen Robins from 1974 to 1986, Rev Alan Bright from 1987 to 1990, Rev Mark Goldman from 1990 to 1991 and Chazan Anthony Wolfson 1991 – July 2011

== Concerts ==
Wembley Synagogue has held a number of Chazanut Concerts. On Sunday 7 December Stephen Glass from Montreal hosted a Voices in Harmony Concert featuring Cantor Gideon Zelermyer and a choir from North America. The London Cantorial Singers held their annual Selichot Services in September 2006 and again in September 2009 featuring international Cantor Dovid Weinbach. In February 2009 the London Jewish Male Choir and The London Cantorial Singers held the Peter Heimann Memorial Concert.

== See also ==
- History of the Jews in England
- List of Jewish communities in the United Kingdom
- List of synagogues in the United Kingdom
