= Brondesbury Park Synagogue =

Religion
- Affiliation: Orthodox Judaism
- Leadership: Rabbi Baruch Levine
- Year consecrated: about 1939

Location
- Location: 143 Brondesbury Park, London, NW2 5JL
- Interactive map of Brondesbury Park Synagogue
- Coordinates: 51.54608011564481°N 0.22433686631302488°W

Website
- bpark.org

Brondesbury Park Synagogue, commonly referred to as Bpark, is an Orthodox Jewish congregation and synagogue located at 143 Brondesbury Park in the London Borough of Brent.

Brondesbury Park is a member of the United Synagogue.

The rabbinic couple since 2004 has been Rabbi Baruch and Rebbetzen Kezi Levin.

== See also ==
- History of the Jews in England
- List of synagogues in the United Kingdom
