= Sinai Synagogue (Leeds) =

Reform Jewish congregation in Leeds, West Yorkshire, England

Sinai Synagogue, Leeds
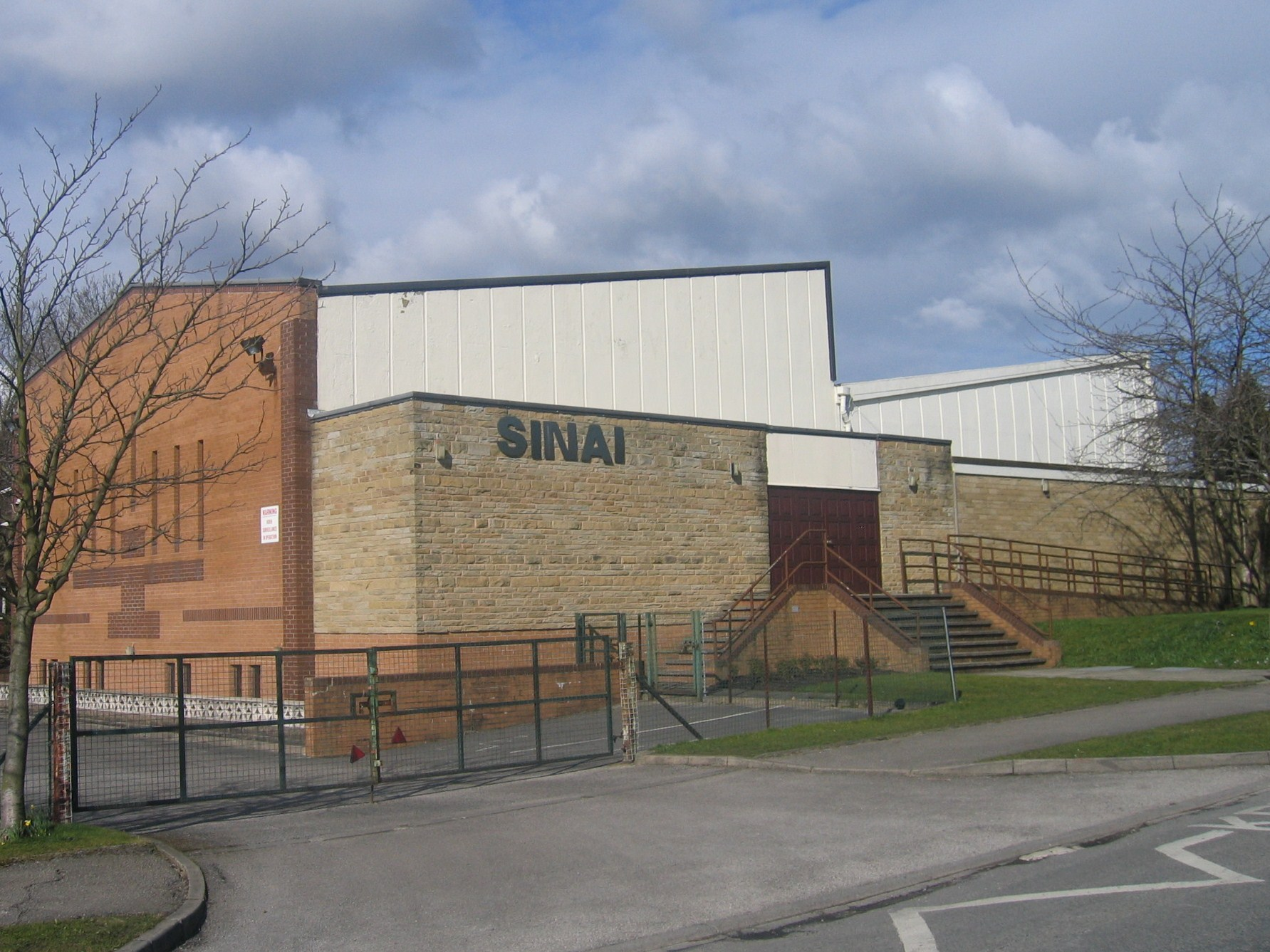
- The synagogue in 2008

- Location of the synagogue in Yorkshire

Religion
- Affiliation: Reform Judaism
- Ecclesiastical or organizational status: Synagogue
- Leadership: Rachel Weston (Cantor)
- Status: Active

Location
- Location: Roman Avenue, Roundhay, Leeds, West Yorkshire, England LS8 2AN
- Country: United Kingdom
- Interactive map of Sinai Synagogue, Leeds
- Coordinates: 53°50′50″N 1°30′37″W

Architecture
- Architects: Halpern & Associates
- Type: Synagogue architecture
- Style: Modernist
- Established: 1944 (as a congregation)
- Completed: 1960

Website
- sinaileeds.uk

Sinai Synagogue is a Reform Jewish congregation and synagogue, located on Roman Avenue in Roundhay, Leeds, West Yorkshire, England, in the United Kingdom. The congregation was founded in 1944 and is affiliated to the Movement for Reform Judaism.

== History ==
Prior to World War II the Jewish community in Leeds was overwhelmingly Orthodox. Rabbi L. Graf of the Reform Synagogue in Bradford attempted to start a community of worship in Leeds, presiding over a service of six people in a house in Oakwood on 8 January 1944. Numbers grew and services moved to a variety of sites, eventually buying the defunct Sephardi Synagogue building at 21 Leopold Street, Leeds 7 in November 1951, which was used until 16 September 1960.

Plans for a new building on Roman Avenue began in 1957. Construction began in March 1960, and was completed in November of the same year. It was designed by Halpern & Associates of London. On 12 June 1960 the foundation stone was laid and a section of Harehills Cemetery consecrated for the use of the congregation. The building was consecrated on 6 November 1960.

In 1969 it was recognised as a "major organisation in the community" by the Leeds Jewish Representative Council, gaining a seat on the Council's executive.

Cultural activities such as religious classes expanded until they were too large for the rooms, so a temporary building was erected in the car park in 1965; this was used until 1985, by which time additional rooms had been attached to the synagogue.

The community has a burial ground in current use at Harehills Cemetery, Leeds, which is managed by Leeds City Council.

The congregation publishes a quarterly magazine, the Sinai Chronicle.

== See also ==
- History of the Jews in England
- List of Jewish communities in the United Kingdom
- List of synagogues in the United Kingdom
