= Aberdeen Synagogue and Jewish Community Centre =

Synagogue in Aberdeen, Scotland

- Location of the synagogue in Scotland

Religion
- Affiliation: Judaism
- Ecclesiastical or organisational status: Synagogue
- Leadership: Lay-led
- Status: Active

Location
- Location: Aberdeen, Scotland
- Country: United Kingdom
- Coordinates: 57°08′32″N 2°06′12″W

Architecture
- Type: House
- Established: 1893 (as a congregation); 6 June 1945; 81 years ago (synagogue)

Website
- asjcc.co.uk

The Aberdeen Synagogue and Jewish Community Centre (ASJCC) is a Jewish congregation and synagogue, located at 74 Dee Street, Aberdeen, Scotland, in the United Kingdom. The building is the northernmost synagogue in the British Isles.

== History ==
Several Jews were awarded medical degrees from Aberdeen in the 18th century, but they did not live in Aberdeen (the degrees were awarded in absentia). Jews were living in Aberdeen by the late 19th century. The Aberdeen Hebrew Congregation was founded in 1893, and initially worshipped in a flat on 34 Marischal Street.

In July 1944, Aberdeen Town Council denied a planning application from the congregation to convert a residence on Dee Street into a synagogue and community centre. The decision was overturned following an appeal in September 1944 and the synagogue opened on 6 June 1945, with the consecration service held by the rabbi Kopul Rosen.

In 2016 Aberdeen Hebrew Congregation was reorganised and renamed as Aberdeen Synagogue and Jewish Community Centre.

On 28 August 2017, the congregation's washing machine malfunctioned, flooding the building and tearing a hole in the synagogue's ceiling. Following repairs, the synagogue reopened in May 2018.

== Community ==
According to the census, there are about 250 Jews in the Aberdeen area (city and shire). The community is mostly incomers who come to Aberdeen to work or study. The ASJCC tries to support all Jews in the Aberdeen area, regardless of which type of Judaism they follow.

There is a burial area for Jews in Grove Cemetery.

There is also a Jewish Students Society in Aberdeen, which works closely with the ASJCC.

The community has not had a permanent full-time rabbi since the 1950s. Most services are led by lay members of the community, but rabbis do visit to lead services on major holidays and events. ASJCC's website has up-to-date details about services and events.

== See also ==
- List of Jewish communities in the United Kingdom
- History of the Jews in Scotland
- Scottish Council of Jewish Communities
