= Menorah Synagogue =

Reform Jewish congregation and synagogue in South Manchester, England

- Location of the synagogue in Greater Manchester

Religion
- Affiliation: Reform Judaism
- Ecclesiastical or organizational status: Synagogue
- Leadership: Rabbi Kath Vardi
- Status: Active

Location
- Location: 198 Altrincham Road, Sharston, Wythenshawe, South Manchester, England M22 4RZ
- Country: United Kingdom
- Interactive map of Menorah Synagogue
- Coordinates: 53°23′37″N 2°15′14″W

Architecture
- Established: 1963 (as a congregation)

Website
- menorah.org.uk

Menorah Synagogue is a Reform Jewish congregation and synagogue, located on Altrincham Road, Sharston, Wythenshawe, in South Manchester, England, in the United Kingdom. Founded in 1963 as the Cheshire Reform Congregation, the community is a member of the Movement for Reform Judaism.

The rabbi of the congregation is Kath Vardi who succeeded Rabbi Fabian Sborovsky,

== See also ==
- History of the Jews in England
- List of Jewish communities in the United Kingdom
- List of synagogues in the United Kingdom
