= Cardiff Reform Synagogue =

Synagogue in Cardiff, Wales

- Welsh: Synagog Ddiwygiedig Caerdydd
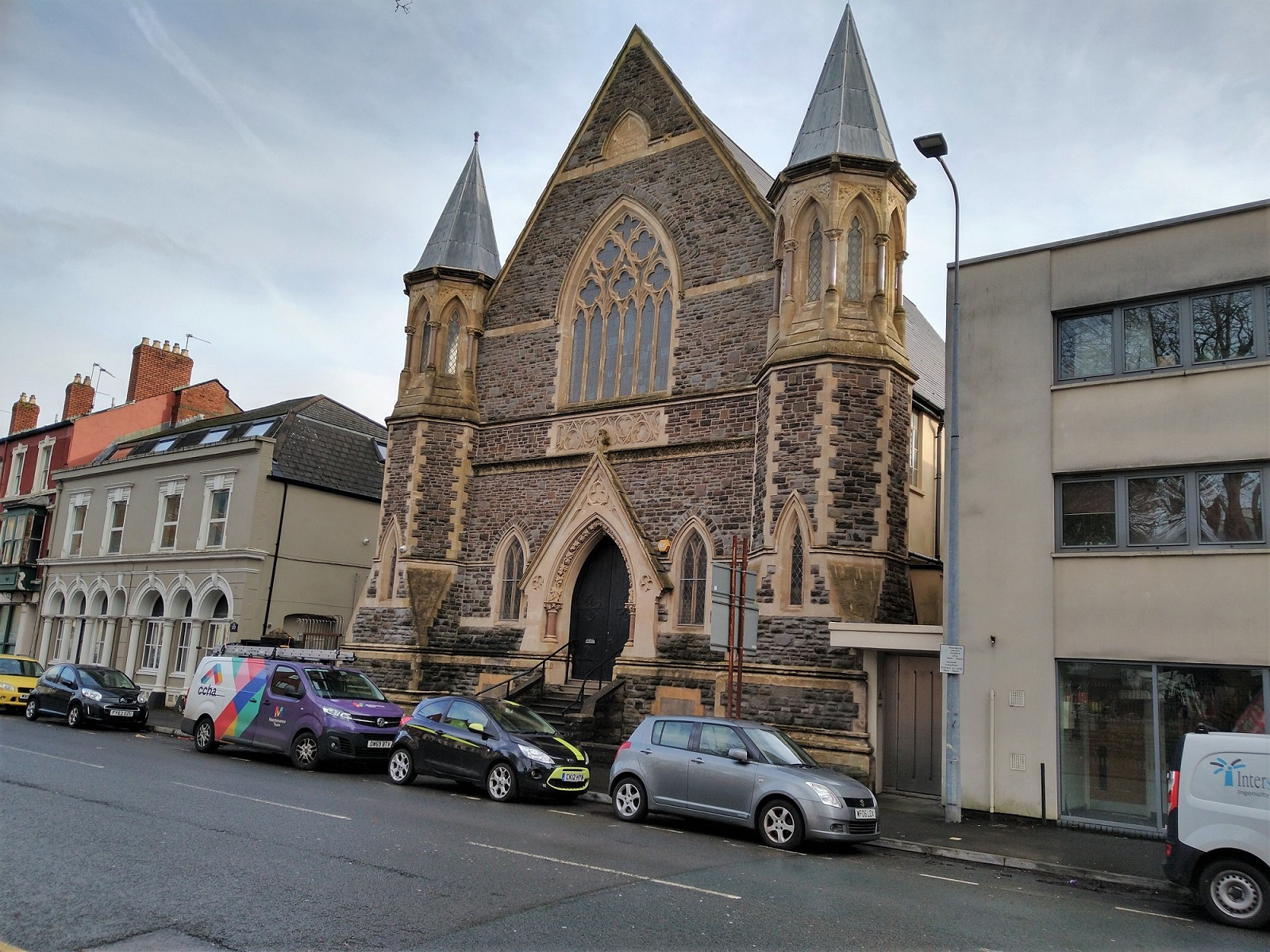

- Location of the synagogue in Wales

Religion
- Affiliation: Reform Judaism
- Ecclesiastical or organizational status: Synagogue
- Status: Active

Location
- Location: Moira Terrace, Adamsdown, Cardiff, Wales CF24 0EJ
- Country: United Kingdom
- Interactive map of Cardiff Reform Synagogue
- Coordinates: 51°28′58″N 3°09′52″W

Architecture
- Type: Chapel
- Established: 1948 (as a congregation)
- Completed: 1861 (as a chapel); 1952 (as a synagogue)

Website
- cardiffreformsynagogue.uk

Cardiff Reform Synagogue (Welsh: Synagog Ddiwygiedig Caerdydd; formerly Cardiff New Synagogue; Welsh: Synagog Newydd Caerdydd) is a Reform Jewish synagogue, located on Moira Terrace, Adamsdown, in Cardiff, Wales, in the United Kingdom. The congregation is a member of the Movement for Reform Judaism.

== Congregation ==
Cardiff New Synagogue was founded in 1948 to provide Jewish religious services in a less traditional style than those previously available in Cardiff. This attracted newly arrived immigrants from Germany, Czechoslovakia, Austria and elsewhere. The synagogue's name was later changed to Cardiff Reform Synagogue.

Services were initially held in Cardiff's Temple of Peace and Health, a non-religious civic building in Cathays Park.

In 2010, the synagogue was awarded over £33,000 by the Heritage Lottery Fund for a project showing how Reform Jews, some of whom had fled from central Europe, had adapted to life in Wales.

== Building ==
In 1952, the community purchased Salem Welsh Baptist Chapel in Moira Terrace, Adamsdown, Cardiff, which it converted for use of a synagogue. The chapel was built in 1861 and was modified in 1877 and 1919.

== See also ==
- List of Jewish communities in the United Kingdom
- History of the Jews in Wales
