= Jaclyn Chernett =

Musicologist

Chazan Jaclyn (Jacky) Chernett is a musicologist and lecturer who is Cantor at Kol Nefesh Masorti Synagogue in Edgware in the London Borough of Barnet. She was ordained as a cantor in 2006, receiving her semikhah from the Academy for Jewish Religion (AJR) in New York and becoming the first female cantor in the United Kingdom.

Chernett is a vice-president of Masorti Judaism in the UK and the founder, in 2017, of the European Academy for Jewish Liturgy (EAJL). She is an Associate member of the London College of Music and received an M.Phil degree in Ethnomusicology in Biblical Chant from City University, London in 1998.

She lives in Edgware.
