= Seven Hills Shul =

Jewish community in Sheffield, England

- קְהִלַּת שִׁבְעָה הָרִים
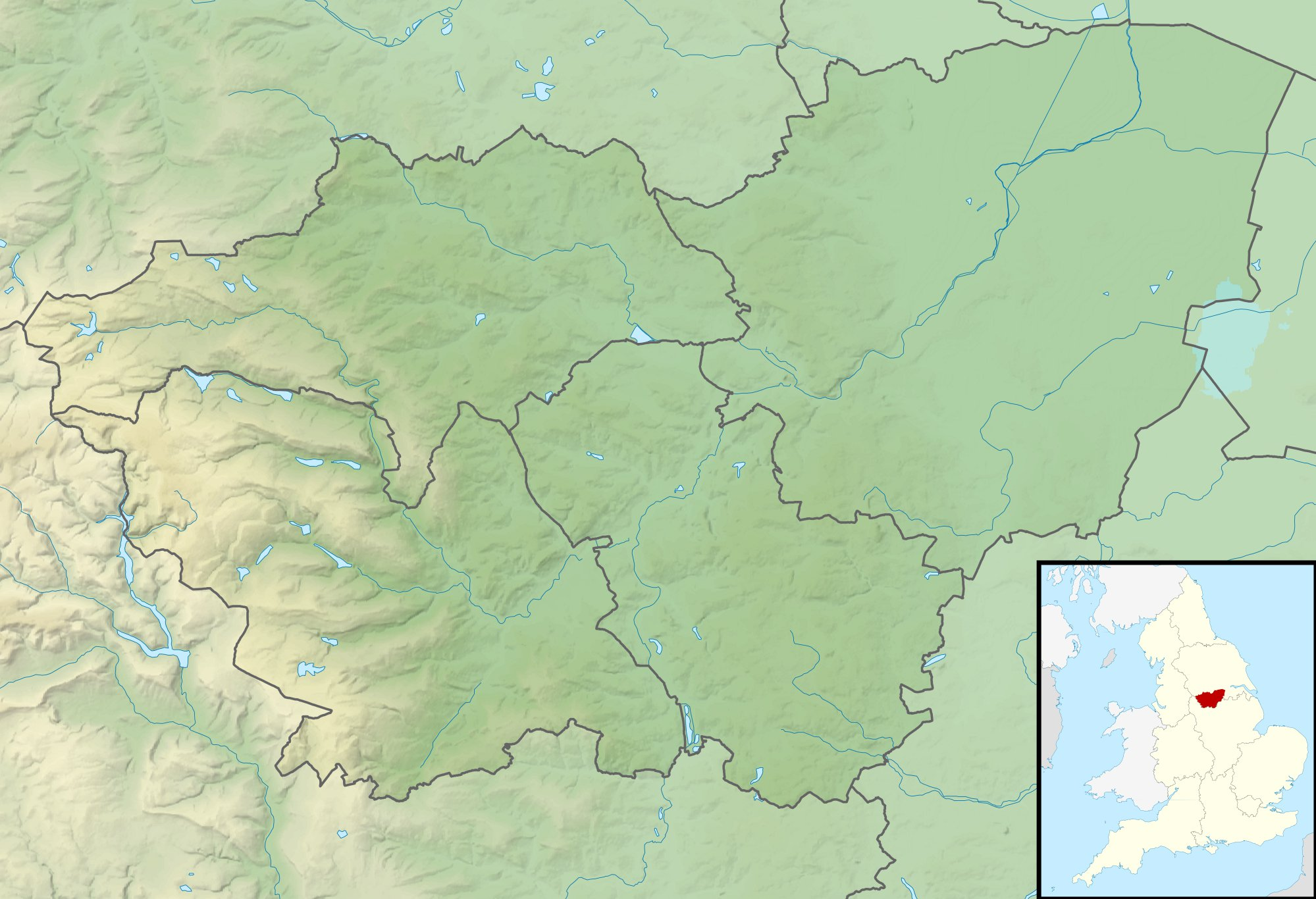
- Location of the synagogue in South Yorkshire

Religion
- Affiliation: Progressive Judaism
- Ecclesiastical or organisational status: Congregation
- Status: Active

Location
- Location: Sheffield, South Yorkshire, England
- Country: United Kingdom
- Coordinates: 53°22′51″N 01°28′13″W

Architecture
- Established: 1989 (as a congregation)

Website
- www.shef-ref.co.uk

Seven Hills Shul (Hebrew: קהילת שבעה הרים transliteration: "Kehillat Shivah Harim"), is a Progressive Jewish community congregation that worships from rented premises located in Sheffield, South Yorkshire, England, in the United Kingdom and therefore is not considered a synagogue. The congregation holds services at several premises, throughout the year marks major holidays and also meets in members' houses. Seven Hills Shul is one of two Jewish congregations in Sheffield, the other being Kingfield Synagogue.

Founded in 1989 as Sheffield and District Reform Jewish Congregation, the congregation is a member of the Movement for Progressive Judaism. Prior to the creation of the Movement for Progressive Judaism in late 2025, the community was affiliated with Reform Judaism. The congregation is also active in local interfaith activities.

== See also ==
- History of the Jews in England
- List of Jewish communities in the United Kingdom
- List of synagogues in the United Kingdom
