= York Liberal Jewish Community =

Jewish community in York, England

Religion
- Affiliation: Liberal Judaism
- Status: Active

Location
- Location: York, England, United Kingdom

Website
- jewsinyork.org.uk

The York Liberal Jewish Community is a Jewish community based in York, North Yorkshire, England. It was founded in 2014 and is a constituent member of Liberal Judaism. It holds services, usually on the second Saturday of the month, in York.

== See also ==
- List of Jewish communities in the United Kingdom
