= Thanet & District Reform Synagogue =

Reform synagogue in Kent, England

- Location of the synagogue in Kent

Religion
- Affiliation: Reform Judaism
- Ecclesiastical or organizational status: Synagogue
- Leadership: Rabbi Cliff Cohen
- Status: Active

Location
- Location: 293A Margate Road, Ramsgate, Thanet, Kent, England CT12 6TE
- Country: United Kingdom
- Interactive map of Thanet & District Reform Synagogue
- Coordinates: 51°21′00″N 1°24′17″E

Architecture
- Established: 1985 (as a congregation)
- Completed: c. 1990

Website
- tdrs.org.uk

Thanet & District Reform Synagogue, also known as Etz Chaim, is a Reform Jewish congregation and synagogue, located at 293A Margate Road in Ramsgate in Thanet, Kent, England, in the United Kingdom. Founded in 1985, the congregation is a member of the Movement for Reform Judaism.

Cliff Cohen is the community's rabbi. The congregation publishes a journal, named Etz Chaim.

== See also ==
- History of the Jews in England
- List of Jewish communities in the United Kingdom
- List of synagogues in the United Kingdom
