= Coventry Jewish Reform Community =

Reform Judaism congregation in England

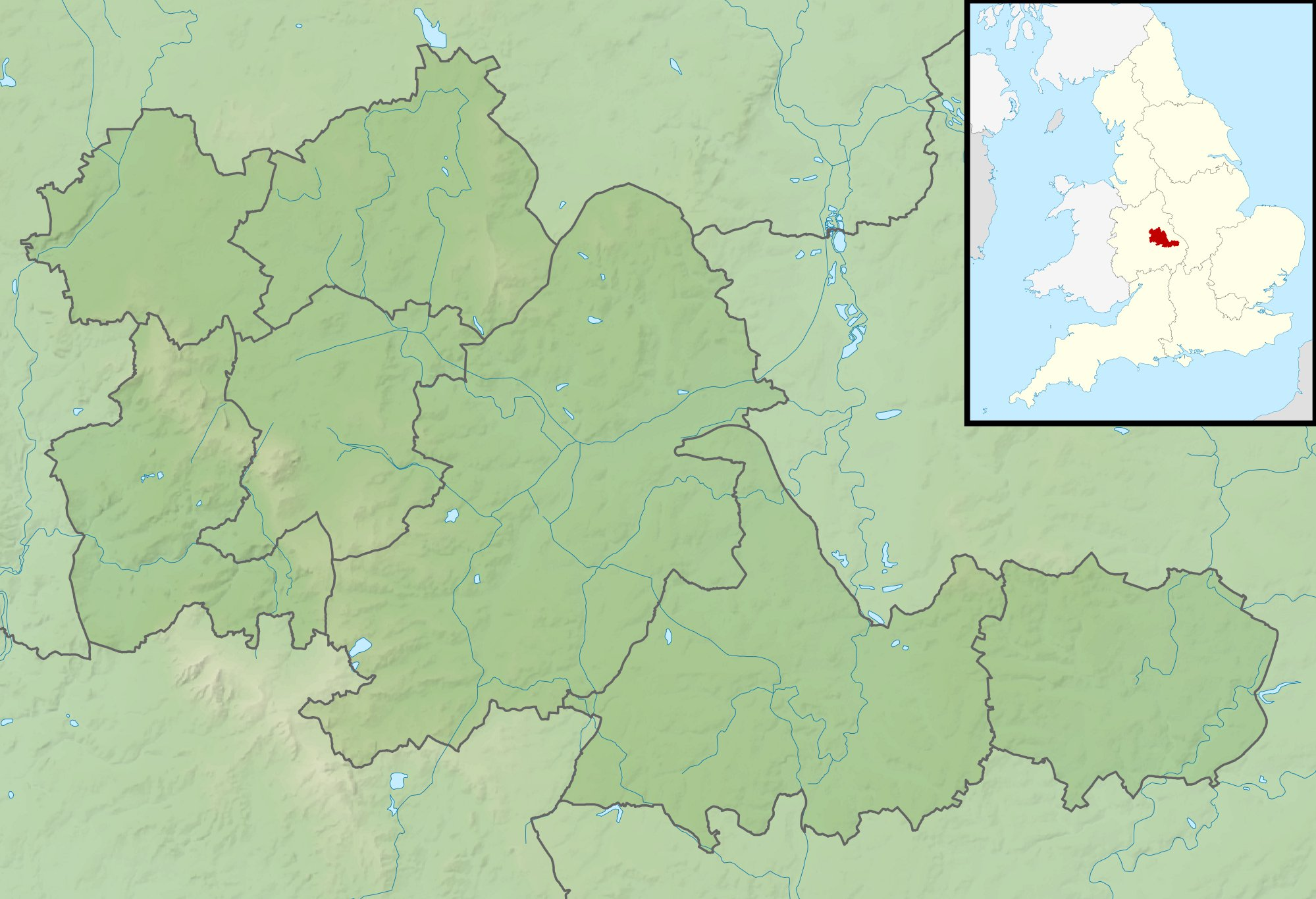
- Location of the synagogue in the West Midlands county

Religion
- Affiliation: Reform Judaism
- Ecclesiastical or organizational status: Congregation
- Status: Active

Location
- Location: Coventry, West Midlands, England
- Country: United Kingdom
- Interactive map of Coventry Jewish Reform Community
- Coordinates: 52°23′41″N 1°32′37″W

Architecture
- Established: 1993 (as a congregation)

Website
- coventryjewishreformcommunity.com

The Coventry Jewish Reform Community is a Reform Jewish congregation, located in Coventry, in the West Midlands county of England, in the United Kingdom.

Founded in October 1993, the congregation is a member of the Movement for Reform Judaism.

== See also ==
- History of the Jews in England
- List of Jewish communities in the United Kingdom
- List of synagogues in the United Kingdom
