= Northampton Hebrew Congregation =

Orthodox Jewish congregation and synagogue in Northampton, England

Coordinates: 52.2415°N 0.8909°W

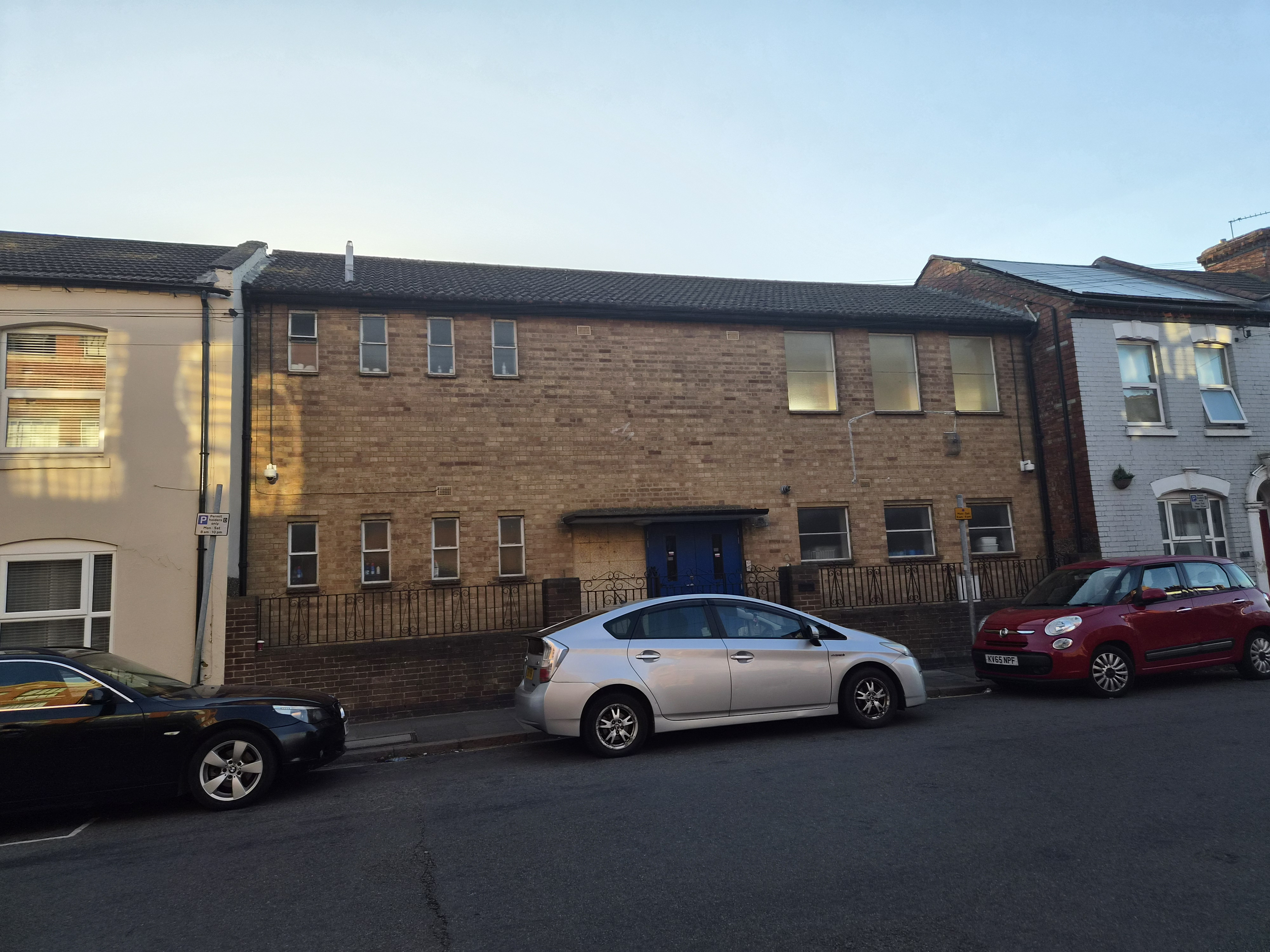
- The synagogue on Overstone Road, Northampton, in 2026

Religion
- Affiliation: Orthodox Judaism
- Rite: Ashkenazi
- Ecclesiastical or organisational status: Unaffiliated congregation under the aegis of the Chief Rabbi

Location
- Location: 95–97 Overstone Road, Northampton, NN1 3JW
- Country: England

Architecture
- Established: 1888 (congregation)
- Completed: 1966 (current building)

Website
- www.northantshc.org

The Northampton Hebrew Congregation is an Orthodox Jewish congregation in Northampton, England. Formally founded in 1888, it has worshipped at a synagogue on Overstone Road since 1890. The original synagogue building, a prefabricated former mission church, was replaced by the present building in the mid-1960s. The congregation follows the Ashkenazi Orthodox rite and is an unaffiliated provincial congregation under the aegis of the Chief Rabbi.

== Background ==
There was a substantial Jewish community in medieval Northampton from at least the 12th century until the expulsion of the Jews from England in 1290; in the 12th century it was among the larger Jewish communities in England. The remains of the town's medieval synagogue, identified in 2010 beneath premises on Sheep Street, and traces of the medieval Jewish cemetery have both been located by researchers.

Although Jews were readmitted to England in 1656, resettlement in Northampton only began in the mid-19th century. Among the early arrivals was George Leopold Michel, a German-born leather merchant and shoe machinist who settled in the town around 1858 and became a pioneer of Northampton's mechanised shoe industry. The Jewish population grew in the 1880s with the arrival of refugees fleeing intensified persecution in the Russian Empire following the assassination of Tsar Alexander II in 1881.

== History ==
=== Formation ===
Services were being organised in private homes in Northampton by 1885, when a room in Michel's house was dedicated for use as a synagogue. The congregation was formally founded in 1888, when its "Laws, Rules, and Regulations" were signed; it was lent a Sefer Torah by the Nottingham community and appointed a shochet. The early membership was largely made up of people of modest means working in the shoe and leather trades or as tailors. Michel served as the congregation's first president, and other founding figures included Morris Moss and the shoe manufacturer Phineas Hayman. Before acquiring a permanent home, the congregation met in hired halls, including a temporary synagogue in the town's Corn Exchange from the High Holy Days of 1889.

=== The Overstone Road synagogue ===
In 1890 the congregation acquired a building at Overstone Road from the New Jerusalem Church (Swedenborgians). The structure, thought to date from about 1877, was a prefabricated wood and corrugated-iron mission church, sometimes described as an "iron church", and its interior was adapted for use as a synagogue. The synagogue was consecrated on 3 September 1890, the dedication being solemnised by the acting Chief Rabbi, Dr Hermann Adler, and the first wedding was held there later the same year.

In 1902 the congregation secured a separate Jewish section within the municipal cemetery on Towcester Road, after some local debate over the merits of religious segregation in the cemetery; Jews from Northampton had previously been buried in Birmingham at considerable expense. The tailor Morris Kuyaski became the first Jew buried in consecrated ground in Northamptonshire for over 600 years. The Towcester Road Jewish section remains in use by the community.

=== Second World War ===
The Jewish population of Northampton, which had numbered around 100 in the early 20th century, reached its peak during the Second World War, when several hundred evacuees and refugees from London and elsewhere arrived in the town. A succession of ministers and army chaplains served the enlarged community during the war years, and wartime institutions included a kosher canteen in Palmerston Road for evacuees, refugees and service personnel, and a hostel for Jewish refugee children in Cliftonville. A local newspaper reported that around 1,000 Jewish civilians and servicemen attended Chanukah celebrations at the Town Hall in December 1943. Most of the wartime arrivals returned to London after 1945.

=== Rebuilding ===
The original corrugated-iron synagogue was demolished in 1964 and replaced by the present building, erected on the same site in the mid-1960s. The cost of rebuilding was supported by Warren Julius Wolff, chairman of a fine arts publishing company who had moved to Northampton from London during the war. The architectural historian Sharman Kadish records the rebuilding as completed in 1966.

== Congregation ==
The congregation follows the Ashkenazi Orthodox ritual and has historically been an unaffiliated provincial congregation under the aegis of the Chief Rabbi. Its ministers have included the Rev. Moses Bregman, appointed at the congregation's foundation in 1888, and, in the post-war era, the Rev. Harold Silman, who served from 1970 until 1993. Since at least the late 1980s, services have been held on Friday evenings and festivals, with occasional morning services, and visiting officiants have led High Holy Day services.

Membership has declined from its mid-20th-century peak: the town's Jewish population was estimated at around 600 in 1951, 322 in 2003, and roughly 100 in the early 2020s. Surveys recorded the congregation as having between 50 and 99 member households in 2010 and 2016. The congregation was registered as a charity (no. 1191560) in October 2020, and its synagogue is registered as a place of worship under the Places of Worship Registration Act 1855. It is a member community of the Jewish Small Communities Network, and the synagogue offers guided tours and educational talks for school visits.

== See also ==
- History of the Jews in England
- List of synagogues in the United Kingdom
