= Harlow Jewish Community =

Reform Jewish congregation

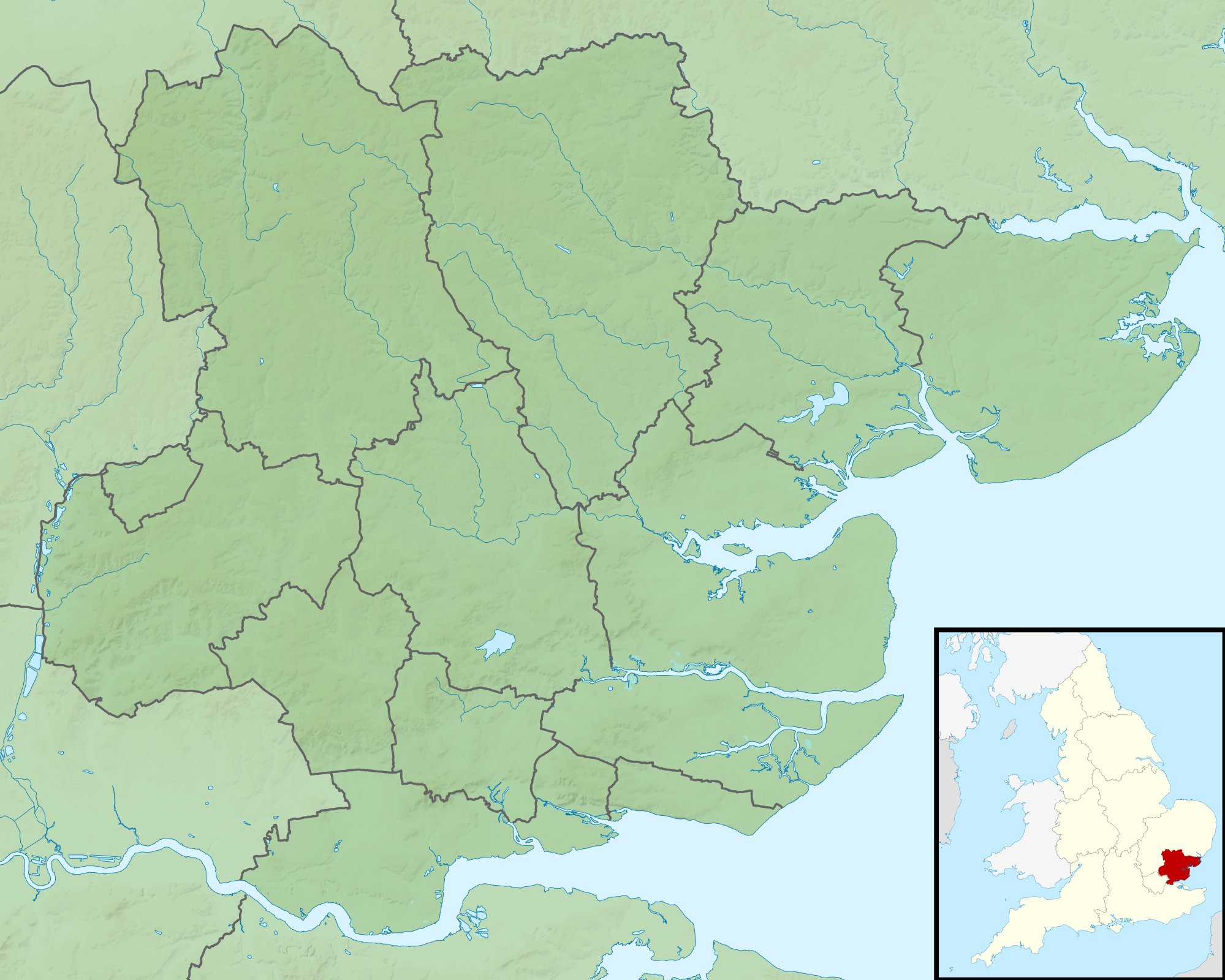
- Location of the synagogue in Essex

Religion
- Affiliation: Reform Judaism
- Ecclesiastical or organizational status: Synagogue
- Leadership: Rabbi Irit Shillor
- Status: Active

Location
- Location: Harberts Road, Harlow, Essex, England CM19 4DT
- Country: United Kingdom
- Interactive map of Harlow Jewish Community
- Coordinates: 51°45′46″N 0°05′04″E

Architecture
- Established: 1952 (as a congregation)

Website
- harlowjewishcommunity.org.uk

Harlow Jewish Community is a Reform Jewish congregation and synagogue, located at Harberts Road, Harlow, in Essex, England, in the United Kingdom.

Established in 1952, the congregation is a member of the Movement for Reform Judaism.

Irit Shillor has served as the congregation's rabbi since 2005.

== See also ==
The logo of the congregation

- History of the Jews in England
- List of Jewish communities in the United Kingdom
- List of synagogues in the United Kingdom
