= Mosaic Reform Synagogue =

Synagogue in Harrow, London, England

- Location within Greater London

Religion
- Affiliation: Reform Judaism
- Ecclesiastical or organizational status: Synagogue
- Leadership: Rabbi Kathleen de Magtige-Middleton
- Status: Active

Location
- Location: 1a Halsbury Close, 65 Stanmore Hill, Stanmore HA7 3DY
- Country: England, United Kingdom
- Interactive map of Mosaic Reform Synagogue
- Coordinates: 51.579°N 0.342°W

Architecture
- Established: 1959 (as a congregation)
- Completed: 2023 (current building)

Website
- choosemosaic.org/reform

Logo of the congregation

Mosaic Reform Synagogue is a Reform Jewish congregation and synagogue, located in Stanmore, in the Borough of Harrow, England, in the United Kingdom.

The congregation is a member of the Movement for Reform Judaism, and its rabbi is Kathleen de Magtige-Middleton.

== History ==
The community was established as Middlesex New Synagogue in 1959 and was based in Harrow from 1962 to 2022. Its current building is shared with two other congregations – Mosaic Liberal (formerly Harrow & Wembley Progressive Synagogue) and Mosaic Masorti (Hatch End Masorti Synagogue).

== See also ==
- History of the Jews in England
- List of Jewish communities in the United Kingdom
- List of synagogues in the United Kingdom
