= Ohel David Eastern Synagogue =

Synagogue in Golders Green, London

- Location of the synagogue in Greater London

Religion
- Affiliation: Orthodox Judaism
- Rite: Nusach Sepharadi/Edot Hamizrah
- Ecclesiastical or organisational status: Synagogue
- Status: Active

Location
- Location: 4-14 Broadwalk Lane, Golders Green, Borough of Barnet, London, England NW11 8HD
- Country: United Kingdom
- Coordinates: 51°34′28″N 0°12′04″W

Architecture
- Established: 1959 (as a congregation)
- Completed: 1959 (Leased); 2001 (purchased)

Website
- oheldavid.org

The Ohel David Eastern Synagogue is an Orthodox Jewish congregation and synagogue, located at 4-14 Broadwalk Lane, Golders Green, in the Borough of Barnet, London, England, in the United Kingdom. The congregation, that comprises Sephardi Jews from many parts of the world, especially Iraqi and other Mizrahi Jews, worships in the Sephardi rite.

== History ==
The synagogue was established in 1959. It was originally one of the synagogues that made up the Eastern Jewry Community, but is now independent.

The synagogue was led by Rabbi Abraham Gubbay until his death in July 2010. The present rabbi is Rabbi Asher Sebbag, and the hazzan is Mr Y. Tamir. The synagogue was significantly refurbished in 2001 by Ghassan Cohen and David Gigi.

Services take place daily in the main prayer room. There is a women's seating area separated from the men by a curtain, known in Hebrew as a mechitza. Shabbat services tend to finish at around 12 noon to 1 pm, depending on the time of year.

== See also ==
- History of the Jews in England
- List of Jewish communities in the United Kingdom
- List of synagogues in the United Kingdom
