= Totnes Reform Jewish Group =

Reform Jewish congregation in Devon, England

Totnes Reform Jewish Group, a member of the Movement for Reform Judaism, is a Reform Jewish congregation in Totnes, Devon, England. The congregation, which is also known as Totnes Jewish Community, dates from 2001.

== See also ==
- History of the Jews in England
- List of Jewish communities in the United Kingdom
- List of synagogues in the United Kingdom
