= Bury Hebrew Congregation =

Orthodox synagogue in Manchester, England

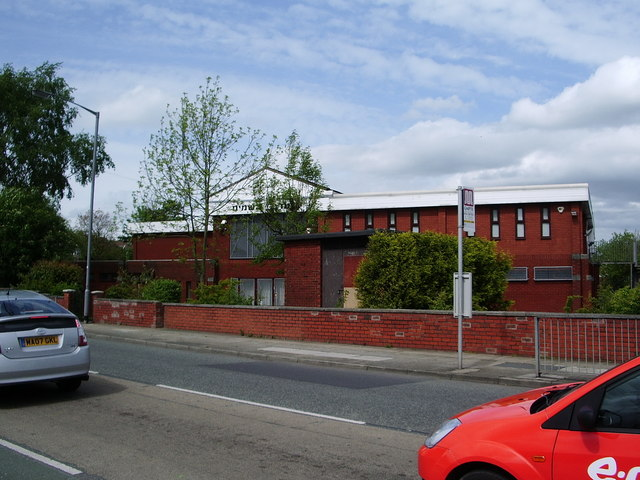
- The synagogue in 2007

- Location of the synagogue in Greater Manchester

Religion
- Affiliation: Orthodox Judaism
- Rite: Nusach Ashkenaz
- Ecclesiastical or organizational status: Synagogue
- Leadership: Rabbi Binyomin Singer
- Status: Active

Location
- Location: Sunnybank Road, Bury, North Manchester, England BL9 8ET
- Country: United Kingdom
- Interactive map of Bury Hebrew Congregation
- Coordinates: 53°33′46″N 2°17′27″W

Architecture
- Established: 1964 (as a congregation)
- Completed: 1976

Bury Hebrew Congregation, also known as Bet Knesset Sha'ar HahShamayim (Gate of Heaven Synagogue) is an Orthodox Jewish congregation and synagogue, located on Sunnybank Road, Bury, Manchester England, in the United Kingdom. The congregation was formed in 1964 and worships in the Ashkenazi rite. Its members are drawn from the suburbs of Sunnybank, Unsworth and Hollins.

== History ==
In 1964 a meeting was held at Blackford Bridge Reform Church. Plans were laid to purchase land to build a small synagogue. Prayers took place in members' homes until 18 June 1965, when a prefabricated building was purchased and services began to take place there. Soon afterwards, the first Rabbi was appointed, David Grunsfeld, who also taught at the cheder (Jewish studies school). In 1976, a new building was opened by Immanuel Jakobovits, who was then Chief Rabbi of the Commonwealth. In 1982 Grunsfeld left, and was replaced as rabbi by Moshe Fine, who was replaced three years later by Binyomin Singer.

=== Events since 1998 ===
The new Beis Hamedrash

In 1998, the Beit Hamedrash and study hall were opened. The study hall serves for weekday prayer services, small functions and the SEED study programme, and houses an extensive library. On 10 September 2000 the synagogue dedicated a Sefer Torah in memory of its late warden, Sol Weinstock.

== See also ==
- History of the Jews in England
- List of Jewish communities in the United Kingdom
- List of synagogues in the United Kingdom
