= Birmingham Central Synagogue =

Orthodox synagogue in Birmingham, England

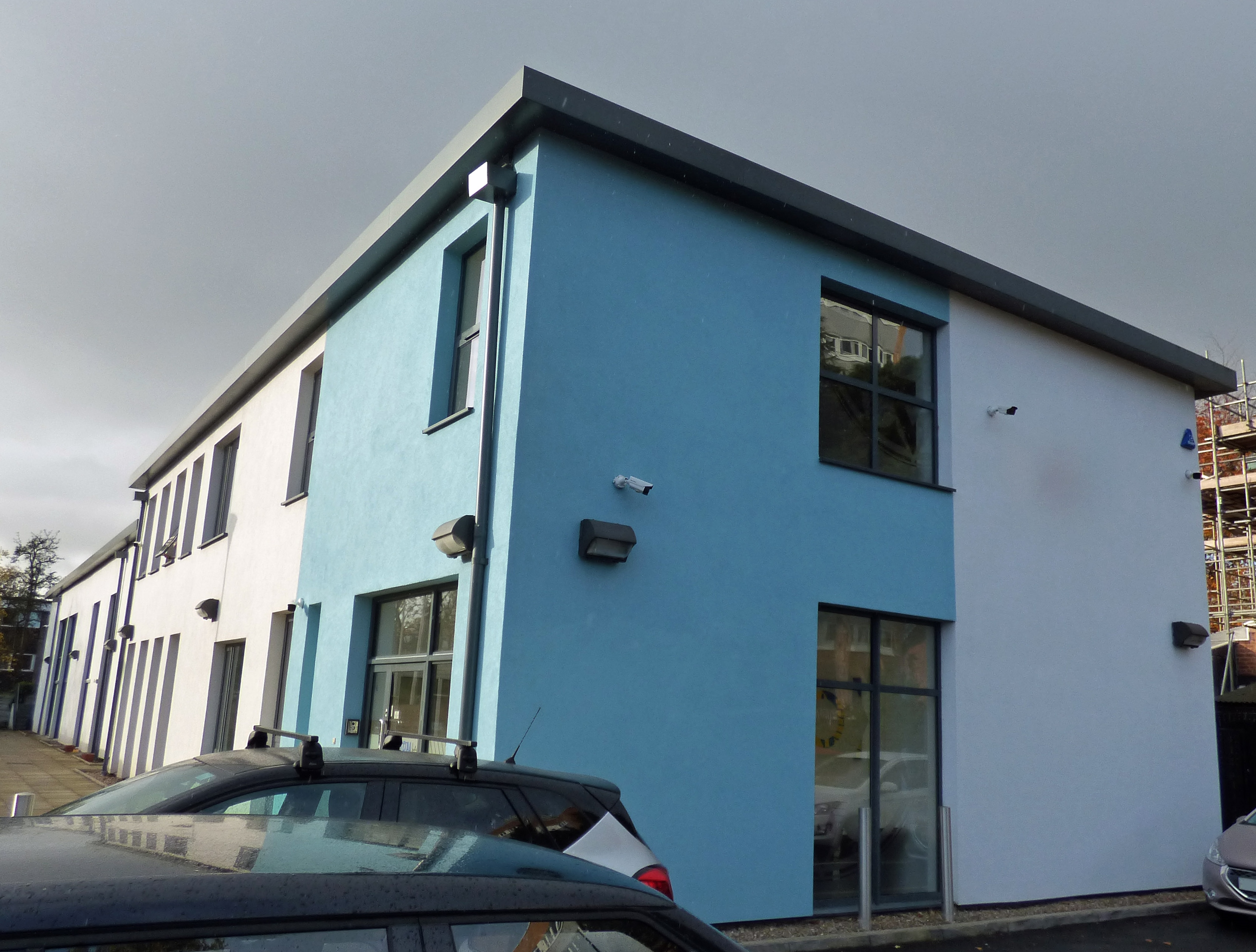
- The synagogue in 2017

- Location of the synagogue in the West Midlands

Religion
- Affiliation: Orthodox Judaism
- Rite: Nusach Ashkenaz
- Ecclesiastical or organisational status: Synagogue
- Status: Active

Location
- Location: 4 Speedwell Road, Edgbaston, Birmingham, West Midlands, England B5 7PR
- Country: United Kingdom
- Coordinates: 52°27′43″N 1°54′10″W

Architecture
- Established: 1894 (as a congregation)
- Completed: 1894 (Holloway Head); 1901 (Wrottesley Street); 1928 (Bristol Street); 1961 (Pershore Road); 2013 (Speedwell Road)

The Birmingham Central Synagogue is an Orthodox Jewish congregation and synagogue, located at 4 Speedwell Road in Edgbaston, Birmingham, in the West Midlands region of England, in the United Kingdom. The congregation, established in 1894, worships in the Ashkenazi rite.

== History ==
The community was established in a private house at 30 Holloway Head in 1884 before moving to Wrottesley Street in 1901 and then to Bristol Street in 1928, taking over a former Methodist Hall. In 1961 a small group of individuals acquired the large plot of land upon which a synagogue, hall and classrooms were built at 133 Pershore Road. The ground breaking ceremony took place in July 1958. Construction of the 1960s building took place between 1959 and 1961.

The congregation voted to sell the Pershore Road shul in 2010. For the next few years the congregation waited for planning permission from both Birmingham City Council and Calthorpe Estates. Redevelopment of the Malcolm Locker Hall into the new synagogue began in January 2013. Work was completed in July 2013, with the handover taking place in August 2013.

Of the 42 etched glass windows in the old building, only six could be saved (and were installed in the new shul). The other 36 were to be sold (some broke when they were removed).

From August 2013 the old building was in the hands of the developers, who had to first remove asbestos. The old shul building was completely demolished during October 2013. The developers, Seddon, built a 70-bed care home for Gracewell Healthcare on the former synagogue site.

== Current synagogue ==
The current synagogue at 4 Speedwell Road is located adjacent to the site of the former Pershore Road building, now an agreed care facility. Services began in August 2013. By September, the new ark was installed in time for the High Holy Days. The new Chief Rabbi Ephraim Mirvis consecrated the new building by unveiling a plaque on Sunday 13 October 2013.

Rabbi Chanan Atlas was appointed minister of the shul in early 2012 taking over from Rabbi Shlomo Odze. Rabbi Atlas and his family left Birmingham, to take up a new position in Manchester. In May 2015 he was replaced by Rabbi Dr Lior Kaminetsky, who along with his family stayed for four years until May 2019.

Rabbi Yossi Hambling was appointed rabbi from July 2021. The Induction of Rabbi Hambling took place in March 2022 by the Chief Rabbi.

== Gallery ==
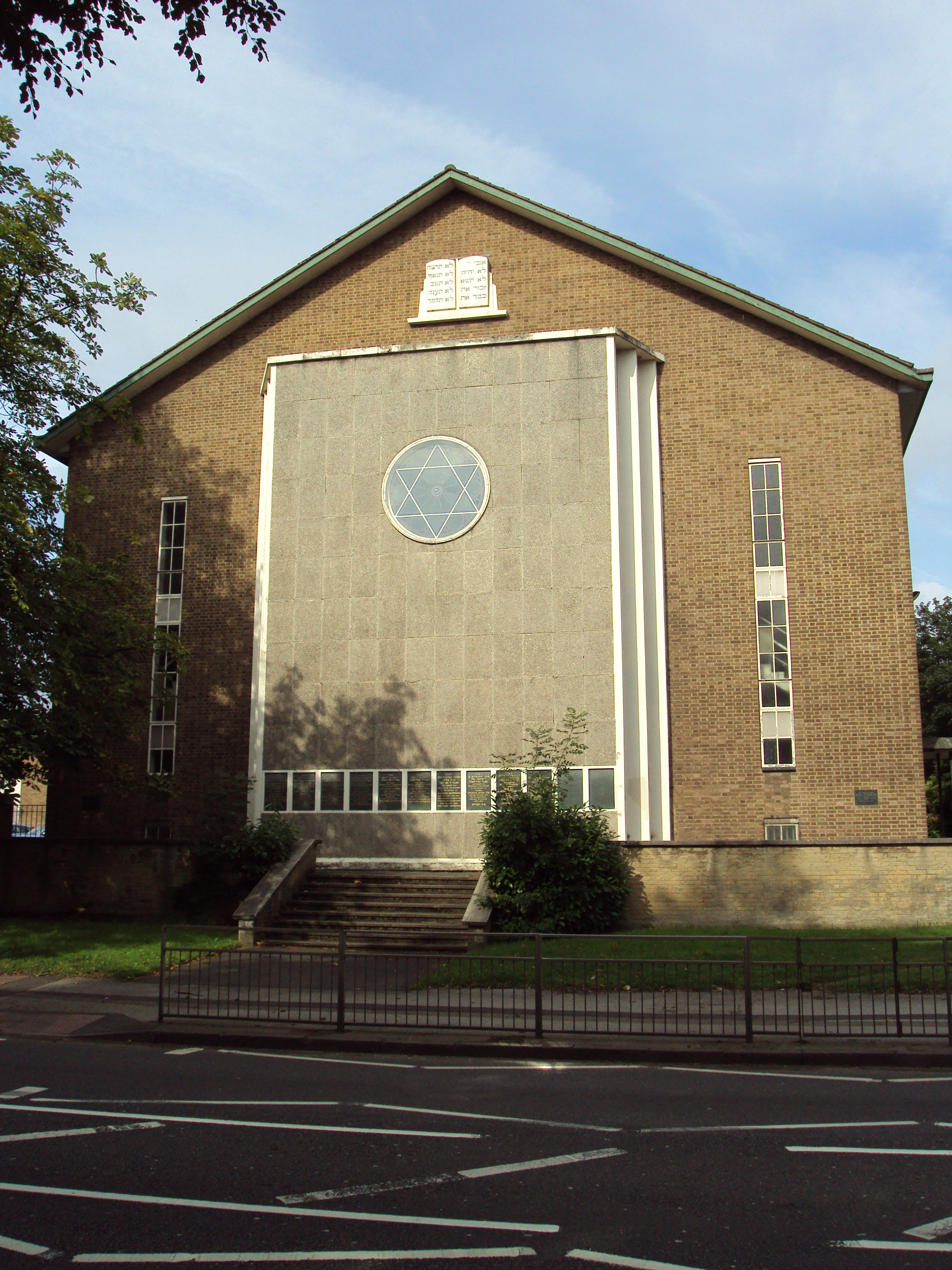
The former synagogue building in October 2023, during its demolition

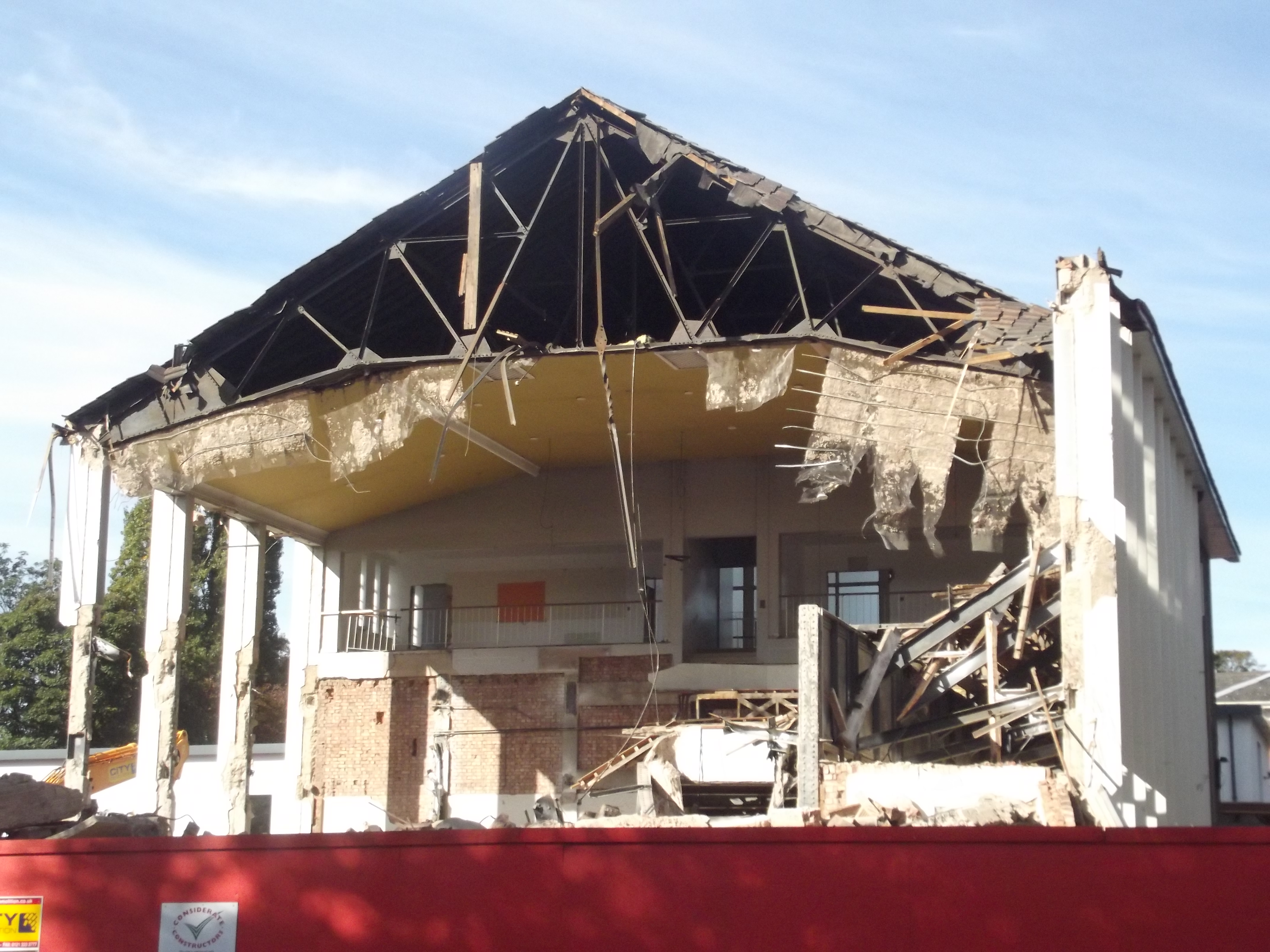
Demolition of the old synagogue in October 2013

== See also ==
- History of the Jews in England
- List of Jewish communities in the United Kingdom
- List of synagogues in the United Kingdom
