= Sha'arei Shalom =

Reform Jewish congregation

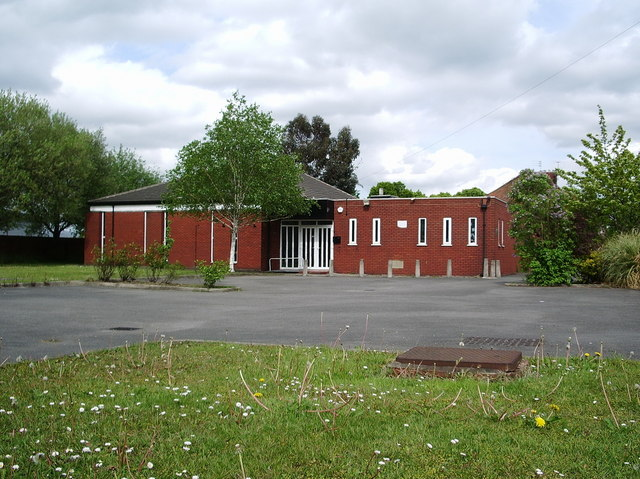
- The synagogue in 2007

- The location of the synagogue in Greater Manchester

Religion
- Affiliation: Progressive
- Ecclesiastical or organizational status: Synagogue
- Status: Active

Location
- Location: Elms Street, Whitefield, Borough of Bury, Greater Manchester, England M45 8GQ
- Country: United Kingdom
- Interactive map of Sha'arei Shalom
- Coordinates: 53°33′10″N 2°17′43″W

Architecture
- Established: 1977 (as a congregation)
- Completed: 1980

Website
- shaareishalom-mcr.co.uk

Sha'arei Shalom ("Gates of Peace") is a Progressive Jewish congregation and synagogue, located at Elms Street, Whitefield, in the Metropolitan Borough of Bury, Greater Manchester, England, in the United Kingdom.

The congregation was established in 1977 as the North Manchester Reform Congregation.

Discussions took place in 2022 between Sha'arei Shalom and Manchester Reform Synagogue about a possible merger of the two congregations. As of February 2026, the congregations remain separate.

== See also ==
- History of the Jews in England
- List of Jewish communities in the United Kingdom
- List of synagogues in the United Kingdom
