= List of Orthodox Jewish communities in the United Kingdom =

These geographical communities in the United Kingdom contain significant Orthodox Jewish populations.

== In Greater London ==
- Borehamwood
- Barnet
- Edgware
- Gants Hill
- Golders Green
- Hendon
- Mill Hill
- St John's Wood
- South Tottenham
- Stamford Hill
- Woodside Park
- Canvey Island
- Westcliffe

== In Greater Manchester ==
- Broughton
- Sedgley Park

== Elsewhere ==
- Edgbaston, Birmingham
- Gateshead, Tyne and Wear
- Alwoodley, Leeds
