= List of Reform synagogues =

This is a list of Reform synagogues around the world. Reform/Progressive synagogues are affiliated with organizations that are part of the World Union for Progressive Judaism. In the United States and Canada, Reform synagogues are affiliated with the Union for Reform Judaism. In Israel, Reform synagogues are affiliated with the Israel Movement for Reform and Progressive Judaism. Reform synagogues in Oceania and Asia are affiliated with the Union for Progressive Judaism.

== Austria ==
- Jewish Liberal Congregation – Or Chadasch, Vienna

== Bahamas ==
- Luis de Torres Synagogue, Freeport (defunct)

== Belarus ==
- Emuna, Vitebsk
- Hatikvah, Bobruisk
- Kadimah, Gomel
- Keshet, Mogilev
- Nefesh, Brest
- Shalom, Lida
- Sheket, Minsk
- Simha, Minsk
- Tamar, Minsk
- Thiya, Baranovichi

== Belgium ==
- Communaute Israelite Liberale de Belgique (Beth Hillel), Brussels
- The International Jewish Centre Brussels, Brussels

== Brazil ==
- Associação Cultural Israelita de Brasília (ACIB), Brasília
- Associação Israelita Catarinense, Florianópolis
- Associação Israelita Norte Paranaense – Beit Tikvá, Maringá
- Associação Religiosa Israelita (ARI), Rio de Janeiro
- Centro Israelita de Pernambuco (CIP), Recife
- Congregação Beth-El, São Paulo
- Congregação Israelita Capixaba (CICAPI), Vitória
- Congregação Israelita Mineira (CIM), Belo Horizonte
- Congregação Israelita Paulista, São Paulo
- Sociedade Israelita Brasileira de Cultura e Beneficência (SIBRA), Porto Alegre
- Sociedade Israelita do Ceará (SIC), Fortaleza

== Canada ==
=== Alberta ===
- Temple Beth Ora Congregation, Edmonton
- Temple B'nai Tikvah, Calgary

=== Manitoba ===
- Temple Shalom, Winnipeg

=== Quebec ===
- Temple Emanu-El-Beth Sholom, Montreal

== China ==
- Kehillat Beijing, Beijing
- Kehilat Shanghai, Shanghai

== Chile ==
- Comunidad Israelita de Concepción, Concepción
- Comunidad Religiosa y Cultural Ruaj Ami, Santiago
- Sociedad Israelita Max Nordau Valparaíso, Valparaíso

== Costa Rica ==
- Congregation B’nei Israel, San José

== Czech Republic ==
- Bejt Simcha, Prague
- Ec Chajim Praha, Prague
- ZLU – Hatikva, Prague

== Denmark ==
- Shir Hatzafon, Copenhagen

== Guatemala ==
- Asociacion Judía Reformista de Guatemala – Adat Israel, Guatemala City

== India ==
- Rodef Shalom, Mumbai

== Ireland ==
- Dublin Progressive Congregation, Dublin

== Israel ==
- Emet veShalom, Nahariya
- Poteach Shearim, Kiryat Shmona
- The Daniel Centers, Tel Aviv

== Jamaica ==
- Sha'are Shalom Synagogue, Kingston

== Japan ==
- Jewish Community of Japan, Tokyo

== Luxembourg ==
- Communaute Israelite D’Esch-sur-Alzette, Esch-sur-Alzette

== Netherlands ==
=== Aruba ===
- Beth Israel Synagogue, Oranjestad

== New Zealand ==
- Beth Shalom, Epsom
- Dunedin Jewish Congregation, Dunedin
- Temple Sinai, Wellington

== Norway ==
- Trondheim Synagogue, Trondheim

== Peru ==
- Comunidad Judía de Huánuco – Beith Etz Chaim, Huánuco

== Portugal ==
- Ohel Yaakov, Lisbon

== Singapore ==
- United Hebrew Congregation

== South Africa ==
- Beit Emanuel, Johannesburg
- Temple Israel (Cape Town)
- Temple Israel (Johannesburg)

== Spain ==
- Beit Emunah – Comunidad Judia del Asturias, Oviedo
- Comunidad Judía Bet Januká de Andalucía, Rota
- Comunidad Judía Bnei Israel de Galicia, Galicia
- Comunidad Judía de Valencia Bnei Sefarad, Valencia
- Comunitat Jueva Bet Shalom, Madrid
- Reform Jewish Community of Madrid, Madrid

== Switzerland ==
- Communauté Juive Libérale de Genève, Geneva
- Juedishe Liberale Gemeinde Or Chadash, Zürich
- Migwan – Liberale Jüdische Gemeinde Basel, Basel

== Thailand ==
- Thailand Progressive Jewish Community

== Ukraine ==
- Beit Em, Poltava
- Chesed Emuna, Vinnitsa
- Ha-Tikvah, Kyiv
- Haver, Cherkassy
- Korsun-Shevkenovski
- Kyrovograd, Kyrovograd
- Lutsk, Lutsk
- Shirat HaYam, Odesa
- Teiva, Lviv
- Zvenigorodka, Zvenigorodka

== United Kingdom ==
=== England ===
==== London ====
- Bromley Reform Synagogue
- Edgware & Hendon Reform Synagogue
- Finchley Reform Synagogue
- Hendon Reform Synagogue
- Harlow Jewish Community
- Kol Chai Hatch End Reform Jewish Community
- Mosaic Reform Synagogue
- North Western Reform Synagogue
- Sukkat Shalom Reform Synagogue
- West London Synagogue
- Westminster Synagogue
- The Wimbledon Synagogue

==== Elsewhere in England ====
- Beth Shalom Reform Synagogue (Cambridge)
- Blackpool Reform Jewish Congregation
- Bournemouth Reform Synagogue
- Bradford Synagogue
- Brighton and Hove Reform Synagogue
- Coventry Jewish Reform Community
- Darlington Hebrew Congregation
- Hull Reform Synagogue
- Isle of Wight Jewish Society
- Kehillat Kernow
- Liverpool Reform Synagogue
- Maidenhead Synagogue
- Manchester Reform Synagogue
- Menorah Synagogue
- Milton Keynes & District Reform Synagogue
- Newcastle Reform Synagogue
- North West Surrey Synagogue
- Radlett Reform Synagogue
- Sha'arei Shalom
- Sha'arei Tsedek North London Reform Synagogue
- Seven Hills Shul
- Sinai Synagogue (Leeds)
- South Hampshire Reform Jewish Community
- Oaks Lane Reform Synagogue
- Southend and District Reform Synagogue
- Southport & District Reform Synagogue
- Thanet & District Reform Synagogue
- Tikvah Chadasha
- Totnes Reform Jewish Group

=== Scotland ===
- Edinburgh Liberal Jewish Community, Edinburgh
- Glasgow Reform Synagogue

=== Wales ===
- Cardiff Reform Synagogue

== United States ==
=== Alaska ===
- Congregation Beth Sholom, Anchorage
- Congregation Or HaTzafon, Fairbanks
- Sukkat Shalom, Juneau

=== Arizona ===
- Beth Ami Temple, Temple Valley
- Congregation Beth HaMidbar, Yuma
- Congregation Beth Israel, Scottsdale
- Congregation M'Kor Hayim, Tucson
- Kol Ami, Tucson
- Temple Chai, Phoenix
- Temple Beth Shalom of the West Valley, Sun City
- Temple Emanuel, Tempe
- Temple Kol Ami, Scottsdale
- Temple Solel, Paradise Valley

=== Colorado ===
- B'nai Chaim, Denver
- Congregation B'nai Torah, Westminster
- Congregation Har Hashem, Boulder
- Temple Emanuel, Denver
- Temple Micah, Denver
- Temple Or Hadash, Fort Collins
- Temple Sinai, Denver

=== Hawaii ===
- Temple Emanu-El, Honolulu

=== Idaho ===
- Congregation Ahavath Beth Israel, Boise

=== Kansas ===
- Congregation Beth Torah, Overland Park
- Temple Beth Sholom, Topeka
- The Temple, Congregation B'nai Jehudah, Overland Park

=== Maine ===
- Congregation Bet Ha'am, Portland
- Congregation Beth El, Bangor
- Beth Israel Congregation, Bath

=== Maryland ===
- Baltimore Hebrew Congregation, Baltimore
- B'er Chayim Congregation, Cumberland
- Bet Aviv, Columbia
- Bolton Street Synagogue, Baltimore
- Congregation Kol Ami, Frederick
- Congregation B'nai Abraham, Hagerstown
- Congregation Or Chadash, Damascus
- Congregation Shaare Shalom, Waldorf
- Har Sinai-Oheb Shalom Congregation, Baltimore
- Temple Beth Ami, Rockville
- Temple Beth Shalom, Arnold
- Temple B'nai Israel, Easton
- Temple Emanuel, Kensington
- Temple Isaiah, Fulton
- Temple Shalom, Silver Spring
- Temple Solel, Bowie

=== Michigan ===
- Temple Israel, West Bloomfiled

=== Mississippi ===
- Anshe Chesed Congregation, Vicksburg
- Beth Israel Congregation, Jackson

=== Missouri ===
- Central Reform Congregation, St. Louis
- Congregation Shaare Emeth, St. Louis
- Temple Emanuel, St. Louis
- Temple Israel, St. Louis
- The New Reform Temple, Kansas City
- United Hebrew Congregation, St. Louis

=== New Hampshire ===
- Congregation Betenu, Amherst
- Etz Hayim Synagogue, Derry
- Temple Adath Yeshurun, Manchester
- Temple Beth Jacob, Concord
- Temple B'nai Israel, Laconia

=== New Mexico ===
- Temple Beth Shalom, Santa Fe

=== New York ===
- Congregation Emanu-El

=== North Dakota ===
- Temple Beth El, Fargo

=== Oregon ===
- Beit Haverim South Metro Jewish Congregation, West Linn
- Congregation Beth Israel, Portland
- Or haGan Jewish Community, Eugene

=== Pennsylvania ===
- Congregation Beth Or, Maple Glen

=== Puerto Rico ===
- Reform Jewish Congregation PR - Temple Beth Shalom, San Juan

=== Rhode Island ===
- Temple Beth-El, Providence
- Temple Habonim, Barrington
- Temple Sinai, Cranston

=== Utah ===
- Congregation Brith Sholem, Ogden
- Congregation Kol Ami, Salt Lake City
- Temple Har Shalom, Park City

=== Vermont ===
- Temple Beth Israel, Plattsburgh
- Temple Sinai, South Burlington

=== Virginia ===
- Beth El Congregation, Winchester
- Beth El Hebrew Congregation, Alexandria
- Beth Chaverim Reform Congregation, Ashburn
- Congregation Ner Shalom, Woodbridge
- Northern Virginia Hebrew Congregation, Reston
- Temple Beth Torah, Chantilly
- Temple B'nai Shalom, Fairfax Station
- Temple Rodef Shalom, Falls Church

=== Virgin Islands ===
- St. Thomas Synagogue, Charlotte Amalie

=== Washington ===
- Bet Chaverim, Des Moines
- Congregation Beth Hatikvah, Bremerton
- Congregation Emanu-El, Spokane
- Congregation Kol Ami, Vancouver
- Congregation Kol HaNeshamah, Seattle
- Congregation Kol Shalom, Bainbridge Island
- Kol Ami - A Center for Jewish Life, Kirkland
- Temple Beth El, Tacoma
- Temple Beth Israel, Aberdeen
- Temple Beth Or, Everett
- Temple B'nai Torah, Bellevue
- Temple De Hirsch Sinai, Seattle

=== Washington, D.C. ===
- Temple Micah
- Temple Sinai
- Washington Hebrew Congregation

=== West Virginia ===
- B'nai Sholom Congregation, Huntington
- Temple Israel, Charleston
- Temple Shalom, Wheeling

=== Wyoming ===
- Laramie Jewish Community Center, Laramie

== See also ==
- List of Conservative synagogues
- List of Humanistic synagogues
- List of Orthodox synagogues
- List of Reconstructionist synagogues
- List of synagogues
