= Barbara Borts =

American-born rabbi

Rabbi Dr Barbara Borts

Personal life
- Born: Barbara Marcy Borts; 1953 (age 72–73) Los Angeles, United States

Religious life
- Religion: Judaism
- Denomination: Reform Judaism (UK)

Jewish leader
- Synagogue: Darlington Hebrew Congregation
- Semikhah: 1981

Barbara Marcy Borts is an American-born Movement for Reform Judaism rabbi. She was one of the first women in Europe to be ordained as a rabbi and the first woman to have her own pulpit in a UK Reform Judaism synagogue.

== Early life ==
Barbara Borts was born in Los Angeles in 1953 to Natalie and Abe Borts. After graduating from University of California, Los Angeles, she moved to London, where she attended Leo Baeck College in London. She was ordained as a rabbi in 1981, at the same time as Rabbi Sybil Sheridan; they were two of the first women rabbis in Europe.

== Career ==
Barbara Borts took up posts as rabbi at Hampstead Reform Synagogue and at Mill Hill Reform Synagogue. From 1984 to 1990 she was rabbi at Radlett Reform Synagogue, the first woman rabbi to have a pulpit of her own in a UK Reform Judaism synagogue. After spending some time in North America, where she became the first female rabbi in Montreal and was one of the first religious leaders to conduct same-sex marriages in Ontario. While in Montreal, she earned an MA at McGill University in the field of Education, with a thesis on the education of converts to Judaism. Upon returning to England, she worked as part-time rabbi of Newcastle Reform Synagogue from 2008 to 2012 and later became part-time rabbi of a small Jewish community in Basel, Switzerland.

In 2014 she gained a doctorate in Jewish music from the University of Durham. As of 2017 she is taking services at Darlington Hebrew Congregation, where she is also providing rabbinical advice, and is trained as a chazzan.

== Social justice ==
In 2010 she and 51 other rabbis called for action to end the killing in the Congo.

In 2013, along with more than 200 Jews, she signed a statement drawn up by Jewish Socialist magazine, marking the 75th anniversary of Kristallnacht and slamming "the toxic sentiments expressed by many politicians and much of the media against migrants, asylum seekers, Gypsies and Travellers".

In December 2014, The Guardian published a letter signed by her and other UK rabbis, sharing the Archbishop of Canterbury's concerns about child poverty in Britain.

In 2024, Borts was a signatory to a letter from 30 rabbis defending civilians in Israel and Palestine, and in defence of Labour's backing of the International Criminal Court's request for arrest warrants against Israeli and Hamas leaders for alleged war crimes.

== Selected works ==
- "The Relationship Between Men and Women from a Jewish Perspective" in European Judaism, vol. 21, no. 1, Summer 1987, p. 3
- "Social Justice is God's Work" in The Jewish Quarterly, vols 35–36, 1988, p. 71
- "Lilith" in Sheridan, Sybil (ed.): Hear our voice: women rabbis tell their stories, London, SCM Press, 1994, p. 98
- "On Trespassing the Boundaries: A Reflection on Men, Women and Jewish Space" in Sheridan, Sybil (ed.): Hear our voice: women rabbis tell their stories, London, SCM Press, 1994, pp. 169–179
- "Repairing the World – a Task for Jews?" in Romain, Jonathan (ed.): Renewing The Vision – Rabbis Speak Out on Modern Jewish Issues, SCM Press, 1996, pp. 192–202 ISBN 0334026571
- "Haftarat Korach" in Goldstein, Elyse (ed.): The Women's Haftarah Commentary: New Insights from Women Rabbis on the 54 Weekly Haftarah Portions, the 5 Megillot & Special Shabbatot, Jewish Lights Publishing, 2004, p. 180 ISBN 9781580231336
- "Parashat Shelach Lecha": a sermon on what does it mean to 'have faith'? 12 June 2014, London: Leo Baeck College
- Mouths Filled with Song: British Reform Judaism Through the Lens of Its Music, Durham theses, University of Durham, 2014, 334 pp
- with Sarah, Elli Tikvah (eds): Women Rabbis in the Pulpit – A collection of sermons, Kulmus Publications, 2015

== See also ==
- Timeline of women rabbis
