= List of Conservative synagogues =

This is a list of Conservative synagogues around the world.

== Barbados ==
- Nidhe Israel Synagogue, Bridgetown

== Canada ==
=== Alberta ===
- Beth Shalom, Edmonton

=== British Columbia ===
- Beth Tikvah Congregation, Richmond
- Congregation Beth Israel, Vancouver
- Congregation Emanu-El, Victoria
- Congregation Har El, West Vancouver

=== New Brunswick ===
- Shaarei Zedek Congregation, Saint John

=== Newfoundland and Labrador ===
- Beth El Synagogue, St. John's

=== Nova Scotia ===
- Shaar Shalom Synagogue, Halifax
- Temple Sons of Israel, Sydney

=== Ontario ===
- Congregation B'nai Israel, St. Catharines

=== Quebec ===
- Congregation Beth El, Mount Royal
- Shaar Shalom, Laval, Quebec
- Shaare Zion Beth-El Congregation, Montreal

=== Saskatchewan ===
- Congregation Agudas Israel, Saskatoon

== Colombia ==
- Circulo Israelita del Caribe, Barranquilla

== Cuba ==
- Beth Shalom Temple, Havana
- Communidad Hebrea Hatikva, Santiago de Cuba

== Israel ==
- Moreshet Yisrael at the Fuchsberg Center, Jerusalem

== Mexico ==
- Comunidad Bet El de Mexico, Mexico City
- Comunidad Hebrea En San Miguel de Allende, San Miguel de Allende

== United States ==
=== Alabama ===
- Agudath Israel - Etz Ahayem Synagogue, Montgomery
- Temple Beth-El, Birmingham

=== Arkansas ===
- Congregation Agudath Achim, Little Rock

=== Arizona ===
- Beth El Congregation, Phoenix
- Congregation Anshei Israel, Tucson
- Congregation Or Tzion, Scottsdale
- Temple Beth Sholom of the East Valley, Chandler

=== Connecticut ===
- Beth El Temple
- Emanuel synagogue
- B'nai Tikvah Shalom

=== Colorado ===
- Congregation Bonai Shalom, Boulder
- Congregation Rodef Shalom, Denver
- Hebrew Education Alliance, Denver

=== Delaware ===
- Beth Shalom, Wilmington
- Congregation Beth Sholom, Dover

=== Georgia ===
- Ahavath Achim Synagogue, Atlanta
- Congregation Beth Shalom, Atlanta
- Congregation B’nai Torah, Sandy Springs
- Congregation Etz Chaim, Marietta
- Congregation Or Hadash, Sandy Springs
- Congregation Sha’arey Israel, Macon
- Congregation Shearith Israel, Atlanta

=== Hawaii ===
- Sof Ma'arav, Honolulu

=== Iowa ===
- Agudas Achim Congregation, Coralville
- Tifereth Israel Synagogue, Des Moines

=== Kansas ===
- Ahavat Achim Hebrew Congregation, Wichita
- Congregation Beth Shalom, Overland Park

=== Maine ===
- Congregation Beth Israel, Bangor
- Temple Beth El, Portland

=== Maryland ===
- Beth Am Synagogue, Baltimore
- Beth El Congregation, Pikesville
- Beth Israel Congregation, Salisbury
- Beth Shalom Congregation, Columbia
- Beth Sholom, Frederick
- B'nai Israel, Rockville
- B'Nai Shalom, Olney
- Chevrei Tzedek Congregation, Baltimore
- Chizuk Amuno Congregation, Baltimore
- Congregation Beth El, Bethesda
- Congregation B'nai Tzedek, Potomac
- Congregation Har Shalom, Potomac
- Congregation Kol Shalom, Annapolis
- Congregation Shaare Tikvah, Waldorf
- Har Tzeon-Agudath Achim Congregation, Silver Spring
- Kehilat Shalom, Gaithersburg
- Mishkan Torah Synagogue, Greenbelt
- Ohr Kodesh, Chevy Chase
- Shaare Tefila Congregation, Olney
- Shaare Torah, Gaithersburg
- Temple Israel, Silver Spring (defunct, merged into Tikvat Israel)
- Tikvat Israel Congregation, Rockville

=== Nebraska ===
- Beth El Synagogue, Omaha
- Congregation Tifereth Israel, Lincoln

=== Nevada ===
- Midbar Kodesh Temple, Henderson
- Temple Beth Sholom, Las Vegas
- Temple Emanu-El, Reno

=== New Hampshire ===
- Temple Israel, Manchester
- Temple Israel, Portsmouth

=== Oklahoma ===
- Emanuel Synagogue, Oklahoma City

=== Oregon ===
- Congregation Neveh Shalom, Portland
- Congregation Shaarie Torah, Portland

=== Pennsylvania ===
- Adath Israel, Merion Station
- Agudas Israel, Hazleton
- Beth El Congregation, Pittsburgh
- Beth El Temple, Harrisburg
- Beth Sholom Congregation, Elkins Park
- Beth Tikvah B’nai Jeshurun, Erdenheim
- B’nai Abraham, Easton
- B'nai Jacob Synagogue, Middletown
- Chisuk Emuna Congregation, Harrisburg
- Congregation Adath Jeshurun, Elkins Park
- Congregation Beth Am Israel, Penn Valley
- Congregation Beth El, Yardley
- Congregation Beth Shalom, Pittsburgh
- Congregation B’nai Jacob, Phoenixville
- Congregation Brith Sholom, Bethlehem
- Congregation Ohev Shalom, Wallingford
- Congregation Or Shalom, Berwyn
- Germantown Jewish Centre, Philadelphia
- Har Zion Temple, Penn Valley
- Kesher Zion Synagogue, Wyomissing
- Temple Beth El, Allentown
- Temple Beth El, Lancaster
- Temple Beth Hillel-Beth El, Wynnewood
- Temple Beth Zion-Beth Israel, Philadelphia
- Temple Israel, Scranton
- Temple Israel, Wilkes-Barre
- Temple Israel of the Poconos, Stroudsburg
- Temple Sinai, Dresher
- Tiferet Bet Israel, Blue Bell
- Tree of Life - Or L'Simcha Congregation, Pittsburgh

=== Puerto Rico ===
- Shaare Zedeck Synagogue JCC, San Juan

=== Rhode Island ===
- Congregation B'nai Israel, Woonsocket
- Temple Emanu-El, Providence
- Temple Torat Yisrael, East Greenwich

=== South Dakota ===
- Congregation B'Nai Isaac, Aberdeen

=== Utah ===
- Congregation Kol Ami, Salt Lake City

=== Vermont ===
- Ohavi Zedek Synagogue, Burlington
- Rutland Jewish Center, Rutland

=== Washington ===
- B'nai Torah, Olympia
- Congregation Beth Shalom, Seattle
- Congregation Beth Sholom, Richland
- Herzl-Ner Tamid, Mercer Island
- Temple Beth Shalom, Spokane

=== Washington, D.C. ===
- Adas Israel Congregation
- Tifereth Israel Congregation

=== West Virginia ===
- B'nai Sholom Congregation, Huntington
- Congregation B'nai Jacob, Charleston

Minnesota

- Adath Jeshurun Congregation, Minnetonka
- Beth El Synagogue, Saint Louis Park
- Beth Jacob Congregation, Mendota Heights
- Shaare Shalom Congregation, Mendoka Heights
- Temple Of Aaron, Saint Paul

== See also ==
- List of Humanistic synagogues
- List of Orthodox synagogues
- List of Reform synagogues
- List of Reconstructionist synagogues
- List of synagogues
