= List of Reconstructionist synagogues =

This is a list of Reconstructionist synagogues and chavurot around the world.

== Brazil ==
- União Israelita Sefaradita Ijuí, Ijuí

== Canada ==
- Congregation Darchei Noam, Toronto, Ontario
- Congregation Dorshei Emet, Hampstead, Quebec
- Or Haneshamah, Ottawa, Ontario

== Curaçao ==
- United Congregation Mikvé Israel-Emanuel, Willemstad

== Germany ==
- Jüdische Gemeinde Michelsberg (Jewish Community of Michelsberg), Wiesbaden

== Italy ==
- Sinagoga Ner Tamid del Sud, Serrastretta

== Netherlands ==
- Klal Israel, Delft

== United States ==
=== California ===
- Congregation Dor Hadash, San Diego
- Keddem Congregation, Palo Alto
- Kehillat Israel, Pacific Palisades
- Malibu Jewish Center and Synagogue, Malibu
- Ner Shalom, Cotati
- Or Shalom Jewish Community, San Francisco
- Or Zaruah Havurah, Oakland
- University Synagogue, Irvine

=== Colorado ===
- B’nai Havurah – Denver Jewish Reconstructionist Congregation, Denver
- Congregation Beth Evergreen, Evergreen

=== Connecticut ===
- Temple B’nai Israel, Willimantic

=== Delaware ===
- Temple Beth El, Newark

=== Florida ===
- Kol Ami, Boca Raton

=== Georgia ===
- Congregation Bet Haverim, Atlanta

=== Indiana ===
- Congregation Beth-El Zedeck, Indianapolis

=== Illinois ===
- Ezra Habonim, The Niles Township Jewish Congregation, Skokie
- Jewish Reconstructionist Congregation, Evanston
- Shir Hadash Synagogue, Wheeling

=== Maryland ===
- Adat Shalom Reconstructionist Congregation, Bethesda
- Beit Tikvah, Baltimore
- Columbia Jewish Congregation, Columbia
- Kol HaLev, Baltimore
- Congregation Mishkan Torah, Greenbelt
- Oseh Shalom, Laurel

=== Massachusetts ===
- Congregation Agudas Achim, Attleboro
- Congregation Dorshei Tzedek, West Newton
- Jewish Community of Amherst, Amherst
- Congregation Ahavath Sholom, Great Barrington
- Havurat Shalom, Andover
- Temple Hillel B’nai Torah, West Roxbury
- Congregation Shirat Hayam, Duxbury
- Shir Hadash, Newton Highlands
- Temple Emmanuel of Wakefield, Wakefield

=== Michigan ===
- Ann Arbor Reconstructionist Congregation, Ann Arbor
- Kehillat Israel
- Reconstructionist Congregation of Detroit, Detroit
- Congregation T’Chiyah, Ferndale

=== Minnesota ===
- Mayim Rabim Congregation, Minneapolis
- Temple Israel, Duluth

=== Missouri ===
- Shir Hadash Reconstructionist Community, St. Louis

=== New Hampshire ===
- Congregation Ahavas Achim, Keene

=== New Jersey ===
- Bnai Keshet, Montclair
- Temple B’nai Abraham, Bordentown
- Congregation Beth Hatikvah, Summit
- Reconstructionist Congregation Beth Israel, Ridgewood
- Congregation Kehilat Shalom, Belle Mead
- String of Pearls/Princeton Reconstructionist Synagogue, Princeton
- Nafshenu, Marlton

=== New York ===
- Bet Am Shalom Synagogue, White Plains
- Kehillath Shalom, Cold Spring Harbor
- Mishkan Ha’am – A Reconstructionist Community, Hastings-on-Hudson
- Central Synagogue-Beth Emeth, Rockville Centre
- Reconstructionist Synagogue of the North Shore, Plandome
- SAJ – Judaism that Stands for All, New York City
- Congregation Shir Shalom, Williamsville
- West End Synagogue, New York City

=== North Carolina ===
- Havurat Tikvah, Charlotte
- Kehillah Synagogue, Chapel Hill

=== Ohio ===
- Knesseth Israel Temple, Wooster
- Kol HaLev, Cleveland's Reconstructionist Jewish Community, University Heights
- Kehilat Sukkat Shalom, Columbus

=== Oregon ===
- Havurah Shalom, Portland
- Temple Beth Israel, Eugene
- Temple Beth Sholom, Salem
- Temple Emek Shalom, Ashland
- Jewish Community of Central Oregon, Congregation Shalom Bayit, Bend

=== Pennsylvania ===
- Congregation Am Haskalah, Bethlehem
- Congregation Beth Israel, Media
- Congregation Dor Hadash
- Minyan Dorshei Derekh, Philadelphia
- Kehilat HaNahar, New Hope
- Congregation Kol Emet, Yardley
- Kol Tzedek, Philadelphia
- Leyv Ha-Ir, Philadelphia
- Mishkan Shalom, Philadelphia
- Or Hadash, Fort Washington
- Congregation Shireinu, Gladwyne
- Beth Shalom, Mechanicsburg

=== Texas ===
- Congregation Beth Am, San Antonio
- Congregation Shalom Rav, Austin

=== Utah ===
- Chavurah B’Yachad, Salt Lake City

=== Vermont ===
- Congregation Beth El, Bennington

=== Virginia ===
- Kol Ami the Northern Virginia Reconstructionist Community, Annandale

=== Washington ===
- Temple Beth Hatfiloh, Olympia
- Kadima, Seattle

=== Wisconsin ===
- Shaarei Shamayim, Madison
- Congregation Shir Hadash, Milwaukee

== See also ==
- List of Conservative synagogues
- List of Humanistic synagogues
- List of Orthodox synagogues
- List of Reform synagogues
- List of synagogues
