= Hatikvah (disambiguation) =

Hatikvah (Hebrew: הַתִּקְוָה [hatikˈva]; lit. 'The Hope') is the national anthem of the State of Israel.

Hatikvah or Hatikva may also refer to:

- Camp Hatkvah of the Canadian Young Judaea movement, Canada
- HaTikva (political party)
- Hatikva Quarter, neighbourhood of Tel Aviv
- Hatikva 6, Israeli reggae band
- Hatikvah Synagogue, Cuba
- Isaac Asir HaTikvah (died 1377), Ashkenazi Rabbinic leader
- SS HaTikva, Jewish illegal immigrants' ship
