= Richard Marienstras =

French anglicist

Richard Marienstras (18 January 1928 – 22 February 2011) was a French anglicist and France's foremost expert on Shakespeare.

== Life ==
Marienstras was born in Warsaw to a middle-class Polish-Jewish family. His parents divorced when he was three years old, and his mother took him abroad, travelling around Italy until they settled on the Riviera. He grew up bilingual in Polish and French and studied at the Lycée Janson-de-Sailly in Paris, until the war. Moving to the unoccupied southeastern part of Vichy France, he was called up prematurely, aged 15, to work in the Service du travail obligatoire (STO) whereupon he fled to Vercours where, the only intellectual in his group, he joined the French Resistance.

At war's end, he worked for three years assisting Holocaust survivors to find asylum, learning that his father had been one of the victims. In 1948 he went to the newly established state of Israel where he fought in the Arab-Israeli war, only to return soon after the cessation of hostilities with a sense of disillusionment, and rejoined his family in a pension on Rue Saint-Jacques. His friendship with the future novelist André Schwarz-Bart dates to this period.

He taught himself English and with his wife Elise, a young historian who also was of Polish-Jewish background, moved to Habib Bourguiba's Tunis in 1957, which by then had gained its independence. There he spent four years teaching French in secondary schools and earned his agrégation certificate. He then taught in the United States for two years (1961-1963). On his return to France he was given a position to teach at the Sorbonne. When the general strike of May 1968 broke out, Marienstras supported the students, even helping them raise barricades on Rue Monsieur-le-Prince. When Edgar Faure's reform split up Paris University into 13 different branches, Marienstras was responsible for creating the anglophone branch of the UFR (Unité de Formation et de Recherche), and thereafter served as professor of English at Paris Diderot University.

He thought of Jews as a "diaspora people." (peuple en diaspora) In 1967, together with Pierre Vidal-Naquet, Marienstras founded Le Cercle Gaston-Crémieux whose purpose, according to Sylvain Cypel, was the promotion of Jewish life in the diaspora without its being "feudalised" by either the synagogue or Zionism. Marienstras was a staunch advocate for the preservation of Yiddish and its culture.

== Work on Shakespeare ==
His life work was deeply inflected by his experiences of World War Two, which caused him to reflect on the problem of survival in the wake of catastrophe. The resonance of the Shoah's incinerated victims can be sensed throughout Marienstras's analysis in his masterpiece, The Near and the Far (Le Proche et le Lointain), (Note: Translated rather vapidly, Richard Wilson argues, in the 1985 version put out by the Cambridge University Press, bearing the title New Perspectives on the Shakespearean World. (Wilson 2016, p. 20)) of the imagery of sacrificial carnage, of smoking corpses, in Shakespeare's plays, and the "natural stench" imputed to Jews by many of Shakespeare's contemporaries such as Sir Thomas Browne.

In his posthumously published Shakespeare and the world's disorder, the culmination of almost half a century of critical attention to Shakespeare's works, Marienstras analysed the patterns of political disintegration – marked by the arbitrariness of power, the legitimization of violence and the eclipse of the sacred – and "ontological erosion" he considered to lie at the heart of Shakespearean tragedy. He argued that even in the comedies, where tensions are finally resolved harmoniously, one cannot but sense that the reconciliations remain precarious.

== Sources ==
- Catinchi, Philippe-Jean (10 March 2011). "Richard Marienstras, angliciste". Le Monde (in French).
- Cypel, Sylvain (2020). L'Etat d'Israël contre les Juifs [The State of Israel against the Jews] (in French). La Découverte. ISBN 978-2-348-04344-4.
- Flohr, Paul (Winter 1975–1976). "Responses to "The Jews of the Diaspora or the Vocation of a Minority"". European Judaism: A Journal for the New Europe. 10 (1): 3–4.
- Hobsbawm, Eric (2007). Interesting Times: A Twentieth-Century Life. Knopf Doubleday Publishing Group. ISBN 978-0-307-42641-3.
- Marienstras, Richard (Summer 1975). "The Jews of the Diaspora, or the Vocation of a Minority". European Judaism: A Journal for the New Europe. 9 (2): 6–22. JSTOR 41444253.
- Marienstras, Richard (1981). Le Proche et le Lointain: Le drame élisabéthain et l'idéologie anglaise aux XV1' et XVII' siècles [The Near and the Far: Elizabethan drama and English ideology in the 16th and 17th centuries] (in French). Les Éditions de Minuit. ISBN 978-2-707-30584-8.
- Marienstras, Richard (1985). New Perspectives on the Shakespearean World. Cambridge University Press. ISBN 978-0-521-25265-2.
- Marienstras, Richard (2012). Goy-Blanquet, Dominique; Marienstras, Élise (eds.). Shakespeare et le désordre du monde [Shakespeare and the world's disorder] (in French). Gallimard. ISBN 978-0-521-25265-2.
- Marienstras, Richard; Vidal-Naquet, Pierre (1975). Mosaïques: Être un peuple en diaspora (in French). Cahiers libres.
- Sansonetti, Laetitia (February 2013). "Review: Shakespeare et le désordre du monde". Esprit (in French). 392 (2): 141–142. JSTOR 24274742.
- Wilson, Richard (2016). ""Smoke like incense": sacrifice, Shakespeare and the Shoah". Shakespeare. 12 (1): 20–32. doi:10.1080/17450918.2013.850111. S2CID 192042908.
