= Charles Berg =

Charles Berg may refer to:

- Charles Berg (rabbi) (1911–1979), the first non-Orthodox rabbi to be ordained in England
- Charles A. Berg (1927–2014), American farmer and politician
- Charles Arthur Berg (born 1970), American film producer and actor
