= Sybil Sheridan =

British Reform rabbi and writer

Rabbi Sybil Sheridan

Personal life
- Born: 27 September 1953 (age 72)
- Spouse: Rabbi Jonathan Romain
- Children: Four

Religious life
- Religion: Judaism
- Denomination: Reform Judaism (UK)

Jewish leader
- Position: Rabbi
- Organisation: Rabbi at Newcastle Reform Synagogue; Rabbi at West London Synagogue (2014–20); Chair of the Assembly of Reform Rabbis, Movement for Reform Judaism (UK) (2013–15); Rabbi at Wimbledon and District Synagogue (2003–14)
- Semikhah: 1981

Sybil Ann Sheridan (born 27 September 1953) is a writer and British Reform rabbi. She was chair of the Assembly of Reform Rabbis UK at the Movement for Reform Judaism from 2013 to 2015 and was Rabbi at Wimbledon and District Synagogue in south west London. As of 2020 she is part-time rabbi at Newcastle Reform Synagogue.

Sybil Sheridan has edited two books and contributed to several academic publications. She is a major contributor to interfaith dialogue, both nationally and internationally, and has a particular interest in Jewish-Muslim dialogue and especially between women. She co-chaired the Home Office International Conference for Women in Judaism and Islam.

She has strong links to Israel and to the educational festival Limmud. She has lectured at Leo Baeck College and the Muslim College, London. She is on the International Editorial Advisory Board of Nashim: A Journal of Jewish Women's Studies & Gender Issues published by Indiana University Press. For eight years she was Jewish chaplain at the University of Roehampton.

== Early years ==
A child of German-Jewish refugees, she grew up in Bolton, Lancashire, a member of Manchester Reform Synagogue. She attended Bolton School and read theology and religious studies at Girton College, Cambridge, being one of the first two Jews to study the subject at Cambridge University (the other being Walter Rothschild). She then studied at Leo Baeck College and at the Pardes Institute in Jerusalem, and was ordained as a rabbi in 1981, one of the first women in Europe in the role.

== Career ==
After four years at Ealing Liberal Synagogue, she took extended maternity leave, during which time she wrote a book of children's stories, lectured at Leo Baeck College, and worked with the Swindon Jewish Community. In 1994 Rabbi Sheridan became Rabbi of the Thames Valley Jewish Community (now known as the Reading Liberal Jewish Community) and remained there until her appointment as Rabbi of Wimbledon and District Synagogue. She job shared with Rabbi Sylvia Rothschild in that post from 2003 until early 2014. In 2014 she became Rabbi at West London Synagogue.

In 2011 she produced, with Cantor Zoe Jacobs of Finchley Reform Synagogue, what is thought to be the first major new collection of synagogue music published in the UK for nearly a century. Shirei Ha-t'fillah (Songs of Prayer), a compilation of sheet music and explanatory articles, was published by the Movement for Reform Judaism.

As of 2020 she is part-time rabbi at Newcastle Reform Synagogue.

== Social justice ==
Sybil Sheridan has made several visits to Ethiopia to find out about and support the Jews in Gondar. She was inspired by her visit to set up a new charity, Meketa (Amharic for protection or support), after seeing at first hand the poverty and lack of resources available.

In February 2013 she was one of a group of Christian, Jewish, Muslim and Sikh leaders who met at Parliament to urge MPs to support a radical overhaul of the financial system including debt cancellation for the most indebted countries, more progressive taxation and an end to harmful lending.

== Personal life ==
She is married to Jonathan Romain, Rabbi of Maidenhead Synagogue, and they have four adult sons.

== Publications ==
=== Books ===
- Sybil Sheridan: "Abraham from a Jewish Perspective" in Norman Solomon, Richard Harries, Timothy Winter (eds): Abraham's Children: Jews, Christians and Muslims in Conversation, pp. 9–17, London and New York: T & T Clark, 2005. ISBN 0-567-08171-0 (hardback); ISBN 0-567-08161-3 (paperback)
- Stephen Bigger: Creating the Old Testament: The Emergence of the Hebrew Bible, Basil Blackwell, 1989. ISBN 978-0-631-16249-0. Sheridan contributed two chapters
- Sybil Sheridan (ed.): Hear our voice: women in the British rabbinate, Studies in Comparative Religion series. Paperback, 1st North American edition. Columbia, South Carolina: University of South Carolina Press, 1998. ISBN 1-57003-088-X
- Sybil Sheridan (ed.): Hear our voice: women rabbis tell their stories. Paperback, 203 pages. London: SCM Press, 1994. ISBN 0-334-02583-4
- Sylvia Rothschild and Sybil Sheridan (eds.): Taking Up the Timbrel: The Challenge of Creating Ritual for Jewish Women Today. London: SCM Press, 2000
- Sybil Sheridan: "Human Nature and Destiny" in Seth Daniel Kunin (ed): Themes and Issues in Judaism, World Religions: Themes and Issues, pp. 166–191. New York: Cassell, 2000. ISBN 0-304-33757-9 (hardback); ISBN 0-304-33758-7 (paperback)

==== For young people ====
- Sybil Sheridan, illustrated by Olivia Rayner: Jewish World, Stories from the Religious World series. Paperback, 48 pages. Silver Burdett, 1987. ISBN 978-0-382-09312-8. The stories include recent historical experience in the Holocaust

=== Journal articles and lectures ===
- Sybil Sheridan: "Are We Prisoners of Our History?" in European Judaism, volume 28, no. 2, Autumn 1995, pp. 68–72. Berghahn Books Inc. ISSN 0014-3006
- Sybil Sheridan: "History of Women in the Rabbinate: A Communal Case of Amnesia". Lecture delivered at BET DEBORA – European Conference of Women Rabbis, Cantors, Scholars and all Spiritually Interested Jewish Women and Men, Berlin, May 1999
- Sybil Sheridan: "My first day at Leo Baeck College" in European Judaism, 39, no.1, Spring 2006, pp. 69–70. Berghahn Books Inc. ISSN 0014-3006
- Sybil Sheridan: "Aliza Lavie Tefillat Nashim: Jewish Women's Prayers Throughout The Ages (Book review)", Nashim: A Journal of Jewish Women's Studies and Gender Issues, no.15, Spring 2008, p. 212. Indiana University Press. ISSN 0793-8934

=== Newspaper articles ===
- Sybil Sheridan: "What future for the Jews left in Ethiopia?", The Jewish Chronicle, 10 June 2009
- Sybil Sheridan: "We must not abandon the Jews left in Ethiopia", The Jewish Chronicle, 26 January 2014

=== Podcasts ===
- Stefanie Sinclair: Regina Jonas: the first female rabbi, Open University, 2013. Includes an interview with Sybil Sheridan
