= Sylvia Rothschild =

British Reform rabbi (born 1957)

Rabbi Sylvia Rothschild

Personal life
- Born: 21 November 1957 (age 68) England
- Spouse: Martin Fischer

Religious life
- Religion: Judaism
- Denomination: Reform Judaism

Jewish leader
- Position: Rabbi
- Synagogue: Lev Chadash (2016 – present); Wimbledon and District Synagogue (2003–2014); Bromley Reform Synagogue (1987–2002)

Sylvia Rothschild (born 21 November 1957) is a British Reform rabbi. Together with Rabbi Sybil Sheridan, she was Rabbi of Wimbledon and District Synagogue in south west London, from 2003 to 2014, in the first ever rabbinic job share in England. She was Rabbi of Bromley Reform Synagogue from 1987 to 2002, and is currently the Rabbi at Lev Chadash in Milan.

== Early life ==
Sylvia was born in Bradford to Edgar and Esther Rothschild. Her father had come from Hannover, Germany via Baden-Baden to England in 1938 as a teenager.

== Professional career ==
After completing a psychology degree at Manchester University she worked for a mental health charity in a therapeutic community, and for a London borough in adult psychiatric care. She was ordained as a rabbi in 1987 by the Leo Baeck College and has worked as a community rabbi ever since. She was Chair of the Assembly of Rabbis at the Reform Synagogues of Great Britain (now the Movement for Reform Judaism) from 1998 to 2003.

Rothschild was a lay member of the Bromley Research Ethics Committee for many years, and is an Appointed Member of the Standards Committee for the London Borough of Bromley as well as an Appointed Member of the National Information Governance Board for Health and Social Care.

She is also a trained counsellor and has trained as an executive coach.

She has spoken out against the suppression of women's voices on religious matters in Israel and restrictions on the right of women to pray at the Western Wall.

She is a member of the Steering Team of Tzelem, a cross-communal clerical activist organisation campaigning on broad social issues such as the UK government's response to the Syrian Refugee Crisis.

=== Writings ===
Rothschild has written extensively on ethical issues, as well as on prayer and on new liturgies. She is known for her creation of a large number of new rituals and prayers for life events, mainly though not exclusively to mark events in women's lives. She has also written liturgies to help with end of life experiences.

She answered questions on the website of TotallyJewish.com for some years, has been one of the contributors to the Parashat haShavua column for The Jewish Chronicle and frequently contributes to Jewish News.

== Personal life ==
She is married and has three children, and one dog.

== Bibliography ==
=== Books ===
- Sylvia Rothschild and Sybil Sheridan (eds.): Taking Up the Timbrel: The Challenge of Creating Ritual for Jewish Women Today. London: SCM Press, 2000. Includes Sylvia Rothschild: "Terminating a Pregnancy", "After the Termination of a Pregnancy" and "Beginning a Religious Response to Mastectomy"

=== Articles ===
- Sylvia Rothschild: "Why women should be able to pray in peace", The Jewish Chronicle, 22 April 2010
- Sylvia Rothschild: "Why I held a funeral for a stillborn child", The Jewish Chronicle, 27 October 2011
- Sylvia Rothschild: "The JNF must go back to its roots", The Jewish Chronicle, 24 May 2012
- Sylvia Rothschild: "Sweet voices and sour fanatics", The Jewish Chronicle, 5 November 2012
- Sylvia Rothschild: "Reform Judaism and organ donation", Movement for Reform Judaism, 18 July 2013
- Sylvia Rothschild: "Progressively Speaking: Responding to domestic abuse", Times of Israel, 16 March 2017
- Sylvia Rothschild: "Trump's Jerusalem decision may extinguish hope in the Middle East", The Spectator, 6 December 2017
- Sylvia Rothschild: "It's Hannukah: why have one day when you can have eight?", The Evening Standard, 12 December 2017
- Sylvia Rothschild: "Does religion encourage or help to prevent the use of violence?", The Jewish Chronicle, 3 January 2019

=== Book reviews ===
- Sylvia Rothschild: "A wise choice for Bible readers" book review of Robert Alter: The Wisdom Books: Job, Proverbs, and Ecclesiastes: a translation with commentary, W.W. Norton, The Jewish Chronicle, 12 May 2011
- Sylvia Rothschild: "What does the Bible say?" book review of Richard Elliott Friedman and Shawna Dolansky: The Bible Now, Oxford University Press, The Jewish Chronicle, 6 July 2012
- Sylvia Rothschild: "Meeting points for Abraham's children" book review of Tony Bayfield, Alan Race and Ataullah Siddiqui (eds.): Beyond the Dysfunctional Family – Jews, Christians and Muslims in Dialogue with Muslims in Dialogue with Each Other and With Britain, The Manor House Abrahamic Dialogue Group, The Jewish Chronicle, 30 November 2012
- Sylvia Rothschild: "Little room for Europe" book review of Judith R. Baskin (ed.): The Cambridge Dictionary of Judaism and Jewish Culture, Cambridge University Press, The Jewish Chronicle, 27 December 2012
