= List of Orthodox synagogues =

This is a list of Orthodox synagogues around the world. In the United States and Canada, many Orthodox synagogues are affiliated with Chabad, the National Council of Young Israel, or the Orthodox Union.

== Canada ==
=== Alberta ===
- Beth Israel Synagogue, Edmonton
- Congregation House of Jacob Mikveh Israel, Calgary

=== Manitoba ===
- Adas Yeshurun Herzlia, Winnipeg

=== New Brunswick ===
- Congregation Tiferes Israel, Moncton

=== Nova Scotia ===
- Beth Israel Synagogue, Halifax

=== Ontario ===
- Adas Israel Congregation, Hamilton
- Beth Avraham Yoseph of Toronto Congregation, Thornhill
- Beth Jacob Congregation, Kitchener
- Beth Jacob V'Anshei Dridlz Congregation, Toronto
- Clanton Park Synagogue, Downsview
- Congregation Ayin L'Tzion, Thornhill
- Congregation Beth Tefilah, London
- Congregation Beth Tikvah, Ottawa
- Congregation B'Nai Torah, North York
- Kehillat Shaarei Torah, Toronto
- Kiever Synagogue, Toronto
- Machzikei Hadas Congregation, Ottawa
- Petah Tikva Anshe Castilla Congregation, North York
- Shaarei Shomayim Congregation, Toronto
- Shaarey Zedek Congregation, Windsor
- Young Israel of Ottawa, Ottawa

=== Quebec ===
- Beth Israel Beth Aaron Congregation, Côte Saint-Luc
- Spanish and Portuguese Synagogue, Montreal

== Iceland ==
Jewish Community of Iceland - Chabad, Reykjavík

== Denmark ==
- Chabad House, Copenhagen
- Great Synagogue, Copenhagen
- Machsike Hadas Synagogue, Copenhagen

== Japan ==
- Chabad Lubavitch Tokyo-Japan, Tokyo
- Chabad of Kansai, Kobe
- Chabad of Takayama, Takayama

== Norway ==
- Oslo Synagogue, Oslo

== Sweden ==
- Malmö Synagogue, Malmö

== United States ==
=== Alabama ===
- Knesseth Israel Congregation, Birmingham

=== Indiana ===
- Congregation B'Nai Torah, Indianapolis
- Etz Chaim Sephardic Congregation, Indianapolis
- Hebrew Orthodox Congregation, South Bend
- Midwest Torah Center, South Bend

=== Kentucky ===
- Congregation Anshei Sfard, Louisville
- Chabad House, Louisville

=== Maryland ===
- Beth Sholom Congregation and Talmud Torah, Potomac
- Beth Tfiloh Congregation, Pikesville
- B'nai Israel Synagogue, Baltimore
- Chabad of Carroll County, Eldersburg
- Chabad of Potomac, Potomac
- Chabad of Silver Spring, Kemp Mill
- Congregation Shomrei Emunah, Baltimore
- Congregation Tiferes Yisroel, Baltimore
- Kehilas Ohr Hatorah, Kemp Mill
- Kemp Mill Synagogue (KMS), Kemp Mill
- Magen David Sephardic Congregation, Rockville
- Ohev Sholom Talmud Torah Congregation, Olney
- Shaarei Tfiloh Synagogue, Baltimore
- Silver Spring Jewish Center, Kemp Mill
- Southeast Hebrew Congregation - Knesset Yehoshua, White Oak
- Woodside Synagogue, Silver Spring
- Young Israel of White Oak, White Oak
- Young Israel Shomrai Emunah, Kemp Mill

=== Washington ===
- Congregation Ezra Bessaroth, Seattle
- Island Synagogue, Mercer Island
- Sephardic Bikur Holim Congregation, Seattle

=== Washington, D.C. ===
- Kesher Israel
- Ohev Sholom - The National Synagogue

=== Wisconsin ===
- Anshe Sfard Kehillat Torah, Milwaukee
- Congregation Anshai Lebowitz, Mequon
- Congregation Beth Jehudah, Milwaukee
- Lake Park Synagogue, Milwaukee
- Ohr Hatorah Shul And Torah Center, Milwaukee

== See also ==
- List of Conservative synagogues
- List of Humanistic synagogues
- List of Reconstructionist synagogues
- List of Reform synagogues
- List of synagogues
