= The Wimbledon Synagogue =

Synagogue in Wandsworth, London

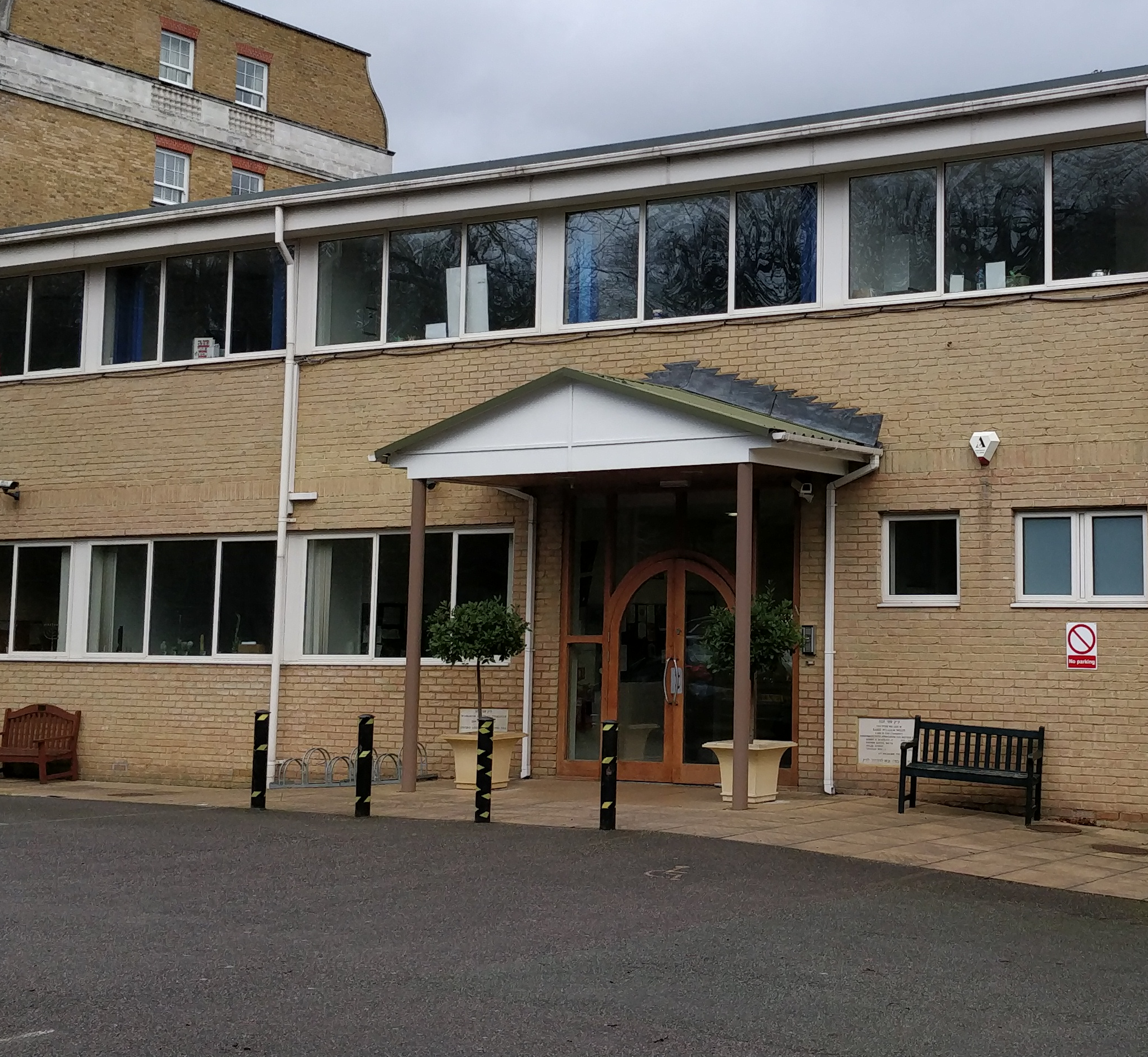
- The synagogue in 2019

- Location of the synagogue in the London Borough of Wandsworth

Religion
- Affiliation: Reform Judaism
- Ecclesiastical or organisational status: Synagogue
- Leadership: Rabbi: Adrian Schell; Chair: Julian Hunt
- Status: Active

Location
- Location: 1 Queensmere Road, Wimbledon Park, Borough of Wandsworth, London SW19 5QD
- Country: England, United Kingdom
- Coordinates: 51°26′21″N 0°13′25″W

Architecture
- Type: University college (1953)
- Established: 1949 (as a congregation)
- Completed: 1952 (Worple Road); 1997 (Queensmere Road)

Website
- wimshul.org

The Wimbledon Synagogue, formally the Wimbledon and District Synagogue, is a Reform Jewish congregation and synagogue, located at 1 Queensmere Road, Wimbledon Park, in the Borough of Wandsworth, London, England, in the United Kingdom.

The congregation was established in 1949 and was based at Worple Road, Wimbledon from 1952 to 1997. In 1997 it moved to its present premises, adapting a 1953 university college building which previously belonged to Southlands College, now part of the University of Roehampton. The building also houses a nursery school, a branch of Keren's Nursery. The congregation is a member of the Movement for Progressive Judaism and is led by rabbi Adrian Schell. In 2017, the congregation was described in The Jewish Chronicle as particularly welcoming.

== History ==
The logo of the congregation

The synagogue came into being at a meeting of the local Jewish community at the Wimbledon Hill Hotel in February 1949. In its first year the membership was 60 families. Services were held in temporary accommodation. The community decided to build a new synagogue on a site at 44 Worple Road in Wimbledon. The foundation stone was laid on 8 April 1951 by Ernest Abelson and Leonard Montefiore (of the West London Synagogue) and the synagogue was formally opened and dedicated on 25 May 1952 by Rabbi Dr Leo Baeck. In September 1997 the synagogue moved to its present site, adapting the former Athlone Hall (dating from 1953).

== Notable rabbis ==
The synagogue's rabbis have included:

- Charles Berg
- Sylvia Rothschild
- Sybil Sheridan

== Facilities and activities ==
As of 2021 the synagogue had 850 members.

The synagogue has three sets of stained glass windows. Their abstract designs were made by Graham Jones with Peters Glass Studio in Germany.

== Social action ==
Wimbledon Synagogue is a Fairtrade synagogue and has been involved for many years with the Faith in Action Merton Homeless Project, a charity which works with a range of agencies to support homeless, precariously housed and other marginalised people within the London Borough of Merton. It has also accommodated local homeless people overnight as part of the Merton Night Shelter initiative.

== In the media ==
In 2010 Wimbledon Synagogue hosted the first ever broadcast of BBC Radio 4's Any Questions? from a synagogue. The programme's broadcast coincided with the 200th anniversary of the first Reform Judaism service.

== Notable members ==
- Brett Goldstein, actor, had his barmitzvah at the synagogue
- Thelma Ruby, actress
- Mark Urban, journalist, historian, and broadcaster
- Stuart Urban, film and television director

== See also ==
- History of the Jews in England
- List of Jewish communities in the United Kingdom
- List of synagogues in the United Kingdom
