= Isle of Wight Jewish Society =

Jewish community in the Isle of Wight, England

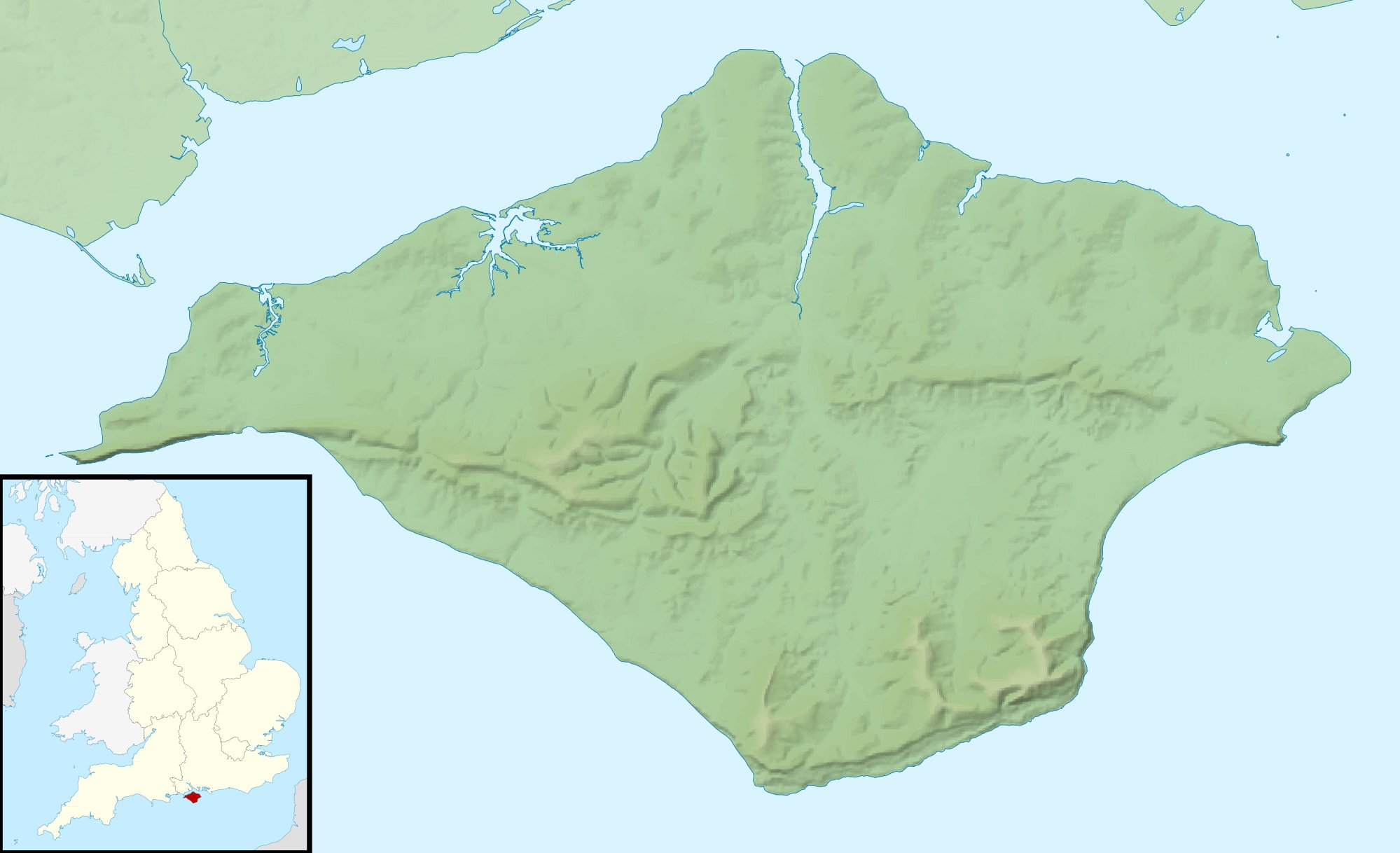
- Location of the synagogue in the Isle of Wight

Religion
- Affiliation: Reform Judaism
- Ecclesiastical or organizational status: Synagogue
- Status: Active

Location
- Location: Cowes, Isle of Wight, England
- Country: United Kingdom
- Interactive map of Isle of Wight Jewish Society
- Coordinates: 50°45′34″N 1°18′01″W

Architecture
- Established: 2005 (as a congregation)

The Isle of Wight Jewish Society is a Reform Jewish congregation, located in Cowes, in the Isle of Wight, England, in the United Kingdom. Founded in June 2005, the congregation became a member of the Movement for Reform Judaism in June 2021.

The community meets in members' homes. The Bournemouth Reform Synagogue has acted as the mother congregation to the Society.

== See also ==
- History of the Jews in England
- List of Jewish communities in the United Kingdom
- List of synagogues in the United Kingdom
