= Southend and District Reform Synagogue =

Synagogue in Southend-on-Sea, England

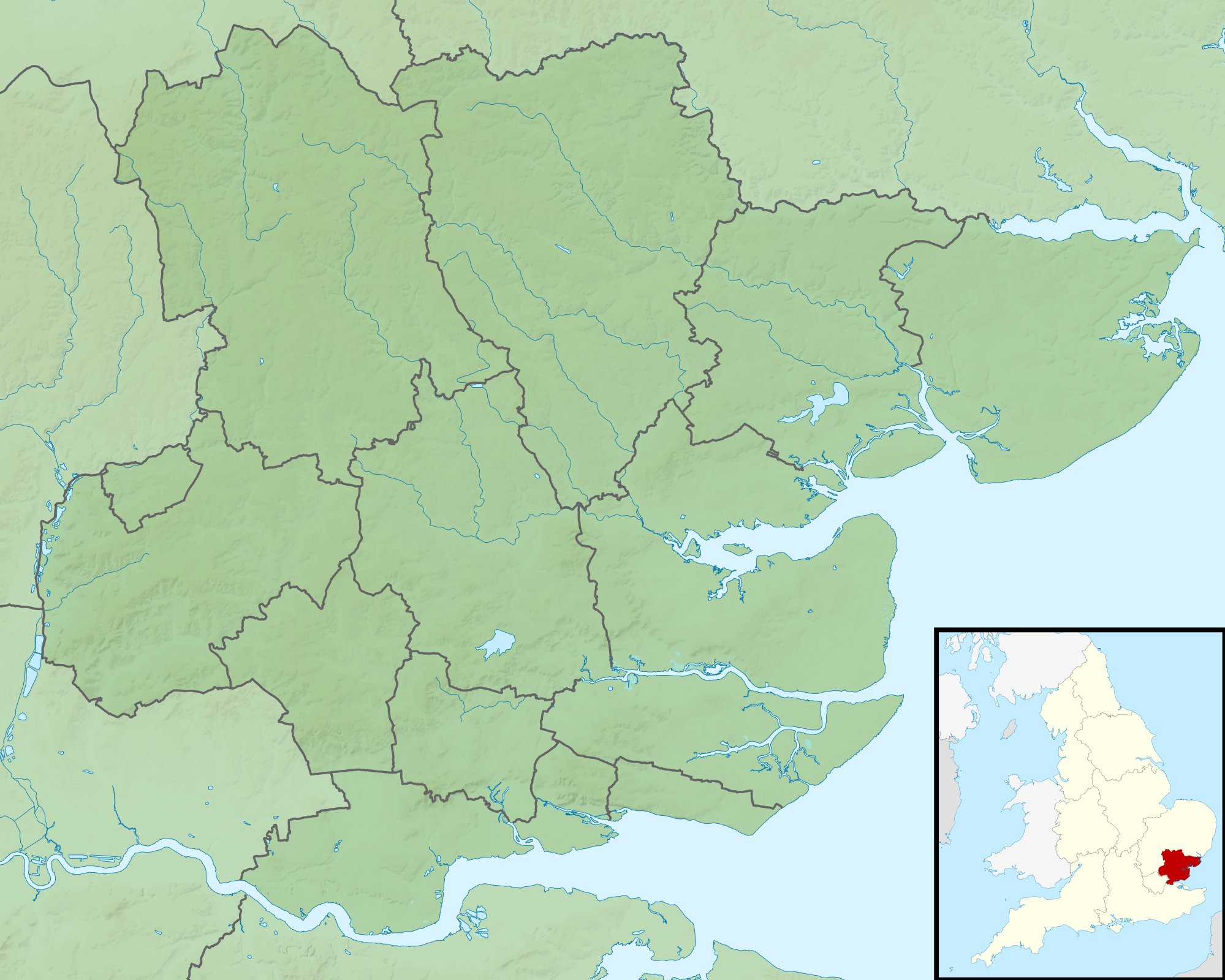
- Location of the synagogue in Essex

Religion
- Affiliation: Reform Judaism
- Ecclesiastical or organizational status: Synagogue
- Leadership: Rabbi Warren Elf
- Status: Active

Location
- Location: 851 London Road, Southend-on-Sea, Essex, England SS0 9SZ
- Country: United Kingdom
- Interactive map of Southend and District Reform Synagogue
- Coordinates: 51°32′46″N 0°40′28″E

Architecture
- Established: 1946 (as a congregation)
- Completed: 1961

Website
- southendreform.org.uk

Southend and District Reform Synagogue is a Reform Jewish congregation and synagogue, located in Southend-on-Sea, Essex, England.

== History ==
Founded in 1946, the congregation is affiliated with the Movement for Reform Judaism. The congregation produces a newsletter, Hakol Shel Sinai.

The congregation's part-time rabbi is Warren Elf, who is based in Manchester and is also the part-time rabbi at Liverpool Reform Synagogue.

== See also ==
Logo of the congregation

- History of the Jews in England
- List of Jewish communities in the United Kingdom
- List of synagogues in the United Kingdom
