= Temple Israel (Silver Spring, Maryland) =

Former synagogue, now church in Silver Spring, Maryland, United States

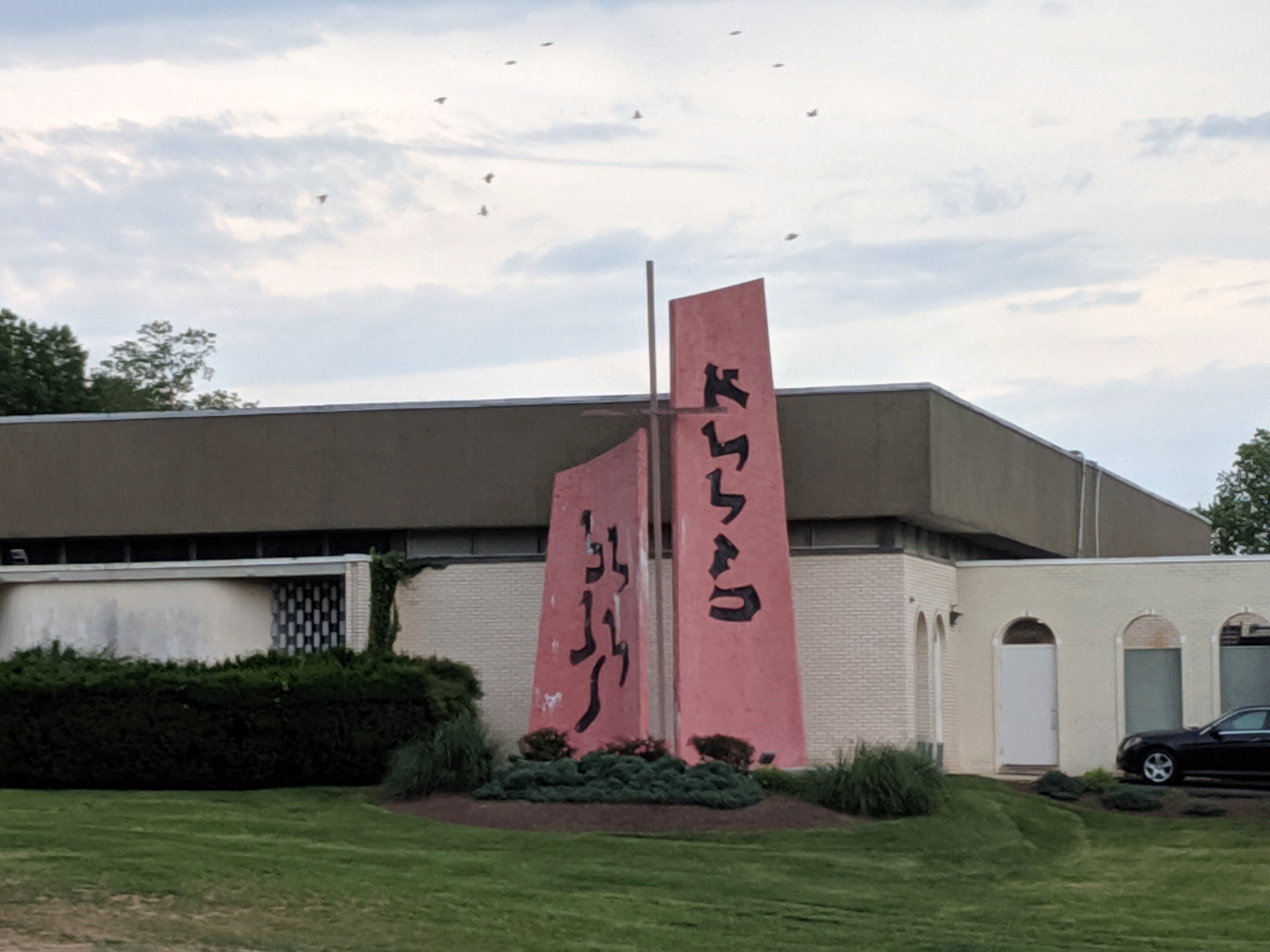
- The former synagogue, now church, in 2019

- Location in Maryland

Religion
- Affiliation: Conservative Judaism (1951–1997); Baptist (since 1997)
- Ecclesiastical or organizational status: Synagogue (1951–1997); Church (since 1997)
- Status: Active (as a church)

Location
- Location: 420 University Blvd East, Silver Spring, Maryland
- Country: United States
- Interactive map of Temple Israel
- Coordinates: 39°00′31″N 76°59′51″W

Architecture
- Established: 1951 (as a congregation)
- Completed: 1952 (as a synagogue)

Temple Israel is a former Conservative Jewish congregation and synagogue, located at 420 University Boulevard East, in the neighborhood of Montgomery Knolls, in Silver Spring, Maryland, in the United States. The congregation was established in 1951, the building was completed in 1952 and operated as a synagogue until 1997; when it was subsequently repurposed as the Mount Jezreel Baptist Church, a Baptist church building.

== History ==
Temple Israel was founded in 1951 as a Conservative congregation, originally named the Langley Hebrew Congregation. Rabbi Lewis Weintraub was the synagogue's first rabbi. In 1952, the synagogue's building was constructed on University Boulevard. Sam Eig, a Jewish real estate developer, donated 10 acres (4.0 ha) to the congregation. A synagogue, library, social hall, and Hebrew School were built at this location. During its peak, Temple Israel was home to 750 families. About half of these families were headed by government employees who commuted into Washington, D.C. for work.

As part of the Soviet Jewry movement, the synagogue "adopted" two Soviet prisoners of conscience: Aleksander Feldman in 1976 and Amner Zavurov in 1977. Rosh Hashanah greeting cards were sent to Soviet Jews in 1975 and Simchat Torah greetings were sent in 1976. In 1979, English classes were held for Soviet-Jewish immigrants.

In the 1990s, changing demographics caused Temple Israel to make the "painful decision" to sell the synagogue building on University Boulevard. In 1997, Temple Israel merged with Beth Tikva (now Tikvat Israel) of Rockville, Maryland. Beth Tikva had been founded in 1959 as the Rockville-Wheaton Synagogue. As of 2023, the building that was housed Temple Israel is home to Mount Jezreel Baptist Church, a predominantly black church.

== See also ==
- History of the Jews in Maryland
