= Shir Hayim =

Former Reformer synagogue in London, England

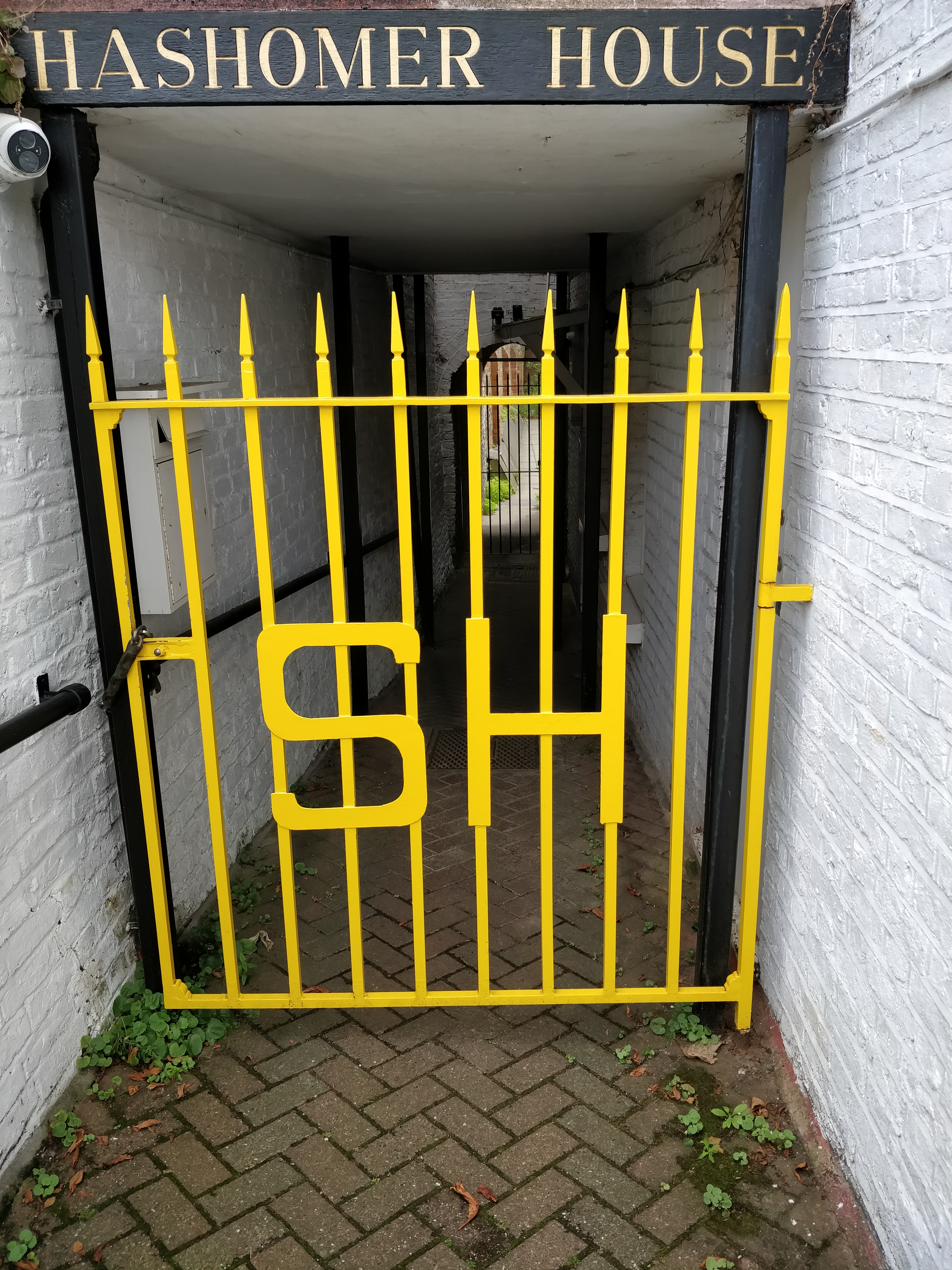
- Entrance to the former synagogue

- Location of the former synagogue in the London Borough of Camden

Religion
- Affiliation: Reform Judaism (former)
- Ecclesiastical or organisational status: Synagogue (1975–2020)
- Status: Closed; and merged

Location
- Location: Hashomer House, 37a Broadhurst Gardens, West Hampstead, London Borough of Camden, England NW6 3BN
- Country: United Kingdom
- Coordinates: 51°32′48″N 0°11′09″W

Architecture
- Established: 1975 (as a congregation)

Shir Hayim ("A Song of Life") was a Reform Jewish congregation and synagogue, located at 37a Broadhurst Gardens, in West Hampstead, in the Borough of Camden, London, England, in the United Kingdom. Established in 1975, the congregation closed in 2020 when it was merged with Willesden Minyan to form the Makor Hayim congregation.

== History ==
The congregation was established in 1975 as the Hampstead Reform Jewish Community until 1988. Since c. 1986, its services were held at Hashomer House, in West Hampstead. Rabbi Larry Tabick was its first rabbi, from 1976 to 1980, and its last rabbi, from 1990 until his retirement in 2017.

In 2018, The Jewish Chronicle described the congregation as being very welcoming.

In 2020 the congregation merged with Willesden Minyan to form Makor Hayim, a new Reform congregation.

== See also ==
- History of the Jews in England
- List of former synagogues in the United Kingdom
