= Bournemouth Reform Synagogue =

Reform Jewish synagogue in Bournemouth, England

- Hebrew: קהילה קדושה שערי צדק
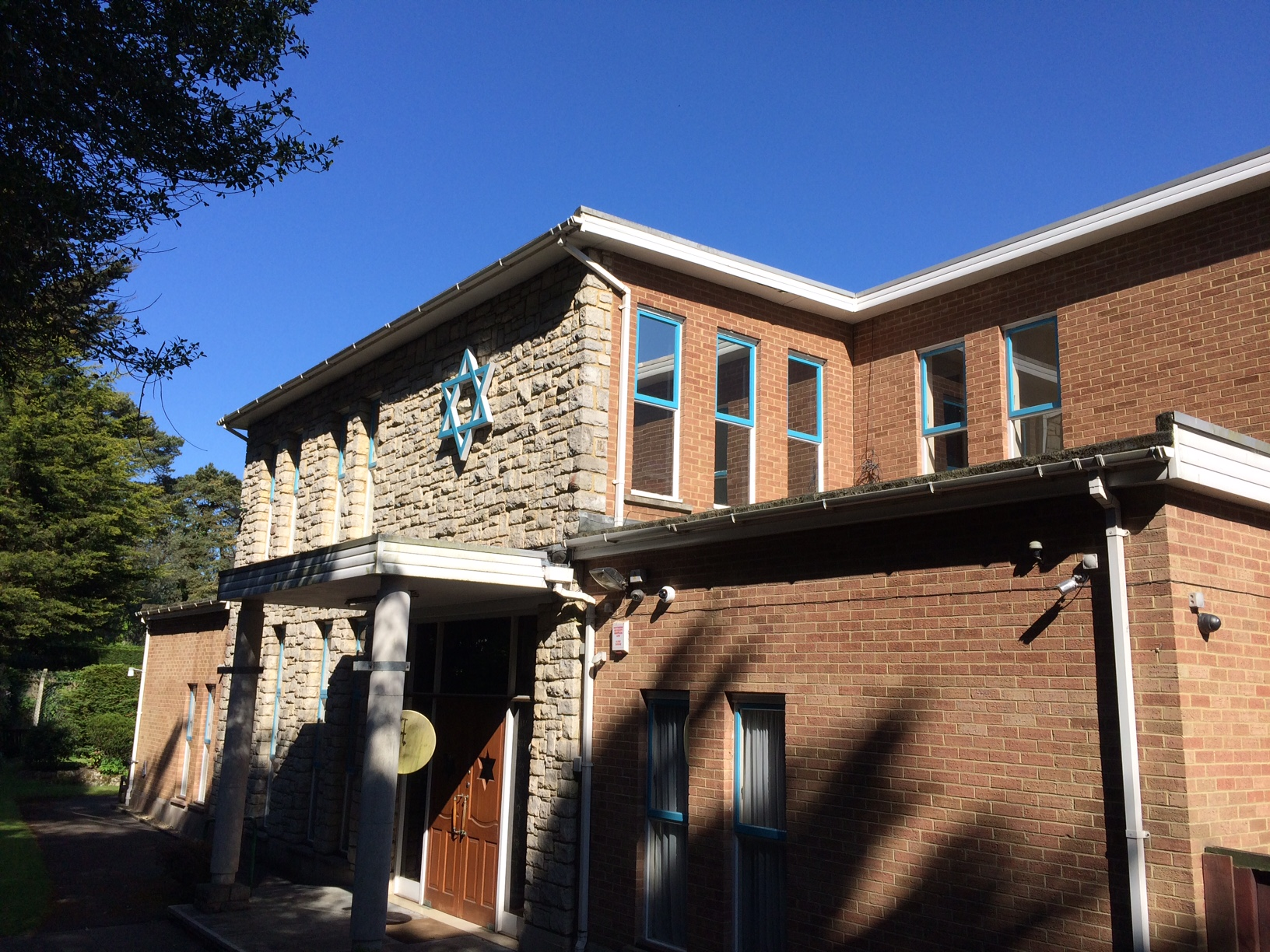
- The synagogue, in 2016

- Location of the synagogue in Dorset

Religion
- Affiliation: Reform Judaism
- Ecclesiastical or organizational status: Synagogue
- Leadership: Rabbi Maurice Michaels
- Status: Active

Location
- Location: 53 Christchurch Road, Bournemouth, Dorset, England BH1 3PW
- Country: United Kingdom
- Interactive map of Bournemouth Reform Synagogue
- Coordinates: 50°43′41″N 1°51′50″W

Architecture
- Established: 1947 (as a congregation)
- Completed: c. 1962

Website
- www.bournemouthreform.org.uk

The Bournemouth Reform Synagogue (Hebrew: קהילה קדושה שערי צדק, romanized: Kehillah Kedoshah Sha'arei Tzedek, lit. 'the sacred community 'Gates of Righteousness'), also known as BRS, is a Reform Jewish congregation and synagogue, located in Bournemouth, Dorset, England, in the United Kingdom.

The congregation acts as a "mother congregation" to the Isle of Wight Jewish Society.

== History ==
Bournemouth Reform Synagogue was founded in 1947 as the Bournemouth New Synagogue, a break-away from the Bournemouth Hebrew Congregation. The split met with fierce opposition from the Hebrew Congregation who at the time refused to share the cemetery. At the time it was the ninth Reform synagogue in the country.

== Clergy ==
The following individuals have served as rabbi of the congregation:

Ordinal	Name	Term started	Term ended	Time in office	Notes
1	Charles Berg	1948	1953	4–5 years	
2	Stanley Solomons	1953	1969	15–16 years	
3	Rabbi Harold Vallins	1970	1972	1–2 years	
4	David Soetendorp	1972	2005	32–33 years	
5	Neil Amswych	2005	2014	8–9 years	
6	Maurice Michaels	October 2014	incumbent	11 years, 303 days	

Rabbi Jenny Goldfried Amswych, wife of rabbi Neil Amswych served as the congregation's only associate rabbi from 2007 until 2014.

== The congregation in recent times ==
Bournemouth Reform Synagogue is a member of the Movement for Reform Judaism, and shares similar goals. It seeks to be welcoming to everyone for social activities, educational programmes, for support or for spiritual nourishment. It seeks to respond to the needs of individuals who need a combination of both tradition and modernity, and says that it believes that "a healthy community is one that prays, socialises, learns, plans and grows together."

BRS is one of the many communities who responded to a major difficulty of Reform Judaism – "the question of religious authority with the resulting difficulty of setting limits to a liberal religion." A centralised model of religious leadership under Rabbi Soetendorp was responsible for significantly growing the community in size, and in drawing people into the community.

Under the leadership of Rabbi Neil Amswych the Foundations course was established for adults in 2005, and in 2006 became a partially online course for those who live far away from Bournemouth. Community-led decisions have always been a part of every British Reform community but BRS is one of the communities that has employed a model in which the Ritual Forum, re-established in 2005, advises the Rabbi and Council of ritual decisions after long discussions that can sometimes take place over a period of months.

Under Rabbi Soetendorp's leadership, the synagogue published two volumes of Emet – books compiled and edited by Eve Cowan – that told the life stories of some of its members. This model was expanded upon by Rabbi Neil Amswych who, on the Kabbalat Shabbat (Friday night) service, will often ask members to share the things that they are thankful for from the week that has been, and the things that they are looking forward to in the week to come. By ritualising story-telling the synagogue has doubled the number of people attending its Friday night (Shabbat) services.

In 2010 Councillor Barry Goldbart became the fifth Jewish Mayor of Bournemouth. He is the first Reform Jewish Mayor and a member of Bournemouth Reform Synagogue. Rabbi Neil Amswych was appointed as the Mayor's Chaplain.

=== Prayer services ===
Services are in both Hebrew and English and members are encouraged to take part in relevant mitzvot (commandments) regardless of gender. The Friday evening service is usually more fluid with a story as the central focus, while the Saturday morning service has the Torah reading and its exposition as the central point.

A significant development in the liturgy was made in March 2008 when the community voted by a large majority to adopt the eighth edition of the Forms of Prayer siddur written by the Movement for Reform Judaism. For Succot 2009, Rabbi Jenny created a booklet of prayers to allow the community to move away from the 50-year-old pilgrim festival liturgy. Another major development in the services was the relocation of the reading desk from the front to the middle of the community, creating a more inclusive atmosphere.

Many decisions regarding community customs are made at the synagogue's Ritual Forum which meets around every six weeks and which is open to all synagogue members.

=== The Bournemouth Jewish Social Centre ===
The Bournemouth Jewish Social Centre, formerly called the Day Centre, was held on a Monday lunchtime bringing together Jews from all denominations across Bournemouth, however with dwindling attendance the Centre closed in 2013 after 32 years.

=== Outreach ===
Bournemouth Reform Synagogue often holds events that link up with the South Hampshire Reform Jewish Community, and the smaller community in Salisbury. It also takes under its wing the Reform Jewish community on the Isle of Wight, which is based at Wroxall. Outreach work includes interfaith activities, such as the 2007 Interfaith Seder, and school visits (either to the community or by community representatives such as Rabbi Neil Amswych, Rabbi Jenny Goldfried Amswych, or educators from the community).

=== Education ===
The religion school at Bournemouth Reform Synagogue is called "Oseh Shalom" and it brings Jews to Reform Judaism from reception up to teenage years.

In 2006, Rabbi Neil Amswych created the Foundations Course which was designed to teach about matters that lie at the heart of being a Reform Jew. There were sessions three times a month – two Wednesday evenings and one Shabbat afternoon. In 2007, the two Wednesday evening sessions were moved online, so that the Foundations course could be accessed by more people. The website also contains an "Ask the Rabbi" page, a Torah Thoughts page with commentaries on most weekly portions (as well as occasional sermons), and also includes online courses, such as the course for 2007 entitled "Why do Bad Things Happen to Good People?" In place of the Foundations course, the Shabbat afternoon sessions for 2009 were an introduction to key areas of Reform Judaism called "Beyond Survival – Reform Judaism Today." In 2009, the adult education also expanded to include an introduction to Hebrew reading class and also a Talmud class (which has since been disbanded) led by Rabbi Jenny.

=== Social action ===
Following the name of the community – Gates of Righteousness – Bournemouth Reform Synagogue has a history of social action. Under Rabbi David Sotendorp's guidance, the community was very prominent in the campaign to free Soviet Jewry in the 1980s. Under the guidance of Rabbi Neil Amswych, the community's social action focused on environmental concerns, both locally and globally. Visitors to the synagogue website are also directed to internet charity sites where surfers can give to charity for free.

In 2009, BRS set up "Sha'arei Tzedek" – the BRS Social Action Group. The first event was to synchronise with Mitzvah Day 2009, soon followed by a collection of warm clothes for those in the FSU. The January 2010 earthquake in Haiti also brought a community-wide request for donations to World Jewish Relief.

== See also ==
- History of the Jews in England
- List of Jewish communities in the United Kingdom
- List of synagogues in the United Kingdom
