= Congregation Beth Or =

Reform Jewish synagogue in Maple Glen, Pennsylvania, US

- Location in Pennsylvania

Religion
- Affiliation: Reform Judaism
- Ecclesiastical or organizational status: Synagogue
- Leadership: Rabbi Gregory Marx; Rabbi Jason Bonder (Associate)
- Status: Active

Location
- Location: Maple Glen, Greater Philadelphia, Pennsylvania
- Country: United States
- Interactive map of Congregation Beth Or
- Coordinates: 40°11′1″N 75°11′25″W

Architecture
- Style: Synagogue
- Established: 1955 (as a congregation)
- Completed: 2006

Website
- bethor.org

Congregation Beth Or logo

Congregation Beth Or (transliterated from Hebrew as "House of Light") is a Reform Jewish congregation and synagogue located in Maple Glen, a northern suburb of Greater Philadelphia, Pennsylvania, in the United States.

== History ==
Beth Or was established in 1955 in Mount Airy. In 1974, the congregation moved to Spring House, until relocating in 2006 to its current home in Maple Glen. The dedication of the new synagogue on May 15, 2006, was attended by Pennsylvania Governor Ed Rendell.

Rabbi Gregory Marx has led Beth Or since 1989. In 2018, Associate Rabbi Jason Bonder joined the congregation.

== See also ==
- History of the Jews in Pennsylvania
