= Liverpool Reform Synagogue =

Reform synagogue in Liverpool, England

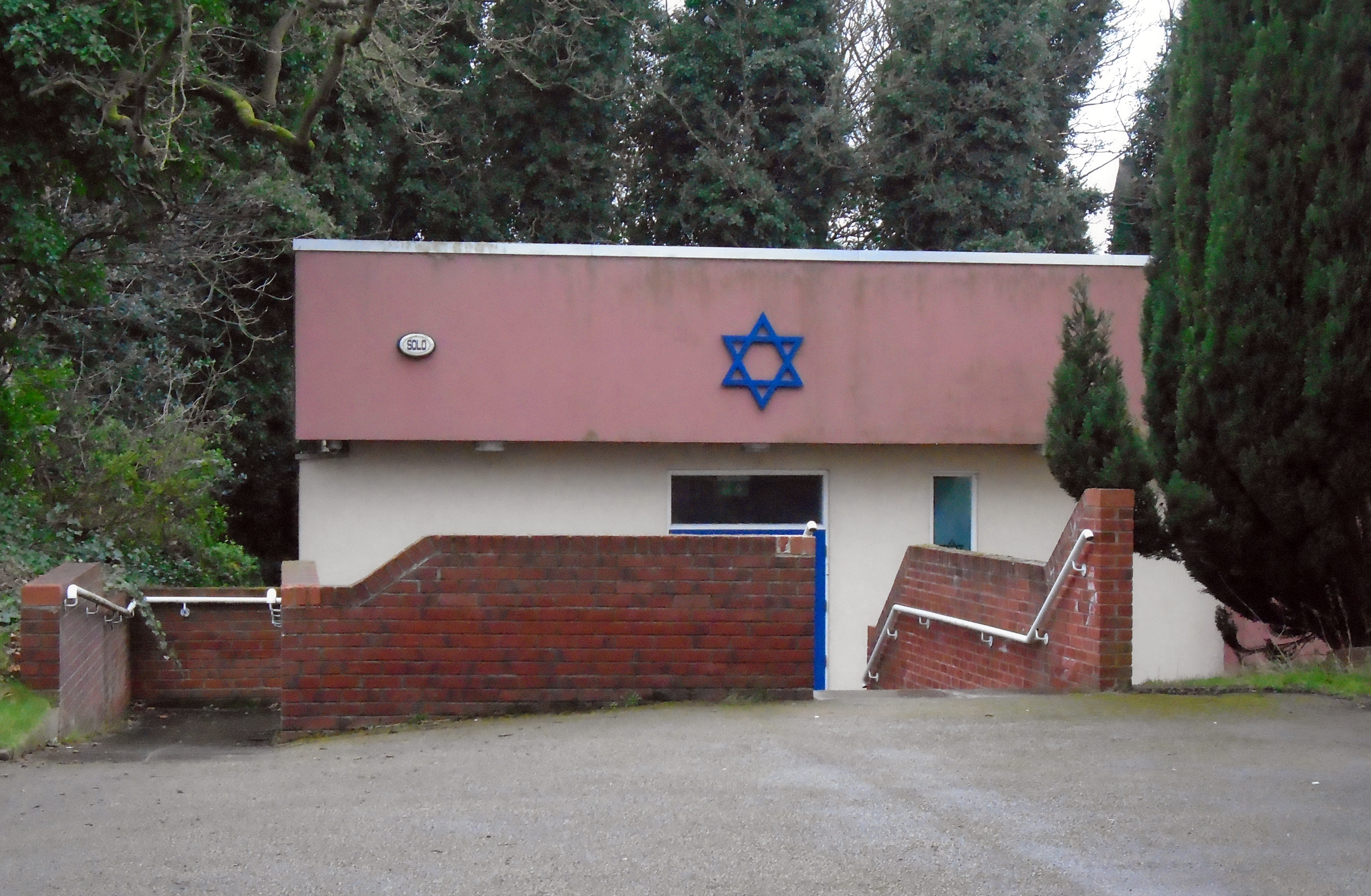
- Front entrance to the synagogue in 2017

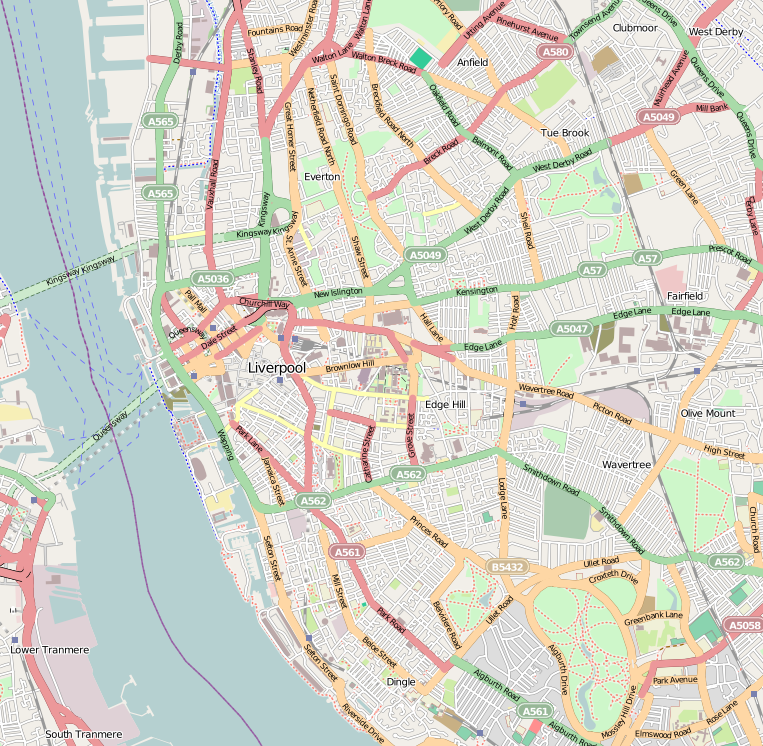
- Location of the synagogue in Liverpool

Religion
- Affiliation: Reform Judaism
- Ecclesiastical or organizational status: Synagogue
- Leadership: Rabbi Warren Elf MBE
- Status: Active

Location
- Location: Liverpool, England
- Interactive map of Liverpool Reform Synagogue
- Coordinates: 53°23′49.8″N 2°54′56″W

Architecture
- Established: 1928 (as a congregation)
- Completed: 1962

Website
- lrshul.org

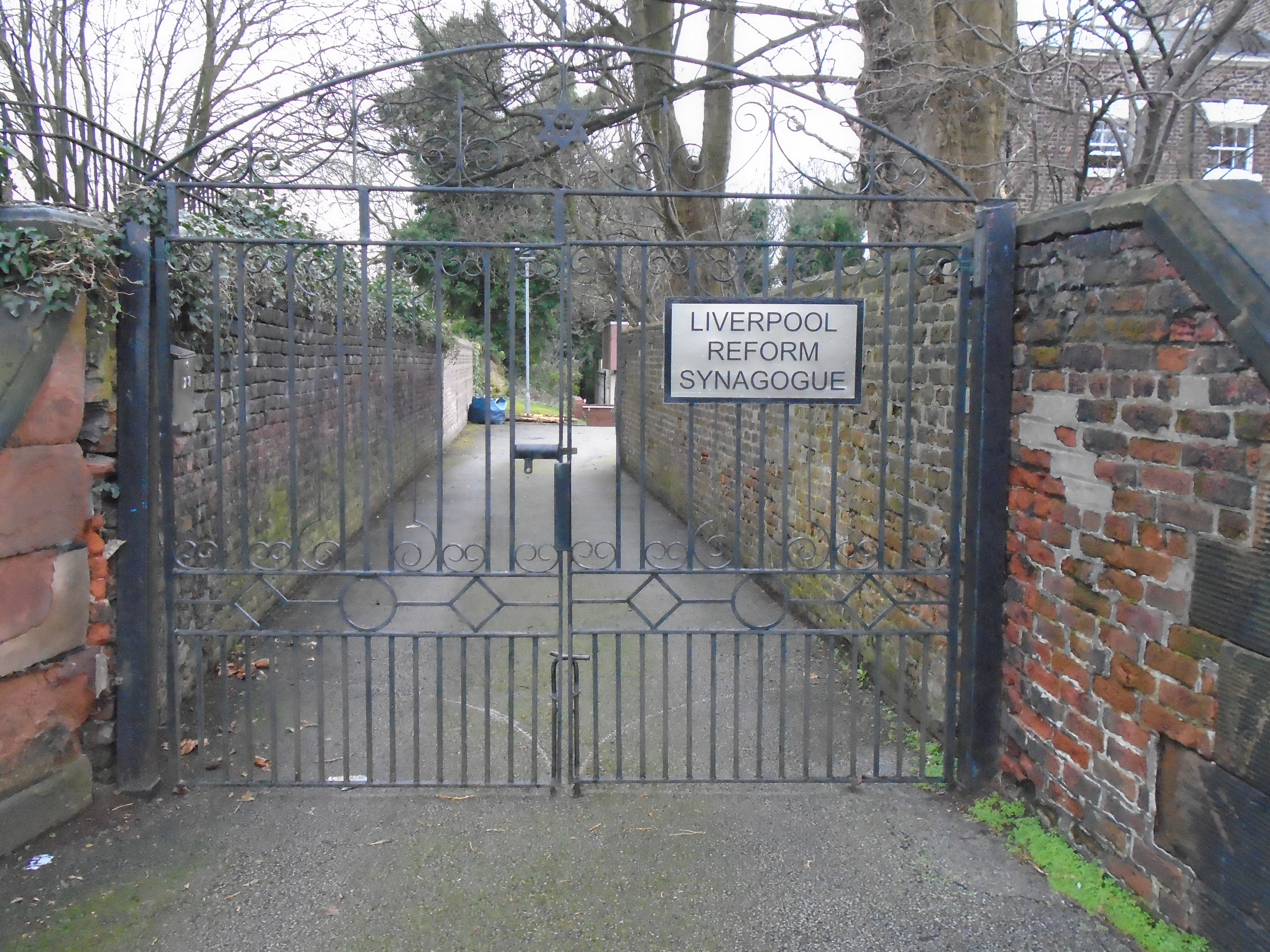
Entrance gates to the synagogue

Liverpool Reform Synagogue is a Reform Jewish congregation and synagogue in Liverpool, England. It is a member of the Movement for Reform Judaism.

== Overview ==
The congregation was established in 1928 as the Liverpool Liberal Jewish Congregation, a member of the Jewish Religious Union for the Advancement of Liberal Judaism, and was one of the first progressive Jewish communities that were established outside London. From c. 1937 until 1962, the Liberal congregation was located at 1 Hope Place (off Hope Street) in the city centre, the site of the former Liverpool New Hebrew Congregation. The former Hope Place building subsequently housed the Unity Theatre.

In 1962, under the name Progressive Synagogue, the congregation moved to premises located at either 28 (or 28a) Church Road North in the Wavertree district, located adjacent to the current synagogue building. The congregation subsequently moved to its current location, a smaller building in the gardens on the same site at 28 Church Road North. The former synagogue building on this site was closed, converted into a block of apartments, and listed as a Grade II building in 1952.

The congregation's part-time rabbi is Warren Elf MBE, who is based in Manchester and is also the part-time rabbi at Southend and District Reform Synagogue in Southend-on-Sea.

== Notable members ==
- Luciana Berger (born 1981), politician and former Labour MP for Liverpool Wavertree.

== See also ==
- List of Jewish communities in the United Kingdom
- List of synagogues in the United Kingdom
