= Temple Micah =

Reform Jewish synagogue in Washington, D.C.

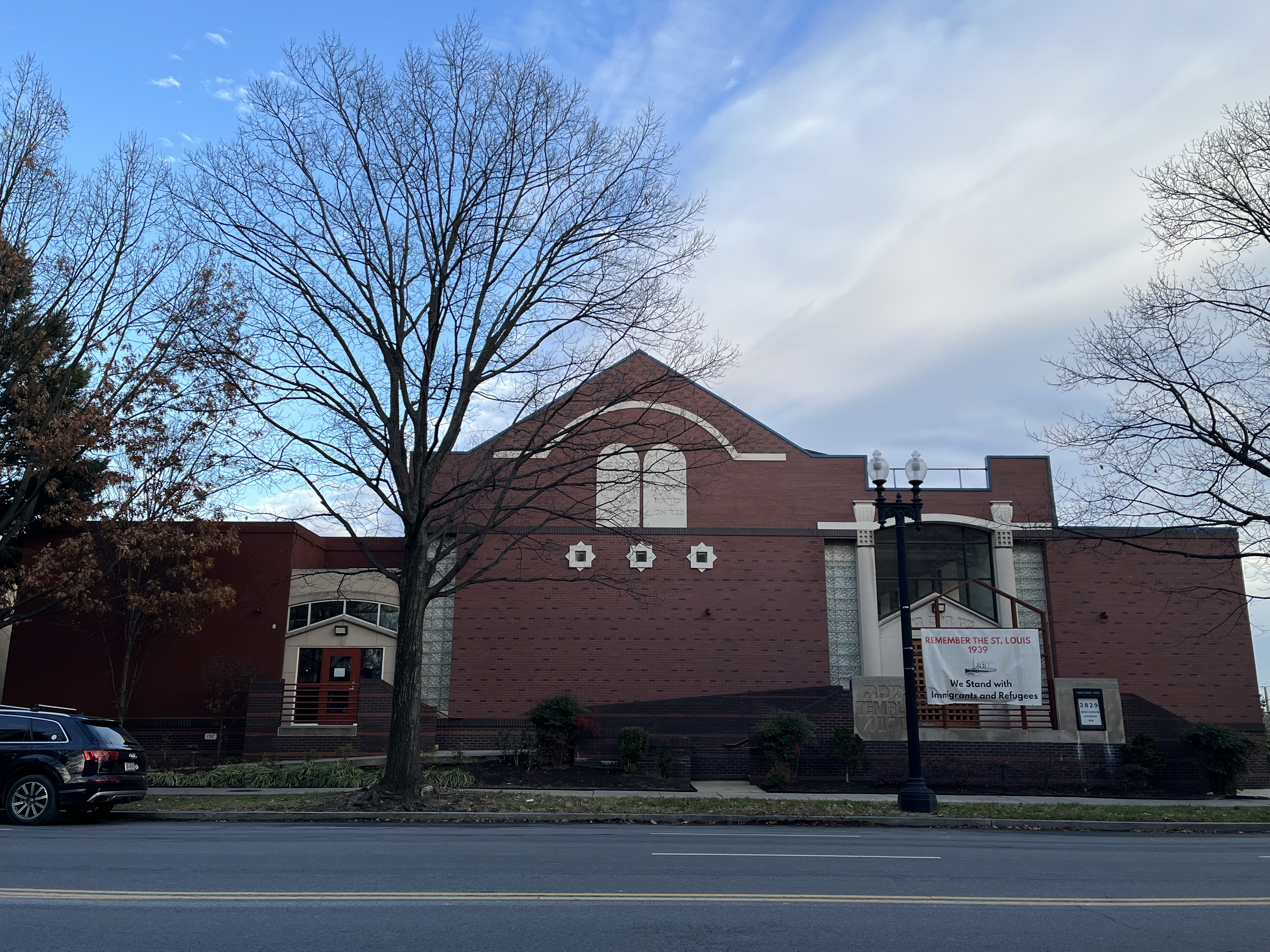
- Temple Micah, December 2025.

- Location in Washington, D.C.

Religion
- Affiliation: Reform Judaism
- Ecclesiastical or organizational status: Synagogue
- Leadership: Rabbi Daniel Zemel
- Status: Active

Location
- Location: 2829 Wisconsin Ave NW, Washington, D.C., 20007
- Country: United States
- Interactive map of Temple Micah
- Coordinates: 38°55′36″N 77°04′23″W

Architecture
- Type: Synagogue
- Established: 1963 (as a congregation)
- Completed: 1995

Website
- www.templemicah.org

Temple Micah is a Reform Jewish synagogue in Washington, D.C.

== History ==
Temple Micah was founded as Southwest Hebrew Congregation in 1963 and was initially located in Southwest, D.C. near the Potomac River waterfront. The congregation officially affiliated with the Union for Reform Judaism in 1965. In 1966, the congregation began a 28 year long shared space agreement with St. Augustine's Episcopal Church. In 1968, Southwest Hebrew Congregation adopted the name Temple Micah. In 1995, Temple Micah moved to its current location in Northwest, D.C.

Temple Micah had used Zoom for its Shabbat and holiday services prior to the COVID-19 pandemic. During the pandemic, the temple moved all services to Zoom. Services now have both in-person attendance as well as Zoom and livestream.

== Notable members ==
- Dana Bash, journalist and news anchor
- Paul Strauss, politician and attorney
- Jake Tapper, journalist and writer
