= Charles Berg (rabbi) =

German-British rabbi

Rabbi Charles Berg

Personal life
- Born: Karl Rauchtenberg; 1911 Treptow, Berlin
- Died: 24 November 1979 (aged 67–68)
- Buried: Golders Green Jewish Cemetery

Religious life
- Religion: Judaism
- Denomination: Reform Judaism
- Synagogue: Bournemouth Reform Synagogue 1948-1952; Wimbledon and District Synagogue 1953–1974
- Position: Rabbi
- Semikhah: 1952

Rabbi Charles Berg, born Karl Rauchtenberg (1911 – 24 November 1979), was the first non-Orthodox rabbi to be ordained in England. He came to the United Kingdom in 1939 as a refugee from Nazi Germany, having been interned in Sachsenhausen concentration camp following Kristallnacht.

After assisting Rabbi Werner van der Zyl at Kitchener Camp, a camp for Jewish refugees in Sandwich, Kent, he served in the British Army's Pioneer Corps and, at the end of the Second World War, was involved in the interrogation of Konrad Adenauer.

Berg started his rabbinical training at the Hochschule für die Wissenschaft des Judentums in Berlin and continued it privately. He received his semicha in 1952 after being examined by Rabbis Leo Baeck, Arthur Lowenstamm and Dr Max Katten, becoming the first non-Orthodox rabbi to be ordained in England.

He served as Rabbi at Bournemouth Reform Synagogue from 1948 to 1952. In 1953 Wimbledon and District Synagogue appointed him as its first rabbi. When he retired in 1974, the community had grown to 750 members.

He died on 24 November 1979 and is buried at Golders Green Jewish Cemetery.
