= Temple Sinai (Washington, D.C.) =

Reform Jewish synagogue in Washington, D.C.

- Location in Washington, D.C. Temple Sinai (Washington, D.C.) (the United States)

Religion
- Affiliation: Reform Judaism
- Ecclesiastical or organizational status: Synagogue
- Status: Active

Location
- Location: 3100 Military Rd NW, Washington, DC 20015
- Country: United States
- Interactive map of Temple Sinai
- Coordinates: 38°57′38″N 77°03′46″W

Architecture
- Type: Synagogue
- Established: 1951 (as a congregation)
- Completed: 1957

Website
- templesinaidc.org

Temple Sinai is a Reform Jewish synagogue in Washington, D.C.

== History ==
In 1950, a group of seven families joined to form a congregation, believing the Reform Jewish movement to have become too doctrinaire. On April 1, 1951, the group chose the name Temple Sinai and was officially chartered with the Union of American Hebrew Congregations (UAHC), now known as the Union for Reform Judaism. In 1952, Dean Francis B. Sayre Jr. invited the congregation to use the space at the Bethlehem Chapel of the National Cathedral. In 1953, the congregation purchased a property in the Chevy Chase neighborhood of Northwest DC. The cornerstone of Temple Sinai was laid in October 1957.

In 2014, Rabbi Adam Rosenwasser was hired as an associate rabbi. A gay man, Rabbi Rosenwasser was the first rabbi of a DC synagogue to have a spouse of the same sex.

In Fall 2023, Temple Sinai built an extension to accommodate the congregation's growing membership. In 2022, the synagogue had 1,140 member families.

== Notable members ==
- Jamie Raskin, politician and law professor
