= Temple B'nai Israel (Easton, Maryland) =

Reform Jewish synagogue in Easton, Maryland, US

- Location in Maryland

Religion
- Affiliation: Reform Judaism
- Ecclesiastical or organizational status: Synagogue
- Leadership: Rabbi Peter Hyman
- Status: Active

Location
- Location: 7199 Tristan Drive, Easton, Maryland 21601
- Country: United States
- Interactive map of Temple B'nai Israel
- Coordinates: 38°44′49″N 76°04′20″W

Architecture
- Type: Synagogue
- Established: 1951 (as a congregation)
- Completed: 2018

Website
- bnaiisraeleaston.org

Temple B'nai Israel is a Reform Jewish synagogue, located at 7199 Tristan Drive, in Easton, Maryland, in the United States. It is the only synagogue on Maryland's upper Eastern Shore. It is also known as the Satell Center for Jewish Life on the Eastern Shore.

== History ==
The temple was formed in September 1951 with 50 members.

In 1989, Easton was home to a Jewish community of around 100 people. About 40 Jews in Easton belonged to the temple, which had no rabbi or cantor at the time. Four or five community members kept a kosher home, driving to Baltimore to purchase kosher meat.

In June 2018, the congregation moved to a new and larger building with improved accessibility for elderly and disabled members, partly funded by Ed Satell, a prominent local businessman. Some additional funding came from Paul Prager, a New York businessman. As of 2018, the congregation had quadrupled in membership since 1951, with approximately 200 members. Rabbi Peter Hyman has been the temple's rabbi since 2009.

In December 2023, during Hanukkah, Temple B'nai Israel's Rabbi Peter Hyman presided over the first public menorah lighting in Centreville, Maryland.

== See also ==
- History of the Jews in Maryland
