= Kol Tzedek =

- Hebrew: קול צדק
- Location in West Philadelphia

Religion
- Affiliation: Reconstructionist Judaism
- Leadership: Rabbi Ari Lev Fornari
- Status: Active

Location
- Location: 5300 Whitby Ave, Philadelphia, Pennsylvania
- Country: United States
- Interactive map of Kol Tzedek
- Coordinates: 39°56′44″N 75°13′43″W

Website
- kol-tzedek.org

Kol Tzedek is a Reconstructionist synagogue in West Philadelphia.

The congregation was founded in 2004 in the Cedar Park neighborhood as part of a Jewish resurgence in West Philadelphia. For many years they were housed in the Calvary United Methodist Church at 48th Street and Baltimore Avenue, but in 2024 they moved into their own space at 53rd Street and Whitby Avenue, only a few blocks away.

The synagogue often hosts fundraisers to benefit the local community, such as their 2020 Hanukkah party benefitting YEAH Philly, an organization offering resources to teens affected by gun violence, or their 2022 Purim celebration where the money went to cancelling medical debt. The congregation has been described as diverse, welcoming of LGBT congregants, and predominately left-wing, and has been outspoken in calling for a ceasefire in Gaza.

The founding Rabbi Lauren Grabelle Herrmann stepped down in 2014, and the synagogue has since been led by Rabbi Ari Lev Fornari. The congregation has among its members Philadelphia City Councilmember Rue Landau.
