= Temple Sons of Israel =

Synagogue in Sydney, Nova Scotia

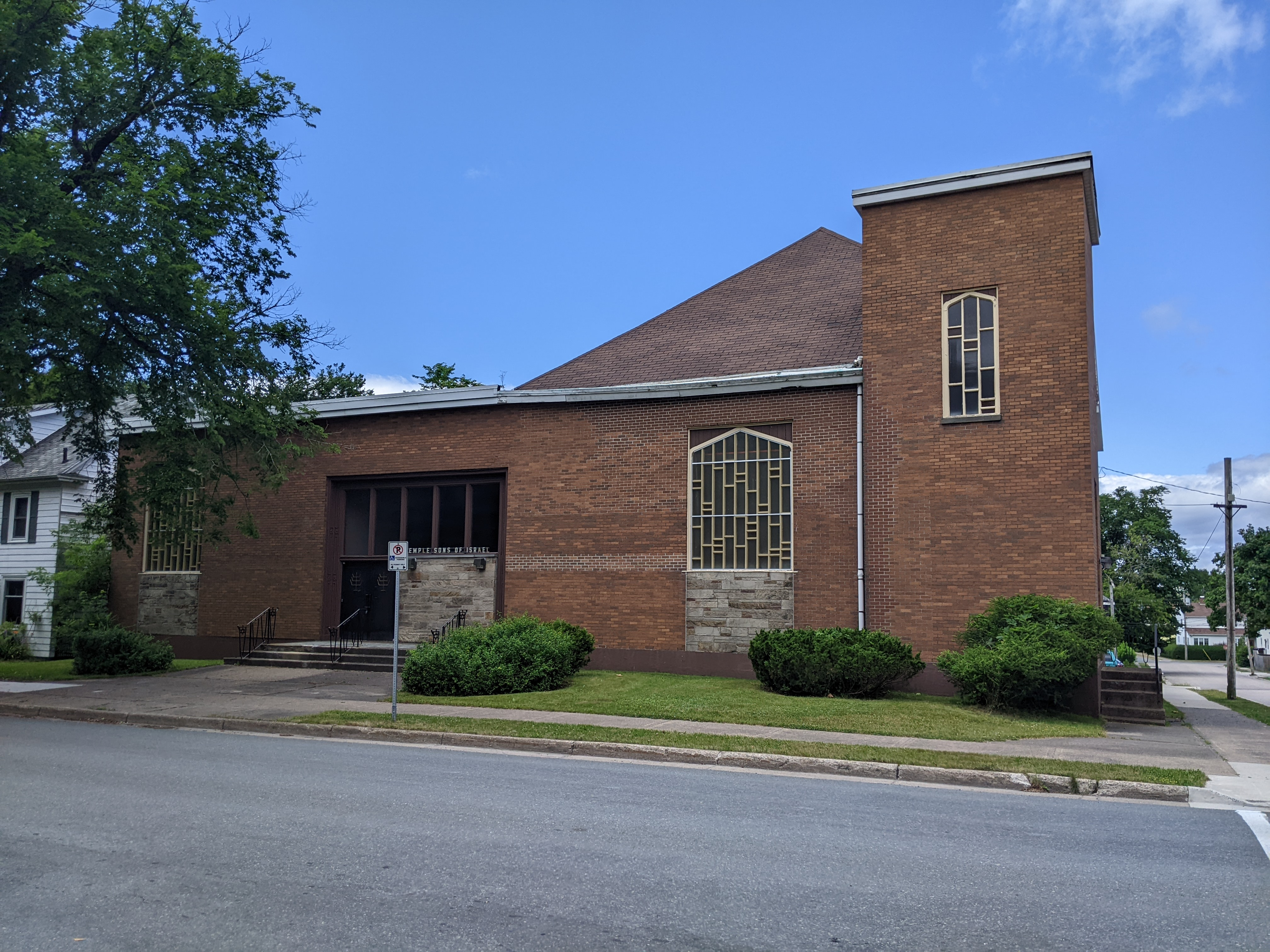

Religion
- Affiliation: Conservative Judaism
- Year consecrated: 1919
- Status: Active

Location
- Location: 55 Whitney Ave; Sydney, Nova Scotia, Canada; B1P 4Z7
- Interactive map of Temple Sons of Israel
- Coordinates: 46.1323°N 60.1843°W

Website
- www.jewishcapebreton.ca/sydney/

Temple Sons of Israel is a synagogue in Sydney, Nova Scotia. It is the only active synagogue in Cape Breton. The congregation was established in 1919.
