= Radlett Reform Synagogue =

Reform synagogue in Hertfordshire, England

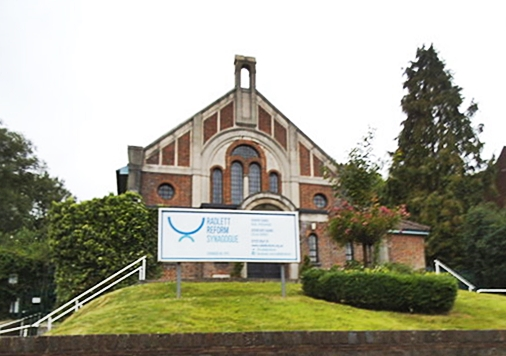
- The former church, now synagogue, in 2018

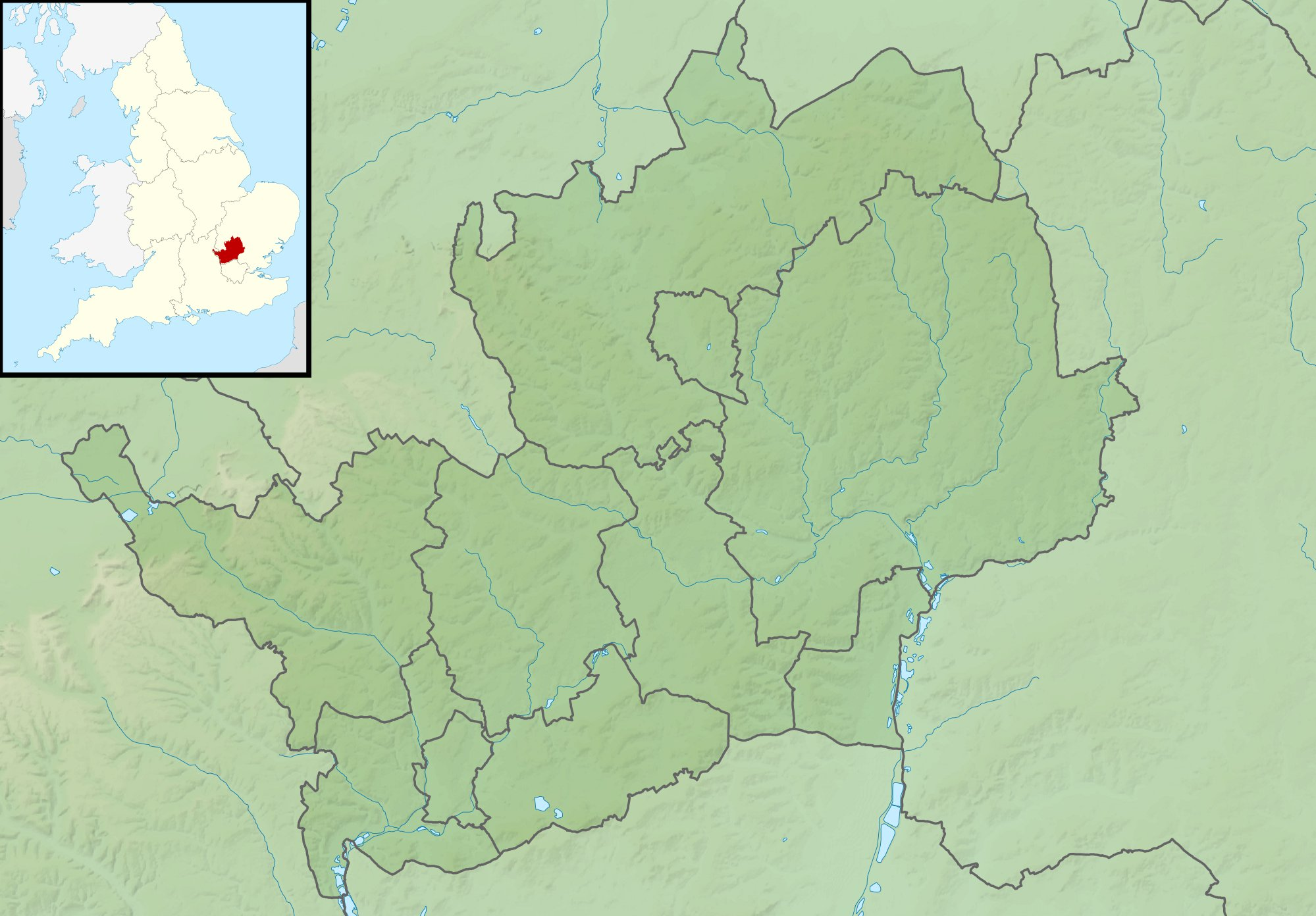
- Location of the synagogue in Hertfordshire

Religion
- Affiliation: Reform Judaism
- Ecclesiastical or organizational status: Synagogue
- Leadership: Paul Freedman; David-Yehuda Stern (Associate)
- Status: Active

Location
- Location: 118 Watling Street, Radlett, Hertfordshire, England WD7 7AA
- Country: United Kingdom
- Interactive map of Radlett Reform Synagogue
- Coordinates: 51°41′00″N 0°19′03″W

Architecture
- Established: 1971 (as a congregation)
- Completed: unknown (as a church); 1978 (as a synagogue)

Website
- radlettreform.org.uk

The Radlett Reform Synagogue is a Reform Jewish congregation and synagogue in Radlett, Hertfordshire, England, in the United Kingdom. Formed in 1971 as the Bushey Heath Reform Community, the congregation is a member of the Movement for Reform Judaism.

The congregation's Senior Rabbi, since 2004, is Paul Freedman, a previous Chair of the Assembly of Reform Rabbis and Cantors. Rabbi David-Yehuda Stern has served as Associate Rabbi since July 2022. From 1984 to 1990 Barbara Borts was a rabbi at Radlett Reform Synagogue, making her the first woman rabbi to have a pulpit of her own in a UK Reform Judaism synagogue. She was succeeded by Rabbi Alexandra Wright, who held the pulpit from 1989 to 2003.

== See also ==
- History of the Jews in England
- List of Jewish communities in the United Kingdom
- List of synagogues in the United Kingdom
