= Darlington Hebrew Congregation =

Reform Judaism congregation in Darlington, County Durham, England

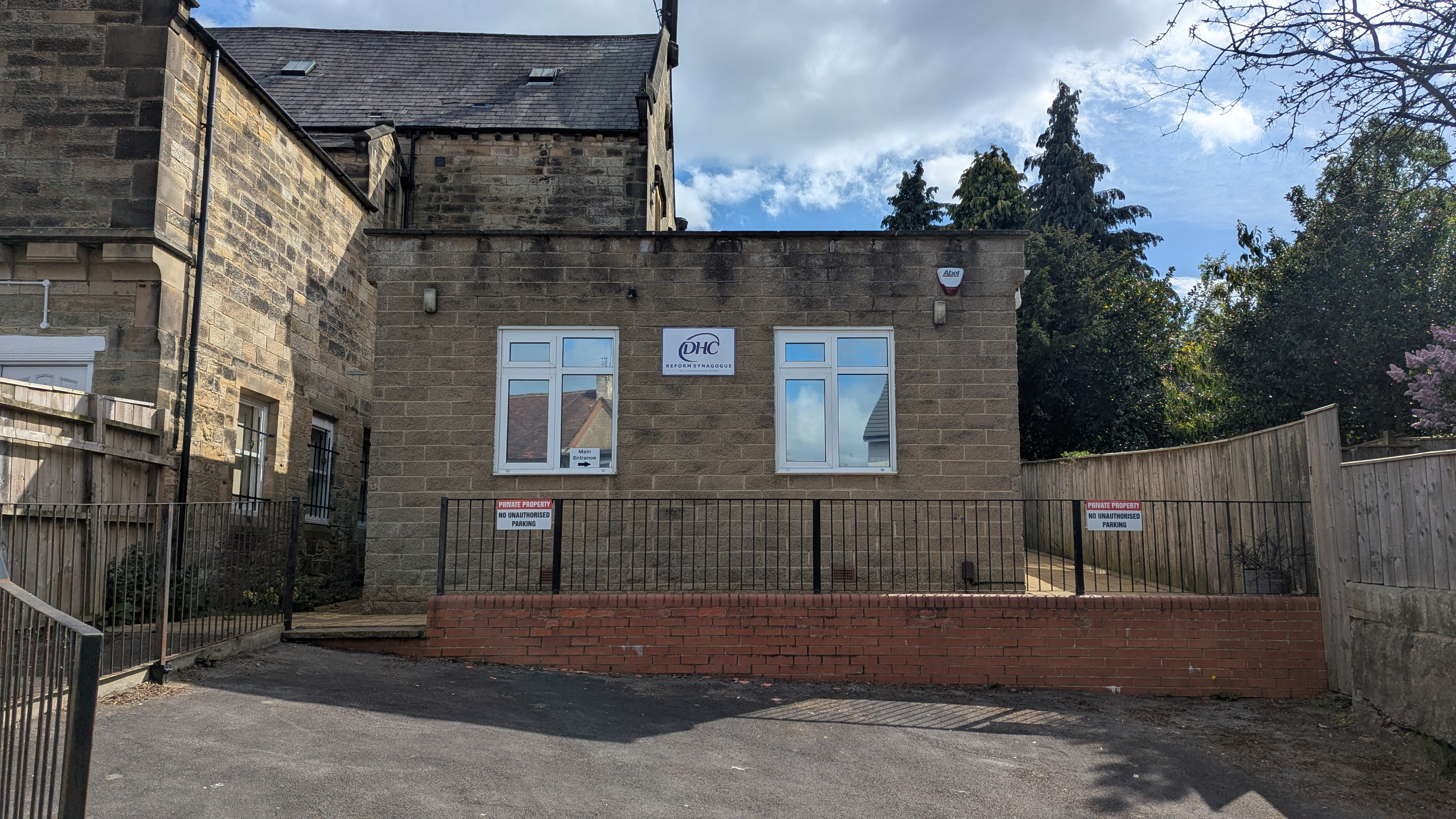
- The synagogue in [YYYY]

- Location of the synagogue in North East England

Religion
- Affiliation: Reform Judaism
- Ecclesiastical or organizational status: Synagogue
- Status: Active

Location
- Location: 15 Bloomfield Road, Darlington, County Durham, England DL3 6RZ
- Country: United Kingdom
- Interactive map of Darlington Hebrew Congregation
- Coordinates: 54°31′55″N 1°34′11″W

Architecture
- Established: 1904 (as a congregation)
- Completed: 1930 (Victoria Road); 1967 (13 Bloomfield); 2007 (15 Bloomfield)

Website
- dhcreform.org

The Darlington Hebrew Congregation, commonly known as DHC Reform Synagogue, is a Reform Jewish congregation and synagogue, located at 15 Bloomfield Road in Darlington, County Durham, in the north-east of England, in the United Kingdom.

Formed in 1904 as an Orthodox community that worshiped in the Ashkenazi rite, the congregation has been a member of the Movement for Reform Judaism since c. 1988. The congregation has a historic and a current burial ground at West Cemetery, Carmel Road North, Darlington.

Shabbat services are held monthly.

== See also ==
Logo of the congregation

- History of the Jews in North East England
- List of Jewish communities in the United Kingdom
- List of synagogues in the United Kingdom
