= Germantown Jewish Centre =

Conservative synagogue in Philadelphia, Pennsylvania

- Location in Philadelphia

Religion
- Affiliation: Conservative Judaism
- Ecclesiastical or organisational status: Synagogue and community centre
- Leadership: Rabbi Adam Zeff; Rabbi Leonard Gordon (Emeritus)
- Status: Active

Location
- Location: 400 West Ellet Street, Mount Airy, Philadelphia, Pennsylvania
- Country: United States
- Administration: United Synagogue of Conservative Judaism
- Coordinates: 40°03′06″N 75°11′40″W

Architecture
- Established: 1936

Website
- germantownjewishcentre.org

The Germantown Jewish Centre is a Conservative synagogue located in the Mount Airy neighborhood of Philadelphia, Pennsylvania, in the United States. Established in 1936, the synagogue is affiliated with the United Synagogue of Conservative Judaism.

The centre is home to multiple, distinct prayer communities including The Charry Service, which meets in the main sanctuary, Minyan Masorti, an egalitarian version of a traditional service, and Dorshei Derekh, a Reconstructionist minyan.

== Founding of the synagogue ==
The centre was founded in 1936 after an organizational dinner on September 28, 1936, at the Benjamin Franklin spurred efforts to form a committee and raise funds to start a Jewish Community Centre in Northwest Philadelphia. Space was rented at 6815 Emlen St., formerly the Pehlam Club, which later became the Commodore Barry Club. Edward Polisher was one of the founders and its first President. By 1937, 300 families had joined. A Sunday and Hebrew school were first priority with 85 children ages 5–14 enrolling. Adult education lectures and classes with topics such as current events, contemporary Jewish life, Palestine, Bible, and Hebrew language were also offered. In addition, an art department was formed where classes in sculpture, drawing, dancing and photography were available as well as a junior organization to support youth activities and community. By 1940, a Women's Club was organized and the Centre Institute for Adult Jewish Studies had been established. Women as well as men served on the centre's board of directors. Construction of its own building began in 1947, starting with the school wing before the synagogue. The synagogue building was completed in 1954.

Solomon Grayzel was the synagogue's first spiritual leader, followed by Rabbi Leon S. Lang in 1939, and Rabbi Elias Charry in 1942.

== Rabbinic leadership ==
Rabbi Elias Charry, a graduate of the City College of New York and the Teachers' Institute of the Jewish Theological Seminary (1930), served the congregation from 1942 until 1973, when he was accorded emeritus status. A leader in the Conservative movement, Rabbi Charry often took on the role of spokesman for the Jewish community, working to stem the white flight to the suburbs and to ease racial tensions and improve community relations. In the 1960s, as upwardly mobile Black families moved into Germantown and Mount Airy, Rabbi Charry with other local ministers, actively worked to discourage white residents from leaving. Under Charry's guidance, the Centre chose to remain in the neighborhood rather than relocate to the suburbs, a path many other synagogues in Mount Airy and beyond followed during that time. When in 1974 a group of young Jews began to gather chavurah-style in the own minyan, Charry allowed them to meet in the centre. The Germantown minyan, as it became known, drew young Jews to the centre and the neighborhood who might not have been inclined to join a traditional Conservative synagogue. This minyan eventually split into two distinct minyans which continued to meet at the synagogue.

In 1978, Sanford Hahn was hired as rabbi of the Centre where he served until 1994. He was known for his interfaith work in the community, building bridges with African-Americans and non-Jews. During his tenure, the Centre started a Ralph P. Granger Memorial service and lecture, to memorialize the interreligious, interfaith values of Ralph Granger, a Christian African-American who was the maintenance supervisor of the synagogue for 35 years until his death in 1982.

In 1994, Rabbi Leonard Gordon was hired to replace Hahn. With a teaching-oriented background, the Centre offered him the opportunity to fully utilize his educational, pastoral, administrative, and community-building expertise. His goal was to foster unity while respecting each minyan's independence and to bring the community together through engaged learning, open dialogue, and vibrant worship. Gordon left the Centre in 2010, moving to Boston when his wife Lori Lefkovitz became director of Jewish studies at Northeastern University. Rabbi Adam Zeff was installed as the centre's rabbi in 2012. He had begun his service to the synagogue as a student rabbi in 2002.

== Multi-minyan origins ==
The Germantown Minyan was started in 1974 by Rachel Falkove, Michael Masch, Rivkah Walton and others. Part of Walton's motivation as an original founder was to help create a "Jewish Koinonia". Shortly after its first meeting, Rabbi Charry allowed it to meet in a room in the synagogue. The minyan grew and attracted new residents to Mount Airy, and within a few years there were 90 adult members and about 25 children. Germantown Minyan members were part of a network of East Coast havurot that met several times a year from the early 1970s until 1981 at Weiss’ Farm in New Jersey and later at Fellowship Farm near Philadelphia, in Pottstown, PA. These networks formed a basis for the National Havurah Committee (NHC), and minyan members participated in NHC events and leadership.

By 1987, the minyan had split into two separate minyans. The more traditional group, dubbed the “206 Minyan” after the room in which it davvened, changed rooms and renamed itself Minyan Masorti. The other group, which was more open to liturgical creativity, named itself Dorshei Derekh. Both minyans combined liberal principles, like democratic organization and feminism, with traditional rituals and practices. While their ceremonies varied, both rejected performance-style services featuring an organ, choir, rabbi, and cantor. Instead, members shared the responsibility of leading and contributing to the service, with women participating equally alongside men.

== Dorshei Derekh ==
Dorshei Derekh, transliterated from Hebrew as "Seekers of a Way", is a Reconstructionist minyan that had its origins in the Germantown Minyan. The choice of the name was influenced by the Jerusalem congregation Kehillat Mevakshei Derech, a Reconstructionist-influenced community that was then independent, more recently affiliated with the Reform movement. Dorshei Derekh's participatory, lay-led services, largely in Hebrew and including Torah discussions involving personal reflections, were part of a national trend of havurot and minyanim as alternatives to formal synagogue services.

In the mid-1990s, a defining decision was made regarding the role of non-Jewish family members and guests at services. The minyan formally affiliated with the Reconstructionist movement. This entailed defining minyan membership, establishing a formal decision-making process for controversial decisions, providing outside facilitators, and conducting discussions with the Germantown Jewish Centre. The minyan subsequently joined the Jewish Reconstructionist Federation in 1999. Germantown Jewish Centre members once viewed members of Dorshei Derekh as “those other people” but later the minyan came to be seen as a key part of the congregation. Many Germantown Jewish Centre committee chairs, officers, and board members have come from Dorshei Derekh, including three congregational presidents, Helen Feinberg (2002–04), Rachel Falkove (2004–06), and Mitch Marcus (2012–14). In addition, minyan members are involved in education and social action projects with the wider congregation.

The minyan itself has constituted a caring community, providing meals and other support for members with illness and at times of loss or of births. This support is based on community connection, not only on who is a close personal friend. The minyan has always attempted to welcome newcomers, but the transient situations of many in the community have made that challenging. The minyan has encouraged people to acquire new liturgical and leadership skills. There have always been considerable numbers of people in the minyan with substantial Jewish knowledge, enriching the community. While many of these are Reconstructionist rabbis and rabbinical students, there are also very knowledgeable lay people. This has made it possible for many to take part in leading the group and in adding to the ideas in discussions.

=== Customs and practice ===
Some practices inherited from the Germantown Minyan, or created in the early years, have influenced the minyan over two decades. Other minhagim grew over the decades. Leadership of the minyan rotates every year with a coordinator, past coordinator and coordinator-elect forming a three-person mazkirut for decisions which need to be made before the next scheduled quarterly minyan meeting. In general, the minyan coordinator position is filled alternately by women and men.

Shabbat morning and festival services involve a number of key minhagim. The minyan arranges its space in a circle or semicircle, which emphasizes community rather than a leader. Services include a good deal of Hebrew, with English readings or interpretations sometimes added by a leader. Pesukei dezimra with much singing are often emphasized. The Amidah includes the matriarchs, and some participants phrase blessings in alternative or feminine Hebrew. The minyan originally used the Conservative Silverman siddur with unwritten modifications, but after the Reconstructionist siddur Kol Haneshamah was published in 1994, it was adopted by the minyan. The Musaf service is an additional reading, poem, or story rather than another service. The service concludes with introductions, announcements, and a member-provided kiddush. Occasionally a longer lunch and discussion follow services.

The Torah reading is done on a triennial cycle, typically with three (rather than seven) aliyot. A key part of the Torah service is the mi sheberakh blessings, as people volunteer for aliyot to mark events in their lives and receive recognition from the community: birthdays, new jobs, new academic ventures, arriving and departing for Israel, departing for college, a yahrzeit, a new apartment or home. These combined Hebrew and English individual prayers are a way the minyan shares news and support. While officially retaining it as an option, Dorshei Derekh generally omits the haftarah (prophetic reading) except for a few times a year, with the exception of the monthly women's haftarah project during the 1990s. Its omission allows for a longer Torah discussion, which follows a d’var Torah. The minyan avoids centralized leadership in these discussions by having each speaker call on the next person. For 20 years, speakers alternated between men and women to assure gender equality, until this practice was suspended as an experiment in the summer of 2006. If there were more women present than men, a step originated to advance women's participation might actually limit it.

== See also ==
- History of the Jews in Pennsylvania
