= Hatikvah Synagogue =

Conservative synagogue in Santiago, Cuba

Sinagoga de la Communidad Hebrea Hatikva
- Location of the synagogue in Cuba

Religion
- Affiliation: Conservative Judaism
- Rite: Sephardi
- Ecclesiastical or organizational status: Synagogue: 1924–1960; since 1993
- Status: Active

Location
- Location: Mariano Corona No. 273 e/ Habana y Maceo, Santiago
- Country: Cuba
- Interactive map of Sinagoga de la Communidad Hebrea Hatikva
- Coordinates: 20°01′29″N 75°49′19″W

Architecture
- Established: As a congregation: 1924; 1993
- Completed: 1939

Website
- jewishcuba.org/hatikva/hatiksp.html (in Spanish)

The Sinagoga de la Communidad Hebrea Hatikva is a Conservative Jewish congregation and synagogue, located in Santiago, Cuba.

== History ==
The first Jewish community in Santiago was founded October 1924. It was called the Jewish Society of Eastern Cuba (Spanish: Sociedad Union Israelita de Oriente de Cuba) and was composed mainly of Sephardic Jews from Turkey. In 1939, the congregation built its first synagogue, called the Synagogue of Santiago de Cuba (Spanish: Sinagoga de Santiago de Cuba). Ashkenazi Jews arrived from Poland during World War II. The congregation remained active until 1959, and the synagogue was closed in 1960.

After years of inactivity, the congregation was established in October 1993. Worshipping initially from a private residence, the former synagogue building was reopened on July 25, 1995, and was consecrated by Rabbi Sh'muel Szteinhendle.

It was the first Jewish congregation to host a website in Cuba.

== See also ==
- History of the Jews in Cuba
- List of synagogues in Cuba
