= Newcastle Reform Synagogue =

Reform synagogue in Newcastle, England

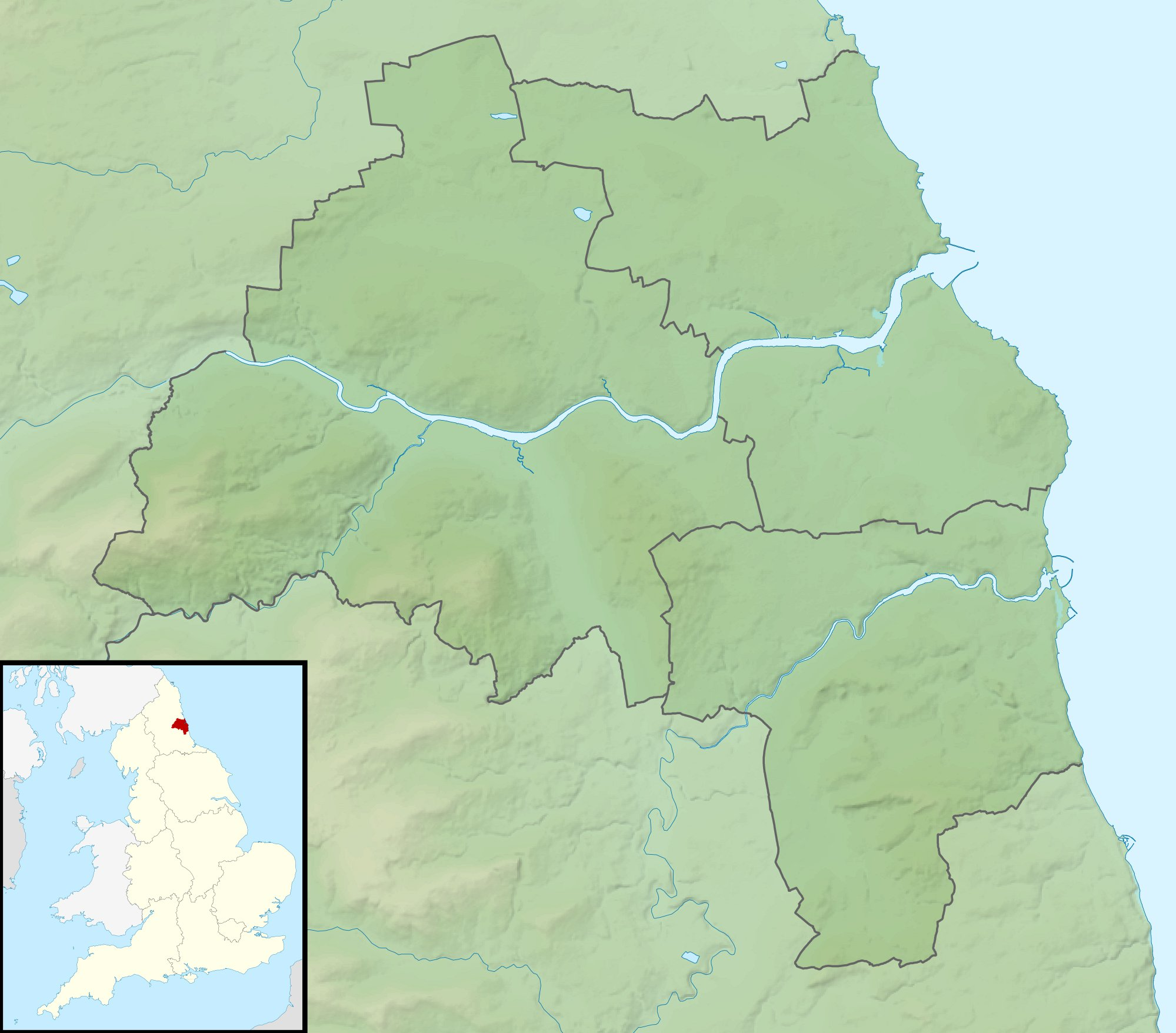
- Location of the synagogue in Tyne and Wear

Religion
- Affiliation: Reform Judaism
- Ecclesiastical or organizational status: Synagogue
- Leadership: Rabbi Sybil Sheridan
- Status: Active

Location
- Location: The Croft, off Kenton Road, Newcastle upon Tyne, England NE3 4RF
- Country: United Kingdom
- Interactive map of Newcastle Reform Synagogue
- Coordinates: 55°00′08″N 1°38′24″W

Architecture
- Established: 1963 (as a congregation)
- Completed: 1982

Website
- newcastlereformsynagogue.co.uk

The Newcastle Reform Synagogue (transliterated from Hebrew as Ner Tamid, lit. "Everlasting Light"), is a Reform Jewish congregation and synagogue, located in Gosforth in Newcastle-upon-Tyne, England, in the United Kingdom. Founded in 1963, the congregation is a member of the Movement for Reform Judaism.

== History ==
The community was founded in 1963 by European-Jewish refugees. After about twenty families had shown interest the previous year in forming a Reform congregation, assistance was sought from the nearest Reform synagogue, Sinai Synagogue, Leeds, who lent a Torah scroll and some prayer books. Services were held in homes, school rooms and church halls.

In 1963 the newly formed congregation bought a Methodist chapel in Derby Street, off Barrack Road, in Newcastle. This was converted into a synagogue, function hall, school rooms and a caretaker's flat, and the congregation grew. However, eleven years later, the congregation was served with a Compulsory Purchase Order and had to abandon the building. For the next ten years the community held regular services as before, in homes, school halls and church halls. On High Holy Days it used the Newcastle City Council Chambers.

The present purpose-built synagogue was completed in 1982. A dedicated cemetery in North Shields has a prayer house, complete with facilities for tahara.

== See also ==
- History of the Jews in North East England
- List of Jewish communities in the United Kingdom
- List of synagogues in the United Kingdom
