= European Judaism (journal) =

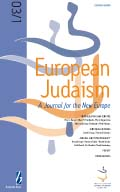
- Discipline: Judaism studies
- Language: English
- Edited by: Jonathan Magonet

Publication details
- History: 1968–present
- Publisher: Berghahn Books in association with the Leo Baeck College and the Michael Goulston Education Foundation
- Frequency: Biannually

Standard abbreviations
- ISO 4: Eur. Jud.

Indexing
- ISSN: 0014-3006 (print); 1752-2323 (web)
- LCCN: 79007340
- OCLC no.: 02309096

Links
- Journal homepage; Online archives

European Judaism: A Journal for the New Europe is a biannual academic journal published by Berghahn Books in association with the Leo Baeck College and the Michael Goulston Education Foundation. It was established in 1968 and covers Judaism studies concerning Judaism in Europe. The editor-in-chief is Jonathan Magonet.

== Abstracting and indexing ==
European Judaism is indexed and abstracted in:

- ATLA Religion Database
- Educational Resources Information Center
- Index for Jewish Periodicals
- Index of Articles on Jewish Studies
- Infotrac
- International Bibliography of Periodical Literature
- International Bibliography of Book Reviews of Scholarly Literature on the Humanities and Social Sciences
- International Bibliography of Periodicals
- MLA International Bibliography
- Social Service Abstracts
- Sociological Abstracts
- TOC Premier
