= List of synagogues =

This is a list of synagogues around the world.

== A ==
- Afghanistan: Charshi Torabazein Synagogue (Kabul), Yu Aw Synagogue (Herat)
- Albania: Valona Synagogue (Vlorë)
- Argentina: Mishkan - Centro de Espiritualidad Judía (Buenos Aires), Templo Libertad (Buenos Aires), Comunidad Sefardí de Buenos Aires (Templo de Camargo) https://www.sefardi.ar/, Menora, Organización Judial Mundial para la Juventud ([Buenos Aires]) https://menora.org.ar/, Comunidad Chalom ([Buenos Aires]).
- Armenia: Mordechai Navi Synagogue (Yerevan)
- Aruba: Beth Israel Synagogue (Oranjestad)
- Australia: Emanuel Synagogue (Sydney)
- Austria: Hietzinger Synagoge (Vienna), Leopoldstädter Tempel (Vienna), Pazmanitentempel (Vienna), Polnische Schul (Vienna), Stadttempel (Vienna), Synagoge Neudeggergasse (Vienna), Türkischer Tempel (Vienna), Währinger Tempel (Vienna)
- Azerbaijan: see List of synagogues in Azerbaijan

== B ==
- (The Bahamas) Bahamas: Luis de Torres Synagogue (Freeport)
- Bahrain: Bahrain Synagogue (Manama)
- Barbados: Nidhe Israel Synagogue (Bridgetown)
- Belarus: Choral Synagogue (Brest), Great Synagogue (Grodno), Slonim Synagogue (Slonim), Wołpa Synagogue (Vowpa)
- Belgium: Hollandse Synagogue (Antwerp), Great Synagogue of Europe (Brussels), Synagogue of Liège (Liège)
- Bolivia: Circulo Israelita de Bolivia (La Paz)
- Bosnia and Herzegovina: Sarajevo Synagogue (Sarajevo), Doboj Synagogue (Doboj)
- Brazil: Congregação Israelita Paulista (São Paulo), Kahal Zur Israel Synagogue (Recife), Sha'ar Hashamayim Synagogue (Belém), Centro Israelita do Paraná (Curitiba),
- Bulgaria: see List of synagogues in Bulgaria

== C ==
- Canada: see List of synagogues in Canada
- Chile: Sinagoga Jafetz Jaim, Aish HaTorah, Jabad, Comunidad Jaredi Jazon Ishh (Santiago)
- China: Ohel Leah Synagogue (Hong Kong), Ohel Rachel Synagogue (Shanghai)
- Colombia: Sinagoga Shaare Sedek (Barranquilla), Bet El (Barranquilla), Adat Israel (Bogotá), Bet Or (Medellín)
- Costa Rica: Centro Israelita Sionista (San José)
- Croatia: List of synagogues in Croatia
- Cuba: Adath Israel (Havana), Beth Shalom Temple (Havana), Centro Hebreo Sefaradi (Havana), Chevet Achim (Havana), Communida Hebrea Tifereth Israel (Camagüey), Communidad Hebrea Hatikva (Santiago de Cuba)
- Cyprus: Larnaca Synagogue (Larnaca)
- Czech Republic: Great Synagogue (Plzeň), Old New Synagogue (Prague), Pinkas Synagogue (Prague), Maisel Synagogue (Prague), Klausová Synagogue (Prague), Jubilee Synagogue (also known as the Jerusalem Synagogue) (Prague), Front Synagogue (Třebíč), Rear Synagogue (Třebíč), Šach Synagogue (Holešov).

== D ==
- Democratic Republic of the Congo: Beth Yaakow (Kinshasa). There is an early 20th-century synagogue, still functioning, in central Lubumbashi, DRC.
- Denmark: Great Synagogue (Copenhagen)
- Dominican Republic: Beth Midrash Sefardí Nidhe Israel (Santo Domingo) Centro Israelita de República Dominicana (Santo Domingo) and Sosua Synagogue (Sosua).

== E ==
- Egypt: see List of synagogues in Egypt
- El Salvador: Comunidad Israelita de El Salvador (San Salvador)
- Eritrea: Asmara Synagogue (Asmara)
- Ethiopia: Succat Rahamim Synagogue (Addis Ababa)
- Estonia: Beit Bella Synagogue (Tallinn)

== F ==
- Finland: Helsinki Synagogue (Helsinki), Turku Synagogue (Turku)
- France: Grand Synagogue of Paris (Paris), Agoudas Hakehilos Synagogue (Paris), Sedan Synagogue (Sedan), Beth Meir Synagogue (Bastia).

== G ==
- (Georgia (country)) Georgia: Great Synagogue (Tbilisi); Oni Synagogue (Oni)
- Germany: Fasanenstrasse synagogue (Berlin); New Synagogue (Berlin); Rykestrasse Synagogue (Berlin); Alte Synagoge (Essen); New Synagogue, Dresden; Ohel Jakob synagogue (Munich); Regensburg Synagogue; Roonstrasse Synagogue (Cologne);Synagogue Selm-Bork.
- Gibraltar: Shaar HaShamayim (The Great Synagogue), Nefusot Yehuda, Etz Haim, Abudarham Synagogue
- Greece: Beth Shalom Synagogue (Athens, Greece) (Athens), Chalkis Synagogue (Chalcis), Beth Shalom Synagogue (Chania), Etz Hayyim Synagogue (Chania), Corfu Synagogue (Corfu), Ioanniotiki Synagogue (Ioannina), Kahal Shalom Synagogue (Rhodes), Monastir Synagogue (Thessaloniki), Etz Haim Synagogue (Larissa), Patras Synagogue (Patras), Trikala Synagogue (Trikala), Volos Synagogue (Volos)
- Guatemala: Chabad of pedro la laguna (lake atitlan) Sinagoga Maguen David (Guatemala City), Asociacion Reformista de Guatemala Adat Israel

== H ==
- Honduras: Maguen David Synagogue, Comunidad Judia Ortodoxa Ohr Chaim de Premishlan and Synagogue(San Pedro Sula), Shevet Ajim Synagogue (Tegucigalpa)
- Hungary: see List of synagogues in Hungary

== I ==
- India. Mumbai: Knesset Eliyahoo, Magen David, Tifferth Israel, Etz Haeem, Shaar Rason, Shaar Haramamin. In the suburbs of Mumbai there are two synagogues at Thana and Kurla. In the Konkan region of Maharashtra there are ten synagogue buildings (including those in Pen, Panvel, and a string of small towns and villages, but most are no longer or irregularly functioning, yet the buildings remain in adequate condition.
- Indonesia: Beth Hashem Synagogue (Manado), Sinagoge Ohel Yaakov, Manado (Manado), Surabaya Synagogue (Surabaya), Sha'ar Hashamayim Synagogue (Tondano).
- Iran
- Iraq: Great Synagogue (Baghdad), Meir Taweig Synagogue (Baghdad)
- (Republic of Ireland) Ireland: Machzekei Hadas Synagogue (Dublin)
- Israel:
- Italy: Tempio Maggiore (Rome), Central Synagogue of Milan (Milan), Synagogue of Turin (Turin), Synagogue of Bologna (Bologna), Sinagoga di Firenze (Florence), Italian Synagogue (Venice). See also: List of synagogues in Italy

== J ==
- Jamaica: Shaare Shalom Synagogue (Kingston)
- Japan: Ohel Shelomoh Synagogue (Kobe)
- Jordan: Gerasa Synagogue (Jerash)

== K ==
- Kazakhstan: Beit Rachel Synagogue, Astana (Nur-Sultan)
- Kenya: Nairobi Hebrew Congregation (Nairobi). The former synagogue in Nakuru is now a Christian orphanage.
- Kyrgyzstan: Hesed Tikva Synagogue (Bishkek)

== L ==
- Latvia: Peitav Synagogue (Riga)
- Lebanon: Maghen Avraham Synagogue (Beirut), Sidon Synagogue (Sidon), Bhamdoun synagogue (Bhamdoun), Ohel Jacob Synagogue (Aley), Deir el Qamar Synagogue, (Deir el Qamar)
- Libya: Chala Lakhbira, Great Synagogue, Char Bishi Synagogue (Tripoli), Yifrin Synagogue (Yifrin), Slat Abn Shaif Synagogue (Zliten)
- Lithuania: Great Synagogue of Vilnius, Choral Synagogue (Vilnius), Kaunas Synagogue (Kaunas)
- Luxembourg: Canal Synagogue, Great Synagogue

== M ==
- Malta: New Synagogue (Valletta)
- Mexico: see List of synagogues in Mexico
- Monaco:
- Morocco: see List of synagogues in Morocco
- Myanmar: Musmeah Yeshua Synagogue (Yangon)

== N ==
- Namibia: Windhoek Hebrew Congregation (Windhoek). The former synagogue in Keetmanshoop is now the headquarters for a local dairy.
- Netherlands: Amsterdam Esnoga (Amsterdam), Aalten Synagogue (Aalten)
- Netherlands Antilles: Mikve Israel-Emanuel (Curaçao)
- New Zealand: Temple Beth-El (Christchurch)
- Nigeria: Gihon Synagogue (Abuja), Synagogue Church of All Nations
- North Macedonia: Bet Yaakov Synagogue (Skopje)
- Norway: Oslo Synagogue (Oslo), Trondheim Synagogue (Trondheim)

== P ==
- Pakistan: Magain Shalome Synagogue (Karachi)
- (Palestine) Palestinian National Authority: Shalom Al Yisrael Synagogue (Jericho), Abraham Temple (Gaza Strip), Gaza Synagogue (Rimal)
- Panama: Kol Shearit Israel Temple, Shevet Achim Synagogue, Beth El Synagogue (Panama City)
- Paraguay: Asunción Synagogue (Asunción), Beit Jabad Paraguay (Asunción)
- Peru: Sociedad de Beneficencia Israelita (Lima)
- Philippines: Beth Yaacov Synagogue (Makati)
- Poland: see List of synagogues in Poland Unfortunately this list has been moved to draft space and will probably be deleted in a couple of months. For a similar list with more than 230 synagogues see: List of synagogues in Poland
- Portugal: Kadoorie Synagogue (Porto), Beit Eliyahu (Belmonte), Synagogue of Tomar (Tomar), Lisbon Synagogue (Lisbon), Sahar Hassamaim Synagogue (Ponta Delgada).

== R ==
- Romania: see List of synagogues in Romania
- Russia: see List of synagogues in Russia

== S ==
- Serbia: see List of synagogues in Serbia
- Singapore: Chesed-El Synagogue, Maghain Aboth Synagogue
- Slovakia: see List of synagogues in Slovakia
- Slovenia: Maribor Synagogue (Maribor), Lendava Synagogue (Lendava)
- South Africa: Tikvath Israel Synagogue (Cape Town)
- Spain: Cominidad Israelita de Barcelona (Barcelona), Benidorm Synagogue (Alicante), Synagogue Jacob Almonznino (Melilla), Synagogue Issac Benarroch (Melilla), Synagogue Solinquinos (Melilla), Beth El Synagogue (Marbella), Beth Yaacov Synagogue (Madrid), Ner Tamid Synagogue (A Coruña), Synagogue of El Transito (Toledo), Beth Minzi Synagogue (Torremolinos), La Javurá Sinagoga (Valencia), Main Synagogue of Barcelona (Barcelona)
- Sri Lanka: Chabad of Sri Lanka (Colombo)
- Sudan: Hekhal Shelomo Synagogue (Khartoum)
- Suriname: Neveh Shalom Synagogue (Paramaribo)
- Sweden: Gothenburg Synagogue (Gothenburg), Stockholm Synagogue (Stockholm), Malmö Synagogue (Malmö)
- Switzerland: Beth Yaakov Synagogue (Geneva), Hekhal Haness Synagogue (Geneva), Endingen Synagogue (Endingen, Switzerland), Lengnau Synagogue (Lengnau, Aargau), Synagoge Zürich Löwenstrasse (Zürich), Bern Synagogue (Bern)
- Syria: Midrash Dishi Synagogue (Damascus), Dura-Europos synagogue (Dura-Europos), Ilfrange Synagogue (Damascus), Jamiliah Synagogue (Aleppo), Central Synagogue of Aleppo (Aleppo), Jobar Synagogue of Elijah the prophet (Damascus), Kittab Attia (Damascus), Menarsha Synagogue (Damascus), Minyan Synagogue (Damascus), Racqy Synagogue (Damascus), Scalyn Synagogue (Damascus), Shama'a Synagogue (Damascus), Tedef Synagogue of Ezra the scribe (Tedef)

== T ==
- (French Polynesia) Tahiti: Ahava v'Ahava Synagogue (Papeete)
- Taiwan: Landis Taipei Hotel Synagogue. Chabad Taiwan (Taipei)
- Tajikistan: Dushanbe synagogue (Dushanbe)
- Thailand: Beth Elisheva Synagogue (Bangkok), Even Chen Synagogue (Bangkok)
- Tunisia: Beit Knesset Kohanim HaDintreisa (Djerba), El Ghriba synagogue (Djerba), Zarzis Synagogue (Zarzis)
- Turkey: see List of synagogues in Turkey
- Turkmenistan: Ashkhabad Synagogue (Ashgabat)

== U ==
- Uganda: Moses Synagogue (Nabugoye), Putti Synagogue (Putti), Namutumba Synagogue (Magada, Namutumba District), Nasenyi Synagogue (Nesenyi), Namanyonyi Synagogue (Namanyonyi)
- Ukraine: see List of synagogues in Ukraine
- United Kingdom: see List of synagogues in the United Kingdom
- United States: see List of synagogues in the United States
- Uruguay: see List of synagogues in Uruguay
- Uzbekistan: Central Synagogue Beit Menahem (Tashkent), Gumbaz Synagogue (Samarkand)

== V ==
- Venezuela:Tiféret Israel, Hogar Jabad Lubavitch de Venezuela, Unión Israelita de Caracas, Asociación Bet El, Congregación Bet Aharón, Tiféret Israel del Este Keter Torá, Centro Bet Shemuel, Shaaré Shalom, Centro Bet Shemuel del Este, (Caracas); Asociación Israelita de Valencia, (Valencia); Sociedad Israelita de Maracaibo, (Maracaibo); Or Meir, (Porlamar)
- Vietnam: Chabad of Vietnam (Ho Chi Minh City)
- (United States Virgin Islands) Virgin Islands, US: Beracha Veshalom Vegmiluth Hasidim Synagogue (Saint Thomas)

== Y ==
- Yemen: Grand synagogue of Aden (Aden), Kessar Synagogue, Dhamari Synagogue (Sanaa)

== Z ==
- Zambia: Lusaka Synagogue (Lusaka). There were once synagogues in Ndola, Kitwe, and Mufulira, Zambia of the Copperbelt Region, but they are now African churches. Ndola's former synagogue, now used by the Catholic Church as offices, and they built a new prayer space for church services. In Kitwe, the former synagogue is today owned and operated by the Salvation Army. The synagogue in Livingstone is also now an African church. There was once a Jewish community in the Copperbelt Region town of Luwansha, but it is unclear whether any former synagogue was built and still stands.
- Zimbabwe: Bulawayo Hebrew Congregation (Bulawayo), Harare Hebrew Congregation (Harare). There were once three synagogues in the Midlands region of the country—in Kadoma (building destroyed), Kitwe (building used by an African church, and Gewru (building used as a church today).

== See also ==
- Judaism by country
- List of Conservative synagogues
- List of Humanistic synagogues
- List of Orthodox synagogues
- List of Reconstructionist synagogues
- List of Reform synagogues
