= Ashkenazi Synagogue of Tbilisi =

Orthodox synagogue in Tbilisi, Georgia (country)

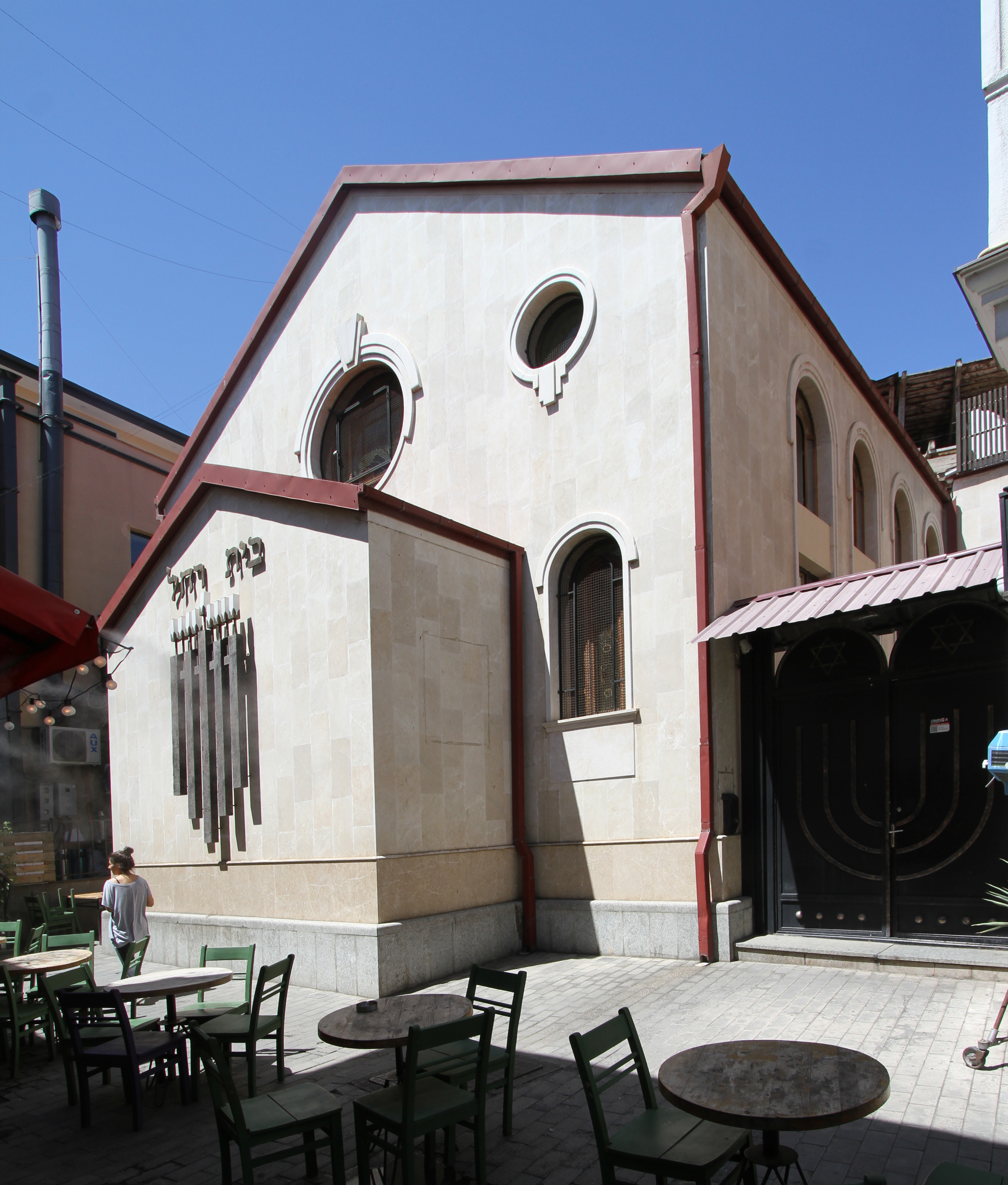

- Location of the synagogue in Georgia

Religion
- Affiliation: Orthodox Judaism
- Rite: Nusach Ashkenaz; Georgian Jewish
- Ecclesiastical or organisational status: Synagogue
- Status: Active

Location
- Location: 13 TKavi I Dead End, Tbilisi
- Country: Georgia
- Coordinates: 41°41′34″N 44°48′23″E

Architecture
- Completed: c. 1910s; 2009 (rebuilt)
- Destroyed: 1991

The Ashkenazi Synagogue of Tbilisi (also called the Little Synagogue or the Beit Rachel Synagogue) is a Chabad Orthodox Jewish congregation and synagogue located at 13 TKavi I Dead End, Tbilisi, Georgia.

== History ==
The synagogue was built in the early 1900s or 1910s for the city's Ashkenazi Jewish population. Attendance rates declined after the establishment of Bolshevik rule in Georgia and the suppression of religion that accompanied it. The building was destroyed during the 1991 Racha earthquake; and was rebuilt in 2009 by the Euro-Asian Jewish Congress headed by Alexander Mashkevitch.

In September 2008 the Georgian cabinet gave the Jewish community custody of the building for 25 years. The Euro-Asian Jewish Congress supported its repair and reconstruction, and the restored synagogue was opened at a ceremony on 14 and 15 September 2009. It was named Beit Rachel in memory of the mother of the congress's president, Alexander Mashkevich, the project's chief sponsor. On the eve of the ceremony the congress's leaders met Ilia II, Catholicos-Patriarch of Georgia.

President Mikheil Saakashvili took part in the opening, calling the synagogue a symbol of the Jewish presence in Georgia's history, and he also praised Georgians in the Racha region for caring for their local synagogue long after the Jews had left. The restoration took two years, and guests from around the world attended the ceremony. The Historic Synagogues of Europe database gives the original construction date as either 1864 or 1914.

The synagogue stands in a courtyard of traditional houses in the Old Town and is marked from the street by a sign in Hebrew. According to a Jewish travel guide, the original building had a single floor, and the reconstruction excavated the ground to create a lower prayer hall.

== Synagogue ==
The Ashkenazi Synagogue has two mikvehs, one for men and one for women. The building is a 2-story trapezoidal structure. They have separate entrances for men and women. The Torah ark, located in the lower hall, is around 150 years old and has seven Sephardic and two Ashkenazi Torah scrolls.

== See also ==
- Great Synagogue (Tbilisi)
- History of the Jews in Georgia
