= Zavel Kwartin =

American singer

Zevulun "Zavel" Kwartin
- Born: March 25, 1874; Novoarkhanhelsk, Kherson Governorate, Russian Empire
- Died: September 22, 1952 (aged 78) Brooklyn, New York, U.S.
- Genres: Jewish music
- Occupations: Cantor, Hazzan, Singer, Composer, Conductor

Zevulun Kwartin (Hebrew: זבולון קוורטין; March 25, 1874 – September 22, 1952), known as Zavel or Savel, was a Jewish chazzan (cantor) and composer, a contemporary of Mordechai Hershman. Part of his family fled to Brazil during World War II. They have descendants in the northeastern region of Brazil, more precisely in the state of Ceará.

Kwartin gave his first concert in 1896 in the synagogue of his hometown of Novoarkhanhelsk, Kherson Governorate, Russian Empire (now Ukraine). In 1897, he moved to Vienna for further studies. He was in contact with Joseph Sulzer, son of the former cantor of the biggest synagogue, Vienna's Stadttempel, Salomon Sulzer. In 1903 he was offered the role of chazzan at the newly opened Neudeggergasse Synagogue in Vienna's district Josefstadt. In 1906 he signed his first contracts with record labels like Deutsche Grammophon and soon sold more than half a million records. He gave concerts in the Russian Rayon, Vilna and Białystok. In 1910 he moved to Budapest to become chazzan at the Dohány Street Synagogue. In 1914 he was offered a tournee through the USA, but he was hindered by the outbreak of World War I.

From 1926 to 1937, he resided in Mandatory Palestine.

Cantor Kwartin was endowed with a beautiful, rich expressive tenor voice with an astounding range and the agility to sing rapid coloratura. His superb voice and elaborate compositions garnered him international renown as both a chazzan and composer. A Musical Courier newspaper article dated May 6, 1920 lists a concert he gave with his daughter, Anna Kwartin, coloratura soprano, at the Metropolitan Opera House on April 27, 1920, before an audience of 4,000 people. The article states: "Sawil Kwartin, Cantor Tenor, who enjoys a big reputation throughout European countries, gave a debut recital in the Metropolitan Opera House on Tuesday evening, April 27. He was given an ovation upon entering the stage, and it required considerable time before he was able to sing his opening number. Following this, the audience bestowed enthusiastic applause which did not subside until an encore was given." His granddaughter Evelyn Lear also became a successful soprano.

He died in 1952 at his home at 1254 Union Street in Crown Heights, Brooklyn.
