= Jewish cemetery of Ponta Delgada =

Cemetery in the Azores

Jewish Cemetery of Ponta Delgada
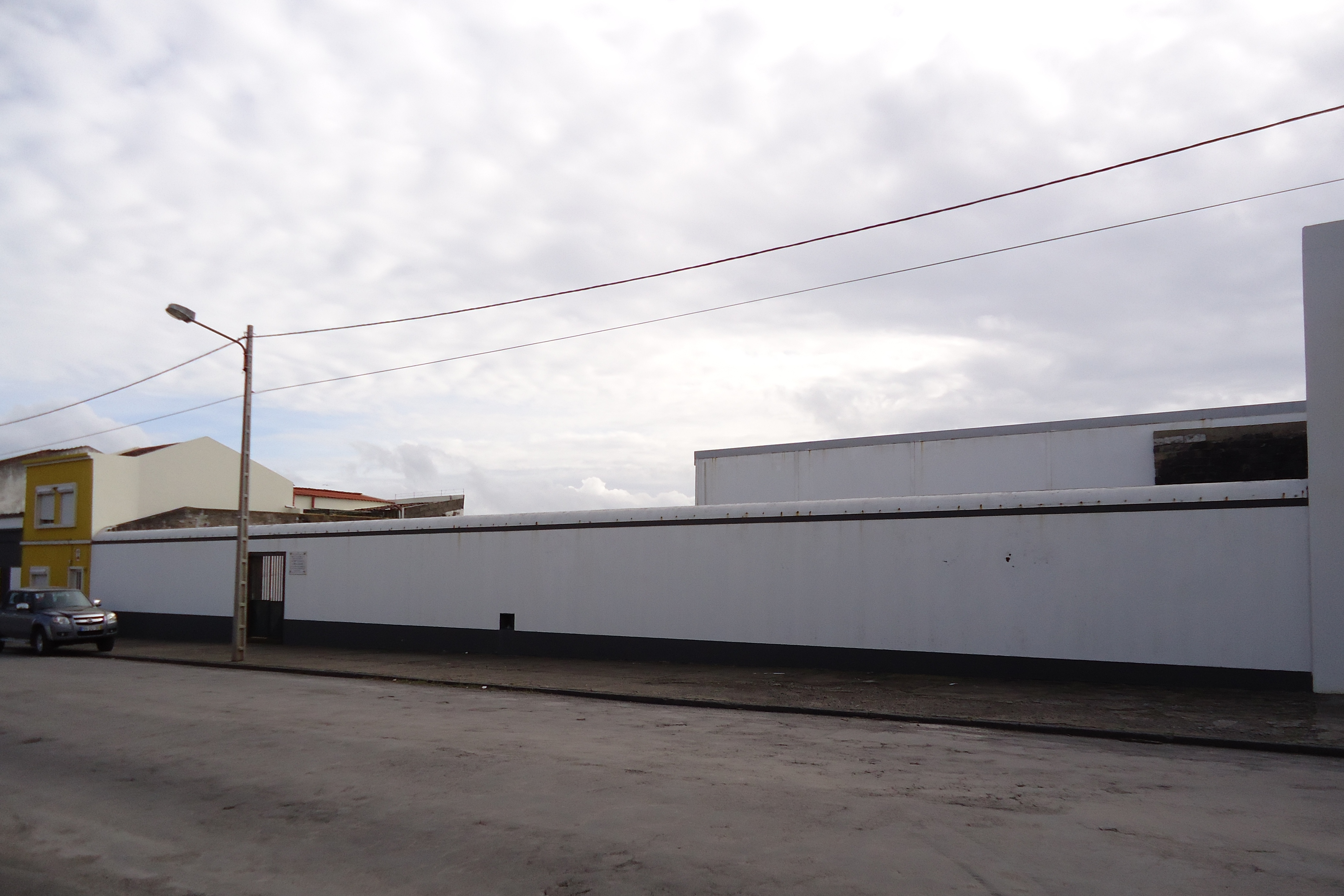
- Entrance to the Jewish Cemetery.
- Interactive map of Jewish Cemetery of Ponta Delgada

Details
- Established: 1834
- Location: Ponta Delgada
- Country: Azores, Portugal
- Coordinates: 37°44′01.9″N 25°41′16.2″W
- Type: Jewish cemetery

The Jewish Cemetery of Ponta Delgada is a Jewish cemetery located in Ponta Delgada, Azores.

Here is buried Mimom ben Abraham Abohbot, founder of the Synagogue Ets Haim in Angra do Heroísmo.

== See also ==
- Jewish Cemetery of Funchal
- History of the Jews in the Azores
