= History of the Jews in the Azores =

Azorean Jews
Regions with significant populations
- São Miguel Island

Languages
- Portuguese, Hebrew

Religion
- Judaism

The history of the Jews in the Azores dates back to the original Portuguese settlement of the Azores in the 15th century. The Jewish community is small, but maintains a synagogue and a cemetery.

== History ==
Several important Portuguese-Jewish families settled in the Azores in the 15th century, shortly after the islands were discovered by the Portuguese. Portuguese Jews fled from mainland Portugal to the Azores to escape the Portuguese Inquisition.

In 1818, a number of Moroccan Sephardi Jewish families settled in the Azores. Moroccan Jews became active in local Azorean business, trade, and commerce. These early Moroccan Jewish migrants founded the Sahar Hassamain Synagogue ("Gates of Heaven"), the oldest synagogue in Portugal since the Inquisition.

Many Azorean Catholics believe they have Jewish ancestry due to assimilation, intermarriage, and conversion.

The name of the freguesia of Porto Judeu means "Jewish Port" in Portuguese. Local residents tell different stories as to the origin of the name: one story claims that in the 16th century a boat containing Jewish refugees was caught in a storm and the refugees were forced to settle in Porto Judeu rather than the capital of the Azores, while a different story claims that the first Portuguese settlers were afraid and told a Jewish passenger to jump first.

After following into disuse for many decades, the Sahar Hassamain Synagogue held its first services in nearly 50 years on Erev Shabbat, April 24, 2015. The day before services, 300 people watched the re-dedication of the synagogue.

== See also ==
- Jewish cemetery of Ponta Delgada
- Sahar Hassamain Synagogue
