= Neudeggergasse Synagogue =

Former synagogue in Vienna, Austria

- German: Synagoge Neudeggergasse
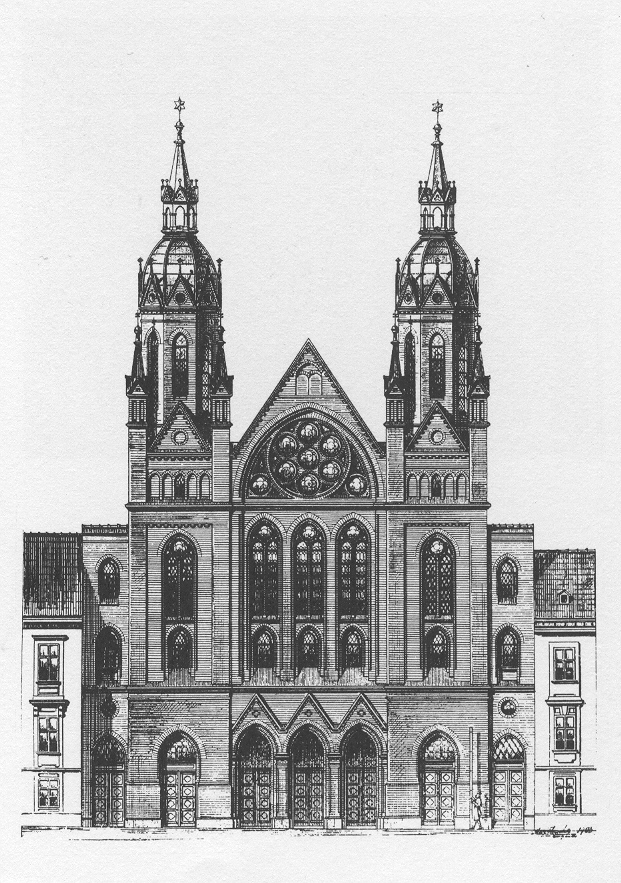
- Front view of the former synagogue in c. 1903

- Location of the former synagogue in Austria

Religion
- Affiliation: Judaism (former)
- Ecclesiastical or organizational status: Synagogue (–1938)
- Status: Destroyed

Location
- Location: Neudeggergasse 10–12, Josefstadt, Vienna
- Country: Austria
- Interactive map of Neudeggergasse Synagogue
- Coordinates: 48°12′26″N 16°21′07″E

Architecture
- Architect: Max Fleischer
- Type: Synagogue architecture
- Style: Gothic Revival
- Funded by: Baron Moritz von Königswarter
- Established: 1903 (as a congregation)
- Completed: 1903
- Destroyed: 9–10 November 1938 on Kristallnacht

Specifications
- Spire: Two
- Materials: Brick

Neudeggergasse Synagogue (German: Synagoge Neudeggergasse) was a Jewish synagogue, located at Neudeggergasse 10–12, Josefstadt, in the 8th district of Vienna, Austria. The synagogue served the Jewish community of Neubau and Josefstadt, the 7th and 8th districts of Vienna.

== History ==
Commissioned by Baron Moritz Freiherr von Königswarter who established the congregation in 1903, and designed by Max Fleischer in the North-German Gothic Revival style, the synagogue was completed in the same year. Constructed mostly of brick, including the façade and the two towers, the main hall of the synagogue was divided by pillars into three naves; allowing more than 300 worshipers to be seated on the ground level. The women sat separate from the men and could watch the proceedings from the balcony on the second floor. The synagogue had excellent acoustics.

The synagogue was destroyed during the Kristallnacht pogroms in 1938, after the Anschluß of Austria to Nazi Germany.

In 1998, during the construction of new buildings for housing, parts of the previous façade were rebuilt in vinyl. The owner of the house at Neudeggergasse 10 did not want a complete reconstruction. A memorial plaque was erected on the site of the former synagogue in 2019.

== See also ==
- History of the Jews in Vienna
- Great Synagogue (Plzeň)
