= Selm-Bork Synagogue =

Liberal Jewish synagogue in Westphalia, Germany

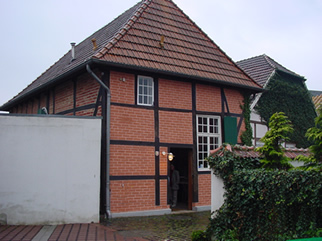
- The Selm-Bork synagogue, now used by a Liberal congregation

- Location of the synagogue in North Rhine-Westphalia

Religion
- Affiliation: Reform Judaism
- Rite: Nusach Ashkenaz (c. 1818–1938)
- Ecclesiastical or organizational status: Synagogue (c. 1818–1938); Barn (c. 1938–1991); Synagogue (since 1994)
- Status: Active

Location
- Location: Hauptstraße 10, Westphalia, Unna, North Rhine-Westphalia
- Country: Germany
- Interactive map of Selm-Bork Synagogue
- Coordinates: 51°39′55″N 7°28′02″E

Architecture
- Completed: c. 1818
- Materials: Timber (partial)

The Selm-Bork Synagogue is a Liberal Jewish congregation and synagogue, located at Hauptstraße 10, in Westphalia, in the Unna district, in the state of North Rhine-Westphalia, Germany. The synagogue is one of two remaining rural synagogues in the region and a witness of pre-Holocaust Jewish life in Westphalia.

Historically, the congregation worshiped in the Ashkenazi rite. Since 2000, the congregation has embraced Liberal Judaism.

== History ==
The exact year of construction is unknown, the first written reference was found in a directory of houses, written in 1818. Until Kristallnacht of 1938, the synagogue was used for prayer. During the pogrom the building was looted and partially destroyed. The Jewish community was forced to sell the building. A coal dealer acquired the building and used it as a barn.

In 1991 the synagogue was restored and opened for the public in 1994, the government declared the synagogue a historic monument. since 1994 it has served as the place of worship for Etz Ami, a liberal Jewish community.

== See also ==
- History of the Jews in Germany
- List of synagogues in Germany (in German)
