= Aley Synagogue =

Synagogue in Aley, Lebanon

- Location of the synagogue in Lebanon

Religion
- Affiliation: Judaism
- Rite: Mizrahi
- Ecclesiastical or organisational status: Synagogue
- Governing body: Lebanese Jewish Community Council
- Leadership: Isaac Arazi
- Status: Active

Location
- Location: Aley, Aley District
- Country: Lebanon
- Coordinates: 33°48′27″N 35°35′56″E

Architecture
- Completed: 1895

The Aley Synagogue also known as the Ohel Jacob Synagogue, is a Jewish congregation and synagogue, located in Aley, in the Aley district of Lebanon. The synagogue was completed in 1895.

== See also ==
- History of the Jews in Lebanon
- List of synagogues in Lebanon
