= Sinagoga Shaare Sedek =

Orthodox synagogue in Barranquilla, Colombia

Shaare Sedek Synagogue
- Hebrew: בית הכנסת שערי צדק; Spanish: Sinagoga Shaare Sedek
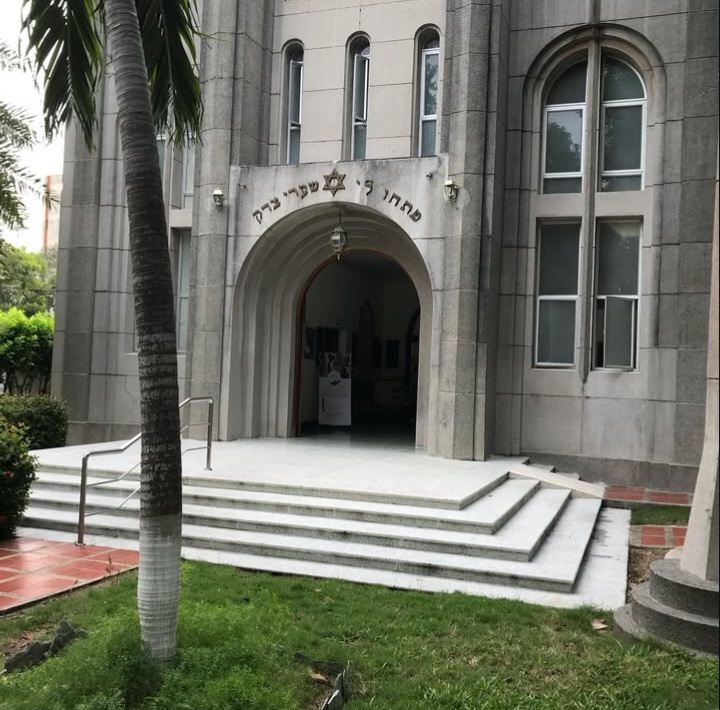

- Location of the synagogue in Colombia

Religion
- Affiliation: Orthodox Judaism
- Rite: Nusach Sefard
- Ecclesiastical or organizational status: Synagogue
- Status: Active

Location
- Location: Calle 55- 74-71, Barranquilla
- Country: Colombia
- Interactive map of Shaare Sedek Synagogue
- Coordinates: 11°00′04″N 74°48′08″W

The Shaare Sedek Synagogue (Hebrew: שערי צדק; Spanish: Sinagoga Shaare Sedek) is an Orthodox Jewish congregation and synagogue, located in Barranquilla, Colombia. It was established by Sephardic Jewish immigrants in the beginning of the 20th century.

== See also ==
- History of the Jews in Colombia
- List of synagogues in Colombia
