= Hietzinger Synagogue =

Former synagogue in Vienna, Austria

- German: Hietzinger Synagoge
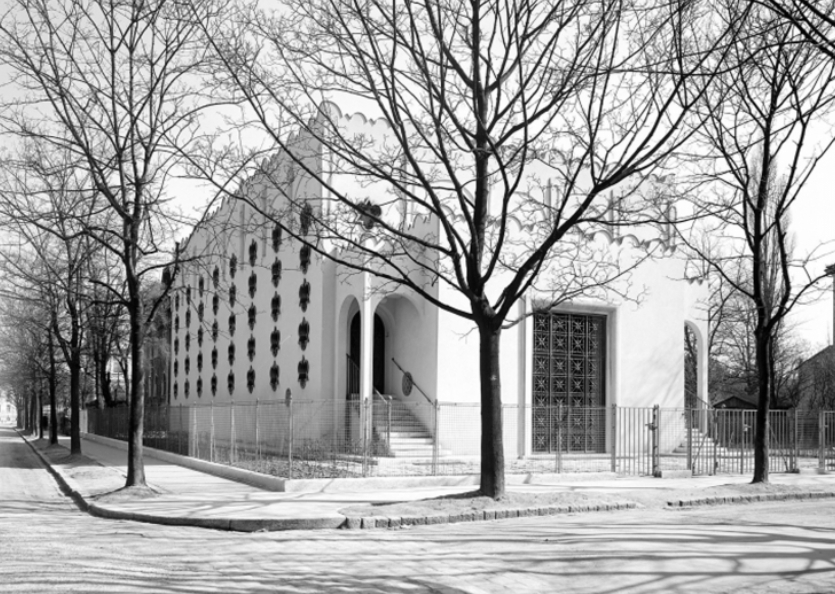
- The synagogue in 1930, prior to its destruction

- Location of the former synagogue in Austria

Religion
- Affiliation: Judaism (former)
- Ecclesiastical or organizational status: Synagogue (c. 1928–1938)
- Status: Destroyed

Location
- Location: Eitelbergergasse 22, Hietzing, Vienna
- Country: Austria
- Interactive map of Hietzinger Synagogue
- Coordinates: 48°11′10″N 16°17′31″E

Architecture
- Architects: Arthur Grünberger; Adolf Jelletz
- Type: Synagogue architecture
- Style: Expressionist architecture
- Established: 1904 (as a congregation)
- Completed: 1931
- Destroyed: 9–10 November 1938 on Kristallnacht

The Hietzinger Synagogue (German: Hietzinger Synagoge), or New World Synagogue, was a Jewish congregation and synagogue, that was located at Eitelbergergasse 22, in Hietzing, in the 13th district of Vienna, Austria. The Hietzing Synagogue was the only free-standing synagogue built in Vienna between World War I and World War II; subsequently destroyed as a result of Kristallnacht.

== History ==
The congregation was established in 1904 and worshiped from premises located at Penzinger Straße 132. The building was too small for the growing congregation and, after several attempts, an international competition was held to design a new synagogue. The winners, Arthur Grünberger and Adolf Jelletz, designed the rectangular building in the Expressionist style, constructed between 1926 and 1928; and completed in 1931.

The synagogue was desecrated and partially destroyed during Kristallnacht in November 1938 and demolished the following year.

== See also ==
- History of the Jews in Vienna
