= Währinger Tempel =

Former synagogue in Vienna, Austria

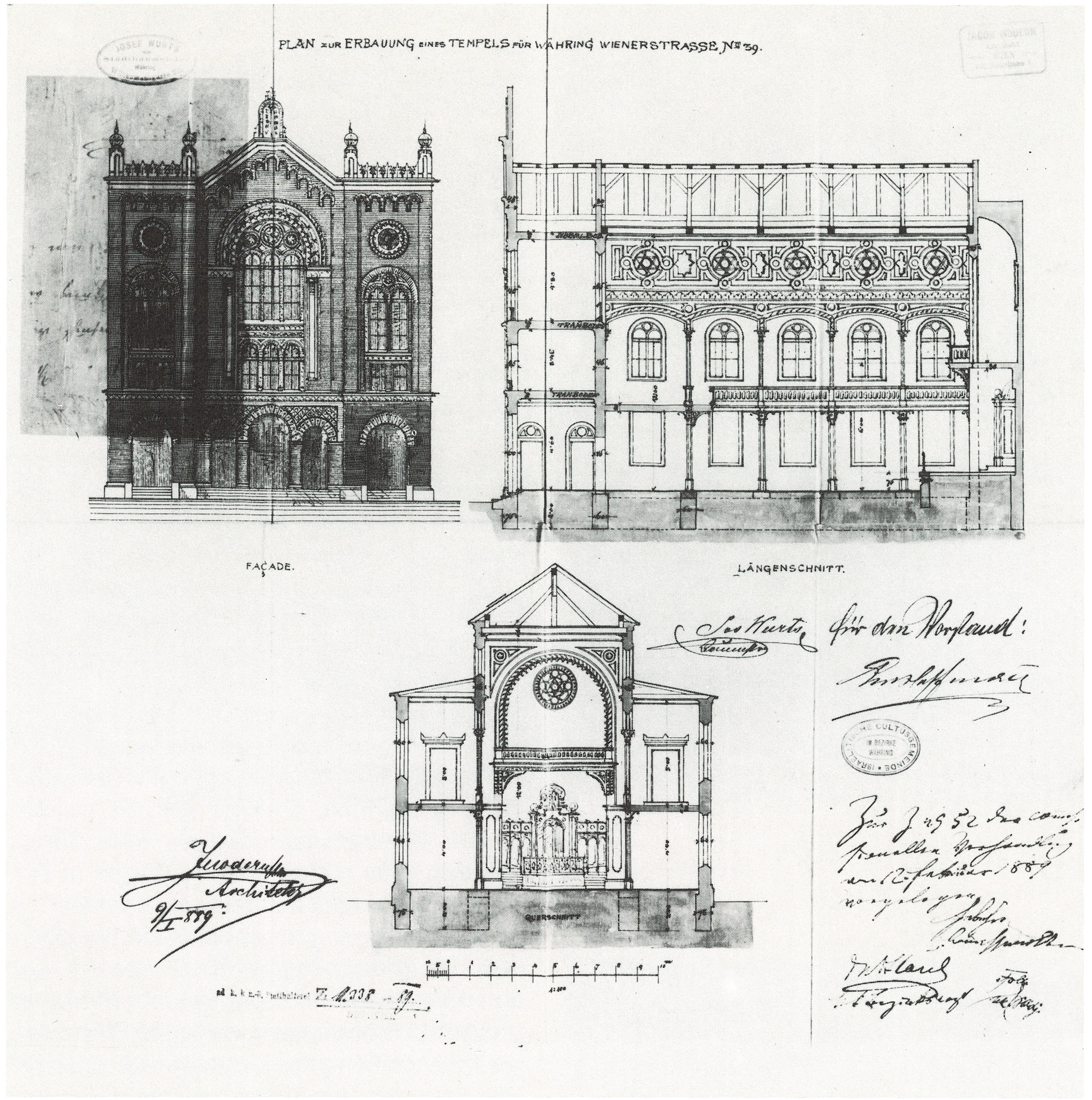
- Drawings of the Währinger Tempel by Jakob Modern

- Location of the former synagogue in Austria

Religion
- Affiliation: Judaism (former)
- Ecclesiastical or organizational status: Synagogue (1888–1938)
- Status: Destroyed

Location
- Location: Schopenhauerstraße 39, Währing, Vienna
- Country: Austria
- Interactive map of Währinger Tempel

Architecture
- Architect: Jakob Modern
- Type: Synagogue architecture
- Completed: 1888
- Destroyed: 9–10 November 1938 on Kristallnacht
- Capacity: 328 men; 176 women

The Währinger Tempel was a Jewish synagogue, located at Schopenhauerstraße 39, in Währing, the 18th district of Vienna, Austria. Designed by Jakob Modern and completed in 1888, the synagogue was destroyed during the Kristallnacht in 1938.

== See also ==
- History of the Jews in Vienna
