= List of synagogues in Mexico =

A list of synagogues in Mexico:

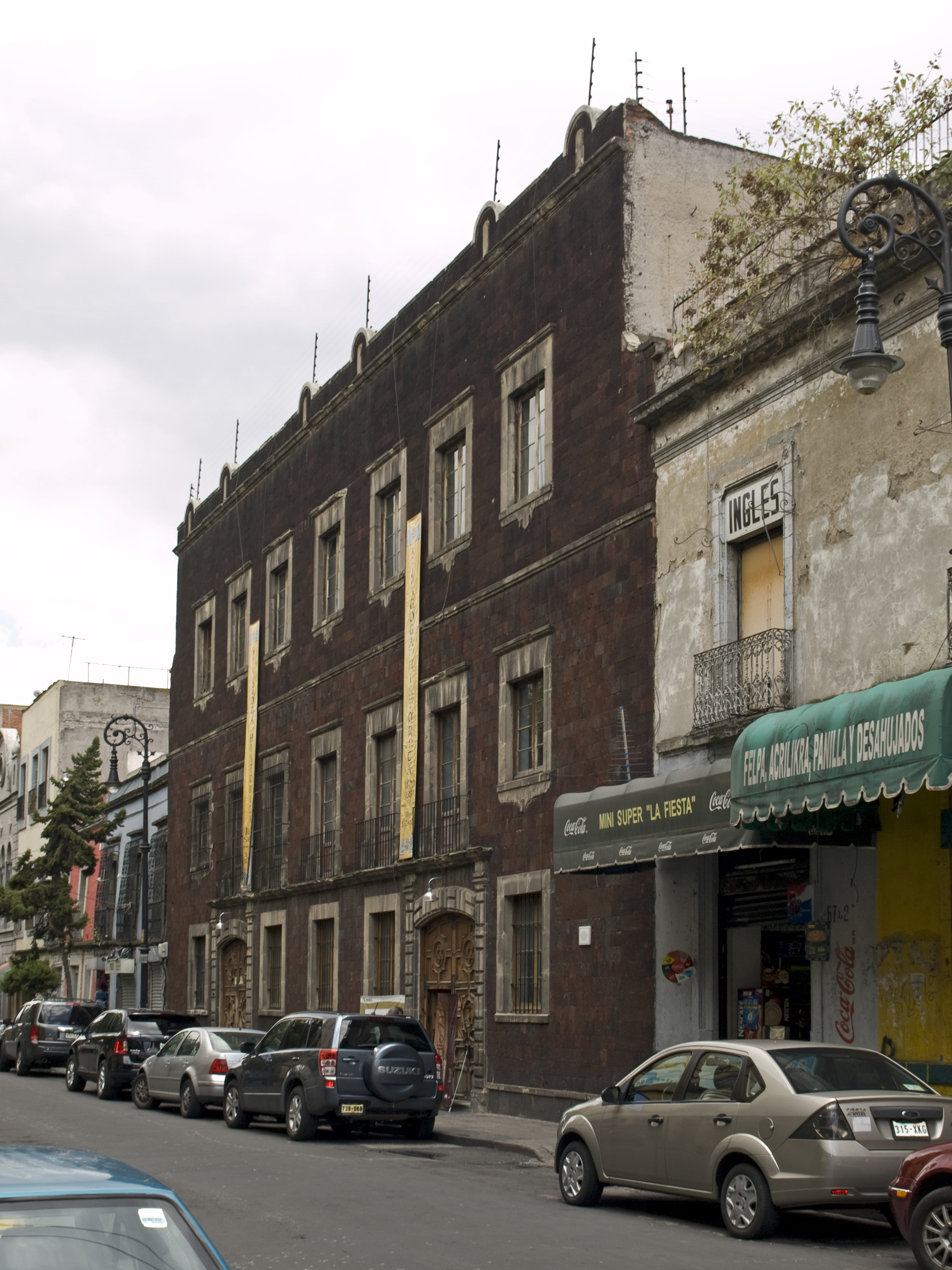
The historical synagogue at Justo Sierra 71 (Templo Nidjei Israel), Mexico City

- Nidjei Israel, a historical synagogue in Mexico City
- Yehuda Halevi Synagogue
- El Neguev Synagogue, also the Jewish Community of Venta Prieta, in Hidalgo
- Lake Chapala Jewish Congregation https://www.lakechapalajewishcongregation.com/
- Agudas Ajim
- Adat Israel
- Monte Sinaí
- Rodfei Tzedek
- Beth Moshe
- Shar le Simja
- Beth Yosef
- Hoel Yitzjak
- Beth Yitzjak
- Or Joseph
- Habitat
- Maguén David
- Aram Zoba
- Maor Abraham
- Maor Hatora
- Keter Tora
- Birkat Shmuel
- Ramat Shalom
- Shaarei Tzion
- Bet El
- Beth Israel Community Center
- Shul Yavne
- Comunidad Hebrea de Guadalajara
- Comunidad Israelita de Guadalajara
- Comunidad Judia de Cancun
- Jewish Cultural & Community Center San Miguel de Allende
- Chabad of San Miguel de Allende
- Chabad of Cozumel Mexico
- Chabad of CDMX
- Chabad of Playa del Carmen
- Chabad of Isla Mujeres
- Chabad of Guadalajara
- Chabad of Cancun
- Chabad of Tijuana
- Chabad of Los Cabos
