= Chevet Achim Synagogue =

Former synagogue in Havana, Cuba

- Spanish: Templo Union Hebrea Chevet Achim
- Location of the former synagogue in Cuba

Religion
- Affiliation: Judaism (former)
- Rite: Sephardi
- Ecclesiastical or organizational status: Synagogue (1914– )
- Status: Abandoned

Location
- Location: Calle Inquisidor, Old Havana, Havana
- Country: Cuba
- Interactive map of Chevet Achim Synagogue
- Coordinates: 23°08′03″N 82°20′55″W

The Chevet Achim Synagogue (Spanish: Templo Union Hebrea Chevet Achim) is a former Jewish congregation and synagogue, located on Calle Inquisidor, in the Old Town of Havana, Cuba. Established in 1914, it is the oldest synagogue in Cuba.

== See also ==
- History of the Jews in Cuba
- List of synagogues in Cuba
