= Sahar Hassamain Synagogue =

Former synagogue in Azores, Portugal

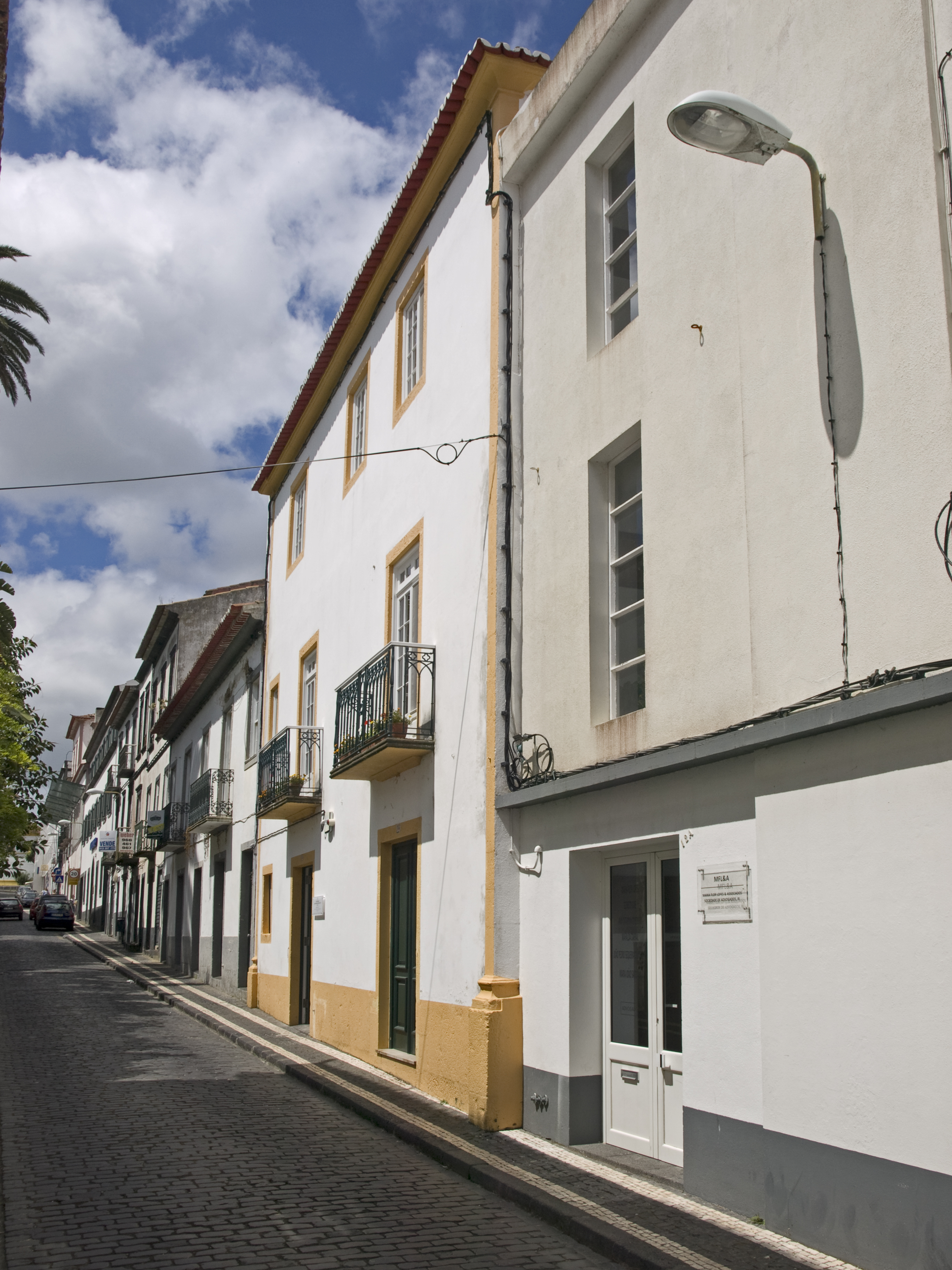
- Street view of the former synagogue, now museum, in 2018

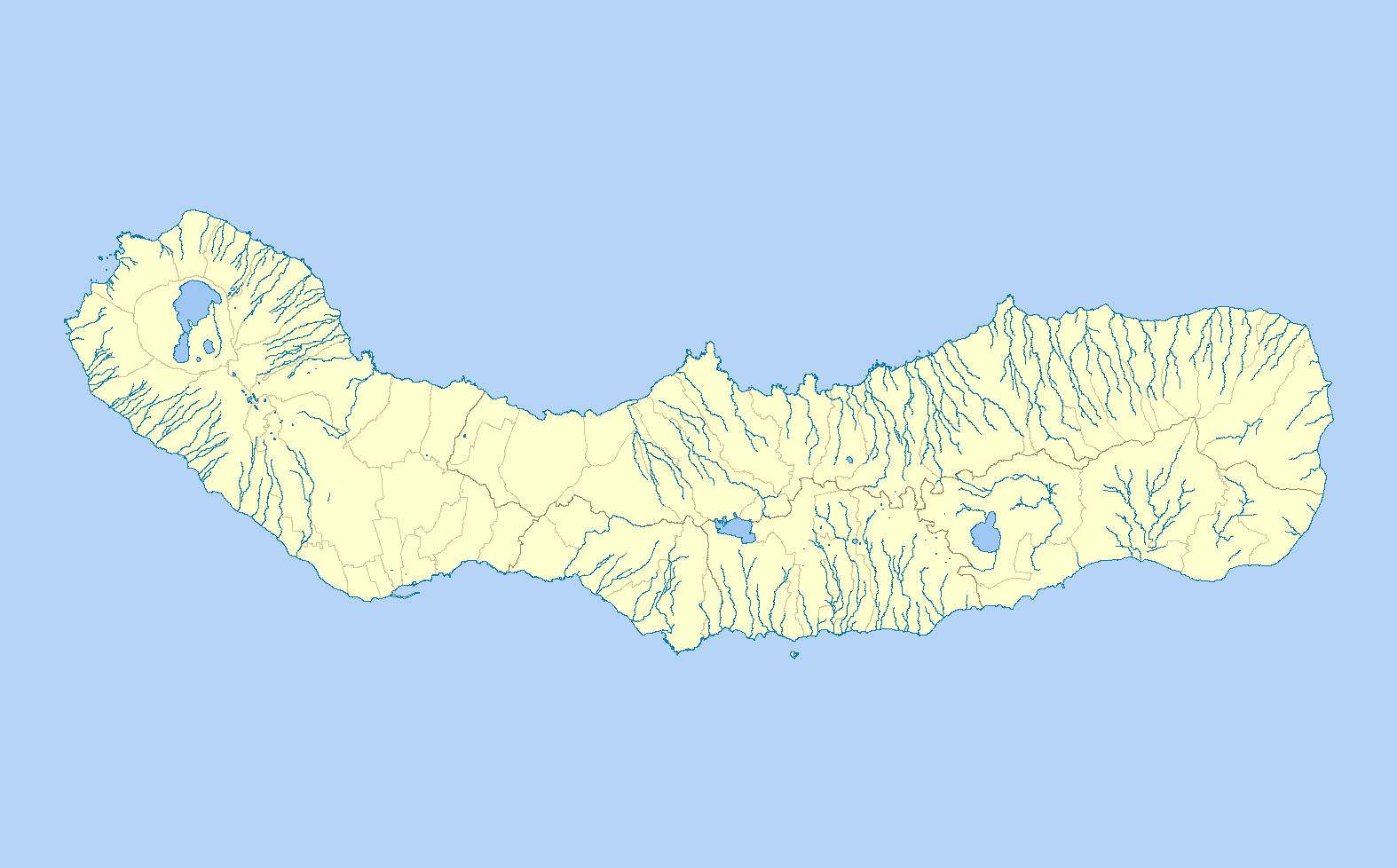
- Location of the former synagogue on São Miguel Island

Religion
- Affiliation: Judaism (former)
- Rite: Nusach Sefaradi
- Ecclesiastical or organisational status: Synagogue (1836– ); Jewish museum (since 2015)
- Status: Inactive (as a synagogue); Repurposed

Location
- Location: 16 Rua de Brum, Ponta Delgada, São Miguel Island, Azores
- Country: Portugal
- Coordinates: 37°44′21.3″N 25°40′11.0″W

Architecture
- Type: Synagogue architecture
- Founder: Abraham Bensaúde
- Completed: 1836

The Sahar Hassamain Synagogue ("Gate of the Heavens") is a former Jewish congregation and synagogue, located at 16 Rua de Brum, Ponta Delgada, on São Miguel Island, in the Azores region of Portugal. The former synagogue was completed in 1836 and is the oldest synagogue in Portugal, built after the expulsion of Jews from the Iberian Peninsula.

In 2015, following restoration, the former synagogue was repurposed as a Jewish museum called the Sahar Hassamaim Hebrew Museum.

== History ==
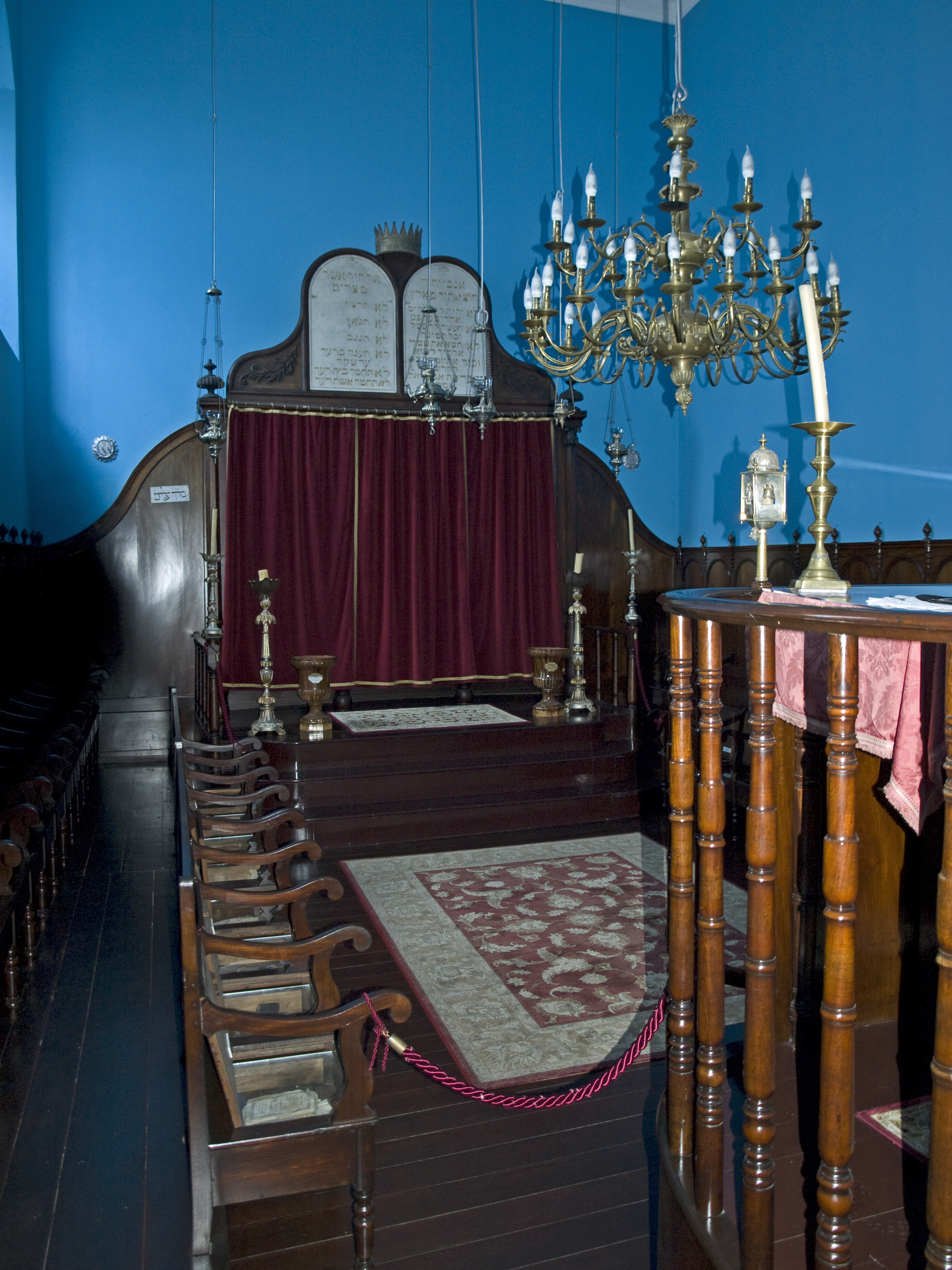
Tebah

The Shaar Hashamayim Synagogue is one of only a few remnants of Jewish culture in the Azores and in all of Portugal. Founded by Abraham Bensaúde along with other members of the Jewish community of the city in 1836, in a building purchased for this effect. It is the oldest synagogue in Portugal built after the expulsion of the Jews from the country. There were formerly five synagogues in Ponta Delgada, and Shaar Hashamayim is the only one still existing.

The first references to the establishment of Jewish families in the Azores is from the first half of the nineteenth century. Jews came to the Azores from Morocco because of the economic restrictions that were being imposed on them there at the time. In the same period, the influence of the Catholic Church had declined in Portugal, and the advent of liberalism, particularly after the Liberal Revolution of Porto (1820), attracted Jews to the Azores. Jews were accepted at the time, in contrast to the persecution by the Inquisition in previous centuries. It is likely that those Jews that arrived had Portuguese ancestry. Family names from this period are Amiel, Abohbot, Benarus, Levy, Zagory and Besabat.

== Today ==
Sahar Hassmain synagogue was closed for more than fifty years. As of March 2009 it was temporarily open on Saturdays for guided tours in the context of the celebrations of 420 years of the arrival of the first Jews to the Azores. Services are no longer conducted. The municipality undertook recently to support the recovery process of the synagogue although the property is owned by the Jewish Community of Lisbon.

The synagogue is located on an upper floor of a building that also included the rabbi’s residence. The exterior of the building is not recognizable, since it was built with the façade of a typical Azorean dwelling house. The interior retains its original character and on display are some objects of worship, especially a chair of circumcision from 1819, chandeliers and diverse historical documentation in Hebrew. The archipelago came to have other synagogues on the islands of Terceira and Faial. Besides this synagogue, there remains only the Jewish cemetery of Santa Clara also in Ponta Delgada, from 1834, and the Cemetery in Angra do Heroismo from 1832.

In 2010, historical religious objects, manuscripts and printed documents were found which constituted a valuable collection of the history of the community. The site of the former synagogue was leased to the Municipality of Ponta Delgada by the Jewish Community of Lisbon, for a term of 99 years. With philanthropic support the Municipality completed the restoration of the property in April 2015, and reclassified the building as a Jewish museum and for use for cultural and tourism activities.

== See also ==
- Great Synagogue (Gibraltar)
- History of the Jews in the Azores
- History of the Jews in Portugal
- List of synagogues in Portugal
