= Beit Rachel Synagogue, Astana =

Synagogue in Astana, Kazakhstan

Beit Rachel Synagogue

- Location within Kazakhstan

Religion
- Affiliation: Judaism

Location
- Municipality: Astana
- Country: Kazakhstan
- Interactive map of Beit Rachel Synagogue
- Coordinates: 51.1573088°N 71.4616569°E

Architecture
- Established: September 7, 2004

Beit Rachel Synagogue is a synagogue in Astana, Kazakhstan. Opened on September 7, 2004, it is the largest synagogue in Central Asia.

Its opening ceremony was attended by President of Kazakhstan Nursultan Nazarbayev and Chief Ashkenazi Rabbi of Israel Yona Metzger. Its construction was funded by Kazakh-Israeli billionaire Alexander Mashkevitch. The synagogue is named after Rachel Joffe, mother of Alexander Mashkevich, leader of Kazakh Jewry and president of the EAJC. The Jakarta Post describes the synagogue, a rare example of its kind a Muslim-majority country, as "a symbol of how a Muslim country can build and sustain a peaceful relationship between Islam and Judaism."

== Architectural design ==
The Beit Rachel Synagogue is 25 metres (82 ft) tall and approximately 5,600 square metres in area. The top of the roof is decorated with the star of David, which is a symbol of faith and community. Inside there are separate prayer halls for men and women. There are rooms for overnight accommodation during the holy day of Shabbat.

== See also ==
- History of the Jews in Kazakhstan
- List of synagogues
