= Great Synagogue (Tbilisi) =

Synagogue in Tbilisi in the republic of Georgia

- Georgian: დიდი სინაგოგა
- Exterior of the synagogue in 2020

- Location of the synagogue in Georgia

Religion
- Affiliation: Judaism
- Rite: Nusach Ashkenaz; Georgian Jewish
- Ecclesiastical or organizational status: Synagogue
- Status: Active

Location
- Location: 45-47 Kote Afkhazi (former Leselidze) Street, Tbilisi
- Country: Georgia
- Interactive map of Great Synagogue
- Coordinates: 41°41′24″N 44°48′26″E

Architecture
- Type: Synagogue architecture
- Style: Moorish Revival; Romanesque Revival
- Completed: 1911

Specifications
- Length: 24.5 metres (80 ft)
- Width: 15 metres (49 ft)
- Height (max): 14 metres (46 ft)
- Materials: Brick

The Great Synagogue (Georgian: დიდი სინაგოგა), also known as the Georgian Synagogue, is a synagogue, located at 45-47 Kote Afkhazi Street (formerly Leselidze Street) in Tbilisi, the capital of Georgia. Built between 1904 and 1911, it is the largest synagogue in the country and serves as the central house of worship for the city’s Jewish community.

== History ==
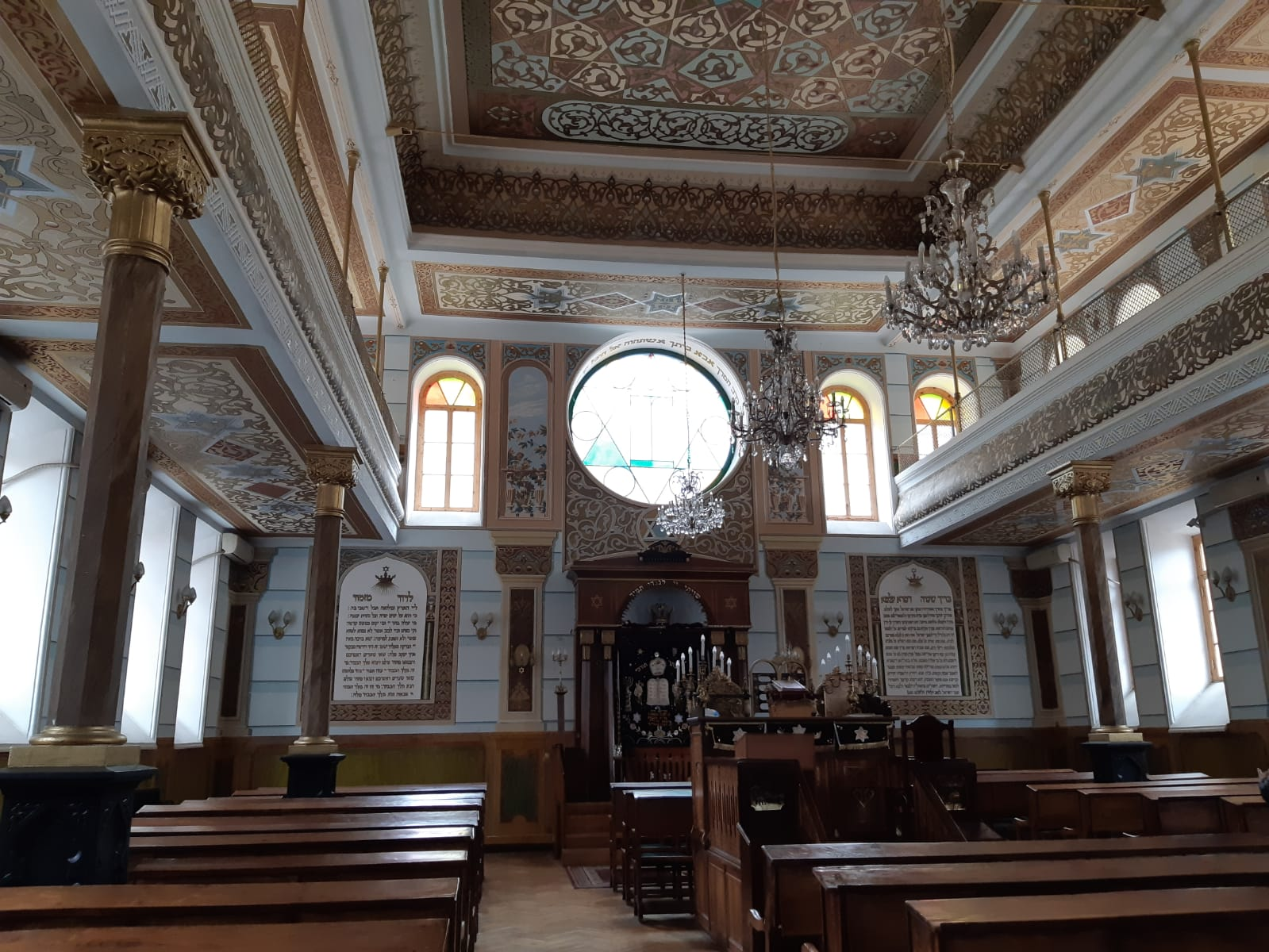
The Upper Prayer Hall (first floor). It is the main space, significantly larger, majestic, and lavishly decorated with frescoes and geometric paintings. It is reserved for Shabbat, major holidays, and weddings. It also features the traditional separate women's gallery

In the late 19th century, Georgian Jews from Akhaltsikhe settled in the Kvemo Kala quarter of Tbilisi. In 1877, they converted a private house into a synagogue, which became known locally as the “synagogue of the people of Akhaltsikhe.” By 1899 the building had fallen into disrepair and was demolished by government order.

Construction of a new synagogue began in 1904 and was completed in 1911. The red-brick, two-storey structure combines Neo-Moorish and Neo-Romanesque elements, and the premises include a ritual bath (mikveh). The building underwent restoration in 2011–2012.

Other synagogues in Tbilisi include the Ashkenazi Synagogue (Beit Rachel), which remains active; the former Ashkenazi Old (First, Soldiers') Synagogue at 10 Anton Katalikosi (Gia Abesadze) Street, completed in 1918 in the Romanesque Revival style and later converted into a theatre; and the domed former Ashkenazi New (Second) Synagogue at 3 Anton Katalikosi Street, completed in 1915 and now repurposed as a Jewish museum, the David Baazov Museum of History of Jews of Georgia.

== Gallery ==
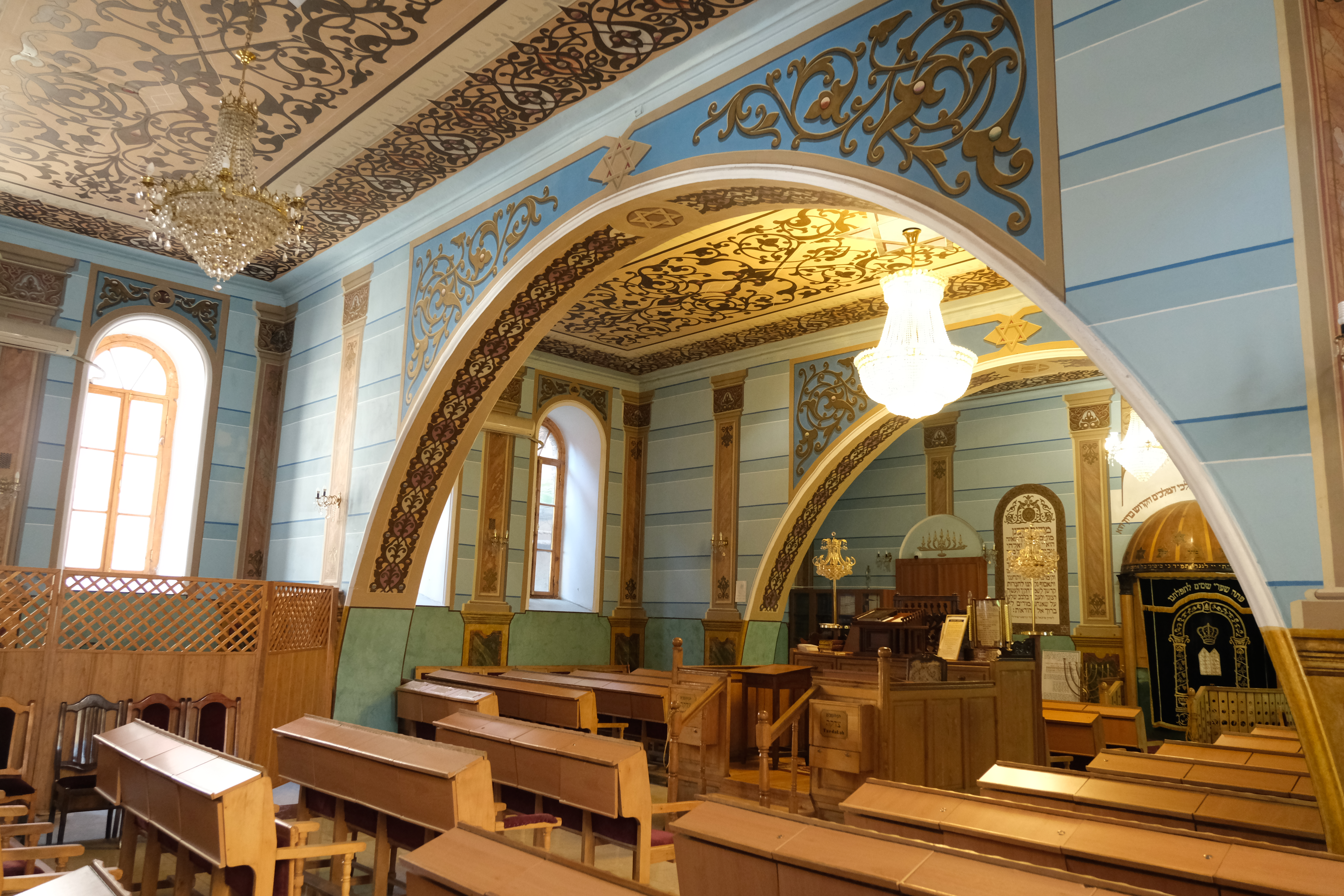
Interior of the synagogue’s ground floor prayer hall

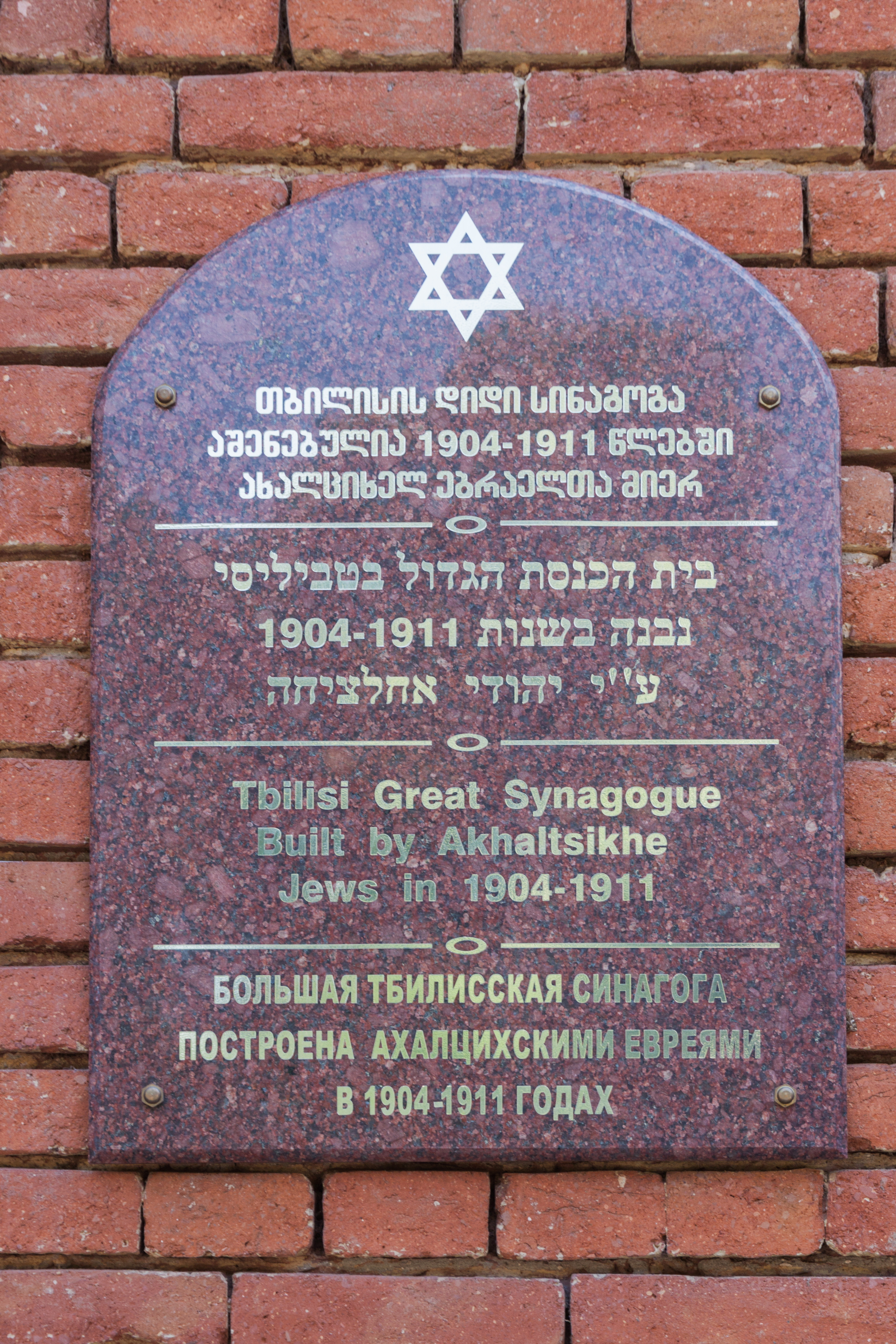

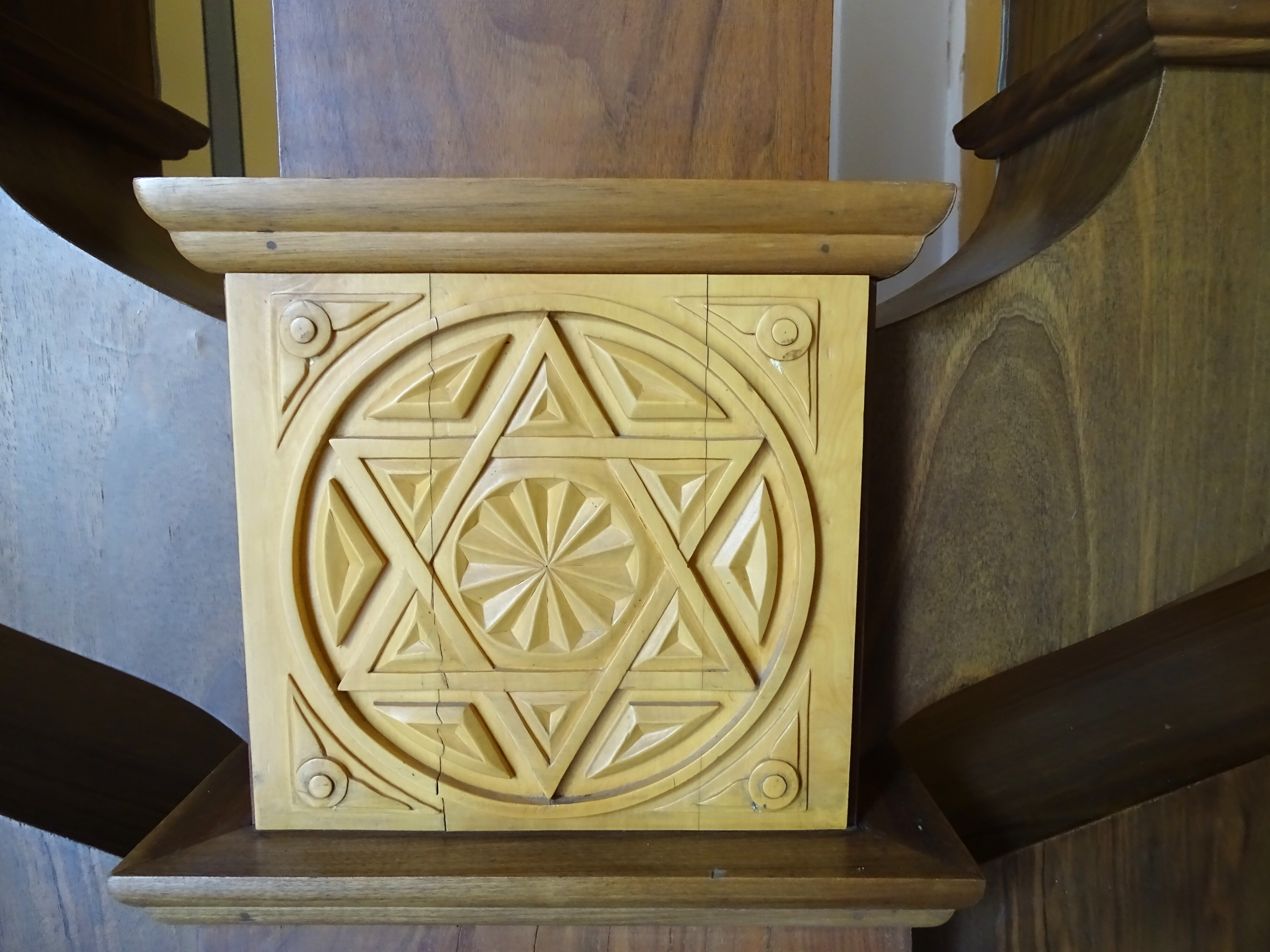

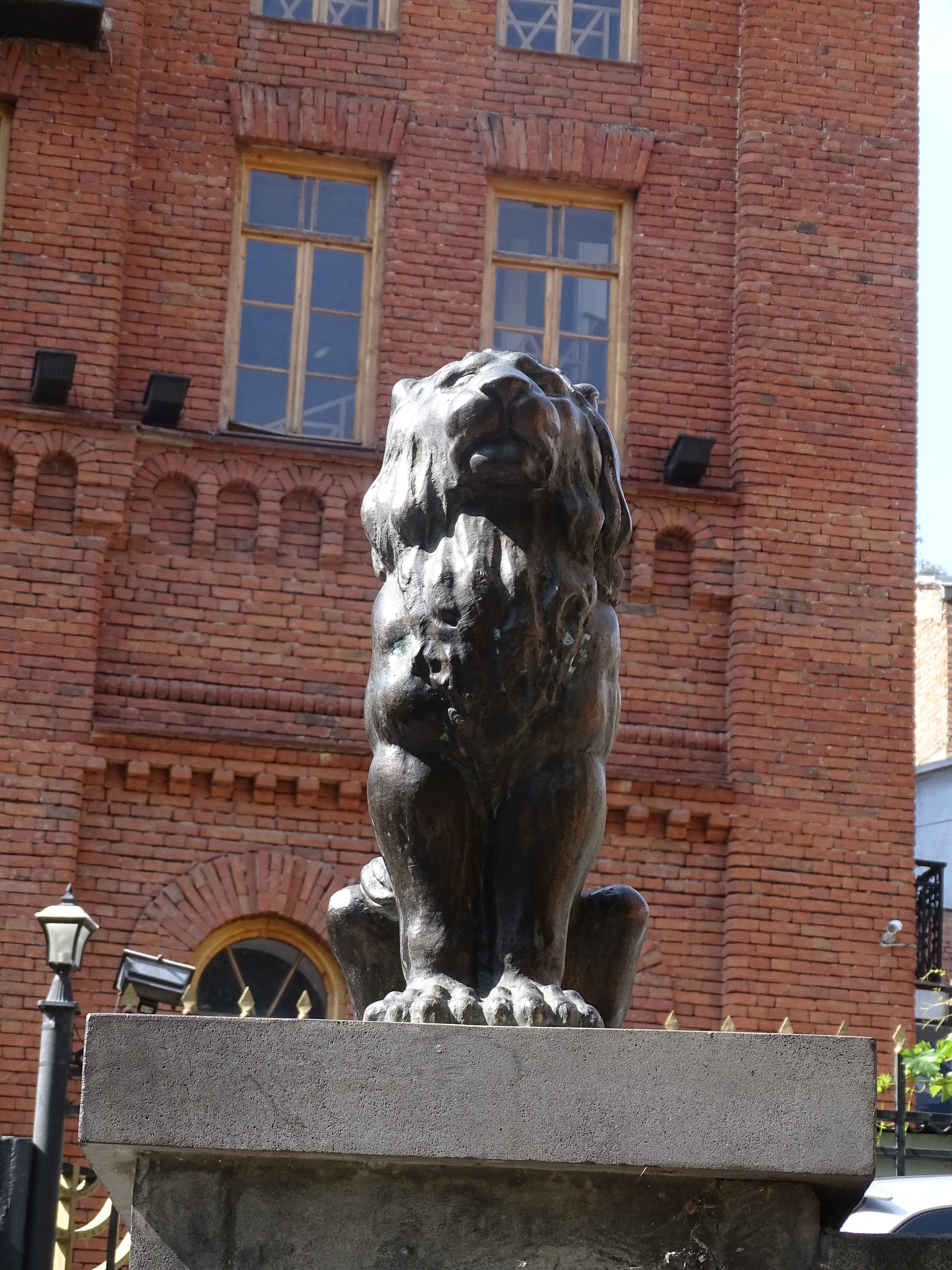

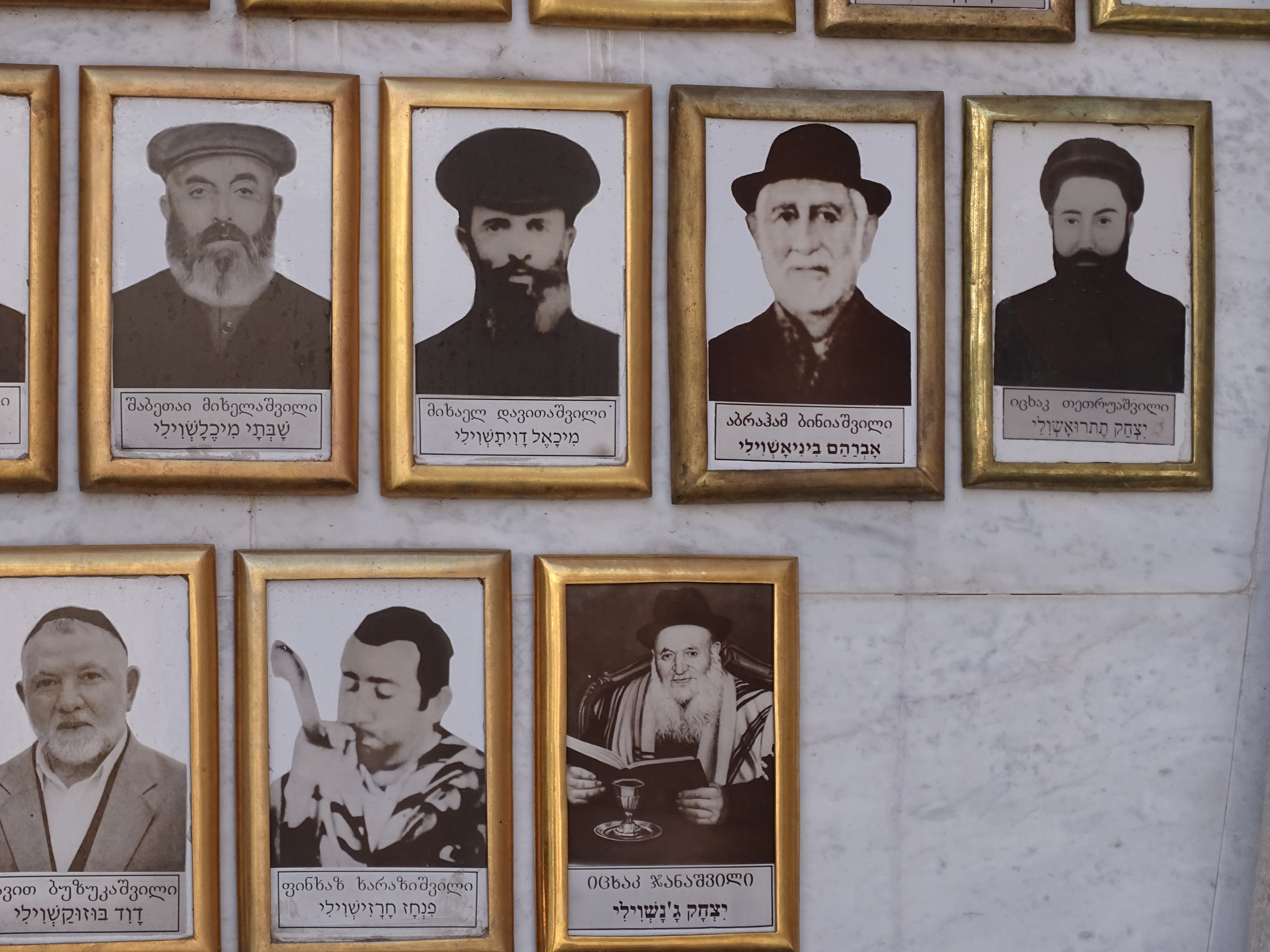

== See also ==
- History of the Jews in Georgia
