= Great Synagogue (Plzeň) =

Synagogue in Plzeň, Czech Republic

Great Synagogue, Plzeň
- Czech: Velká synagoga
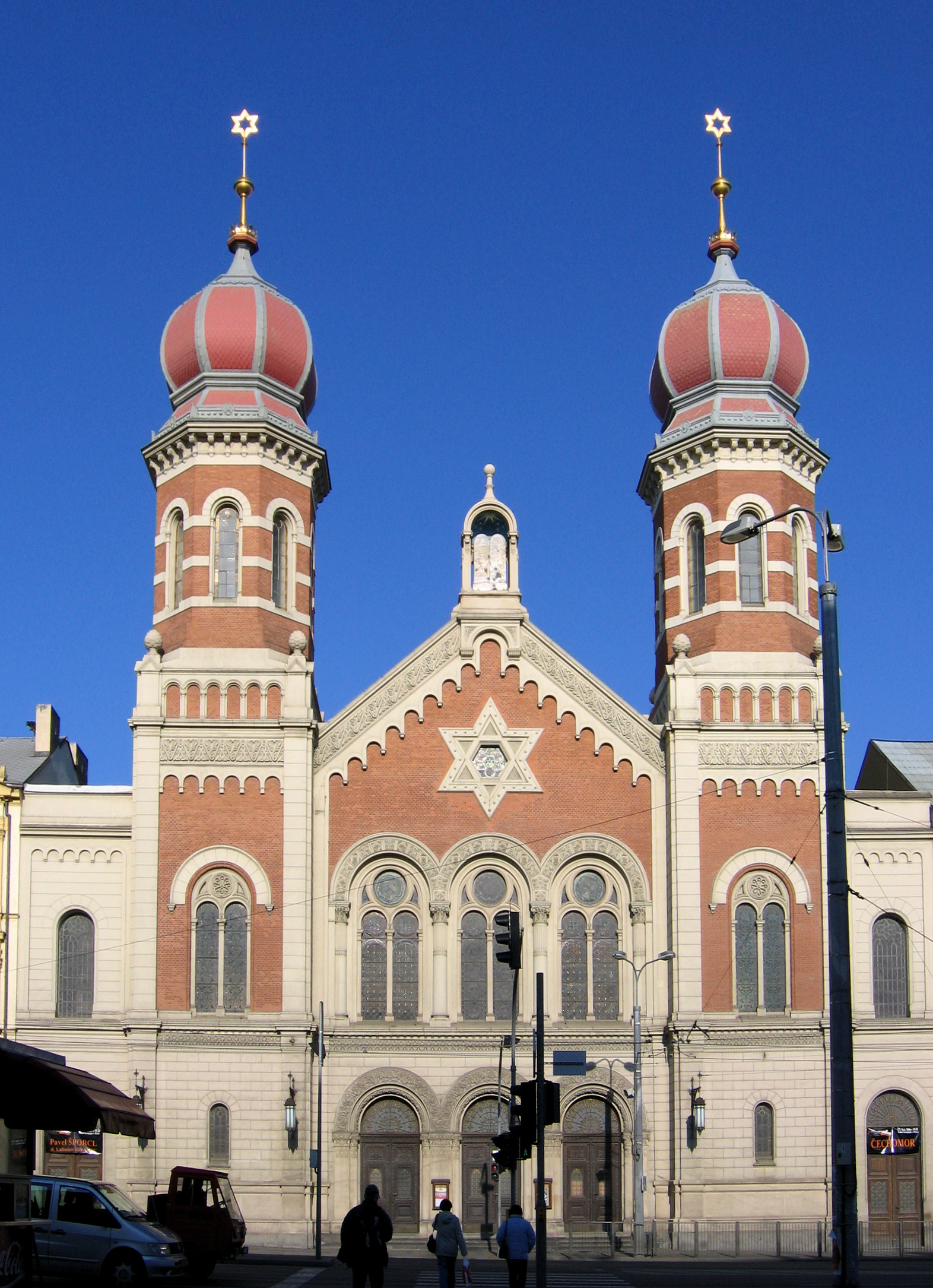
- The synagogue in 2006

- Location of the synagogue in the Czech Republic

Religion
- Affiliation: Judaism
- Rite: Nusach Ashkenaz
- Ecclesiastical or organisational status: Synagogue
- Status: Active

Location
- Location: Plzeň
- Country: Czech Republic
- Coordinates: 49°44′48″N 13°22′22″E

Architecture
- Architect: Emmanuel Klotz
- Type: Synagogue architecture
- Style: Moorish Revival; Romanesque Revival
- General contractor: Rudolf Štech
- Established: c. 1880 (as a congregation)
- Completed: 1893
- Construction cost: ƒ162,138

Specifications
- Direction of façade: East
- Capacity: 2,000+ worshippers
- Height (max): 45 metres (148 ft)
- Dome: Two
- Spire: One

Website
- www.zoplzen.cz

The Great Synagogue (Czech: Velká synagoga, Hebrew: בית הכנסת הגדול בפילסן) is a traditional Czech Jewish congregation and synagogue, located in Plzeň, in the Czech Republic. The synagogue is the second largest synagogue in Europe and third largest in the world. It is an active synagogue with regular services held by the local Jewish Community.

== History ==
A Viennese architect Max Fleischer drew up the original plans for the synagogue in Gothic style with granite buttresses and twin 65-metre (213 ft) towers. The cornerstone was laid on 2 December 1888 and that was about as far as it got. City councillors rejected the plan in a clear case of tower envy as they felt that the grand erection would compete with the nearby Cathedral of St. Bartholomew.

Emmanuel Klotz put forward a new design in 1890 retaining the original ground plan and hence the cornerstone, but lowering the towers by 20 metres (66 ft) and creating the distinctive look combining Romantic Revival and Renaissance Revival styles covered with Oriental decorations and a giant Star of David. The design was quickly approved and master builder Rudolf Štech completed work in 1893 for the bargain price of 162,138 florins. At the time the Jewish community in Plzeň numbered some 2,000.

The mixture of styles is truly bewildering; from the onion domes of a Russian Orthodox church, to the Arabic style ceiling, to the distinctly Indian looking Torah ark. The synagogue was used without interruption until the Nazi occupation of World War II. The synagogue was used as a storage facility during the war and was thereby spared from destruction. The Jewish community that retook possession of the synagogue at the end of hostilities had been decimated by the Holocaust. The last regular service was held in 1973, when the synagogue was closed down and fell into disrepair under communist rule.

Restoration was undertaken from 1995 to 1998, and the synagogue was reopened on 11 February 1998 at a cost of 63 million CZK. The central hall is now often used for concerts, while the walls host exhibitions of various causes. Renovation of interiors was carried out between 2019 and 2022. The synagogue is still used for worship, but only in what was formerly the winter prayer room. The present number of Plzeň Jews is roughly 200 people as of 2024.

== Gallery ==
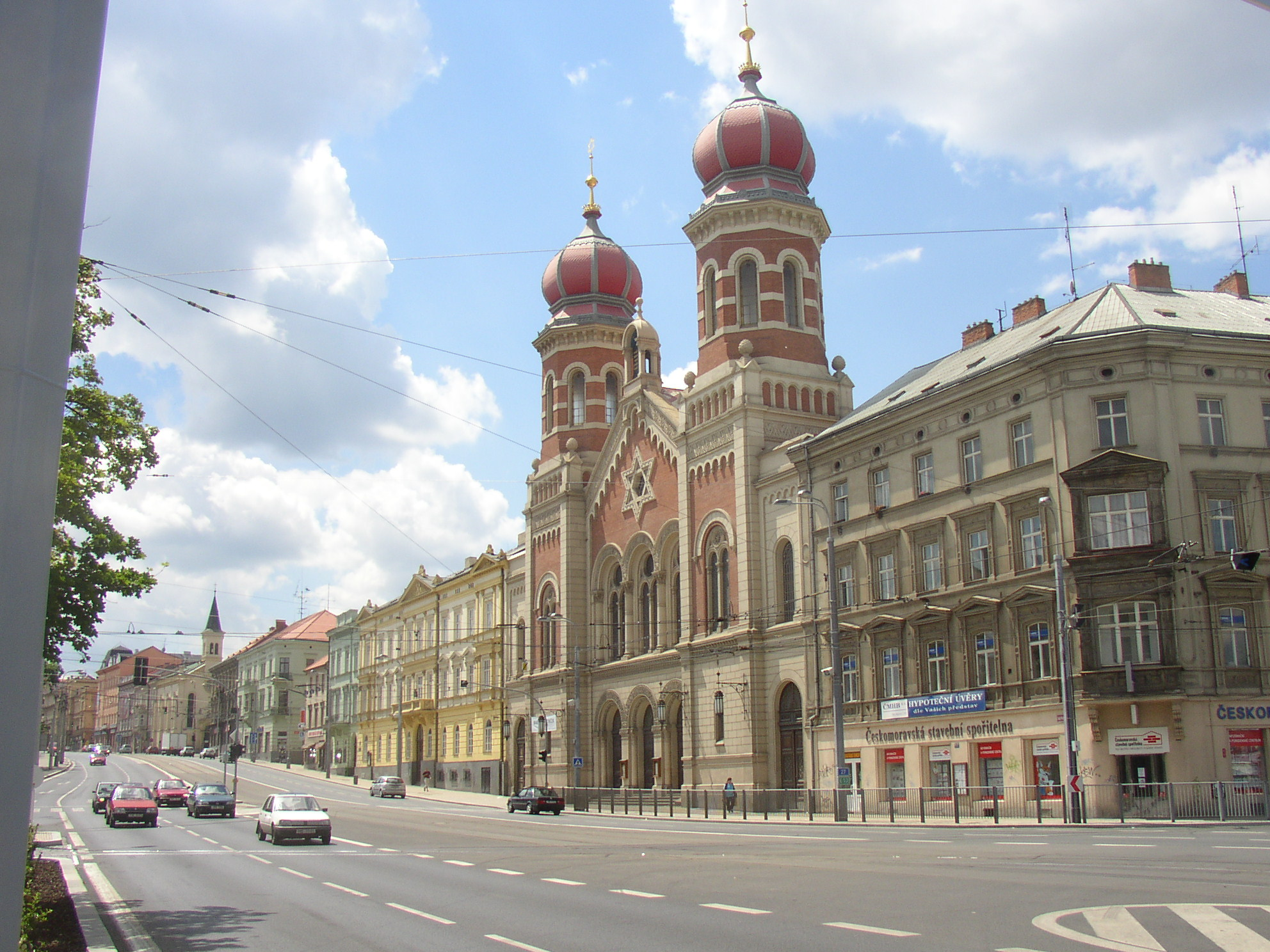

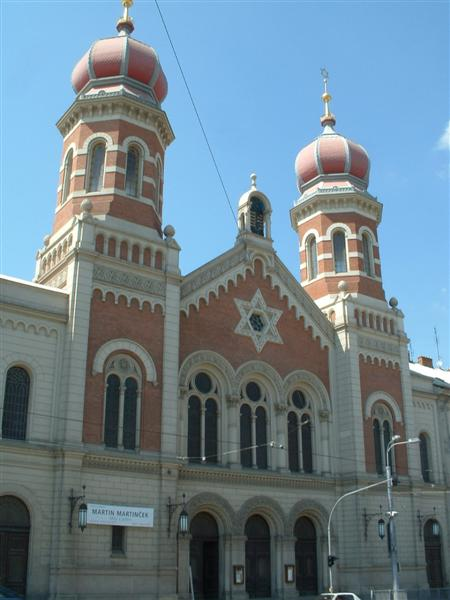

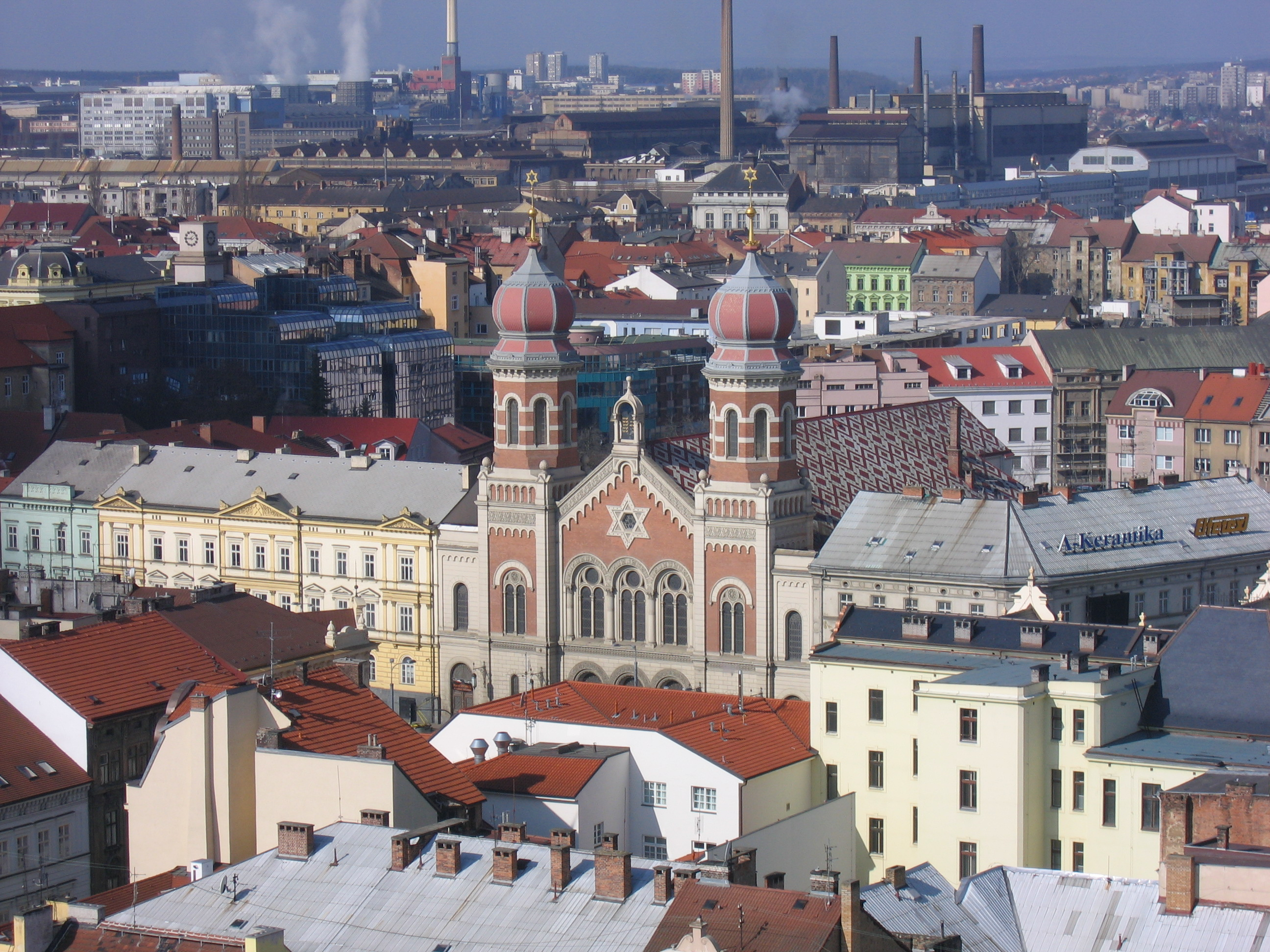

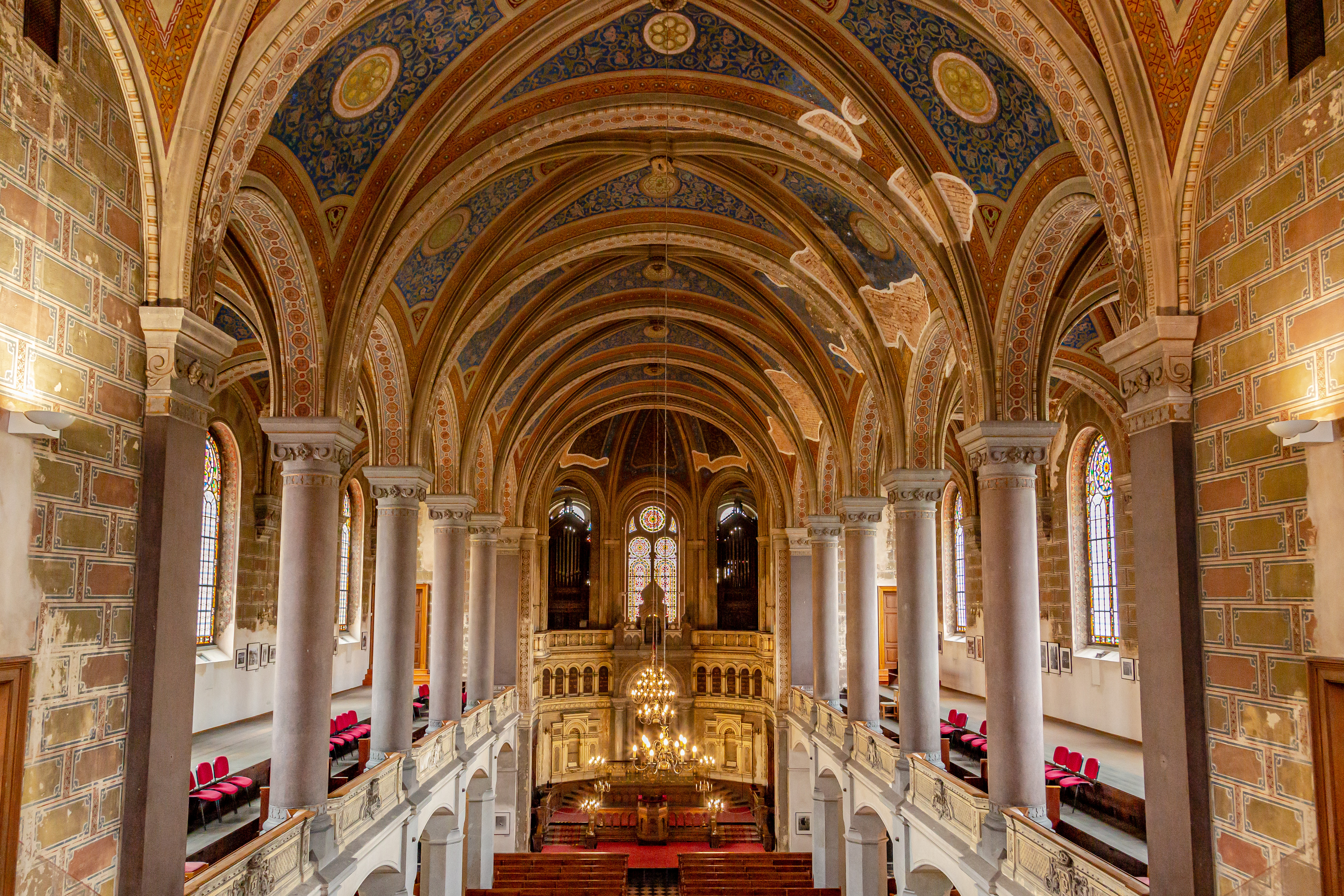

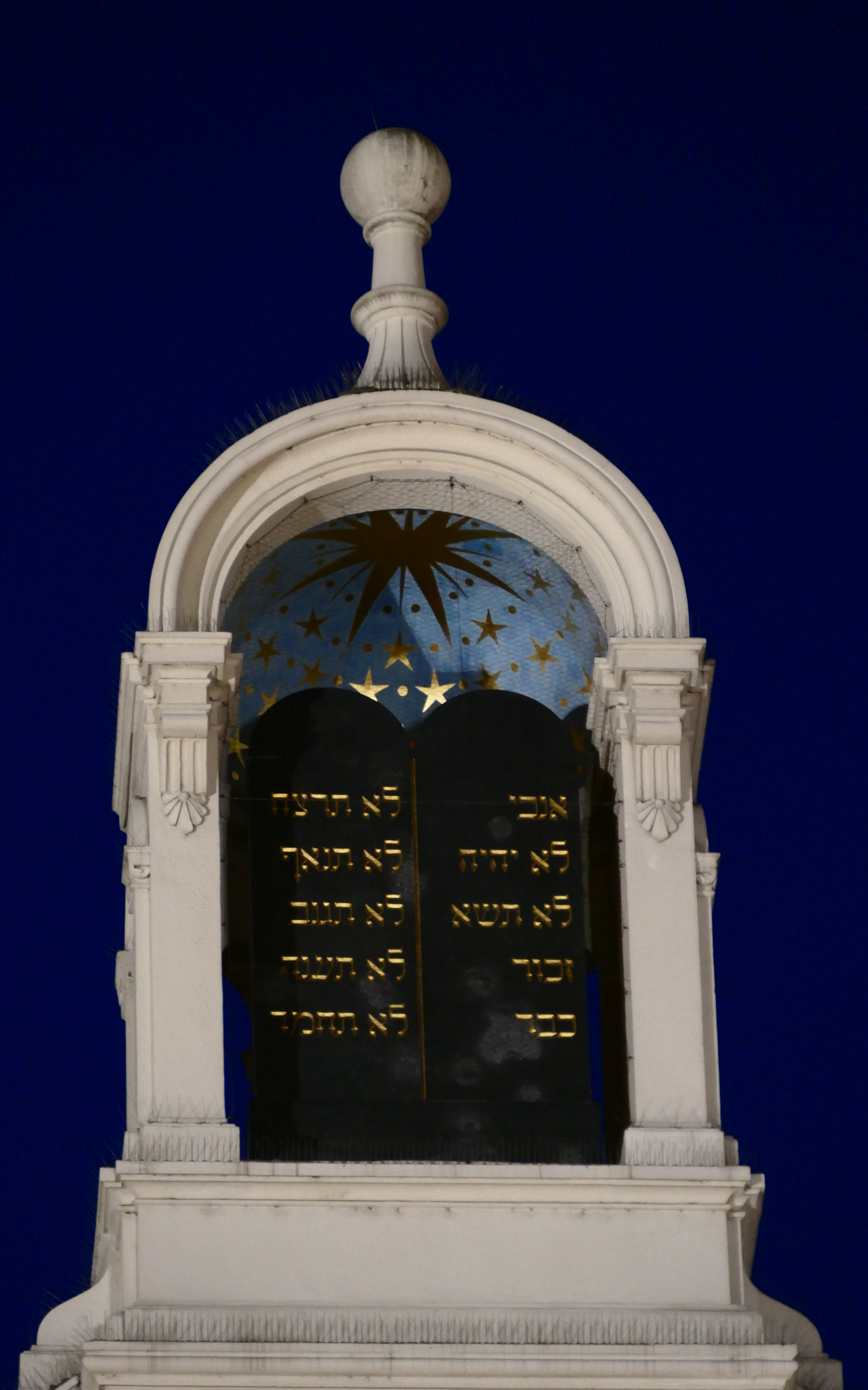

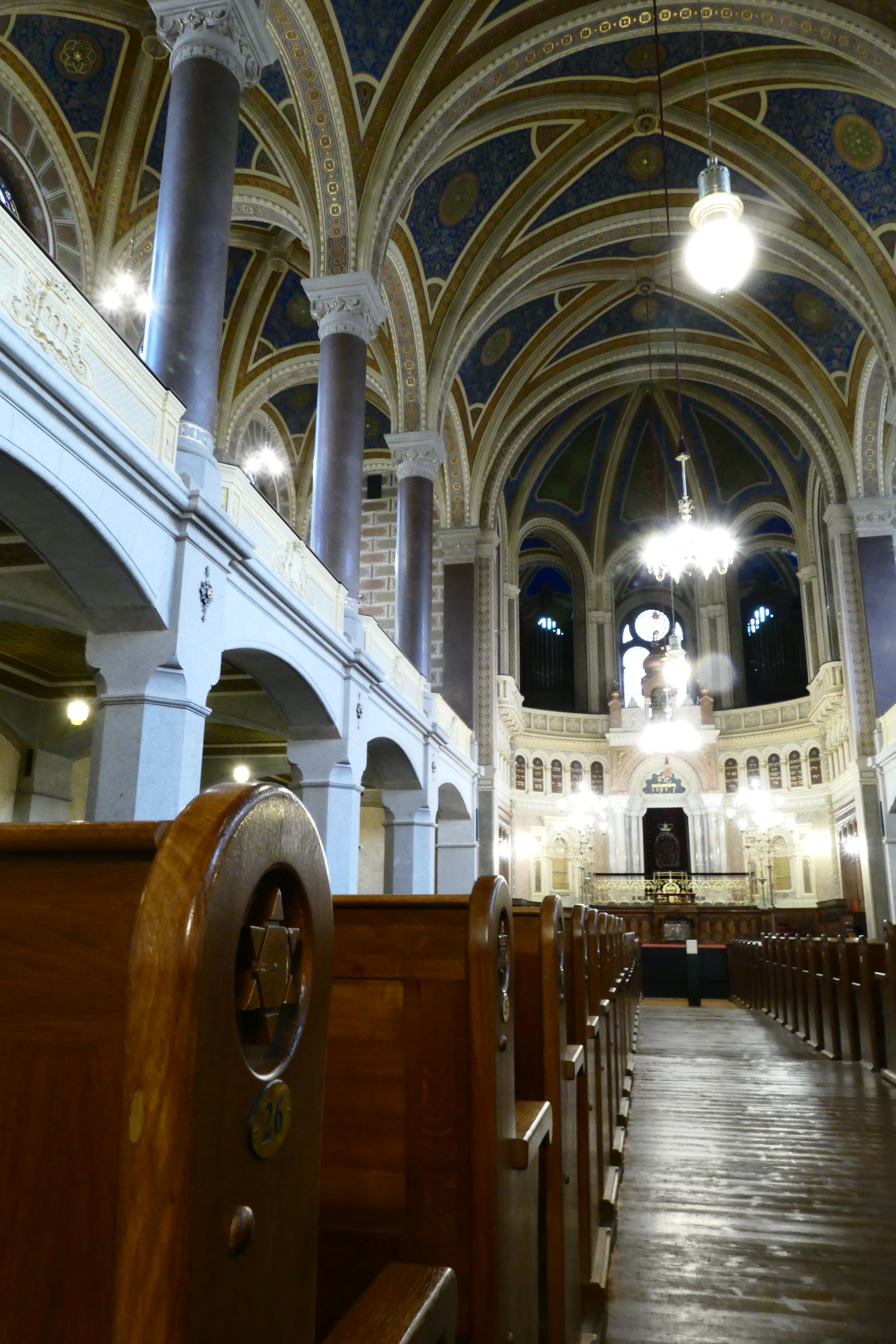

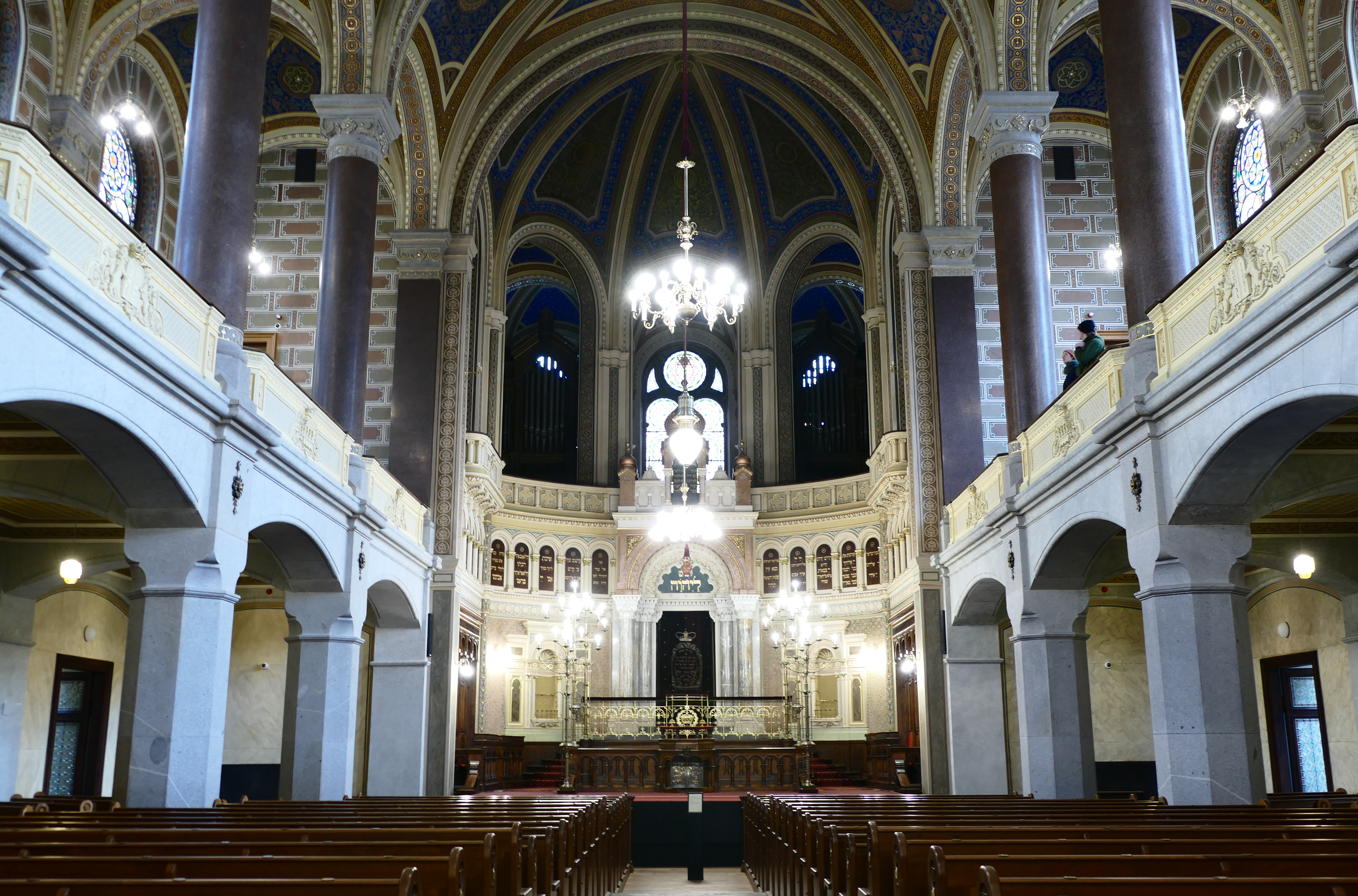

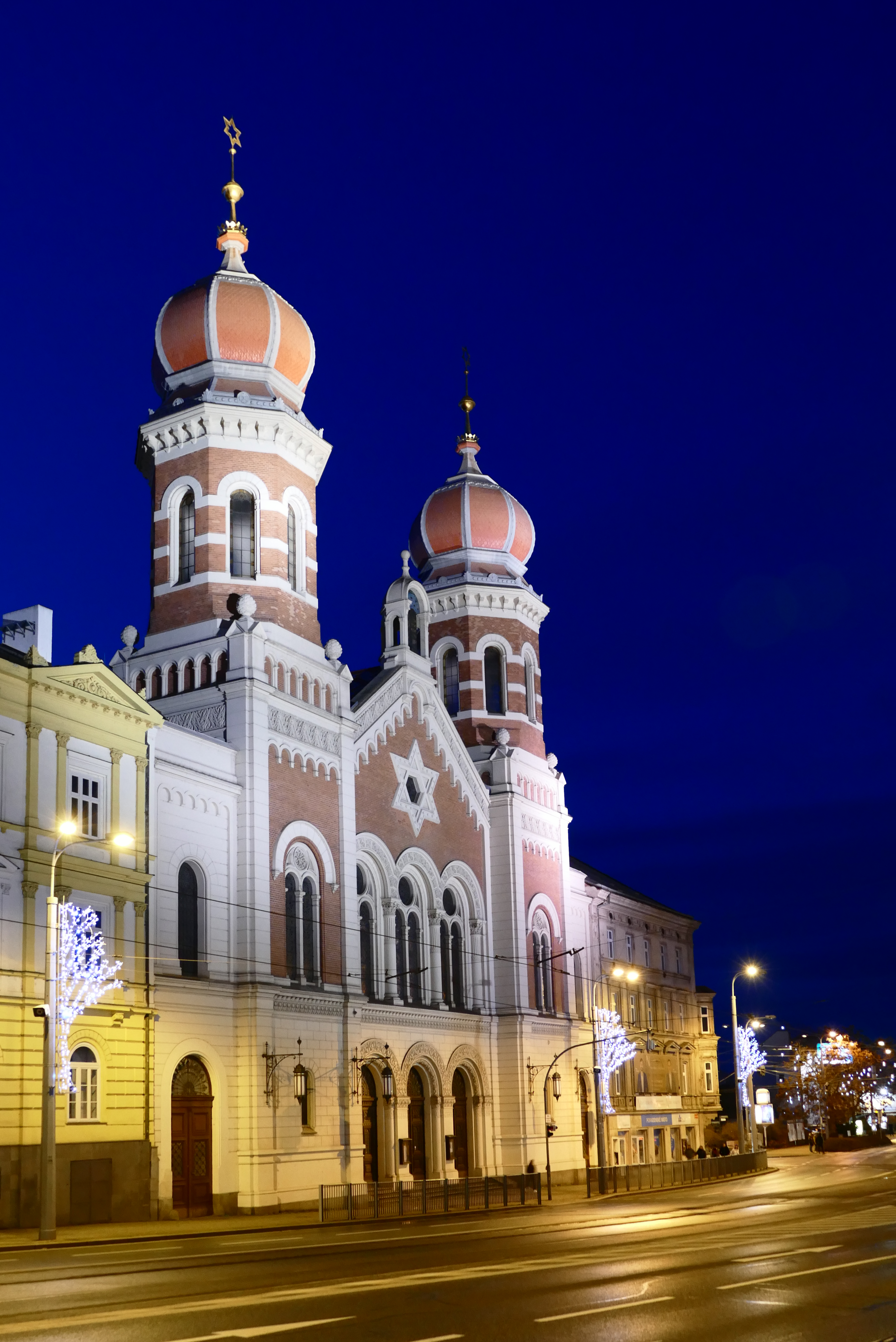

== See also ==
- History of the Jews in the Czech Republic
