= John Vipond Davies =

Welsh civil engineer (1862–1939)

- Born: 13 October 1862; Swansea, Wales
- Died: 4 October 1939 (aged 76); Flushing, New York City, U.S.
- Spouse: Ruth Ramsey (m. 1895; died 1931)
- Children: 3
- Engineering career
- Practice name: Jacobs & Davies
- Projects: Hudson & Manhattan Railroad
- Awards: Norman Medal (1913); Telford Medal (1914); Thomas Fitch Rowland Prize (1917)

John Vipond Davies (13 October 1862 – 4 October 1939) was a Welsh civil engineer and an expert in the design and construction of tunnels. He is primarily known for his work on projects in the United States, where he lived from 1889 until his death. Davies originally came to America to work on projects for Charles M. Jacobs and the two engineers formed the consulting engineering partnership of Jacobs & Davies in 1896. Davies was associated with the Hudson & Manhattan Railroad for a period of 37 years; he designed and constructed several components of its rapid transit system, including its tunnels under the Hudson River between New York City and New Jersey and its extensions in Manhattan and New Jersey. Later in his career, Davies served as a consulting engineer in an advisory role on the planning of major infrastructure projects across the United States.

== Early life ==
John Vipond Davies was born in Swansea, Wales, on 13 October 1862, to Andrew and Emily Vipond Davies (née Edmonds). His father was a surgeon and a justice of the peace and his mother was the niece of John Vipond, a major owner of coal mines in Varteg, Wales. His parents had a total of ten children—four sons and six daughters. John Vipond Davies was their oldest son and he was named after his great-uncle.

In 1874, the family moved to Cardiff, Wales after Andrew Davies left the medical practice and closed the partnership he had with his brother (Dr. Ebenezer Davies) to turn his attention to ownership of the family's coal mining enterprise. He became a director of John Vipond and Company in 1866, a year after the death of John Vipond (who had left shares of the company to his niece), and he had served as chairman of the firm since 1870.

John Vipond Davies was educated at Wesleyan College and London University.

== Career ==
Davies began working in the mines owned by John Vipond and Company in Varteg. From 1880 to 1884, he worked as an apprentice at the firm of Parfitt & Jenkins in Cardiff, where he gained experience in the manufacture of engines, railway equipment and fire brick, as well as the construction of dry docks and the mining of coal, iron ore, and limestone. He then worked at the Blaenavon Coal and Iron Company, eventually being promoted to the level of chief assistant engineer in 1888. Davies then spent eight months as the third engineer on a freighter operating in the waters off Australia to gain experience in the operation of engines.

Davies came to the United States in 1889, where he constructed an experimental plant for the Philadelphia and Reading Coal and Iron Company (P&R C&I) near Mahanoy City, Pennsylvania that manufactured coal briquette from anthracite culm. He performed the work for the English civil engineer Charles M. Jacobs, who in turn was working for Austin Corbin. Davies later managed Corbin's mining plants in the Anthracite Coal Region of Pennsylvania. He subsequently relocated to New York City to work with Jacobs on planned improvements to the Long Island Rail Road (LIRR) for Corbin.

Jacobs opened a consulting engineering office in New York City in 1891, with Davies serving as his chief assistant. The two engineers would form a partnership in 1896; their firm was named Jacobs & Davies. (Note: The firm's first project involved the construction of a pumping plant for the Montauk Water Company that could produce one million US gallons (3.8 Ml) of water per day from artesian wells for the LIRR.) Working with Jacobs, Davies served as the chief assistant engineer on the design and construction of the Ravenswood Tunnel under the East River for the East River Gas Company. Completed in 1894, it was the first subaqueous tunnel to be completed in New York City.

After completion of the Ravenswood Tunnel, Davies served as the chief engineer responsible for the design and construction of the West Virginia Short Line Railroad, the Kanawha and Pocahontas Railroad (also in West Virginia), and the Atlantic Avenue Improvement of the LIRR, the latter of which involved two and a half miles (4.0 km) of tunnel and three miles (4.8 km) of viaduct to eliminate grade crossings along the Atlantic Branch in Brooklyn. The firm of Jacobs & Davies was also involved with preliminary studies for the Pennsylvania Railroad's system of tunnels under the East and Hudson rivers.

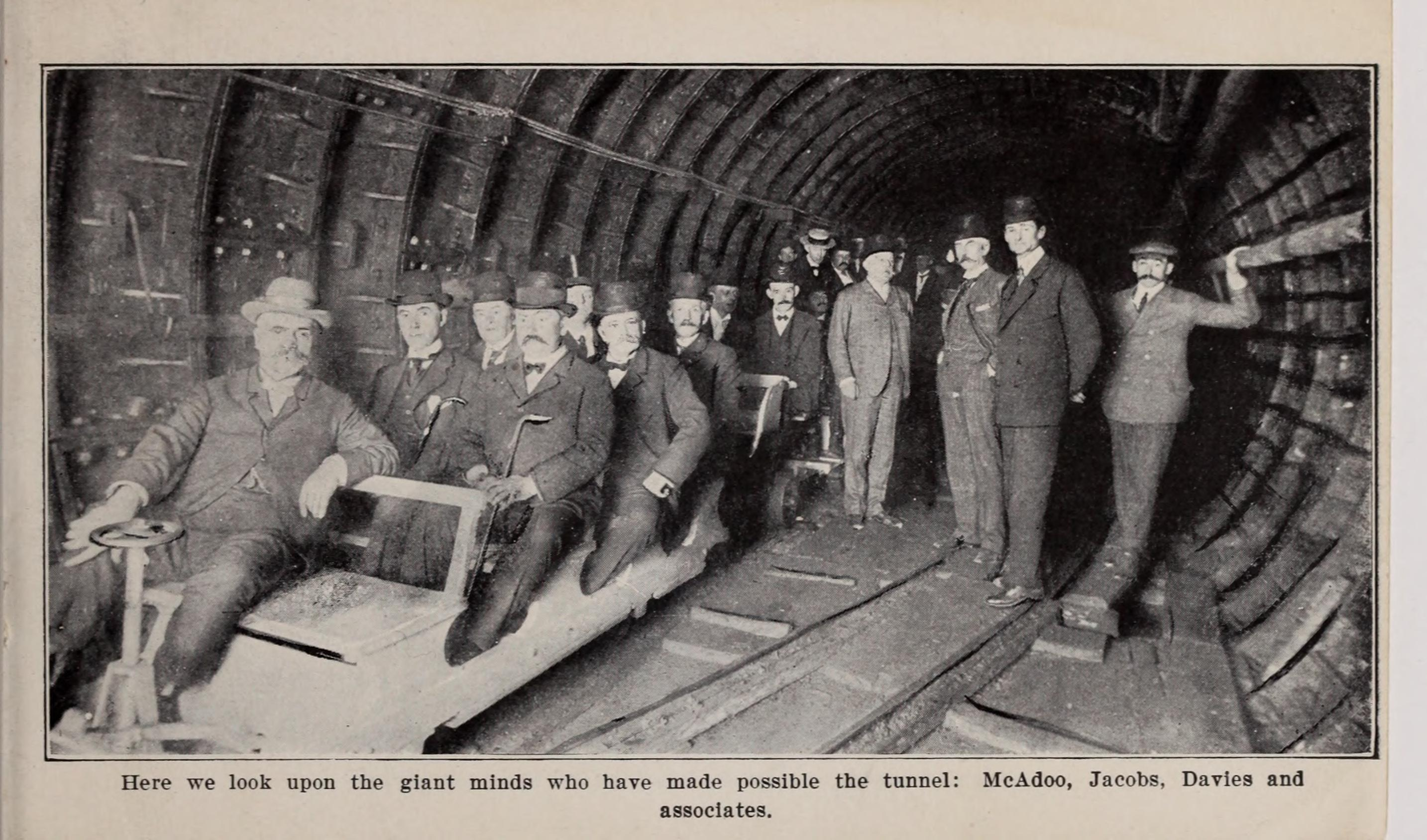
Davies pictured along Jacobs, William McAdoo and others in the first party to go through the Uptown Hudson Tubes.

The firm was then selected to complete the partially-built Uptown Hudson Tubes, which were holed through in 1904 and were the first tunnels completed under the Hudson River. Davies began as the deputy chief engineer and later served as chief engineer for the four tunnels of the Hudson & Manhattan Railroad (H&M), including the Downtown Hudson Tubes, which provided a connection between three railroad terminals in New Jersey and Manhattan. (Note: The three railroad terminals included the Delaware, Lackawanna and Western Railroad terminal in Hoboken, the Erie Railroad terminal in Jersey City, and the Pennsylvania Railroad terminal in Jersey City.) Davies also directed the construction of the foundation and substructure for the H&M's Hudson Terminal in Lower Manhattan. He also served as the chief engineer of the projects to expand the H&M, including the extensions of the system to the termini at 33rd Street in Manhattan and Newark in New Jersey. Davies subsequently served as president, vice-president, director, and chief engineer of the H&M, and overall he was associated with the company for a period of 37 years.

Davies was the engineer-in-charge of construction of the Hales Bar Dam in Tennessee and the Astoria Tunnel under the East River for the Consolidated Gas Company. He was also the engineer-in-charge of the contractors working on the excavation for Grand Central Terminal in Manhattan for the New York Central Railroad.

He also served as a consulting engineer for a number of projects including the construction of the Paris Metro tunnel under the Seine and Place de la Concorde, a total of 26 tunnels along the Laxaxalpam Aqueduct in Mexico for the Mexican Light and Power Company, subway projects of the Brooklyn Rapid Transit Company—including modifications to the Centre Street Loop in Manhattan and construction of the 38th Street Yard in Brooklyn, and a subaqueous water supply tunnel for the city of Detroit.

Towards the end of his career, Davies held an advisory role in the planning of several major infrastructure projects across the United States. This work included serving on the board of consulting engineers for construction of the Holland Tunnel under the Hudson River between New York City and New Jersey, a board of advisors that investigated the feasibility of constructing a crossing of the Mississippi River at New Orleans, and on a board of consulting engineers for the Moffat Tunnel in Colorado. In 1921, Davies traveled to California along with Ralph Modjeski to investigate the engineering challenges associated with constructing a crossing of San Francisco Bay and suggest a feasible solution; Davies and Modjeski were invited for their expertise in tunnels and bridges, respectively. The two engineers recommended a combination of a 3,000-foot-long (910 m) tunnel and a 12,000-foot-long (3,700 m) bridge between San Francisco and Oakland.

== Professional societies and awards ==
Davies was elected as a member of the American Society of Civil Engineers (ASCE) on 6 June 1894; he served as a director of the national society from 1915 to 1918 and later as president of the newly-formed ASCE section in New York City from 1921 to 1922. (Note: The New York Section of ASCE was formed in 1920 and renamed as the Metropolitan Section in 1931.) Davies was the recipient of three awards from ASCE, including the Norman Medal in 1913 for his paper on "Air Resistances to Trains in Tube Tunnels", the Thomas Fitch Rowland Prize in 1917 for his paper on "The Astoria Tunnel under the East River for Gas Distribution in New York City", and a silver bronze medal—the second prize of the Phebe Hobson Fowler Professional Award—in 1930 for serving as the chairperson for the special committee that prepared a report on "Charges and Method of Making Charges for Professional Services".

He was elected as a member of the Institution of Civil Engineers in 1910, from which he was awarded the Telford Medal in 1914 for his paper on "Extensions of the Hudson River Tunnels of the Hudson and Manhattan Railroad Company".

Davies served as the president of United Engineering Society from 1920 to 1923. He also was a charter member and one of the engineers who helped to form the American Institute of Consulting Engineers, for which he served on its committee on Professional Practice and Ethics from 1921 until his death. Davies also was a member of the American Institute of Mining Engineers.

== Personal life ==
Davies married Ruth Ramsey on 16 April 1895 in Pottsville, Pennsylvania. (Note: Davies had previously lived in Pottsville while he was constructing the plant for the P&R C&I.) The couple had three children—two daughters and one son—and resided on Bowne Street in Flushing, Queens. In 1907, while on his way to work, Davies risked his life to save a group of school children in Flushing from a team of runaway horses; he was confined to his bed for several weeks after the accident, which broke his hip and resulted in internal injuries. He became a citizen of the United States in 1918. Davies' wife died in 1931.

He served as president of the St. George's Society of New York from 1922 to 1923 and served on the board of governors for the Railroad Club of New York for several years. Davies was also a member of the Engineers' Club of New York and the Pilgrims of the United States. Before coming to the United States, Davies played rugby for Cardiff FC, during which the team won the South Wales Challenge Cup in 1881. He served as president of the Oakland Golf Club in Bayside, Queens, from 1914 to 1919 as well as in 1936, winning a club handicap at the golf course in 1916.

Davies died of a heart attack at his home in Flushing on 4 October 1939. He is buried at Presbyterian Cemetery in Pottsville.

== Publications ==
- Davies, J. Vipond (17 September 1909). "The Hudson & Manhattan Tunnel System I". Railroad Age Gazette. Vol. 47, no. 12. pp. 492–497. ProQuest 886559046.
- Davies, J. Vipond (24 September 1909). "The Hudson & Manhattan Tunnel System II". Railroad Age Gazette. Vol. 47, no. 13. pp. 539–545. ProQuest 886558894.
- Davies, J. Vipond (1 October 1909). "The Hudson & Manhattan Tunnel System III". Railroad Age Gazette. Vol. 47, no. 14. pp. 585–587. ProQuest 895762048.
- Davies, J. Vipond (8 October 1909). "The Hudson & Manhattan Tunnel System IV". Railroad Age Gazette. Vol. 47, no. 15. pp. 640–643. ProQuest 882967662.
- Davies, J. Vipond (15 October 1909). "The Hudson & Manhattan Tunnel System V". Railroad Age Gazette. Vol. 47, no. 16. pp. 701–707. ProQuest 882978142.
- Davies, J. Vipond (22 October 1909). "The Hudson & Manhattan Tunnel System VI". Railroad Age Gazette. Vol. 47, no. 17. pp. 745–748. ProQuest 882974039.
- Davies, John Vipond (December 1912). "Air Resistances to Trains in Tube Tunnels". Transactions of the American Society of Civil Engineers. 75 (1): 982–1029. doi:10.1061/TACEAT.0002376.
- Davies, J. V. (1914). "Extensions of the Hudson River Tunnels of the Hudson and Manhattan Railroad Company". Minutes of the Proceedings of the Institution of Civil Engineers. 197 (1914): 185–211. doi:10.1680/imotp.1914.16387.
- Davies, John Vipond (January 1916). "The Astoria Tunnel Under the East River for Gas Distribution in New York City". Transactions of the American Society of Civil Engineers. 80 (1). doi:10.1061/TACEAT.0002741.
- Davies, J. Vipond (17 April 1924). "Progress in the Art of Tunneling". Engineering News-Record. Vol. 92, no. 16. pp. 674–679.
