= History of the Jews in Kingston upon Hull =

Kingston upon Hull, on England's East Coast was, by 1750, a major point of entry into Britain for traders and migrants, second only to London for links to the continent. Around then, a few Jews from German and Dutch cities lodged and settled in Hull. Selling jewelry and dealing goods in the thriving port and market town, they maintained contacts with Europe, London, and other, particularly Northern, towns. The small community produced its own institutions and leaders, which were tested by anti-Jewish sentiment, and later by an influx of East-European refugees.

Communal efforts to support the arrival of Jews – mostly bound for America – encouraged some to stay, who then thrived particularly well in retail trades, and grew to be a community of over 2,500. Although probably never more than 1% of the area population, by the end of the twentieth century the Jews of Hull made an impact on the life of the city, and some became known in the broader world. Among the sons and daughters of the Jews of Hull (as well as numerous Lord Mayors and Sheriffs of Hull) were three Fellows of the Royal Society, the founder of the world's largest furniture maker, prominent doctors and lawyers, as well as actress Dame Maureen Lipman. See Notable People below.

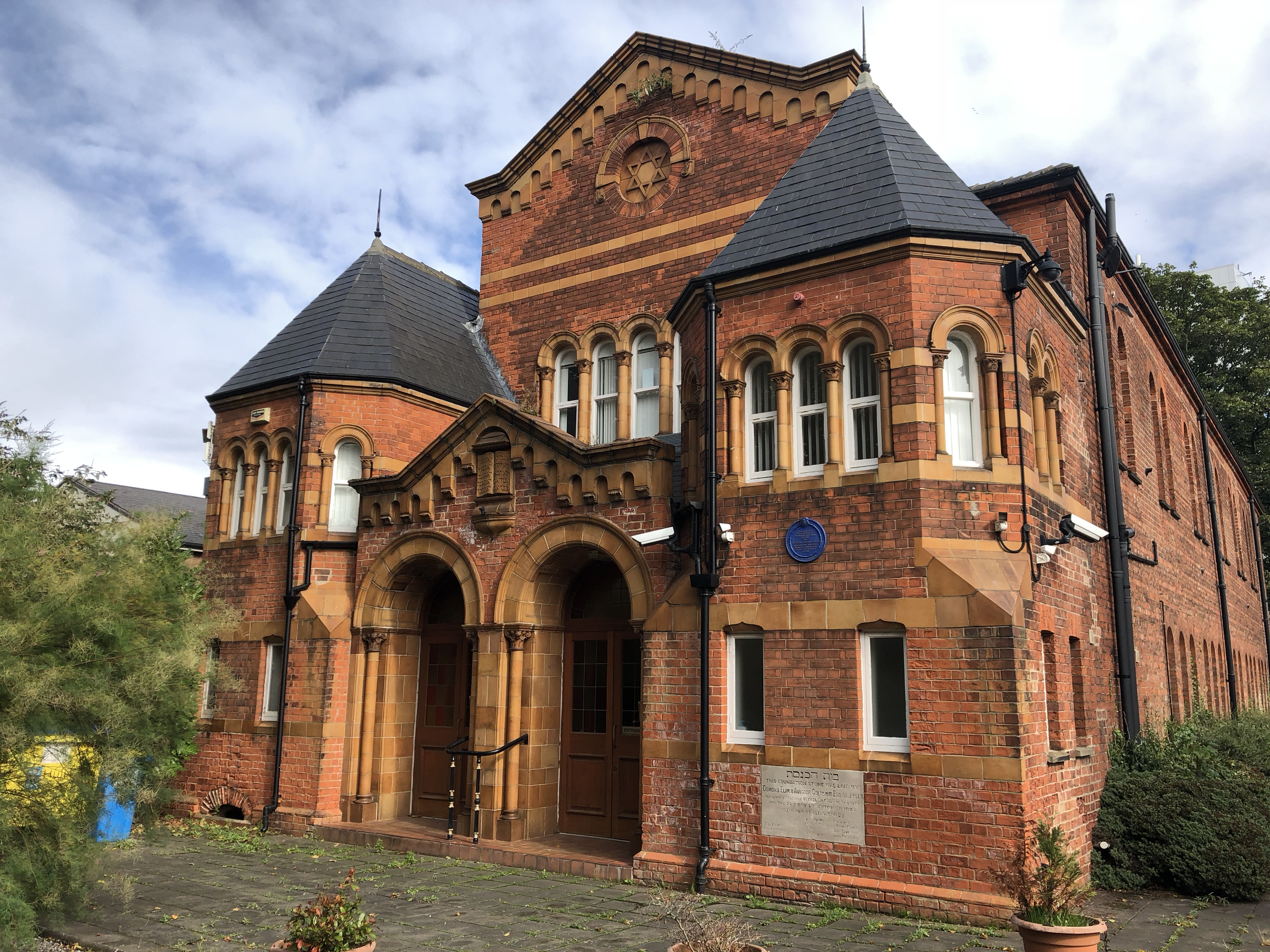
Former Western Synagogue, Linnaeus Street, Hull, a Grade II listed building

== Culture ==
As elsewhere, Jews in Hull gathered for Hebrew rites, and to make arrangements for kosher meat, in hastily opened synagogues (see Synagogues, below). The East-European Ashkenazim and Dutch Sephardim Jews intermarried, thus uniting early rival congregations. Family, business and institutional links with Jewish communities in London and other towns were always important. As they were largely excluded from society in Britain as in Europe, the Jews of Hull were for a time mostly poor, and their livelihoods were made via pawnbroking, dealing in valuables, jewelry, and later, silver and gold work, watch and clockmaking, as well as importing goods. Prosperity brought better synagogues, improved access to kosher provisions, and wider charitable, civic and professional activity.

Newcomers fleeing Russian oppression came via North Sea and Baltic ports, skilled as tailors, drapers, cobblers, cabinetmakers, market traders and travelers. Established English and German Jews assisted those struggling in lodgings and terraces near the docks, as tensions and growing families spawned multiple synagogues. Jewish life in Hull came to reflect the restrained Litvak observance and eastern Yiddish of the old Grand Duchy of Lithuania, a culture wiped out by the Tsars, Nazis and Soviets. More refugees were added by two World Wars. The severe Hull Blitz, and the drama of the State of Israel, furthered communal spirit, as did local Jewish entertainers.

Facing acculturation, Hull Jewry has since followed varied observant, assimilated and secular lifestyles, as elsewhere. Like other provincial communities, and North-Eastern ports, career and family have drawn them away into a diaspora, across the UK and abroad. In 2016 the Hull community gathered to celebrate its 250-year history, which is documented in an archive, a key paper, various books, and online resources.

== Demography ==
Jewish life in Hull grew in the bustling Old Town, perhaps 40 people in 1793, 60 in 1815, and 200 in 1835, with a few trading out in Beverley, York, Scarborough and Lincolnshire towns. A move west, around the arterial Hessle and Anlaby Roads, and also Beverley Road, centred on Porter Street and the upmarket Coltman Street. The proportion of new young immigrants was always high, from mid-century settling around Osborne Street, growing the community to over 300 by 1851, 550 in 1870, and 2,000 by 1900. These families also progressed out along the same thoroughfares, accelerated by wartime bombing. The old housing and shops of Hull were decimated by the Luftwaffe, even before the era of slum clearance. Motorcars enabled more Jews to reside in the western suburbs outside the City – Anlaby and Kirk Ella, as well as Willerby, Hessle and Ferriby.

After the war Hull-born Jews predominated, the area community peaking at 2,500 to 3,000, including some unlisted at synagogue or census, not counting the small, linked community in Grimsby across the Humber. Jews were barely 1% of the city's population, or the wider suburbs. Assimilation, relocation, and emigration have since taken their toll, most leaving for London, Manchester, Leeds, and Israel, with now 200 or less in the Hull area, mainly older people in recent years.

== Early history ==
=== Pre-1700 ===
Before the expulsion of 1290, Jewish leaders at Lincoln and York, lent monies to nearby ports Barton-upon-Humber, and Bridlington Priory. Several of their credit agents, are recorded as named Jews of the ports of Grimsby, and Hedon, which is now just outside Hull; and at Beverley, which is in the Hull Valley. The same figures at Lincoln and York at times dealt or took payment in wool, as did the Jew Jacob de Hedon.

Close by, the large wool-producer Meaux Abbey, bought estates indebted to these Jews, and borrowed from them for construction, whilst also developing the Hull river-mouth as a major centre, for wool-merchants from England and Europe. Thus it is plausible that the early development of Hull was funded by Jews. Nevertheless, unlike a community in Newcastle up to the year 1234, nothing is recorded of Jews resident in the early port of Hull.

Oliver Cromwell defended Hull during the English Civil War, before in 1656 starting the resettlement of the Jews in England. Oft-repeated claims of a presence in Hull toward the year 1700, are discounted by scholars as being based on false recollections or forgeries. Recorded communal memory suggests the first settlers in Hull were sometime after 1700.

=== Settlement ===
The first known arrival is of Israel Benjamin in 1734, claiming to be a convert, who later died in Leeds. Thereafter, at a time of persecution in Europe, it is documented that Jews came into Hull from Germany, Holland, Denmark, Sweden, Prussia, Poland and the Baltic, bound for large Northern towns or London, some claiming to be converts to Christianity. Merchants came from other English ports, for Hull's Napoleonic era Naval Prize Court. Traders settled around the Holy Trinity Church marketplace, being in effect legally free in Hull to set up business; Jews ran many stalls and shops there until the late 1960s.

In 1766, Isaac Levy of Church Lane was the first recorded resident, founding one of many dynasties of jewellers and watchmakers, with others soon in the lanes off Marketplace; located there was the equestrian statue of William III, for the 1788 Protestant Accession centenary, decorated with an elegant crown, by Aaron Jacobs, jeweller and silversmith, forbear of synagogue presidents and clockmakers. As some diversified into market bazaars and general trading, there were Jewish barbers (Abraham Levis, 1791), cobblers (Michael Levy, 1812), tailors (Henry Levy, 1812) and cabinet-makers (Henry Meyer, 1826). In 1822 Joseph Levi was a "quil and pencil merchant," and Samuel Lazarus a hatmaker. In 1831 Joseph Jacobs ran a coffee house, and in 1834 Baruchson and Fawcett were importers and dealers in cigars.

=== Advancement ===
Moses Symons, bullion dealer and watchmaker, was a Navy Agent, and in 1810 a founder member of the Humber Lodge of Freemasons, which later had synagogue president and silversmith Elias Hart as its Master mason.

Philanthropist Bethel Jacobs (1812–69), son and son-in-law to community leaders Israel Jacobs, and Joseph Lyon (see Synagogues), became Master of the Humber Lodge and a Town Councillor, as well as synagogue president. Returned from Leipzig studies to his father's Whitefriargate silversmiths and clockmakers, he oversaw a workshop as polymath and inventor. A charismatic lecturer, president of Hull Literary & Philosophical Society, and the Mechanics' Institute, he led Hull at the 1851 Great Exhibition. Drawing the 1853 Association for the Advancement of Science to Hull, and after Victoria and Albert stayed at the (to be Royal) Station Hotel in 1854, Bethel became Jeweller to Her Majesty. Later Lieutenant of Hull Volunteer Rifle Corps, and president of Hull's Royal Institution, he founded Hull College of Art in 1861.

Simeon Mosely (1815–88), prominent dental surgeon, was synagogue president, a Town Councillor, captain in the local volunteer brigade, and 1864 founding Worshipful Master of the Kingston Lodge. Longstanding mason Solomon Cohen (1827–1907), Sheffield-born clothier and synagogue president, was a Hull Town Councillor for Marketplace ward from 1870, later an Alderman, chairman of Hull School Board and president of Hull Guardian Society.

== The Great Migration ==
=== Emigration ===
Victorian England's lack of restriction on refugees saw port arrivals increase, especially after the continental revolutionary unrest of 1848, enabled by the transport revolution of steam-ships and trains. Whilst tens of millions of Jews left mainland Europe between 1850 and 1914 by direct liner to America, the Wilson Line and other shipping companies ensured that over two million trans-migrants of all creeds traversed Hull's docks and railways, and up to a million Grimsby's. This indirect route was not only much cheaper, for those observing strict kosher eating and other tenets, the shorter voyages were also less stressful.

About one in four of Hull's trans-migrants were Jews, destined via Liverpool for New York or Buenos Aires, as well as for the Cape and also British towns. An expanding young population of Yiddish-speaking Ashkenazim was leaving Russia's Pale of Settlement, due to work restrictions, special taxes, and the forced conscription and conversion of boys which was fueling emigration. Murderous anti-Semitic pogroms (riots) after 1881, publicised even in Hull, and famine in 1891–2, further escalated departures from the Russian Empire into the new century.

=== Travelling to Hull ===
In addition to the hope of a welcoming, gilded "New Jerusalem," emigration was often underpinned by informative correspondence with relatives. Chain migration among Jews—specifically from Lithuanian towns via the Baltic to Northern English port – has been described. Even so, passage to Hull was often booked through unscrupulous agents. Husbands or eldest sons left first, and completed an arduous cross-border journeys by foot, cart, and train, to Hamburg and Bremen, or Baltic ports like Libau and Riga.

Larger vessels on the Baltic traversed the dangerous Kattegat, until in 1895 the Kiel Canal opened, before the journey onward to Hull (or Grimsby, or Goole). Carrying a little kosher food, such as herring with stale bread, migrants embarked onto cargo or cattle boats, for several cramped nights on straw pallets, wood boards or rolling decks, sometimes in befouled and unsafe conditions. One gale in 1845 claimed 26 ships off Holland, whilst the crew of a Hull-bound cargo steamer, having survived overnight lashed to the rigging, realized the deaths of all 16 passengers. They were Polish Jews "chiefly in needy circumstances," mostly travelling jewelers and families. Amongst the bodies was a mother and five children, and a man reportedly stood upright, holding an open prayer book in his extended hand. Death and disease amongst the migrants was common.

Some lost luggage or had no onward tickets, and sometimes most arrived destitute. On landing many walked into the Old Town to temporary lodgings, like Posterngate's Harry Lazarus Hotel, (a grave name in Delhi Street cemetery). Most proceeded west, by Osborne Street to Anlaby Road, busy with horse-drawn traffic, across to the segregated Emigrant Waiting Room. Built in 1871 by the North Eastern Railway, a kosher kitchen and washing rooms were later added; now a listed building, it is currently (Hull City AFC the) Tigers Lair pub. Behind, Platform 13 of Paragon Station took extra-long Monday or Wednesday trains, bound for Leeds and Liverpool; London, Southampton and Glasgow were also common destinations. From 1885 the new Alexandra Dock had a water-side railway hall, in use until 1908–9.

=== Staying or moving on ===
Whilst most migrants from the "Old Country" were transitory through Hull, many stayed (intentionally or otherwise) for days, weeks, or for years. Often, young men lodged temporarily with Jewish families in narrow lanes and terraced streets, borrowing money to work as ragged hawkers, later succeeding as jewelers and watch-dealers. Frequently, illegal marriages occurred among the migrants. For some who stayed, their grown children eventually continued the journey, like Benjamin Hart (born Hull 1869), who sailed for America in 1912, but was lost on the Titanic. He placed both his wife and their young daughter, Eva Hart, into a life-boat; she lived to be 91 years old, possibly the last survivor who remembered the Titanic disaster.

== Charities and clubs ==
A large number of active Hull Jewish societies were founded, with branches of many national and some international associations, all with officers and committees drawn from the community. A number are discussed here, with many others now known only from book or newspaper references. Charity fundraising was central to the social scene for many years.

=== Meeting need ===
Living in a major port, Hull's Jewish community has a history of charity both to residents, and to transient and settling immigrants. The Philanthropic Society of 1848 was early among many voluntary agencies, running soup kitchens and clothing shelters, giving financial relief to indigents and travellers. In 1854 there was a collection for poor Jews in Palestine, and women were aided by the Ladies Hebrew Benevolent Society of 1861. In 1869, general subscription funds were initiated for destitute, sick, and dying immigrants, and for the resident poor in winter. In the twentieth century, other groups included Hull Jewish Blind Society and an Orphan Aid Society.

Various charities had merged into the Hull Hebrew Board of Guardians in 1880, which then had 1,646 recipients. A hundred years or so later it was renamed Hull Jewish Care, with an elders home on Anlaby Road from the 1950s until 2013. In 1909 John Symons had left £20,000 to establish a home for incurables and the poor of Hull. Charles Jacobs, and his son Lord Mayor AK Jacobs, created by bequest the Jacobs Homes for the elderly, on Askew Avenue.

=== Social ===
The Hull Hebrew Literary & Debating Society was funded in 1895 for readings and music. The Jewish Girls Club was founded in 1900, and The City Club, Wright Street was founded in 1901. The Hull Judeans of Lower Union Street, founded 1919, later part of the Maccabi Association, organised sports such as cricket, football, table-tennis and swimming, whilst for elders the Hull Jewish Friendship Club began in the mid-20th century. The Jewish (ex-serviceman's) Institute at 208 Anlaby Road, later Henry's nightclub, served numerous communal functions, as did the Parkfield Centre from 1973, later a Sikh Temple, behind the Carlton Cinema, Anlaby Road.

=== Religious ===
By the 1930s, one communal burial society (Chevra Kadisha) was run by the several synagogues, as was the Hull Board of Shechita, for the organised provision of kosher food. The synagogues are also constituted as charities. See Synagogues.

=== Political ===
The Hull B'nai B'rith men's and women's lodges and youth organisation provided links with other communities including Israel, whilst the Hull Jewish Representative Council after the Second World War managed political issues, later publishing Hull's Jewish Watchman newsletter.

Fruit-machine manufacturer Jack Lennard, founded the Hull Council for Soviet Jewry, and the Wilberforce Council for Human Rights, as well as the Hull Jewish Archive.

== Synagogues ==
=== Pre-20th century ===
A reference to a synagogue demolished in 1700, situated on the narrow Dagger Lane in the Old Town, has been discredited.

In 1780, the year of the Gordon Riots, a mob sacked a Catholic chapel on Posterngate, which was nearly opposite Dagger Lane; this was rebuilt and rented, as a "neat and convenient" synagogue for 25 to 30 worshippers. In 1809, a larger rival was founded at 7 Parade Row (later demolished for Prince's Dock), by the respected and affluent Joseph Lyon (c.1765–1812) of Blackfriargate, pawnbroker, slopman (clothier) and silversmith. Lyon funded Samuel Simon as minister (see Rabbis).

In 1825 Solomon Meyer, pawnbroker and merchant (of Hull and Sheffield), and Israel Jacobs, jeweler and goldsmith (of Hull and Scarborough), as synagogue presidents, led Posterngate and Parade Row to amalgamate into the Hull Hebrew Congregation, 7 Robinson Row (off Dagger Lane), which was consecrated 1827. Paid for by the Great London Synagogue and by mortgage, the new shul had 100 seats, and a covered passage from the narrow cobbled street. Rebuilt under the leadership of Bethel Jacobs c. 1851–1852, in Grecian-style with stained glass, it seated 200 men and 80 women in the gallery, but by 1900 it was overcrowded.

=== 20th century ===
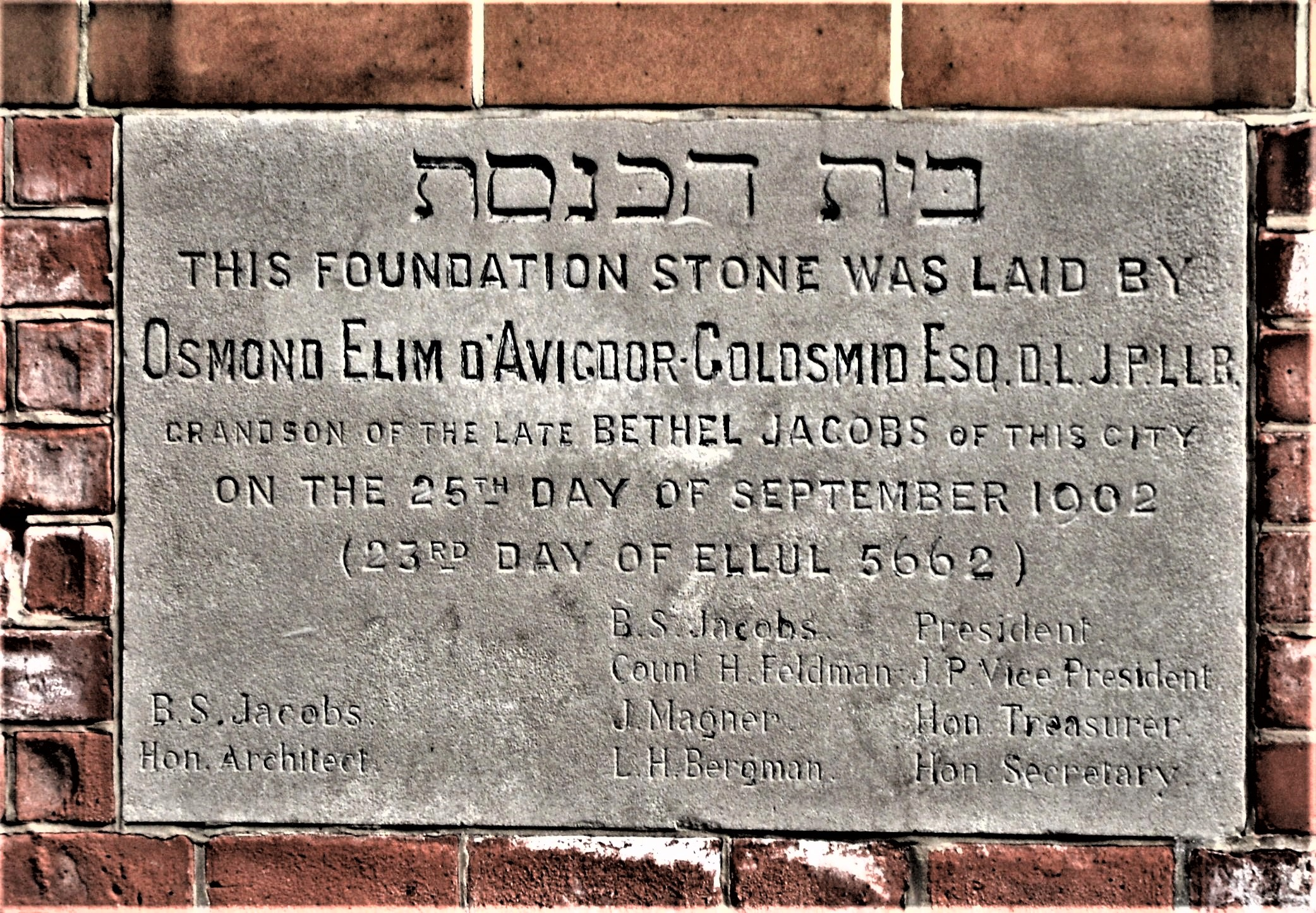
Foundation stone to Hull's Western Synagogue

Over 200 years, tensions amongst congregations came and went peacefully, except for occasional synagogue scuffles. It was conflict with newcomers that led established families in 1902 to build the Western Synagogue for over 600, on Linnaeus Street along Anlaby Road; it was new-built in Byzantine style, the architect BS Jacobs, son of Bethel. The remainder of Jews from Robinson Row relocated in 1903, as Hull Old Hebrew Congregation, to an Osborne Street new-build, which was by then the main Jewish area. With adorned entrances and later facilities, it seated 350 men, and 350 women above.

About 1870 Russian Jews gathered off School Street, in what was in 1887 consecrated as "Hull Central Hebrew Congregation," Waltham Street. Some joined Osborne Street in 1903, the rest in 1914 founded Cogan Street synagogue, refurbishing the neoclassical Salem Congregational Chapel, which had held 950. In 1928 a rabbinical dispute erupted in the press over bones in its crypt, only re-buried in 1946 after the Cogan Street shul was bombed out in 1940. The Central Congregation moved to West Parade, and in 1951 to 94 Park Street (formerly Alderman Cogan Girls' School) closing in 1976 to merge with Linnaeus Street.

The Fischoff Synagogue of Lower Union Street, opened 1928 by Lord Rothschild, closed in the 1941 Blitz. There were other short-lived shuls.

Osborne Street shul was also destroyed in the 1941 Blitz but restored after the Second World War. It was sold in 1989 and later became part of the Heaven and Hell nightclub. The congregation merged with that of Linnaeus Street, taking new premises in Pryme Street, Anlaby, which were consecrated in 1995.

=== 21st century ===
As of 2021 the active synagogues are Hull Hebrew Congregation (Ashkenazi Orthodox) – in Pryme Street Anlaby; and the Reform Ne've Shalom, which opened in 1992 at Willerby, twenty-five years after the Reform Congregation's formation. Through the efforts of community leader and historian Jack Lennard, Linnaeus Street shul is a listed building, mentioned by Pevsner, now an office.

=== Rabbis ===
Salis Daiches, who was from a Lithuanian dynasty of Rabbis, served Hull to 1907; he was later the leading Rabbi in Edinburgh, and published the recently reprinted Aspects of Judaism (1928). Rabbi Mordechai Schwartz, in Hull since 1920, published sermons, and in 1926, the anti-Darwinian Faith and Science. Schwartz was involved in a major dispute over Cogan Street synagogue. In 1931 Rabbi Samuel Brod (arrived Hull 1898, d.1938) published a book of articles on the Talmud.

Rabbi Louis Miller, father of New York's Rabbi Alan Miller, was minister of the Hull Western Synagogue and headmaster of its Hebrew School from 1920 to 1930. Eliezer Simcha Rabinowitz BA was from a rabbinical line, and as Hull's Minister in 1953, became the first communal Rabbi of Hull (1956–59), and later, of Cape Town and Manchester. Rabbi Chaim Joshua Cooper MA Ph.D. (1917–99), born in London, was renowned for his intellect as Hull's communal Jewish leader from 1960, active into the 1990s.

=== Cantors and synagogue officers ===
Samuel Simon was the earliest minister, serving from the 1820s to 1866. Simon was also a shochet (ritual slaughterer) and mohel (circumciser); he was later known as the alter rebbe (old reverend). Shul secretary and Minister Rev. Isaac Hart taught at the school around 1870. Abraham Elzas, who was educated in Holland and well-traveled, was a minister as well as master of the Hebrew school, and a mason. He also published translations of several books of the Bible.

Highly regarded ministers remembered included Revs. Harry Abrahams and Judah Levinson of Osborne Street; and Revs. Joshua Freedberg, David Hirsch, and Hyman Davies of Linnaeus Street.

As elsewhere, each synagogue had a sequence of not only ministers, but also presidents, vice-presidents, treasurers and secretaries. Some individuals and families have featured in these roles for decades – at Linnaeus Street, the Rosenstons and Conrad Segelman, and at Osborne Street Harry Shulman. Nevertheless, it was often the modest shammes (caretaker, beadle), who was the most familiar face, such as latterly at Linnaeus Street, Harry Westerman.

== Ritual baths ==
The first ritual bath for Jewish women (mikvah) outside London may have existed from 1845 in Hull; certainly in 1850 one opened on Trippett Street, superseded in 1866 by a facility on George Street, and in 1919 by one at a local nunnery altered for the purpose, in use into the 1980s. There is a mikvah at Pryme Street Synagogue, finished in 2010.

== Cemeteries ==
Hull has five known Orthodox cemeteries, and a recent Reform one, with 2,500 burials in all, discounting an unsupported claim of a mediaeval Jewish cemetery.

From c.1780, a small plot at West Dock Terrace (later "Villa Place") saw burials until the last (of Joseph Lyon) in 1812. George Alexander, community leader and synagogue president, silversmith and coin dealer, and the Levy family then opened a Hessle Road site, which was in use until 1858. It sits next to the landmark 1895 Alexandra Hotel, with Star of David overglazings marking a once-Jewish area, it holds Israel Jacobs, and Barna(r)d Barna(r)d, jeweller, watchmaker and Navy Agent (d.1821), "buried with honour".

In East Hull is the 1858 larger Delhi Street site, with the earliest graves lost to a 1941 German bomb. Expanded c. 1900 it had a pre-burial hall and served Linnaeus Street and Osborne Street shuls. In 2002 vandals damaged 110 graves and smashed another 80 in 2011. The cemetery contains five Commonwealth war graves of Jewish service personnel, one from the First World War and four from the Second World War.

In 1935 the Osborne Street congregation sought space at Marfleet Lane; buried there is synagogue secretary Phineas Hart (d. 1952 age 80), who helped destitute immigrants; it also contains a Commonwealth war grave of Signalman Benedict Korklin, who died in the Second World War.

The Central Congregation established in 1889 Ella Street Cemetery, in the Avenues area. It is now the main Orthodox cemetery, one grave is of Annie Sheinrog headmistress (d.1985 age 94, see Schools).

Since 1975, the Reform Congregation has a small site in Anlaby.

== Schools ==
In 1826 the Robinson Row shul had a makeshift school-room, and by 1852, 40 boys and girls were in a rebuilt facility there, learning Hebrew, English and arithmetic. In 1838, there was also a free school for the poor. Due to the work of Philip Bender, Rev. Isaac Hart and others, schooling for boys and girls (which was segregated by gender) developed further, in West Street by the 1870s, and separate institutions were established in Osborne Street by 1887. A girls school was started in 1863, and with infants, it took in 200 pupils in 1900; under headmistress Miss Annie Sheinrog, this long continued, through to wartime evacuation in Swanland, and closure in 1945.

From 1870 on, boys state-schooling took hold, supplemented by early morning or evening communal Hebrew School, attached to the larger synagogues. The surviving Sunday morning cheder at Linnaeus Street, for boys and girls, was supplemented around 1966 by evening classes at Kirk Ella School, and soon relocated there. Latterly it was run at the Parkfield Centre, and lastly at Pryme Street synagogue, before closing around 2010. Michael Westerman was the last headmaster.

In addition to local state-schools like Kingston High in the Boulevard, Malet Lambert and Newland High (girls), and Eastfield in Anlaby Park, favoured private schools were Hymers College (boys), and to a lesser extent, Tranby Croft (girls).

== Anti-Semitism ==
The Jews of Hull often report their home as, for example, an "historic and welcoming city," which has shown "maximum tolerance and understanding to religious minorities." Ironically, Edward I, who persecuted England's Jews up to their expulsion in 1290, granted Hull's charter as "King's Town". Anti-Semitism has a long history in England, and in Hull.

=== Religious persecution ===
In 1769, a local pamphlet claimed that the Wandering Jew of Jerusalem – a cobbler condemned for spitting in the face of Jesus – had arrived in Hull. No chains could contain him, and he never aged, as he awaited the Second Coming. Since the expulsion of Jews from England, such myths shaped how Jews were perceived, leading up to the Evangelical call for the Conversion of Jews, promoted by Hull's famed William Wilberforce. Arrivals to the port, (as elsewhere) were proffered Christianizing meetings and pamphlets in Yiddish. There was an active mission in Hull throughout the 19th century.

An 1833 petition in Hull viewed emancipation of the Jews as a threat to the Christian Sabbath. When Sir Isaac Goldsmid stood to be MP for nearby Beverley in 1847, the Hull Packet saw "a radical jew" and "an anti-christian movement". However, at that time, the editor of the Hull Advertiser, was campaigning against such religious prejudice.

Attacks on Jewish graves in Hull continue from the past, into the 21st century (see Cemeteries).

=== Economic ===
In the early years, Jews in Hull found settled work primarily with other Jews or in self-employment. In 1838, bill-poster Michael Jacobs was summarily dismissed and accused of theft by a Dr. Johnson, allegations dismissed at court. A peddler in 1841 was racially abused, assaulted and threatened with a knife over a financial dispute, although attacks on Jews in the street recurred for various motives. Later, domination of some trades and Trade Union involvement caused local resentment. Similarly, the propensity of sabbath-observant Jews to trade or wish to trade on Sundays was an issue.

In 1832, Jewish leaders in Hull were confusingly accused in print of "an offensive tax" on meat. For years local papers aired crude stereotypes, highlighting Jews as litigious money-lenders, or mocking them as comical disputants; they routinely regurgitated London "column-fillers," such as any Jew accused of dishonesty.

=== Political ===
There was popular and political support in Hull for the emancipation of Jews from their legal restrictions. Nevertheless, the first apparently Jewish Mayor of Hull, was both a target of an acerbic political lampoon, which focused on his race, countenance, demeanour, intellect and loyalties, and of more subtle taunting, about missionary conversion.

Hostility to Jews in the wake of Eastern European immigration led to the Aliens Act, with effective cessation of arrivals in 1914. First World War xenophobic riots, worst in Hull, were directed at Germans, but also fell on Jews including those in Hull. In 1915, Rev. Isaac Levine of Cogan Street synagogue was beaten as a spy, dragged to a policeman by a drunk – who was himself imprisoned for five months. Hannah Feldman, past Lady Mayoress, was also a victim. Many families anglicised their German-sounding names at this time.

In the 1930s Fascists advertised in Hull, and attacked Jewish shops; some fought back – in 1936 Oswald Mosley fled the huge first Battle of Corporation Field. Anti-Semitism was widespread, even during the Second World War, in the Hull area, then suddenly taboo after 1945 newsreels of Bergen-Belsen. Nevertheless, sympathy for Holocaust survivors, and ambivalent British support for Zionism, were not enough to contain the reaction to retaliations against British forces in Mandate Palestine. The 1947 anti-Jewish summer riots, were worst in Manchester, Liverpool and Glasgow, and in Hull windows of Hessle Road shops were broken.

Hull University has one of the minority of Student Unions that have disaffiliated from the National Union of Students, triggered by the ongoing dispute about anti-Zionism and anti-semitism on campus.

== First World War ==
=== War service ===
The touching letters of Marcus Segal, who was killed in 1917, from the trenches to his Hull-born mother, evoke life at the front.

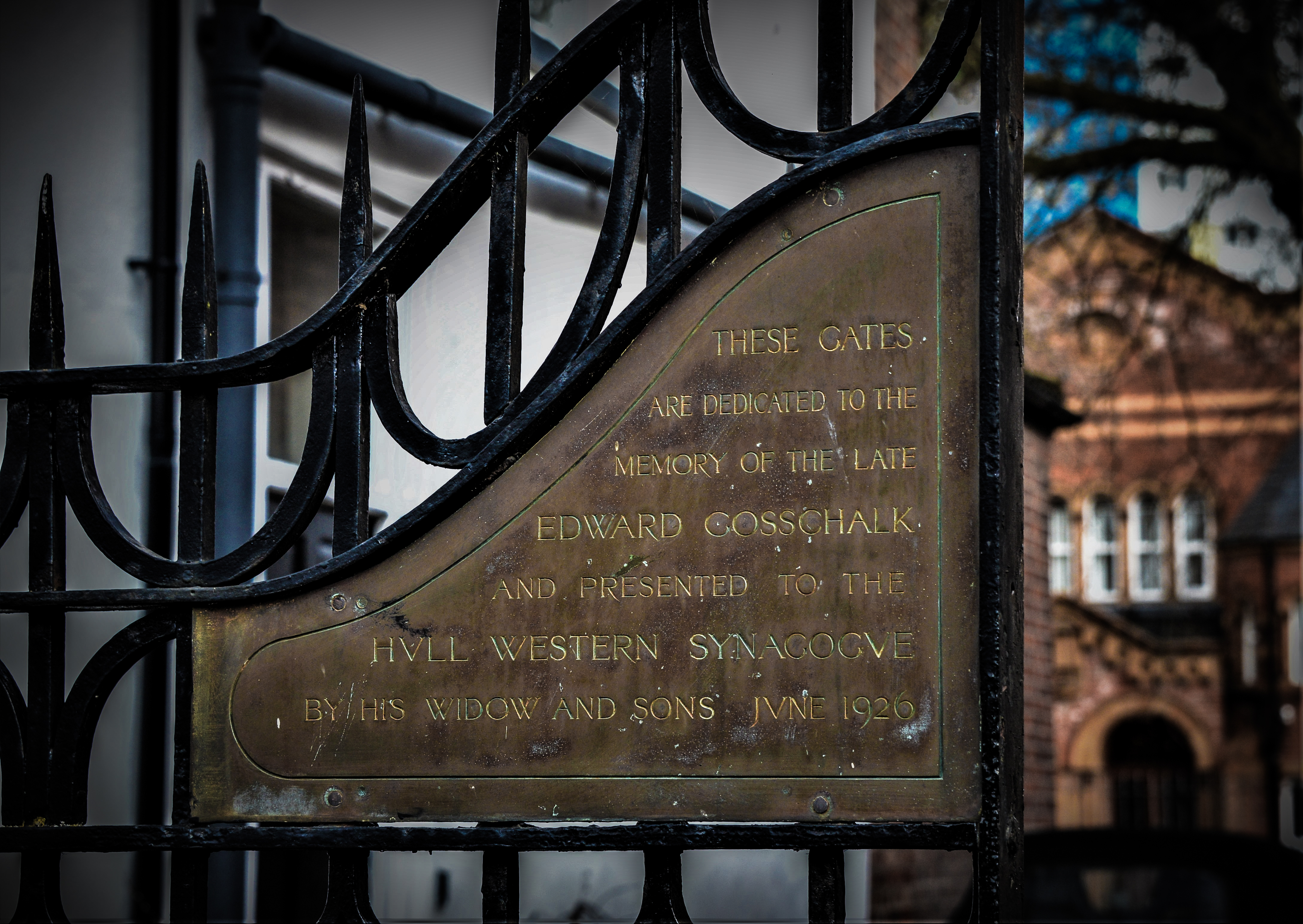
Memorial gate to Edward Gosschalk at Hull's former Western Synagogue

About 50 Hull Jewish men died for their country in the Great War; many more fought but survived. A few of the communal tragedies were the deaths of Corporal (Cpl) Harry and Private (Pte) Marcus Silverstone, who were killed weeks apart on the Somme in 1916. Pte Max Kay (Chayet) of the Royal Army Medical Corps was born in Minsk, lived on Hessle Road, and died of wounds in Mesopotamia in 1916; he was mentioned in dispatches, and is remembered on the Basra Memorial.

In January 1917, Cpl Harry Furman (aged 20) rescued his pal Pte Simon Levine (aged 21), before both died of their wounds. Later that year, Solomon Ellis (previously Moshinsky) was killed, six months before his brother Nathan. Louis Newman was killed in France in 1917, three months before his brother Charles died at Ypres. Abraham and Joseph Sultan also both died in the war. Lieutenant (Lt) Edward M. Gosschalk, (aged 33) whose father had been Sheriff of Hull, died in 1916.

Sergeant (Sgt) Jack Aarons was wounded in 1916, and received the Military Medal in 1918; he lived until 1976. Pte. Louis Shapero also received the Military Medal for conspicuous bravery in rescuing a wounded officer whilst under fire.

The first Jew to serve in the Royal Flying Corps was Wing Commander Joseph Kemper MBE; born in Hull, he was one of five Jews who served in both the RFC, and in the RAF in the Second World War.

=== Home front ===
In addition to the stress of having sons who were away at war, there was a surge of xenophobia at home (see Anti-Semitism, Political). Bombing by German Zeppelins in Hull hit Jewish traders amidst others in Churchside marketplace, and homes such as that of Harris Needler's family.

The wartime economy offered a boom in outfitting for the military, and even airplane work and naval salvage. The influenza pandemic, and a severe post-war depression eventually tipped many of the same businesses into bankruptcy.

== Second World War ==
=== Leading into war ===
Despite immigration restrictions, some of those fleeing Europe in the 1930s came to Britain, often via Hull. About 120 stayed in the area, at least for a time, including German-speaking doctors like Isserlin, Seewald. and Sprinz settled around Hull after Kristallnacht.

Local families, Jewish and Christian, initially took in 63 Kindertransport children, of whom at least 22 were brought up in Hull. Among them was Rudolf Wessely, father of psychiatrist Regius Prof. Sir Simon Wessely. Another was Fred Barshak, who had witnessed Kristallnacht in Vienna; like many he later found that his whole family had been killed. A violin prodigy, he studied law at Oxford and became a property developer; his children are comedian Aaron, and composer/film-maker Tamara.

As other British Jews, the community in Hull dreaded a Nazi invasion, with good cause. The truth about the genocide later called the Holocaust was no secret; and, it turned out, German plans to round up and kill people in Britain had been drawn up. Professor Theodor Plaut, at Hull University 1933–1936, was one of the listed Jewish targets.

=== The Hull Blitz ===
In 1940 spirits were high, with fundraising for the forces. Yet, as a major East Coast port the city had a special reason to fear not only invasion, but the bombing that came before. Hull was the British city that was proportionality most heavily bombed. A map of bomb sites shows where areas were hit by the Luftwaffe, with some Hull Jewish fatalities: auxiliary fireman Alexander Schooler, air-raid warden Abraham Levy, fire-watcher Louis Black, Mark Goltman on Beverley Road, and others in raids in Manchester, and Coventry.

Three synagogues were damaged, two badly (see Synagogues), amid a City Centre "moonscape of bombsites, craters and broken buildings". The old housing and shops around Osborne Street and along Anlaby and Hessle Roads were later subject to slum clearance; of the streets that completely disappeared, some had been Jewish strongholds – Lower Union Street, Paradise Place, Day Street; in this district, truly, "little, if any of old Hull is still standing."

Perhaps half the population of Hull was homeless or evacuated at some point, with Jewish children being sent away, many to non-Jewish homes, around East Yorkshire and beyond. Hull and Birmingham were sites of Government "operational research" into children and the civilian impact of bombing, led by Lord (Solly) Zuckerman and J. D. Bernal. The shock of the Blitz, the newsreels from Belsen, and the jubilation of VE Day, were followed by events in British Mandate Palestine (see Anti-Semitism).

=== War service ===
There were at least 18 Hull Jewish service fatalities, and many more decorated survivors, in the Second World War.

Captain (Capt) Isidore Newman MBE CdG MdeR (1916–44), in 1938 a teacher at Middleton Street Boys, was a radio operator for SOE; betrayed on his second mission in occupied France, he was murdered by SS at Mauthausen, Austria 1944.

Major (Maj) Wilfred "Billy" Sugarman MC (1918–76, son of Israel Sugarman, a tailor), was part of the first wave of troops ashore on D-Day at Normandy, and he sustained multiple grenade wounds but led men onward. He went on to see more action in Egypt and Burma, and after the war ended, he was a Hull headmaster. His younger brother Harold was, by a family account, a cyanide pill-carrying decoder and operative in Italy/Austria, who was pressed to stay on past 1946 as a ski-instructor.

Of the six Rossy Brothers (see Businesses), anti-aircraft Gunner Cyril Rosenthall and mechanic Aircraftsman Ronnie were both killed in 1941, whilst Ernie returned from Dunkirk and Burma. Morris Miller had died fighting in the Spanish Civil War in 1938, before his brother Lance-Corporal (LCpl) Alfred Miller, who fell with the Royal Artillery in 1940.

Others who died were Flying Officers Harold Rathbone, and Bernard Tallerman; Lt David Queskey; Flight Sergeants Calman Bentley, Gerald Cobden, and Harold Harris, "table tennis champion of Hull"; Sgt William Hare; CQMS David Juggler; Lance Sjt. Cyril Bass; Cpl Mark Moses; Pte Harry Garfunkle, Signalman Benedict Korklin; and Bdr Fred Rapstone.

Czech-born doctor Friedrick Schulz escaped a concentration camp, and joined the RAMC, but in 1949, at the age of 29, committed suicide, which was the same day his father was murdered in Mauthausen. Friedrick is buried in Hull Northern Cemetery.

Leslie Kersh spent three-and-a-half years in a Japanese POW camp.

Hull's Cpl Bernard Levy was amongst the first to see Bergen-Belsen. He did not speak of his experiences for 70 years. From the Hull Northern clothing family, he founded and ran the High and Mighty outsize menswear UK and international retail chain; he died in 2022 age 96.

The Hull Association of Jewish Ex-Serviceman and Women continued to march annually in Whitehall into the 21st century. After 1945 Jews played their part in the rejuvenation of the city (see Businesses.

Ewen Montagu, Jewish aristocrat and judge, was assistant staff officer in intelligence at Hull's Royal Naval East Yorkshire HQ, before as a naval espionage chief in London he led Operation Mincemeat, deceiving Hitler about the imminent invasion of Sicily.

== Businesses ==
=== Jewellers, merchants, and shipbuilders ===
Leading Jewish families in Hull at one time were mostly retailers, and some craftsmen, of precious wares and branded timepieces. Still-noted Victorian clockmakers are Bethel Jacobs and Isaac Lavine, also Bush, Carlin, Friedman, Lewis, Maizels, Marks, Shibko, Solomon, Symons and Wacholder. There were once many other jewelers (see Early history), later only a few like watchmaker PS Phillips, Chappells (became Conleys / Paragon), and Segals, which survives (est. 1919). Synagogue president Louis Rapstone sold antiques in the town, as did TV personality David Hakeney.

Mid-century trading businesses, like Lewis & Godfrey's fancy bazaar of the 1850s, Magner Bros' fancy goods dealers & importers, and Haberland & Glassman's 1867 grocers, became major merchant firms toward 1900. Dumoulin & Gosschalk of Finkle Street were classic "Port Jews," who were hide, wool and produce importers. Victor Dumoulin (Flemish b.Lille 1836) became Hull's Imperial Ottoman Vice-Consul, later consul for the Austrian Empire, and chairman of the Chamber of Commerce. Major Jewish egg importers included Max Minden & Co, and Fischoff; as well as Saville Goldrein, Annis & Gordon, and Cecil Krotowski. Among grain importers was the Hull warehouse of the international Louis Dreyfus & Co.

Martin Samuelson was born in Hamburg to a Jewish merchant family, which converted to Christianity, probably in Hull. An iron-shipbuilding engineer, he was Sheriff and Mayor of Hull). The spit of land which his major shipyard occupied is still called Sammy's Point, where Hull's The Deep aquarium now stands. His brother, engineer Alexander, worked with Martin in Hull, and another brother, schooled in Hull, was industrialist Sir Bernhard Samuelson.

=== Tailors and other trades ===
Solomon Cohen (see Early history) was a successful pioneer of ready-made clothing in Hull. Tailors, mostly from Eastern Europe, were the leading trade by 1900: Rosenston, Sadolfsky, Shalgoskie, Goldbard, Leshinsky, Kaplan, Rosenthal, Weinstein etc.; later (AK) Jacobs, and Lipman & Silver. Many young women worked as seamstresses or tailor's finishers. After the depressions of 1920–1, 1929–33, and the Second World War, some clothiers survived – Levy's Northern, Gersteins, Premier Menswear, Regal Tailors (Schultz), and more.

Linked to Hull's prominence in importing and processing Baltic timber, second to tailors in number were many small wood-workers and cabinet-makers, like Abraham Gutenberg of Osborne Street. Similar work-shops spawned Lebus, Paradies & Co sawmill, Marks & Sugarman steam cabinet works (furniture, First War 'planes), Zimmerman furniture stores, East Riding Furniture Co, and Arlington (Abrahams) bar/kitchen fitters. Another major trade (using imported leather and wood) was clog-, slipper- and boot-making: Rosen's slipper- and shoe-factory was a big employer; John Harris and Furmans shoe-shops were well known.

Visible across the town in the post-war years were chains like Zerny's dry-cleaners, est.1892, and Goodfellows supermarkets (Oppel). Jewish tobacconists included several Vinegrads sweet shops, the family also ran pre-war wholesalers, and later radio shops. Now-lost kosher bakers and butchers, delicatessens and fish-shops of old Osborne Street are often fondly remembered, especially Freedman the baker, and fish-fryers Levine's, and Barnett's. Similarly recalled are many city names: Reuben barbers, and Rossy Bros bookmakers (see Second World War – war service); Segal's, Shenker's, and Sultan's curtains, furriers Blooms, Blank, and Silver, Goldstones wallpaper and paint, Bennetts glass, Couplands carpets, and Myers wholesalers. AK Jacobs had garages pre-war, whilst Car Marks number-plates came later. Actress Mira Johnson's gown shop House of Mirelle is still celebrated.

== Notable people ==
- Moses Abrahams, mayor of Grimsby, born in Hull.
- Pat Albeck, textile designer and "Queen of the Tea Towels",
- John Bentley, bass guitarist for Squeeze
- Marcus Bibbero, swimming pioneer
- Jacob Bronowski, known for the The Ascent of Man, taught University College Hull, lived in Cottingham,
- Ellis A. Davidson, writer and teacher
- Lionel Davidson, novelist, writer at The Spectator
- Joseph Duveen, 1st Baron Duveen, international art dealer
- Israel Finestein QC, Judge, President of the Board of Deputies of British Jews, historian of Hull's Jewish community
- Sydney Goldstein, FRS, mathematician in fluid dynamics
- Mark Goulden, born Bristol, Hull newspaper editor
- Louis Harris MBE, Hull KR rugby league player and coach
- Bethel Jacobs, inventor, polymath, and philanthropist
- Charles M. Jacobs, English civil engineer
- Malcolm Levitt FRS, nuclear magnetic resonance pioneer
- Dame Maureen Lipman, actress
- Edith Noble (born Davidson, Hull 1910), President of the League of Jewish Women, Life President of The Alliance of Jewish Women (AJWO), Vice President of the International Council of Jewish Women.
- Benno Pearlman, solicitor, Sheriff and Lord Mayor of Hull.
- Sir Bernhard Samuelson PC FRS, industrialist, educationalist and politician
- Leo Schultz, Hull politician and Lord Mayor
- Martin Schultz, cricketer for Hull CC in the 1970s, for Great Britain in 1981 and 1985 Maccabiah Games,
- Valerie Strachan, Chair HM customs and Excise
