= John Hughes (businessman) =

Welsh businessman (1814–1889)

John James Hughes
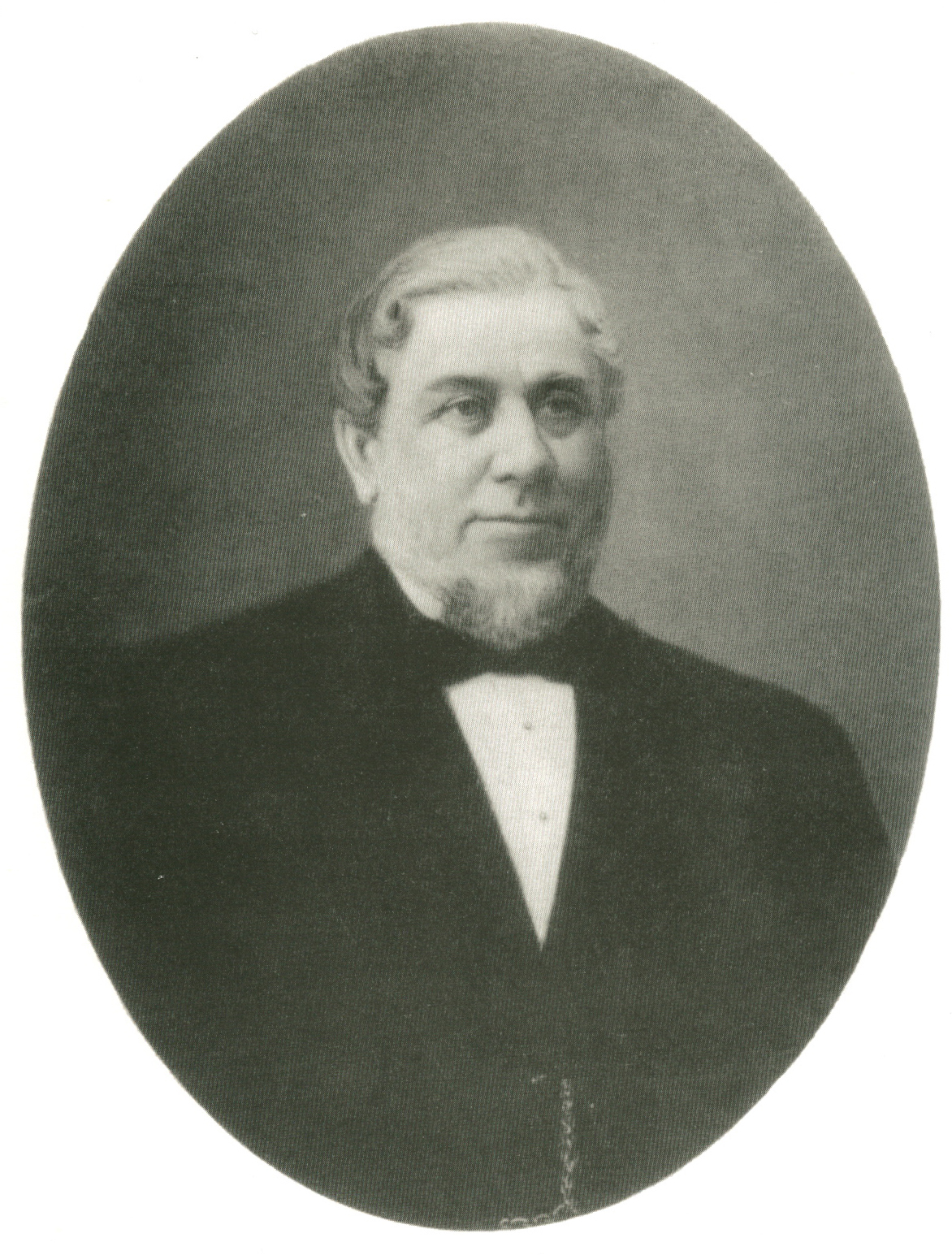
- Born: 1814; Merthyr Tydfil, Glamorgan, Wales
- Died: 17 June 1889 (aged 74–75); Saint Petersburg, Russian Empire
- Resting place: West Norwood Cemetery
- Known for: Founder of the city of Donetsk
- Scientific career
- Fields: Engineer, businessman

John James Hughes (1814 – 17 June 1889) was a Welsh engineer, businessman and founder of the city of Donetsk. The village was originally named Yuzovka (Hughesovka, Russian: Юзoвка) or Yuzivka (Ukrainian: Юзівка) after Hughes ("Yuz" being a Russian and Ukrainian approximation of Hughes), formally becoming a town in May 1917 and in 1924 being renamed to Stalino (Ukrainian: Сталіно). In 1961, the name was changed to Donetsk.

== Biography ==
Hughes was born in Merthyr Tydfil, Wales, where his father was head engineer at the Cyfarthfa Ironworks. It was there that Hughes started his career, under his father's supervision.

He then moved to Ebbw Vale, before joining the Uskside Foundry in Newport, Monmouthshire, in the 1840s. It was here that Hughes made his reputation and fortune, patenting a number of inventions in armaments and armour plating. The resultant revenues allowed him to acquire a shipyard aged 28, and by the age of 36 he owned a foundry in Newport. It was also during this time that he married Elizabeth Lewis, and had eight children: six boys and two girls, all born in Newport.

=== Millwall Iron Works ===
In the mid-1850s, Hughes moved to London to become manager of C.J. Mare and Company's forges and rolling mills, which was then taken over by the Millwall Iron Works & Shipbuilding Company, part of the Millwall Iron Works, Shipbuilding and Graving Docks Company. Hughes was a director of the company when it foundered, and resultantly became manager of the residual Millwall Iron Works Company. During this period, the various companies and successors won worldwide acclaim for the iron cladding of wooden warships for the British Admiralty, for which Hughes was given much of the credit. In 1864 he designed a gun carriage for heavy cannons, which came to be used by the Royal Navy, as well as the navies of some other European countries.

=== Foundation of Donetsk ===
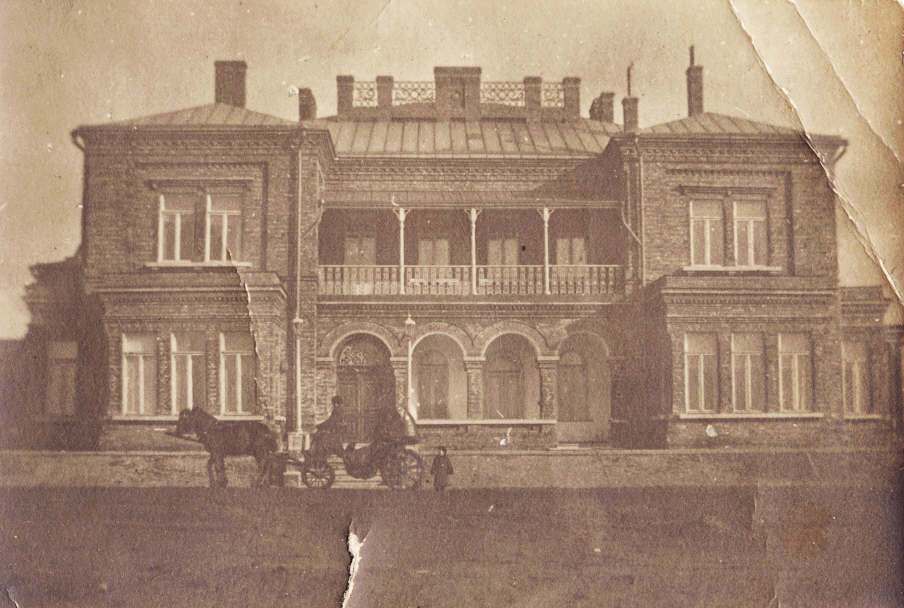
Hughes' home in Hughesovka, c. 1900

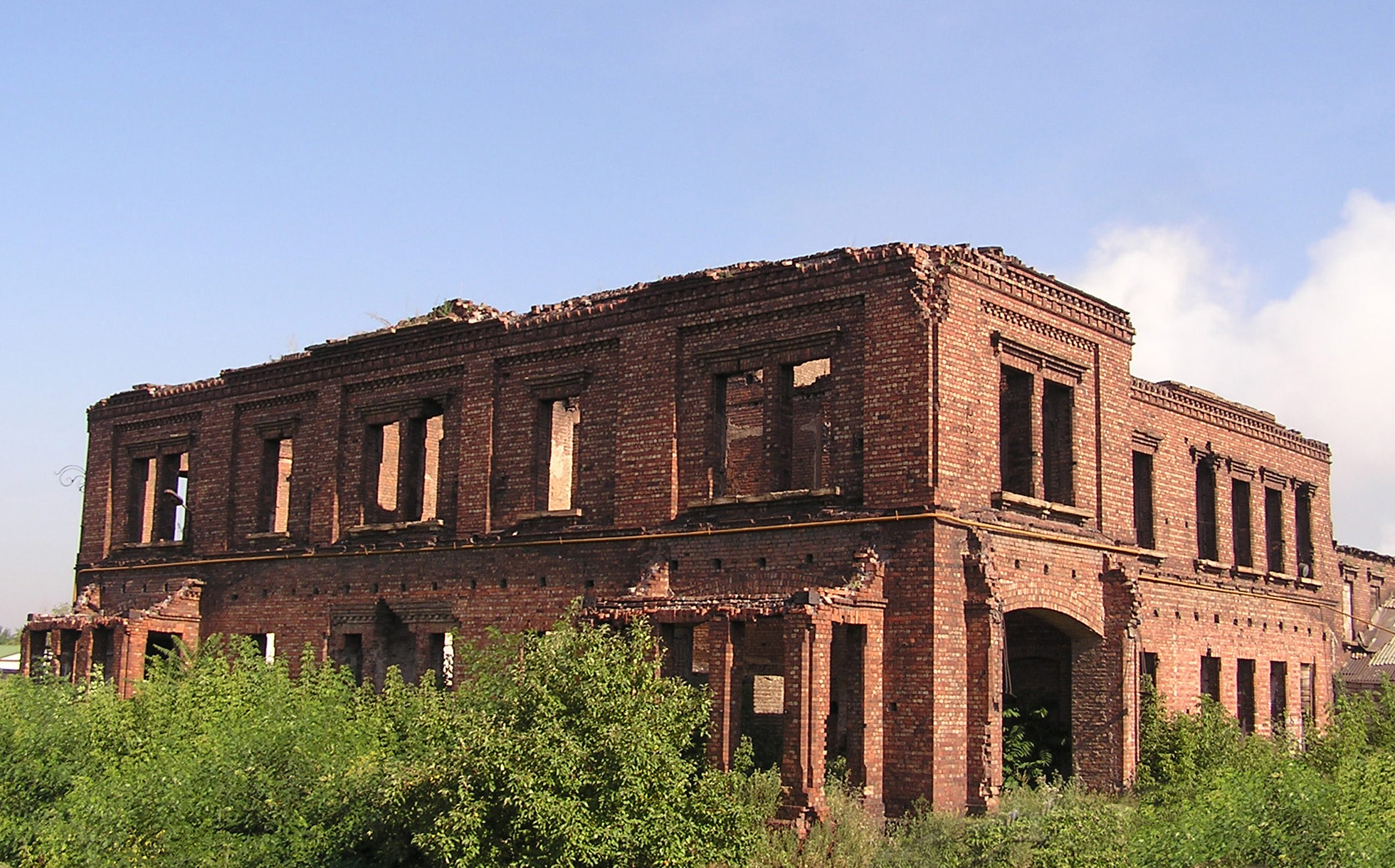
Same house in Donetsk, 2006

In 1868, the Millwall Iron Works Company received an order from the Imperial Russian Government for the plating of a naval fortress being built at Kronstadt on the Baltic Sea. Hughes accepted a concession from the Imperial Russian Government to develop metal works in the region, and in 1869 acquired a piece of land to the north of the Azov Sea from Russian statesman Sergei Kochubey (son of Viktor Kochubey).

He formed the 'New Russia Company Ltd.' to raise capital, and in the summer of 1870, at the age of 55, he moved to Russia. He sailed with eight ships, with not only all the equipment necessary to establish a metal works, but also much of the skilled labour; a group of about a hundred ironworkers and miners mostly from South Wales.

He immediately started to build metal works close to the river Kalmius, at a site near the village of Alexandrovka. The state-of-the-art works had eight blast furnaces and was capable of a full production cycle, with the first pig iron cast in 1872. During the 1870s, collieries and iron ore mines were sunk, and brickworks and other facilities were established to make the isolated works a self-sufficient industrial complex. He further built a railway line-producing factory. All of Hughes' facilities were held under the 'Novorussian society for coal, iron and rails production.'

The Hughes factory gave its name to the settlement which grew in its shadow, and the town of Hughesovka (Yuzovka) grew rapidly. Hughes personally provided a hospital, schools, bath houses, tea rooms, a fire brigade and an Anglican church dedicated to the patron saints St George and St David. The land around the metalworks quickly grew to become an industrial and cultural centre in the region; the population of the city founded by Hughes now exceeds one million.

Over the next twenty years, the works prospered and expanded, first under John Hughes and then, after his death in 1889, under the management of four of his sons.

=== Death and burial ===
Hughes died on 17 June 1889 during a business trip to Saint Petersburg. His body was repatriated to the UK for burial beside his wife at West Norwood Cemetery in London. Several of his sons are also buried there.

=== Post Hughes ===
By the end of the nineteenth century, the works was the largest in the Russian Empire, producing 74% of Russian iron in 1913. A period of relative decline in the early years of the twentieth century was followed by expansion during World War I. Many of the men who accompanied John Hughes settled in Hughesovka and brought their wives and families. Over the years, although a Russian workforce was trained by the company, skilled workers from the United Kingdom continued to be employed, and many technical, engineering and managerial positions were filled by British immigrants; who were overwhelmingly Welsh. A thriving expatriate community was established, living in good quality company housing, and provided with an English school and an Anglican church. Despite the cold winters, hot summers and occasional cholera epidemics, some families remained in Hughesovka for many years.

The Bolshevik revolution of 1917 ended the Hughes family's connection to the works. The Hughes brothers and almost all their foreign employees returned to Britain or other countries. The works were nationalised by the Bolsheviks in 1919. The town of Hughesovka was renamed "Stalino" in 1924, and then the present name "Donetsk" in 1961. The works survived and prospered despite regime and socio-economic change, and Donetsk remains a major metallurgical industries centre today.

A monument to Hughes by sculptor Oleksandr Skorykh was erected in Donetsk in 2001.

In March 2014, following the annexation of Crimea by the Russian Federation, a humorous campaign advocated that Donetsk join the United Kingdom because of the city's connection to Hughes. Shortly afterwards, the Ukrainian government lost control of Donetsk to militants of the self-declared Donetsk People's Republic, who declared the city to be independent of Ukraine and advocated integration with Russia.

In 2014, an instrumental song on the Welsh band Manic Street Preachers' album Futurology paid homage to John Hughes, referring to Donetsk by its former name.

In 2017 there was an event in Merthyr with contemporary archival film as well as new music and photographs about the historic connections of migration between Merthyr and Hughesovka.

== Publications ==
- 'Hughesovka, A Welsh Enterprise in Imperial Russia', Susan Edwards, Glamorgan Record Office (1992) ISBN 0905243277.
- 'Dreaming a City: From Wales to Ukraine', Colin Thomas, Y Lolfa 2009 ISBN 9781847711243. Includes the author's 1991 BBC documentary "Hughesovka and the New Russia", winner of BAFTA Cymru's inaugural Best Documentary Award.
- 'The Iron Tsar, the Life and Times of John Hughes', Roderick Heather, Penpress 2010 ISBN 1907499172

== See also ==
- Donetsk Metallurgical Plant
