= Charles M. Jacobs =

English civil engineer (1850–1919)

Charles Mattathias Jacobs
- Born: June 8, 1850; Hull, England
- Died: September 7, 1919 (aged 69); Laugharne, Wales
- Spouse: Frances Helen Maria Fry (m. 1876)
- Father: Bethel Jacobs
- Engineering career
- Practice name: Jacobs & Barringer; Jacobs & Davies
- Projects: Uptown Hudson Tubes; Downtown Hudson Tubes; North River Tunnels
- Awards: Telford Medal (1910)

Charles Mattathias Jacobs (June 8, 1850 – September 7, 1919) was an English civil engineer. He is primarily known for his tunneling work in the United States, including the design of three pairs of rail tunnels under the Hudson River between New York City and New Jersey—the Uptown Hudson Tubes, the Downtown Hudson Tubes and the North River Tunnels.

== Early life ==
Charles Mattathias Jacobs was born in Hull, England on June 8, 1850. He was the ninth of fourteen children born to Esther Jacobs. His father, Bethel Jacobs, was a prominent merchant in Hull. Charles was privately educated and studied engineering at Cambridge University.

== Career ==
In 1866, Jacobs began a five-year apprenticeship in Hull with the marine engineering and shipbuilding firm of Charles and William Earle. He later served in the Merchant Service and went to sea, earning a first-class certificate as a marine engineer from the British Board of Trade. In 1876, Jacobs began working as a consulting engineer in Cardiff, Wales, specializing in marine engineering including the construction of dry docks and other types of underwater construction work. That same year, he became a member of the Institution of Mechanical Engineers.

He erected the Arvon Patent Fuel Works and the Uskside Rivet Works, both of which were located in Newport, Wales. (Note: Jacobs would serve as the director of the Uskside Rivet Works until his death.) During this time, he became an expert in the manufacture of coal briquettes from coal dust. While in Cardiff, Jacobs also served as a surveyor for Lloyd's Register of Shipping. Jacobs became a member of the Institution of Civil Engineers in 1885. He moved to London two years later, where he formed a consulting engineering partnership with Herbert Barringer. (Note: The firm was named Jacobs & Barringer; Jacobs remained in partnership with Barringer until his death.)

In 1888, Jacobs met American banking and railroad entrepreneur Austin Corbin, who visited London and was interested in using culm produced in the coal fields of the Philadelphia and Reading Coal and Iron Company (Corbin also served as the president of the Long Island Rail Road [LIRR] and Philadelphia & Reading Railroad). Jacobs came to the United States the following year to serve as a consulting engineer to Corbin. Working with Samuel Rea, Jacobs laid out plans for an underground rapid transit system connecting Lower Manhattan in New York City with the LIRR's terminal in Brooklyn and the Pennsylvania Railroad's terminal in Jersey City. The system was planned to be about four miles (6.4 km) in length, including four underground stations and one surface station. Although numerous borings were taken for the proposed project, approvals were never obtained from the Board of Rapid Transit Commissioners.

Jacobs also worked on several other plans to improve the LIRR's connections. He investigated a tunnel under Long Island Sound to connect the LIRR to the Housatonic Railroad to provide a new route to Boston and the development of Fort Pond Bay in Montauk as a trans-Atlantic port for steamships. After Corbin acquired a franchise to build a bridge across the East River from Thomas Rainey, Jacobs worked on plans to extend the LIRR westward from Queens across a bridge from Ravenswood to a terminal at East 64th Street in Manhattan. The overall length of the bridge was to have been about 11,000 feet (3,400 m), including approaches. Foundations for three of the bridge's piers were built, but the project was stopped after Corbin died in an accident in 1896.

Jacobs opened up a consulting engineering office in New York City in 1891, with John Vipond Davies serving as his chief assistant. (Note: Jacobs later entered into a partnership with Davies; the firm operated as Jacobs & Davies until 1916 when Jacobs stopped working in the United States.) Jacobs and Davies both worked on the design and construction of the Ravenswood Tunnel for the East River Gas Company under the East River between Ravenswood and Manhattan. Completed in 1894, it was the first subaqueous tunnel to be completed in New York City.

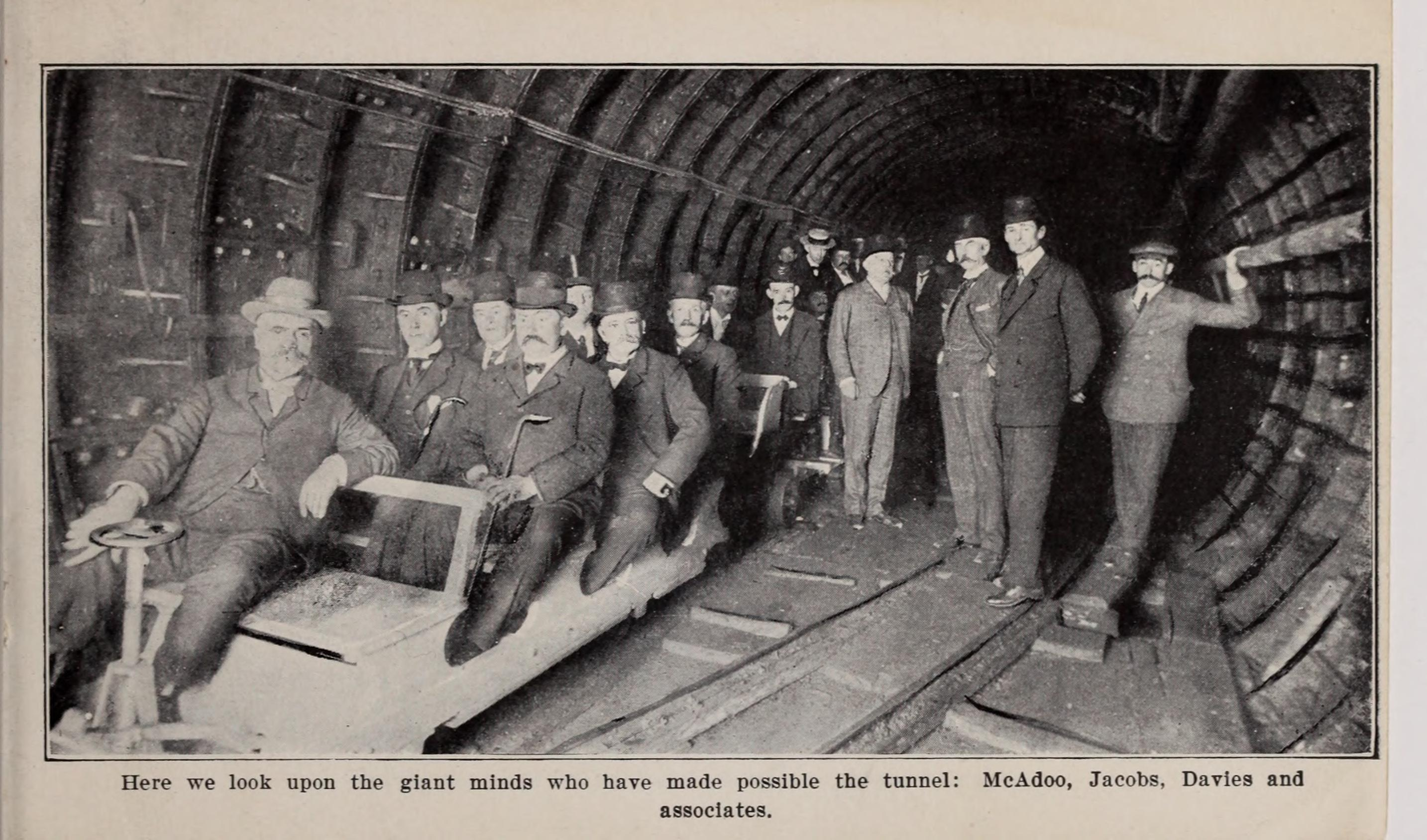
Jacobs pictured along with Davies, William McAdoo and others in the first party to go through the Uptown Hudson Tubes.

Following the successful completion of the Ravenswood Tunnel, Jacobs earned the reputation as one of the leading designers of shield-driven tunnels. He was selected as the chief engineer to complete the Uptown Hudson Tubes, which were holed through in 1904 and were the first tunnels completed under the Hudson River. That same year, Jacobs was elected as a member of the American Society of Civil Engineers. He also served as the chief engineer of the Downtown Hudson Tubes. Jacobs wrote a paper describing this overall system of rapid transit tunnels for the Hudson & Manhattan Railroad, for which he was awarded the Telford Medal by the Institution of Civil Engineers in 1910.

Jacobs subsequently served as the chief engineer of the North River Tunnels, a component of the New York Tunnel Extension, which consisted of tunnels below Bergen Hill and the Hudson River and provided trains from the Pennsylvania Railroad direct access to Manhattan with the opening of Pennsylvania Station in 1910. To support the heavier weight of trains in the tunnel on the silt below the riverbed, he designed and patented a "subterranean tunnel bridge" in which the iron tubes were supported on piers sunk into bedrock. (Note: Subsequent tests conducted during the tunnel's construction determined that the support system was not needed, but it provided assurance that the scheme would work to those planning the project.)

Jacobs was also involved in the construction of the Tredegar Dry Dock in Newport, Wales, about 300 miles (480 km) of pipeline between Rangoon and Yenangyat for the Burmah Oil Company, the Hales Bar Lock and Dam in Tennessee, and about 20 miles (32 km) of tunnels associated with the Laxaxalpam Aqueduct in Puebla, Mexico for the Mexican Light and Power Company. After residing in the United States from 1889 to 1909, he returned to England to direct the construction of a rail tunnel for the Southwest Line under the Seine to connect Rouen with Le Havre, which he had previously designed for the French government.

== Personal life ==
Jacobs married Frances Helen Maria Fry on June 1, 1876 in Penarth, Wales. The couple did not have any children.

Jacobs had an interest in motor vehicles; he owned a steam wagon and was a member of the Royal Automobile Club. He also was a member of the City of London Club and the Royal Societies Club. In New York City, he was a member of the Engineers' Club and the Railroads Club.

After retirement, Jacobs resided in Wimbledon Park outside of London. He died in Laugharne, Wales on September 7, 1919, only a few days after moving into a new summer house that he recently had purchased. His funeral and burial took place in Penarth.

In his will, Jacobs left a sum of £25,000 (equivalent to £966,090 in 2025) to establish almshouses in or near the city of Hull following the death of his wife. The houses were constructed off Askew Avenue near Pickering Park in the 1930s. The original homes were replaced in 2013 by Pickering and Ferens Homes; the property is now named "The Jacobs Homes".

== Publications ==
- Jacobs, Charles M. (1894). A General Report Upon the Initiation and Construction of the Tunnel Under The East River, New York, to the President and Directors of the East River Gas Company.
- Jacobs, Charles M. (1910). The Hudson River Tunnels of the Hudson and Manhattan Railroad Company. Institution of Civil Engineers.
- Jacobs, Charles M. (September 1910). "The New York Tunnel Extension of the Pennsylvania Railroad,: The North River Division, Paper No. 1151". Transactions of the American Society of Civil Engineers. LXVIII.
