= Bethel Jacobs =

Victorian clock-maker, inventor and philanthropist of Hull, England (1812–1869)

- Born: 1812; Kingston upon Hull
- Died: 1869 (aged 56–57)
- Spouse: Esther Lyon (m. 1836)
- Children: 14, including Charles M.

Bethel Jacobs (1812–1869) was born in Kingston upon Hull, East Riding of Yorkshire, England, becoming a prominent member of Hull's Jewish community, and highly regarded in the Town's civic circles. A successful silversmith and polymath who lived in a large house on George Street, he was son of jeweller and synagogue president Israel Jacobs, and son-in-law to Joseph Lyon, president of the rival synagogue. He married Esther Lyon in 1836, by whom he had 14 children. He died of liver disease in 1869 age 57, and was given a major public funeral. Amongst many talented descendents, his son Charles M. Jacobs constructed under-river tunnels in New York and Paris.

== Activities ==
After studying in Leipzig, he returned to his father's town centre business, overseeing the silversmith and clockmaking workshop. A capable inventor, musician, dramatist and speaker, he was soon well known for his silverware and shop in Whitefriargate, for taking on public roles such as Governor of the Poor, and for giving wide-ranging lectures. Jacobs became Master of the Humber masonic Lodge and a Town Councillor, as well an influential synagogue president.

President of Hull Literary & Philosophical Society, and the Mechanics' Institute, Jacobs led Hull's contribution to the 1851 Great Exhibition. Drawing the 1853 Association for the Advancement of Science to Hull, and after Victoria and Albert stayed at the (later Royal) Station Hotel in 1854, he was made Jeweller and Silversmith to Her Majesty that year.

A founder of the Hull Archers and later Lieutenant and Paymaster of Hull Volunteer Rifle Corps, and president of Hull's Royal Institution, Jacobs established Hull of School Art in 1861. In 1863 he erected in front of his shop the first of Hull's electric time balls; it was connected to Greenwich, and fell at noon, visible to shipping.

Several of Jacobs' clocks are housed in museums.
