= Hull Reform Synagogue =

- Ne've Shalom
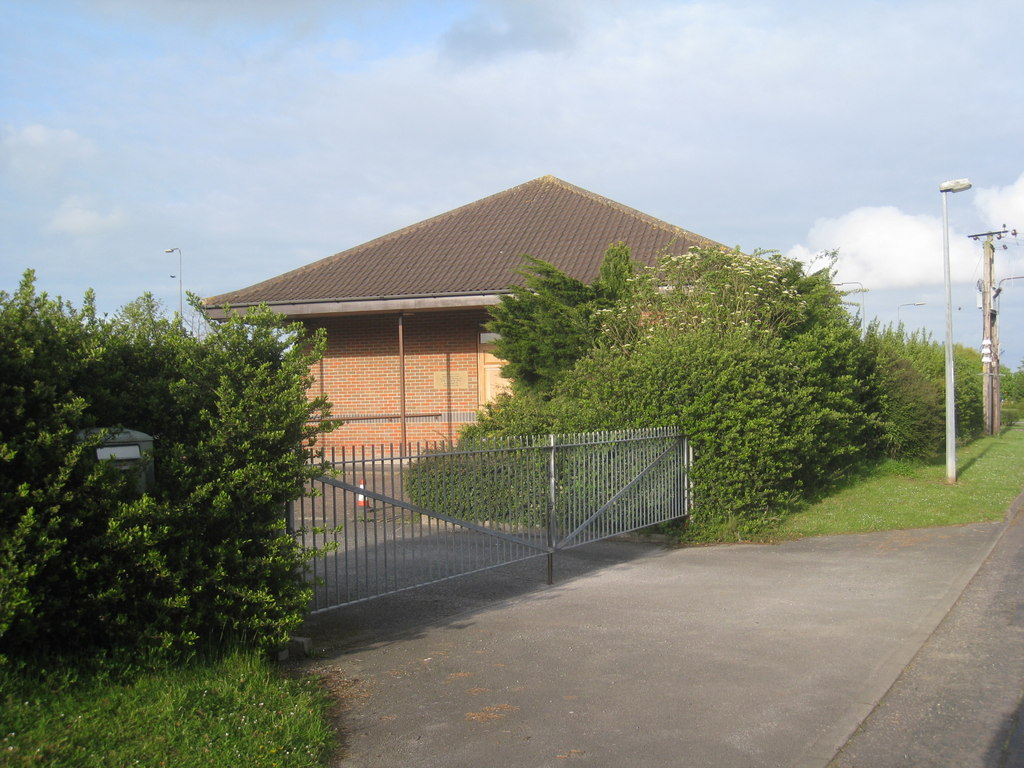
- The synagogue in 2012

- Location of the synagogue in East Yorkshire

Religion
- Affiliation: Reform Judaism
- Ecclesiastical or organizational status: Synagogue
- Status: Active

Location
- Location: Great Gutter Lane, Willerby near Kingston upon Hull, East Riding of Yorkshire, England HU10 7JT
- Country: United Kingdom
- Interactive map of Hull Reform Synagogue
- Coordinates: 53°45′44″N 0°27′24″W

Architecture
- Type: Synagogue architecture
- Established: 1966 (as a congregation)
- Completed: 1992; 34 years ago

Website
- Official website

The Hull Reform Synagogue, also known as Ne've Shalom, is a Reform Jewish community and synagogue, based in Willerby near Kingston upon Hull in the East Riding of Yorkshire, England, in the United Kingdom.

The congregation was founded in 1966 and is a member of the Movement for Reform Judaism. Services were held in people's homes, at the civic hall in Cottingham and in a Methodist hall. A foundation stone for a new synagogue was laid in November 1991, and the first service at Hull Reform Synagogue was held in February 1992.

== See also ==
- History of the Jews in Hull
- List of Jewish communities in the United Kingdom
- List of synagogues in the United Kingdom
