= History of the Jews of Grimsby =

== Overview ==
A Jewish presence in Grimsby (in Lincolnshire, England) was first reported around 1182, and further mentioned during the 13th century, often in connection with the Jews of Lincoln; however in 1290 Edward I expelled the Jews from England.

In the 1840's Victor Abrahams, born 1810 in Prussia, settled as a jeweller, later his son became mayor. After the opening of a deep water dock in 1852, continental migrants came into Grimsby for its railway terminus, eventually including by 1914 hundreds of thousands of East-European Jews, mostly bound for Liverpool en route to America; other settled in (e.g.) Leeds and Manchester, with Grimsby the third port of entry for Jews, after London and Hull. They originated especially from Poland and Greater Lithuania, and after 1860 some stayed, with Jews reported resident in Grimsby numbering 87 in 1871, 450 in 1914, but dwindling to 45 by 2021. Initially living close to the port, they later moved out along Cleethorpes Road and Hainton Avenue into suburbia. As well as traditional Jewish craft trades and retail businesses, like tailoring, cabinet-making, and jewelry, glaziery was prominent. The growth and decline of the Grimsby community parallels others in England's North Sea ports, especially Hull, its larger sister community directly across the Humber estuary.

== Institutions ==
Grimsby's first Jewish congregation dates from 1865, with the new-built Sir Moses Montefiore Synagogue opening in 1888, later expanded with a school and ritual bath-house behind; the synagogue has been a Grade II listed building since 1999. The financier and philanthropist Montefiore (resident in Ramsgate) died aged 100 a week after the foundation stone-laying in 1885.

Grimsby's Old Jewish Cemetery, in Doughty Road, dates from 1854, closing around 1920. Most burials were in other towns until the First Avenue Jewish Cemetery opened in 1896, around which time a burial society was formed. Among the approximately 500 First Avenue graves are several of those who died at sea on the journey from Europe. It holds two Commonwealth War Graves, both airmen killed in World War Two, commemorated on a plaque at the Montefiore Synagogue (above), as are six Jewish servicemen from Grimsby who died in service among the 43 men who fought during World War One.

A young men's association was formed in 1895, a charity for the poor formed in 1900, and young refugees from Nazi Germany were taken in c. 1939.

== Notable people ==
Amongst many ministers of religion, Rev. M Warshawsky served the congregation 1916-56, with the last lay reader being Harry Goodman. The community produced five Mayors of Grimsby and a Mayor of Cleethorpes, as well as Aldermen, Town Councillors, and Justices of the Peace.

- Jonathan Arkush, former President of the Board of Deputies of British Jews
- Alf Bowers (1920-2017) born in London, involved in Battle of Cable Street, decorated naval officer in WW2 Arctic Convoys and D-Day landings, later President, Grimsby Chamber of Commerce.
- John Bowers KC (b. Grimsby 1956) human and employment rights lawyer and author.
- Raoul Feld (1930-2020) Vienna-born Kindertransport child, left Germany in 1939, chemist who developed worldwide use of titanium oxide in white paint.
- Louis Furman (1908-83) owned shoe-shops in Grimsby, trained horses, and rode in the Grand National of 1951.
- Max Gold (1944-2017), born Grimsby, a well-known Hull solicitor, who represented families of trawlermen of lost fishing vessel The Gaul.
- Dr David Husain (1937-2007) was raised in Grimsby, later scientific adviser to the government (1974-1976), chemist at Cambridge University.
- Leo Solomon MBE (1930-2021) Jazz pianist, Director Grimsby Symphony Orchestra, music teacher and synagogue president.
- Mayors of Grimsby:
- Ald. Moses Abrahams JP (d. 1925), 1901-2.
- Ald.Isidore Abrahams OBE (c.1887-1962), 1929-30.
- Ald. Max Bloom JP (c.1891-1962), 1943-4.
- Ald. Wilfred Harris OBE (d.1961), 1954-6.
- Mayor of Cleethorpes:
- Ald. Wolf (Woolf) Solomon JP OBE (1899-1970), president of the synagogue, hoster of refugee committee 1939.
- Dr Nathan Robertson (b. Grimsby 1978) Biophysics and drug discovery scientist, notable in GPCR and antibody engineering.

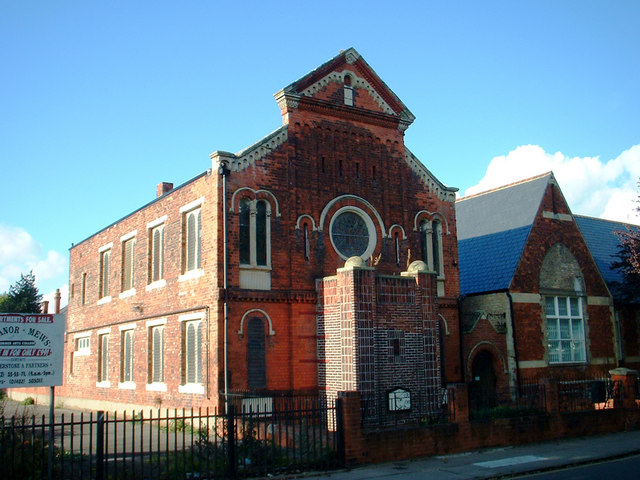
Sir Moses Montefiore Synagogue, Grimsby
