= Uskside Foundry =

Welsh company

Uskside Foundry in Newport, Wales was the home of Uskside Engineering, or Uskside Engineering and Rivet Co. Ltd.

Gwent Archives holds records for the company from 1889 to 1974.

The facility was erected by Charles M. Jacobs, who remained a director of the company until his death in 1919.

In 1889 Uskside Engineering & Rivet Co. Ltd. supplied the Philadelphia and Reading Railroad Company of the United States of America with "Stevens Improved Patent Fuel Presses", also known as Stevens underground engines.

John Hughes worked at the Uskside Foundry in the 1840s before going on to found his own business and eventually the New Russia Company Ltd, and thus Donetsk.
