= Ravenswood Tunnel =

Utility tunnel in New York City

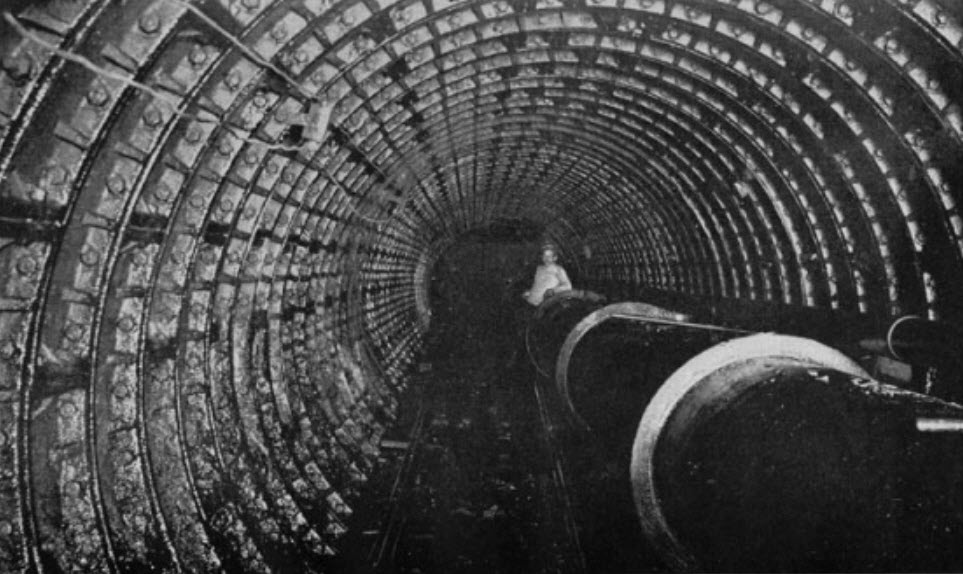
- Metal-lined section of the tunnel c. 1892
- Interactive map of Ravenswood Tunnel

Overview
- Other name: East River Gas Tunnel
- Location: Manhattan and Queens, New York City, US
- Coordinates: 40°45′47″N 73°56′56″W
- Crosses: East River

Operation
- Constructed: 1892–1894
- Owner: Con Edison

Technical
- Design engineer: Charles M. Jacobs
- Length: 2,516 ft (767 m)
- Tunnel clearance: 8.5 ft (2.6 m)
- Width: 10 ft (3.0 m)
- Grade: 1:200

The Ravenswood Tunnel, also known as the East River Gas Tunnel, is a utility tunnel located under the East River and Roosevelt Island in New York City, United States. It runs between East 71st Street in the Upper East Side neighborhood of Manhattan and 37th Avenue in the Ravenswood section of Queens. Completed in 1894, it was originally constructed to supply Manhattan with gas produced and stored in Queens and was the first underwater tunnel in New York City. The Ravenswood Tunnel—now owned by Con Edison—remains in operation and carries conduits for electric, gas, steam and telecommunications.

== History ==
=== Background ===
In April 1892, the New York State Legislature ratified a bill authorizing the East River Gas Company of Long Island City, Queens, to supply gas and electricity within the city of New York and lay and maintain gas mains under the East River. (Note: At the time, Queens was not part of New York City. It subsequently became part of New York City on January 1, 1898, when the five boroughs were consolidated.) The idea to supply gas to Manhattan via a tunnel was conceived by Emerson McMillin, president of the East River Gas Company, and members of the banking and brokerage firm H. B. Hollins & Co. At the time, Manhattan was densely populated, which prevented the construction of large new gas plants. Residents found these facilities to be highly undesirable and gas plants also became dangerous when naphtha was used in place of coal in the manufacturing process.

McMillian had met the English engineer Charles M. Jacobs and thought very highly of his abilities; he asked Jacobs to perform surveys and investigate the feasibility of digging a tunnel. In May 1892, preliminary surveys were made to obtain information about subsurface rock conditions along a route between the company's property at the foot of Webster Avenue (now 37th Avenue) in Ravenswood and a location between East 70th and 71st streets in Manhattan. (Note: Webster Avenue was renamed 37th Avenue by the Queens Topographical Bureau according to a grid plan in the early part of the twentieth century.) Bedrock was encountered only a few feet below the ends of the route and exposed bedrock was observed along the edges of the river and on Blackwell's Island (later renamed Roosevelt Island), which divided the river into two channels. A total of nine drill soundings were used to collect data below the riverbed, and these had to be made within a 15-minute window of slack tide due to the strong currents. As a result of the investigations, Jacobs concluded that solid rock extended across the entire distance of the route and planned the tunnel so that it would be 40 feet (12 m) below the riverbed. A contract to construct the tunnel was signed by McLaughlin, Reilly & Co. on June 25, 1892.

The project was supervised by Jacobs, who had John Vipond Davies and Walton I. Aims as his assistant engineers. The tunnel was planned to have a height of 8 1/2 feet (2.6 m) and a width of 10 feet (3.0 m). It was slightly sloped downward towards Queens at a gradient of 0.5% to allow for drainage.

=== Construction ===
Construction of the tunnel was started on June 28, 1892, with the excavation of a nine-by-nine-foot (2.7 by 2.7 m) shaft on the Queens end of the tunnel; work on the Manhattan shaft commenced on July 10, 1892. Excavation of the 139-foot-deep (42 m) Manhattan shaft was completed on October 29, 1892, while the 148-foot-deep (45 m) Queens shaft was finished on November 12, 1892. Surveys made to establish headings for the borings on each end of the tunnel determined that the center of the shafts were located 2,516.4 feet (767.0 m) apart from each other. To establish benchmarks, float readings were taken in the river at slack tide on consecutive days and used to calculate grades for the headings.

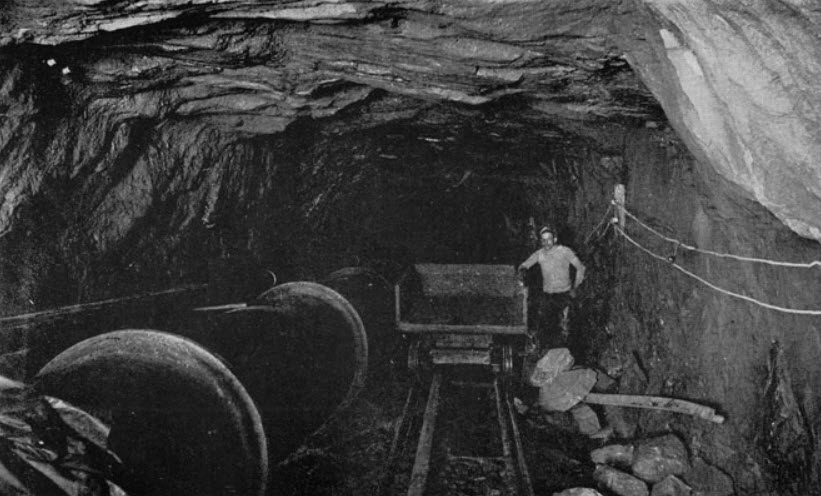
Unlined rock section of the tunnel, c. 1892

The tunnel was initially bored from both ends without any special mining methods, as it was expected to run through solid rock. However, in December 1892, workers encountered a fissure in the rock at a distance of 348 feet (106 m) from the Manhattan shaft. The solid rock on this heading transitioned to soft material beyond the initial fissure and also contained salt water, which softened up the material and washed it away, forming a cavity. The contractor wanted to abandon the heading and drill a new one about 50 feet (15 m) deeper with the hope of passing through solid rock, but Jacobs objected as there was no guarantee that the vein of soft material did not extend further down and also because the existing heading was at the limit of pressure that could be used for pneumatic tunneling.

A tunnelling shield was used to excavate the soft material, which was then lined with flanged cast iron plates that were bolted together. It was the first time that workers had encountered a "mixed working face" in a subaqueous tunnel, which required blasting out sections of rock in the soft mud ahead of the shield. There were several instances when salt water rushed inside, which created a geyser on the surface of the river and allowed animals and objects to enter the tunnel. The shield operated with a pressure of 48 pounds per square inch (330 kPa) through this area, which was the highest recorded pressure that workers had experienced in tunneling, and limited their time working under these conditions to 90 minutes at a time. A list of rules for men working under pressure was developed by Dr. Andrew H. Smith of Presbyterian Hospital, who had previously studied the effects of caisson disease on workers sinking a caisson for the Brooklyn Bridge.

The work of tunneling through soft ground led to disagreements with the contractor, who ended up abandoning the project. The work to complete the tunnel was taken up by the gas company under Jacobs' supervision. Another challenge to the project came during the Panic of 1893, when it became difficult to obtain funds to pay employee's wages and other expenses, requiring all work to essentially stop for a period of three and a half months. On May 16, 1894, a fire at the Jones's Wood picnic ground destroyed the buildings and equipment of the East River Gas Company at the Manhattan shaft site; the failure of the boilers resulted in a loss of pressure within the heading, which became flooded by water, resulting in a three week delay.

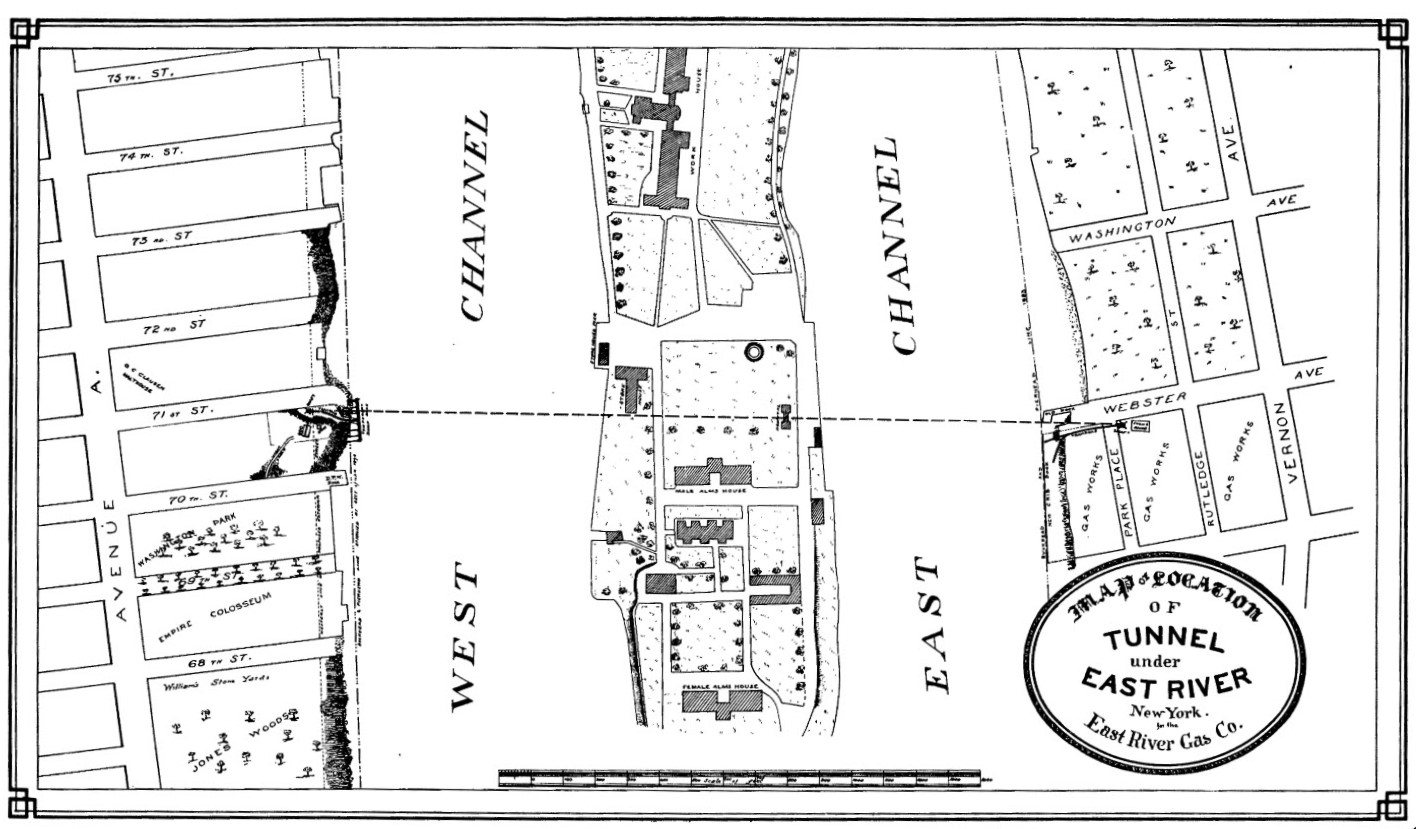
Map showing the route of the tunnel across both channels of the East River

The two headings of the tunnel were joined on July 11, 1894. The last charge of dynamite was blasted by Jacobs, who then proceeded to crawl through the opening side-by-side with Aims. The surveying work was so precisely carried out, the two headings met with a gap of no more than 1/2 inch (13 mm) horizontally and 1/10 foot (3.0 cm) vertically. Overall, the boring of the tunnel resulted in the death of four workers, all of which were attributable to the effects of caisson disease.

To celebrate the completion of the tunnel's excavation, on July 16, 1894, the East River Gas Company invited a group of its officers, guests, and news media to tour the tunnel. Donning oilskin suits, the party entered the tunnel at the Manhattan shaft and were transported to the Ravenswood shaft on small rail cars that were normally used to carry materials, after which a luncheon was held in the engine room at the gas plant, which was a quarter of the way towards being completed. To complete the tunnel, workers removed the air locks and installed a 36-inch (910 mm) gas main alongside a three-foot (0.91 m) narrow-gauge railway track.

=== Operation ===
Gas began flowing through the Ravenswood Tunnel to Manhattan on October 15, 1894. A six-inch (150 mm) gas main was subsequently added to provide gas service to Blackwell's Island. During this time, a four-inch (100 mm) pipe was also added and fitted with stopcocks; it supplied fresh air and could be used by workers inside the tunnel if needed.

Following the successful completion of the Ravenswood Tunnel, Jacobs earned the reputation as one of the leading designers of shield-driven tunnels. He was selected as the chief engineer to complete the Uptown Hudson Tubes, which were holed through on March 11, 1904, and were the first tunnels completed under the Hudson River between Manhattan and New Jersey. Jacobs subsequently was the engineer who designed the North River Tunnels under the Hudson River for the Pennsylvania Railroad.

After the East River Gas Company consolidated with the Equitable Gas Light Company to form the New Amsterdam Gas Company, Equitable's gas plant at the foot of East 42nd Street in Manhattan was shut down. The gas plant at Ravenswood was large enough to supply all of Equitable's customers and a second 36-inch (910 mm) gas main was installed in the tunnel to accommodate the additional gas for Manhattan. (Note: The New Amsterdam Gas Company was subsequently merged into Consolidated Edison in 1936.)

In the 21st century, the Ravenswood Tunnel is still in use and is owned by Con Edison; it carries conduits for electric, gas, steam and telecommunications. The steam carried through the tunnel is produced by the Ravenswood Steam Plant for distribution to the New York City steam system.
