= Marcus Bibbero =

Swimming promoter

Personal information
- Born: 1837 Wrzesnia, Prussia
- Died: 1910 (aged 72–73) Dalston, Greater London, Great Britain

Sport
- Sport: Swimming

Marcus (Mordechai) Bibbero (1837–1910) was brought up in the Jewish community of Hull, England. He became a celebrated world-class swimmer and cross-channel coach, who promoted life-saving and municipal baths.

== Biography ==
Bibbero was born in Wreschen, Prussia in 1837, migrating to Kingston-upon-Hull, East Yorkshire, England, at age 3 months with his family. His father peddled jewellery. From five years old he was "always in the water".

A somewhat eccentric figure, he first appears in British newspapers for assaulting reporters who investigated his Pepper's Ghost exhibition in Hull, a charge of which he was acquitted.

Having aged 19 married his cousin from Prussia, after all of his six children died in Hull, he took his swimming skills first to Manchester, often visiting Blackpool over 7 years to swim off the North pier. During one swimming exhibition there, he seems to have saved a girl's life.

In 1870 he went to London where, he later claimed, he had coached Captain Webb for his famous Channel swim, although it would seem Bibbero had no connection to Webb until after his 1875 swim.

Styling himself as Professor or Marquis Bibbero, he became an international sensation, for feats such as swimming with his hands manacled from Brooklyn to Manhattan in 1880. He was a trainer to other Channel Swimmers, including Madam Isacescu in 1902, to whom he acted as both trainer and pilot. He was, at various times, swimming teacher at the People's Palace in London, at the Gordon Boys Home in Dover and the Jewish Working Mens Club in the East End.

Bibbero was the inventor of various swimming techniques and life-saving aids.

In 1908, to celebrate his golden wedding and the 33rd anniversary of Captain Webb's famous crossing, Bibbero gave a display of swimming off the coast of Dover.

He died in 1910 in Dalston, London.
