= Mexican Light and Power Company =

Former electrical generation and distribution company in Mexico

- Founded: 10 September 1902
- Defunct: 5 November 1992
- Headquarters: Toronto, Ontario

The Mexican Light and Power Company, Limited was a Canadian-owned electrical generation and distribution company in Mexico founded in 1902.
