= Brassey =

Brassey is a surname. Notable people with the surname include:

- Albert Brassey (1844–1918), British rower, soldier and Conservative politician
- Anna Brassey (née Allnutt) (1839–1887), English traveller and writer
- Baron Brassey of Apethorpe (Northampton), title in the Peerage of the United Kingdom
- Bill Brassey, English bare-knuckle boxer
- Earl Brassey, title in the Peerage of the United Kingdom
- Harold Brassey, British polo champion
- Henry Brassey (1840–1891), British Member of Parliament
- Henry Brassey, 1st Baron Brassey of Apethorpe (1870–1958), British Conservative politician
- Hugh Trefusis Brassey (1915–1990), British soldier and magistrate
- Nathaniel Brassey (c. 1697–1765), British banker and politician
- Nathaniel Brassey Halhed (1751–1830), English Orientalist and philologist
- Robert Bingham Brassey (1875–1946), British Conservative Party politician
- Rowan Brassey (born 1956), New Zealand lawn bowls player
- Thomas Brassey (1805–1870), English civil engineering contractor and manufacturer of building materials
- Thomas Brassey, 1st Earl Brassey (1836–1918), British Liberal Party politician
- Thomas Brassey, 2nd Earl Brassey (1863–1919), editor of The Naval Annual
- Willoughby Brassey (1818–1904), Royal Navy, East India Company, Major in Taranaki Military Settlers

== See also ==
- Brassey's Naval Annual
- Brassey Green, village in Cheshire, England
- Brassey SSSI, nature reserve in Gloucestershire, England
- Peto, Brassey and Betts, civil engineering partnership between Samuel Morton Peto, Thomas Brassey and Edward Betts
