= Harold Ernest Brassey =

English polo player

Lieutenant Colonel Harold Ernest Brassey (29 March 1877 – 15 July 1916) was a polo champion who was killed in World War I.

== Personal life ==
Brassey was the third of five sons (there being also seven daughters) of politician Henry Arthur Brassey (1840–1891), J.P., D.L., of Preston Hall, Aylesford, Kent. His grandfather, Thomas Brassey, was a civil engineer, responsible at the time of his death for one in every twenty miles of railway in the world, and his uncle, also Thomas Brassey, Governor of Victoria from 1895 to 1900, was created Baron Brassey in 1886, and Earl Brassey in 1911. An elder brother, Conservative politician Henry Brassey, was created a baronet in 1922, and Baron Brassey of Apethorpe in 1938.

In 1906, Brassey married Lady Norah Hely-Hutchinson (1880–1964), daughter of the 5th Earl of Donoughmore; they had three daughters. His widow subsequently remarried twice.

== Polo and military career ==
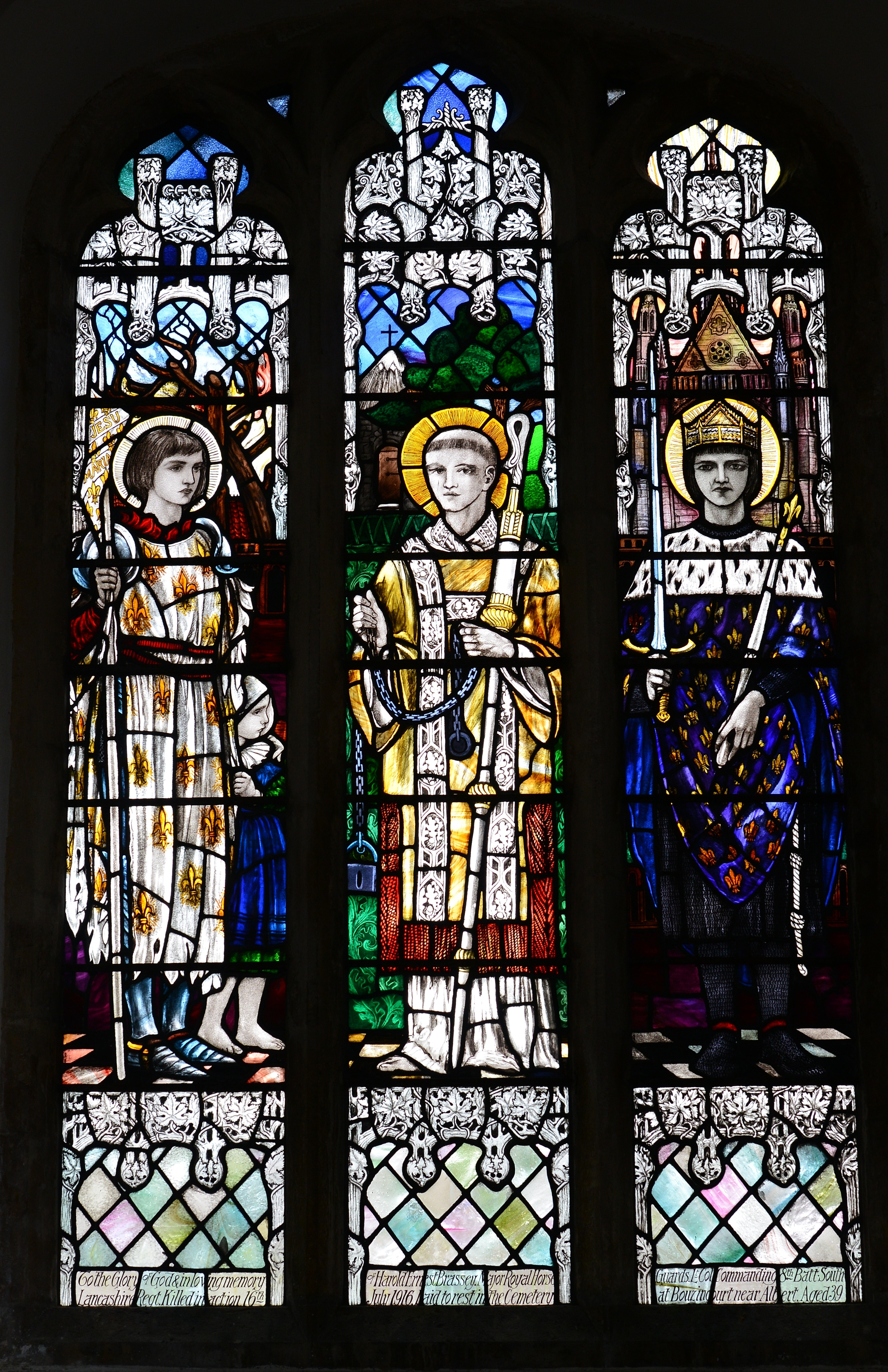
Memorial window dedicated to Harold Ernest Brassey at St Leonard's Church, Apethorpe

He won the Inter-regimental cup in polo in 1910 and 1912. He was killed during the Battle of Bazentin Ridge during the Battle of the Somme whilst serving with the Royal Horse Guards (attd. 8th Bn. South Lancashire Regiment). He is buried at Bouzincourt Communal Cemetery Extension.

== Teammates ==
- 1910 Royal Horse Guards: Capt. Adrian Carton de Wiart, Capt. Charles B. Hornby, Capt. Harold Ernest Brassey, John F. Harrison.
- 1912 Royal Horse Guards: Capt. Geoffrey V.S. Bowlby, Capt. Lord Alastair Innes-Ker, Capt. Harold Ernest Brassey, Capt. John F. Harrison.
