= Baron Brassey of Apethorpe =

Barony in the Peerage of the United Kingdom

- Arms of Brassey: Per fess indented sable and argent, in the first quarter a mallard of the second [1]
- Creation date: 1938
- Created by: George VI
- Peerage: United Kingdom
- First holder: Henry Brassey, 1st Baron Brassey of Apethorpe
- Present holder: Edward Brassey, 4th Baron Brassey of Apethorpe
- Heir apparent: Hon. Christian Brassey
- Motto: Saepe in difficultate, nunquam timent.

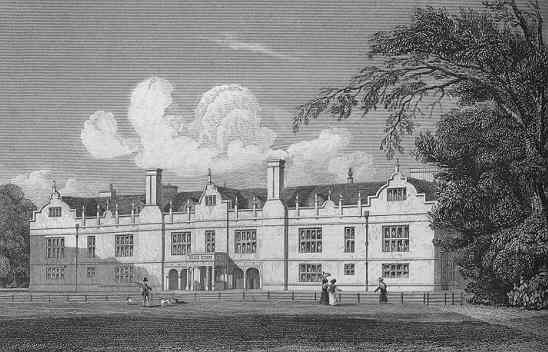
Apethorpe Hall in 1829

Baron Brassey of Apethorpe, of Apethorpe in the County of Northampton, is a title in the Peerage of the United Kingdom. It was created in 1938 for Sir Henry Brassey, 1st Baronet, who had previously represented Northamptonshire Northern and Peterborough in the House of Commons as a Conservative. He had already been created a Baronet, of Apethorpe in the County of Northampton, in 1922. Brassey was the second but eldest surviving son of Henry Brassey, third son of Thomas Brassey, and the nephew of Thomas Brassey, 1st Earl Brassey, and Albert Brassey. as of 2022 the titles are held by his great-grandson, the fourth Baron, who succeeded his father in 2015. The title and territorial designation are correctly pronounced App-thorp, and still by the family, although increasingly Ape-thorp by others.

The family seat is The Manor House, Apethorpe, Northamptonshire

== Brassey baronets, of Apethorpe (1922) ==
=== Baron Brassey of Apethorpe (1938) ===
- Henry Leonard Campbell Brassey, 1st Baron Brassey of Apethorpe (1870–1958)
- Bernard Thomas Brassey, 2nd Baron Brassey of Apethorpe (1905–1967)
- David Henry Brassey, 3rd Baron Brassey of Apethorpe (1932–2015)
- Edward Brassey, 4th Baron Brassey of Apethorpe (born 1964)

The heir apparent is the 4th Baron's only son, the Hon. Christian Brassey (born 2003).

=== Title succession chart ===
Succession of the Barons Brassey, Earls Brassey, Brassey baronets and Barons Brassey of Apethorpe.

Thomas Brassey; 1793–1866
Baron Brassey; Earl Brassey
Thomas Brassey; 1st Earl Brassey; 1st Baron Brassey; 1836–1918	Henry Brassey; 1840–1891
Brassey baronets Baron Brassey of Apethorpe
Thomas Brassey; 2nd Earl Brassey; 1863–1919	Henry Brassey; 1st Baron Brassey of Apethorpe; 1st Baronet; 1870–1958
Barony and earldom extinct
Ronald Brassey; 1895–1895	Capt. Hon. Cecil Brassey; 1896–1949	Lt. Gerald Brassey; 1898–1918	John Brassey; 1903–1903	Bernard Brassey; 2nd Baron Brassey of Apethorpe; 1905–1967
David Brassey; 3rd Baron Brassey of Apethorpe; 1932–2015
Edward Brassey; 4th Baron Brassey of Apethorpe born 1964
Hon. Christian Brassey born 2003

=== Line of succession ===
- Henry Leonard Campbell Brassey, 1st Baron Brassey of Apethorpe (1870–1958)
  - Bernard Thomas Brassey, 2nd Baron Brassey of Apethorpe (1905–1967)
    - David Henry Brassey, 3rd Baron Brassey of Apethorpe (1932–2015)
      - Edward Brassey, 4th Baron Brassey of Apethorpe (born 1964)
        - (1) Hon. Christian Brassey (born 2003)
    - Hon. Thomas Ian Brassey (1934–2022)
      - (2) (Thomas) Hugh Brassey (born 1971)
        - (3) Sam Brassey
  - Maj. Hon. Peter Esmé Brassey (1907–1995)
    - (4) Henry Charles Brassey (born 1947)
      - (5) Thomas Charles Brassey (born 1971)
    - (6) Richard Edwin Brassey (born 1949)
      - (7) George Peter Brassey (born 1987)

== See also ==
- Earl Brassey
