= Barentin Viaduct =

Coordinates: 49°32′51″N 0°57′24″E

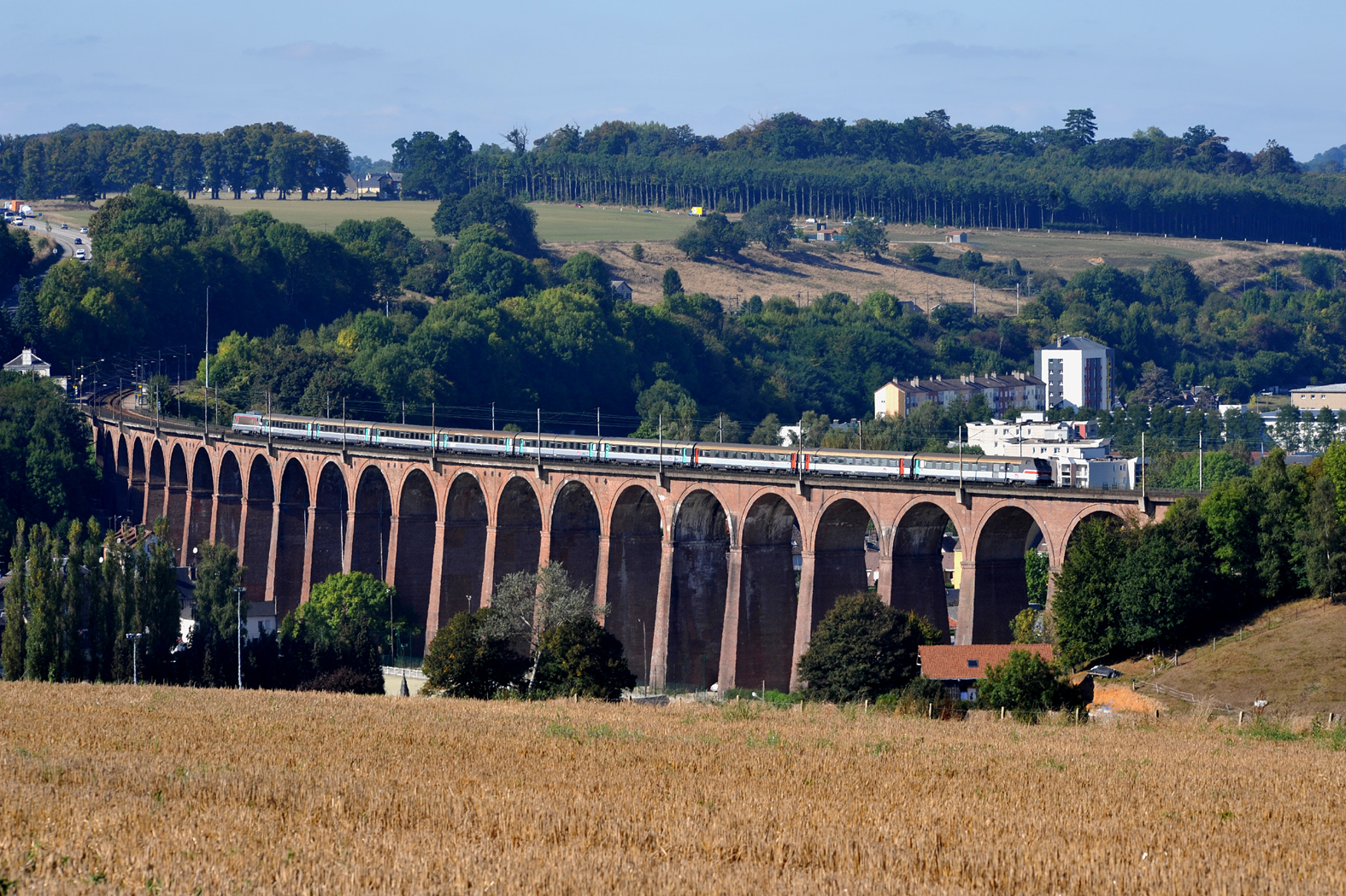
Barentin Viaduct today, also known as the Pont Austreberthe, near Rouen

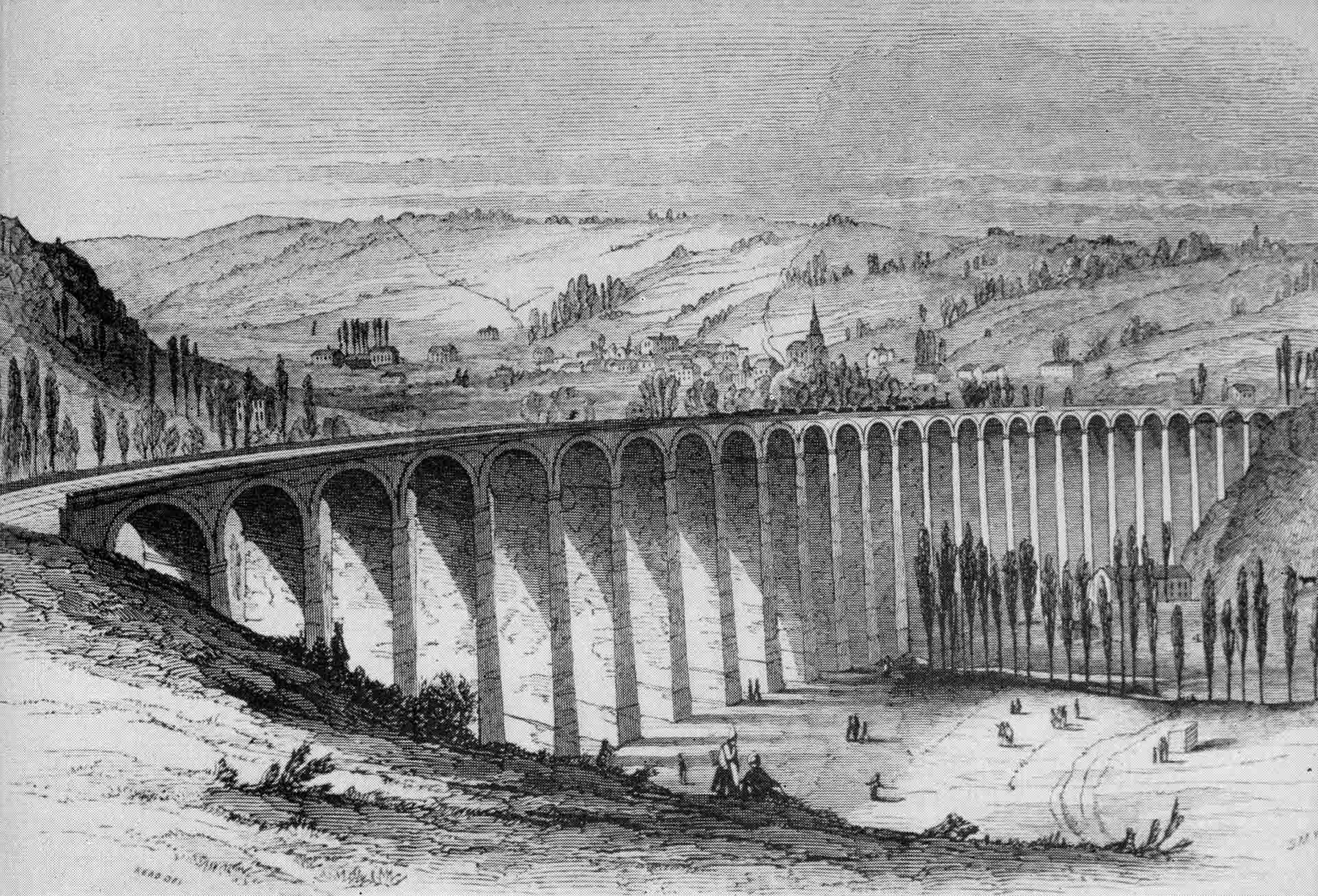
Barentin viaduct in the 19th century after rebuilding

Barentin Viaduct is a railway viaduct that crosses the Austreberthe River on the Paris–Le Havre line near to the town of Barentin, Normandy, France, about 12 miles (19 km) from Rouen. It was constructed of brick with 27 arches, 100 feet (30 m) high with a total length of 600 yards (549 m). The British engineer was Joseph Locke and the contractors were William Mackenzie and Thomas Brassey.

Shortly after it was completed, after several days of heavy rain, the viaduct collapsed on 10 January 1846. The cause of the collapse was never determined. One theory was that it had been filled with ballast before the mortar was dry. Another theory blamed the lime mortar which had been obtained from local sources. Whatever the cause, Brassey rebuilt the viaduct at his own expense, this time using lime of his own choice. The viaduct reopened in 1847, and still stands and is in use today.

The building of the Viaduct is fictionalized in Julian Barnes's short story "Junction," published in his 1996 volume Cross Channel.
