= George Heald =

British civil engineer

- Born: 2 June 1816; Wakefield, Yorkshire, England
- Died: 25 May 1858 (aged 41); Rugeley, Staffordshire, England
- Occupation: Civil engineer
- Parent(s): Thomas and Sarah Heald (née Murray)

George Heald (2 June 1816 – 25 May 1858) was an English civil engineer active at the beginning of the 19th century, notable for his role in the building of railways that formed part of the Grand Junction Railway, the Lancaster and Carlisle Railway, the Caledonian Railway and the North Midland Railway. Nowadays he is largely forgotten but to his contemporaries and those that followed immediately afterwards, he was one of the key engineers of the early railway age being listed alongside Brunel, Stephenson, Locke and Cubitt in George Drysdale Dempsey's book, the Practical Railway Engineer. He was a colleague and friend of Robert Stephenson and also worked with other notable railway engineers such as Joseph Locke and Thomas Brassey.

== Early years ==
George was born and raised in Wakefield, Yorkshire. His father, Thomas Heald, was a wealthy hatter and parfumier. Thomas Heald's business interests involved travelling to London. After he was widowed he married Sarah Murray of Westminster, London who was eighteen years his junior. George was born to Sarah and was raised in a small family with nine out of ten elder step-siblings having died. The family was well educated and Sarah and her sister, Ann, ran a school founded under the auspices of the Gaskell family that included Elizabeth Gaskell, at Thornes near Wakefield. George was educated from a young age in this environment and achieved a high competence in maths as his published material demonstrates.

== Railway Engineer ==
By 1839 he was a qualified civil engineer and made a presentation to the Institution of Civil Engineers in London about the Land Surveyors Calculator. Unlike some of his early contemporaries in the construction of railways who were practical men, George Heald was concerned with the theory and science of railway construction. Two surviving publications demonstrate his interest in communicating the principles of railway construction. In 1838 he published a booklet entitled, "Description and use of Heald's Universal Scale for measuring earthworks". A further book was published by Weale and Co. of London, technical and medical publishers, in 1847, "A complete and much improved system of setting out railway curves. Comprising, at one, brevity, simplicity and accuracy".

Heald was a highly regarded teacher in the field of railway civil engineering. Richard Price-Williams an honorary fellow of the Institute of Mechanical Engineers, who in 1866 persuaded the railway companies to use steel rails, cited George Heald on more than one occasion. In an interview given in 1894 Price-Williams said he began his career with 'the eminent engineer George Heald who was responsible for the construction of so many of the great British railways'. In Price-Williams' obituary of 1916 the author said that he had been 'a pupil of the late Mr. George Heald, M. Inst. C.E., on the construction of the Lancaster, Carlisle, and Caledonian Railways in the forties of the last century'.

In 1841 George was living at home in Wakefield with his mother and sister, Eliza. On the census his profession was described as a land surveyor. At this time he was one of three resident engineers employed in building the North Midland Railway. On 14 July 1841 a celebration in honour of the resident engineers was held by the contractors at the Strafford Arms Hotel in Wakefield.

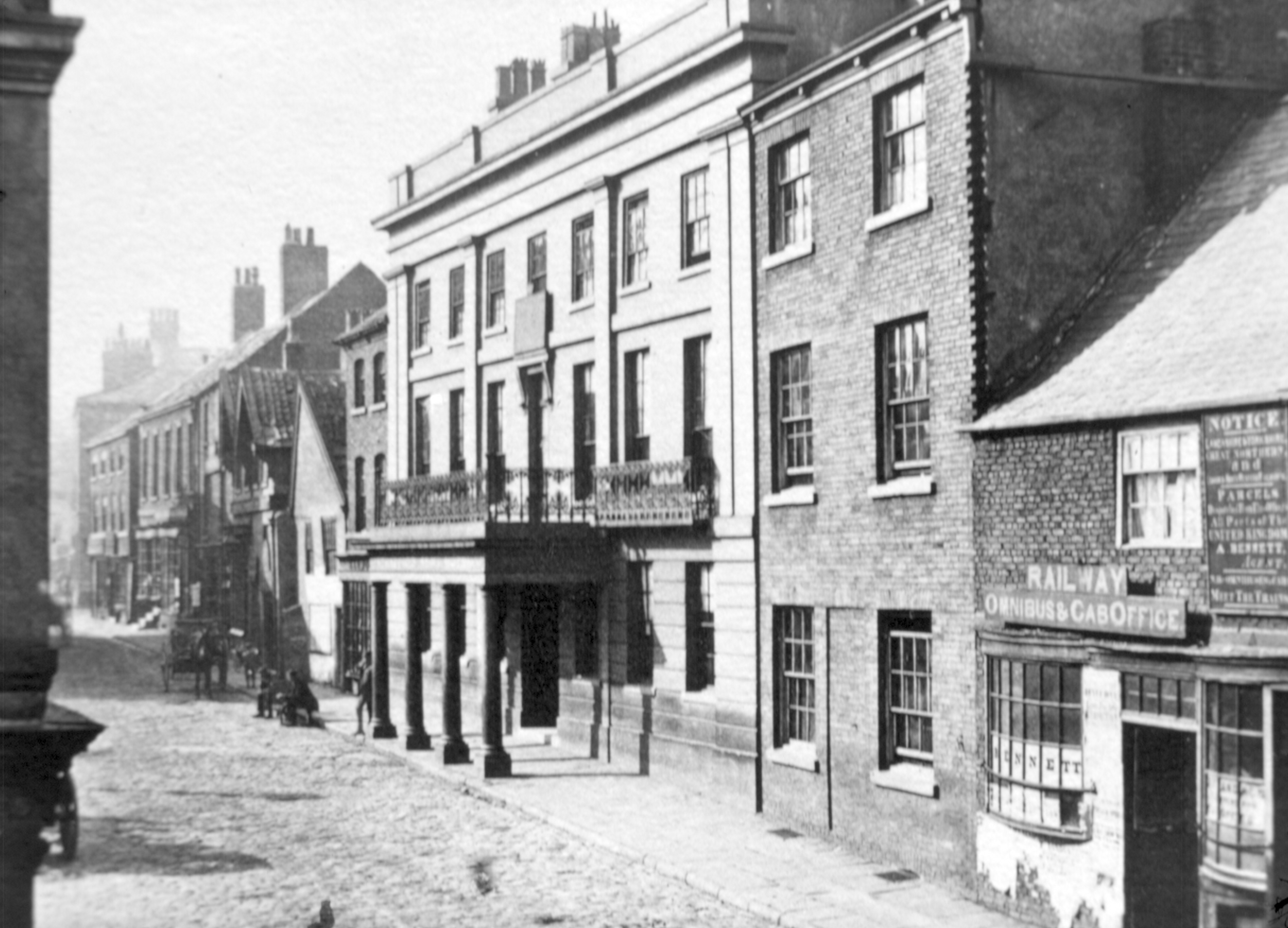
A picture of the Strafford Arms Hotel as it appeared at the end of the 19th century. The hotel is still extant but much altered.

It was a lavish affair to celebrate the completion of the railway. It was attended by Mr Houldsworth the Wakefield MP, and engineers from other railway companies such as the Midland Counties Railway (Mr Woodhouse), the Manchester and Leeds Railway (Mr Forsyth) and the Sheffield and Rotherham Railway (Mr Dobbs). Two of Heald’s long-term associates, both contractors, are also listed: Taylor Stephenson (who reported his death in 1858) and George Mould.

He held the post of civil engineer on the North Midland Railway between Barnsley and Leeds until at least 1843 when he applied for the post of Borough Surveyor with the Council of the Borough of Leeds and made the shortlist of four. He was unsuccessful with the post being awarded to another railway engineer.

From the mid-1840s Heald was active in the construction of the main line between Lancaster and Carlisle in conjunction with Joseph Locke, Thomas Brassey, William Mackenzie and John Stephenson.

In 1844, together with Joseph Locke, Thomas Brassey and John Stephenson, he constructed the Kendal and Windermere Railway, a branch line of the Lancaster and Carlisle Railway. The opening of the railway was celebrated with a dinner at the Crown Hotel, Bowness. This event was attended by Mr. Watson, resident engineer, Mr. George Heald, Mr. John Hudson, Mr. Thomas Hudson, secretary to the company, Mr. Miles Thompson (the builder of the stations), Mr. Wm. Rawlinson and Mr. Hunt, of the London and North Western locomotive department. Watson paid tribute to Heald for his work in engineering the line while Heald in turn paid tribute to his predecessor, Joseph Locke. The toasts were proposed to the contractors, particularly Mr. Heald and Mr. Rawlinson. A further toast was made to Messrs. Brassey, Mackenzie, and Stephenson, and to couple the toast with the names of Mr. Heald and Mr. Rawlinson. The view was that this railway was a triumph of engineering – "This had been called the gem of railways, and the part of the contractors had been to brush away the dross, to bring the gem out of its natural habitat, and present it before their eyes in all its beauty."

However, not everybody agreed. This railway was vigorously opposed by William Wordsworth who wrote a sonnet bemoaning the coming of the railway. His letters to the editor of the Morning Post are reproduced in The Illustrated Wordsworth's Guide to the Lakes, P. Bicknell, Ed. (Congdon and Weed, New York, 1984), pp. 186–198. His reactions to the technological and "picturesque" incursions of man on his beloved, wild landscape most famously include the following sonnet:

Is then no nook of English ground secure
From rash assault? Schemes of retirement sown
In youth, and 'mid the busy world kept pure
As when their earliest flowers of hope were blown,
Must perish;—how can they this blight endure?
And must he too the ruthless change bemoan
Who scorns a false utilitarian lure
'Mid his paternal fields at random thrown?
Baffle the threat, bright Scene, from Orresthead
Given to the pausing traveller's rapturous glance:
Plead for thy peace, thou beautiful romance
Of nature; and, if human hearts be dead,
Speak, passing winds; ye torrents, with your strong
And constant voice, protest against the wrong.

On the opening of the railway in 1847 George Heald wrote an impassioned riposte to Wordsworth accusing the poet of wanting to obstruct the opportunities and freedom that the railway would bring for ordinary people. His poem is dated 15 April 1847. He argues for the democratising influence of the railway and the cultural and social benefits it will bring rather than the economic reasons that might be expected from a railway engineer:

Baffle the Rail, bright scene from Orrest Head,
Somewhere in Wordsworth I this line have read;
Who calls on Winds and Torrents fierce and strong
In sound and fury to forbid the wrong.
They heard the call in vain; – on "English ground"
"No sacred nook" has ever yet been found
To scare the dead, when enterprise could throw
A fair surmise, that "flowers of hope" might grow.
Our "earliest flowers" we offer to the Bard,
Although his compliments were rather hard;
"Round his paternal fields at random throw"
No "false" enchantments; but a kindly glow;-
"Utilitarian lures?" – 'tis even so.
To feast upon the "beautiful romance"
"Given to the pausing traveller's rapturous glance,"
Shall be the lot of thousands who shall feel
The vast advantage of a road of steel;
Who 'mongst its pleasing features shall recount,
An easy pilgrimage to Rydal Mount,

"Retirement" "from the busy world, kept pure"
They may admire, but could not well endure;
The Bard need not "the ruthless change bemoan"
When Art flings double charms round Nature's throne.
The Train has stopped it buzzing, roaring wheels,
But the Lake's ripples follow at its heels:
For gliding down its bosom, smooth and clear,
Steamers on Windermere itself appear:-
How shall the Poet's soul "this blight endure!"
His powers will sink! – I fear to rise no more:-
"The rash assault!" "Are humans so dead"
To all that fills a poet with such dread;
As to commit such outrage, and such wrong
In spite of protests which though vain were long?
Come to the bar ye wriggling Rail and Barge
Say if ye can, – Not Guilty! to the charge.
Or why invade the land, (the Plaintiff pleads)
Sacred to solitude, to rocks and weeds;
O'er my "paternal fields" a line to throw
Comes near the darker verge of human woe:
Why give each town-cramp'd soul the sight so grand
To view the peaks that decorate our land?
Speak! – answer why! – or crumble into sand
The Rail and Barge both glory in the deed,
To the impeachment gladly Guilty plead,
But conscious of the bounties they dispense
They offer this, a short and firm defence.
Not to disturb the pure and classic fount
That graceful, flows in ink from Rydal Mount,
But to unite the ground with tamer scenes,
And show to each, that each with beauty teems:
To give the hamlets of the mountain dells
The Arts in which the busy South excells;
To give the South to view the peaks sublime,
That bid defiance to the scythe of time;
To give to town-cramp'd souls the power to soar,
And taste of pleasures never known before:-
We won our way – through rocks – o'er waters grand,
Opening, (we trust) the beauties of the land.
If from "paternal fields" we take a part,
We pay most handsomely by way of smart;
We give a double value for the slice,
And make the remnant worth a double price.
And for the Bard, – (as Off'ring for our crimes)
We'll give the world to appreciate his rhymes,
The mind will surely place his beauties higher
When read 'mid scenes that did the thoughts inspire,
We'll spread his fame: – what more can he require?
Are not these motives good, and clear, and strong,
Full satisfaction for the sons of song?
Carrying conviction wheresoever read,
Appealing to the heart, as well as head.
Conscious from wrong our cause we have been clearing,
We'll give the Plaintiff good Words,-worth the hearing
The judgement of a jury never fearing.

During 1845 and 1846 Heald was Thomas Brassey's engineer during the difficult construction of the Caledonian Railway from Carlisle to Glasgow.

In May 1846, while staying in the Imperial Hotel at Covent Garden, Heald wrote a letter to George Mould in Carlisle. The contents of the letter indicate that Heald was drawing up plans for the North Western Railway; or more precisely the Little North Western Railway. It is evident that Mould is the contractor for the railway and he has been asked to reduce the cost of the railway. He has been charged with designing a railway that will be constructed for £800,000. Heald's answer suggests that this figure is too low and impossible to achieve:

I have calculated the differences that would be made in the masonry supporting all the bridges were square instead of a good number being skew, and taking the lengths of all culverts as being adapted to embankments where the slopes are one and a half to one instead of two to one. And respecting the alteration that could be made in the earthworks of the present section by employing steeper gradients it is not probable that (without increasing the amount of the embankments) they could by any alteration get rid of the present amount of spoil 1,432,275 c.yds and at the same time dispense with the side cutting of 336,185 c.yds.

But, if these impossibilities could be surmounted the estimate might be reduced from £1,258,519 to £1,076,433 leaving it still £276, 433 above Mr. Watson's limits of £800,000.

George Heald worked closely with William Mackenzie from 1848. Mackenzie's diary records Heald dining at Mackenzie's house in Liverpool.. During 1849 Heald went, on two occasions, with Mackenzie and Brassey to consult with lawyers in Carlisle. All of these men were involved at that time in building railways in Lancashire and northwards into Scotland. In 1851 Heald was working in Liverpool, staying on the night of the census, at the Royal Waterloo Hotel in Great Crosby. He was described as a civil engineer and he was accompanied by a land agent, George Williams. He was almost certainly working on the Liverpool, Crosby & Southport Railway which was begun by George Robert Stephenson in 1848.

There is little information so far found about his activities during the 1850s. It seems that his career was cut short. In 1851 he wrote his last will and testament. He was just 34 years old and yet he bequeathed his entire estate to his mother, Sarah, who was 71 years old. It is evident that George was a sick man and didn't expect to live much longer. He had contracted tuberculosis. In the event he lasted another seven years and outlived his mother. His estate passed to his sister, Eliza. In his last engineering project he was engaged as the civil engineer for the construction of the Cannock Mineral Railway by the railway contractor, Taylor Robinson Stephenson. However Heald's health declined further and around the end of 1857 Thomas Brassey was engaged to complete the task. Heald died in May 1858 at Market Street, Rugeley, Staffordshire. He was 41 years old. His death was reported by T. R. Stephenson.

== George Heald the man ==
George Heald left no written account of his life. The reason for this was his busy professional life and his early death. Being unmarried his only surviving relatives consisted of just two siblings; his sister Eliza who was a spinster and his step-brother Charles who had been estranged from the family having gone to sea as a ship's captain and had led a disreputable life that included bigamous marriage and a spell in a debtors' prison in Calcutta. Heald also did not hold public office like some of his contemporaries. He died away from his origins in Wakefield and it seems nobody wrote an obituary. And yet we can tell much about him. There is no doubt of his intelligence and education. He could switch between advanced maths and poetic riposte with ease. His answer to Wordsworth seems to be the only piece of writing he left beyond his professional engineering publications. It is also evident from the memoirs of others that he was held in high regard and affection by his fellow engineers.

== Legacy ==
George Heald was one of the pre-eminent railway engineers of the early nineteenth century. In the preface to his book, The Practical Railway Engineer which was published in 1855, George Drysdale Dempsey names the key engineers that powered the development of the railways. He naturally cites famous engineers like George Stephenson, Robert Stephenson, Isambard Kingdom Brunel, Joseph Locke and William Cubitt as well as George Heald. Heald's legacy is in two parts. He was a prolific engineer who built many major railways with the Stephensons, Joseph Locke and Thomas Brassey. Notable among these is the northern part of the West Coast Main Line that is still a key element of British railway infrastructure 170 years after its construction. But he also laid the foundations for other engineers by developing techniques such as the land surveyors calculator and the mathematical method for calculating curves on railways. He also had the ability to communicate these methods in presentations and through publication. Techniques like these enabled the railways to be built along scientific principles rather than the frequently rough and ready measures used in the earliest days. It was part of a progression to faster and safer rail transport.

== Bibliography used for notes ==
- The land surveyor's calculator – author: George Heald, Source: Minutes of the Proceedings, Volume 1, Issue 1838, 1 January 1838, page 25 (Institution of Civil Engineers)
- A Complete and Much Improved System of Setting Out Railway Curves, Comprising at One Brevity, Simplicity and Accuracy – Weale & Co., London, 1847 – 11 pages Second edition (Copy at British Library, St Pancras, London)
- Description and Use of Heald's Universal Scale for Measuring Earthwork – the Author, Thornes Wakefield 1838 (Copy at Manchester University Library)
- Evening Post, Rōrahi XLVII, Putanga 63, 15 Poutūterangi 1894 (NZ), Page 4 Railways, Settlement, And Coal. A Chat With Mr. Price-Williams. (http://paperspast.natlib.govt.nz/cgi-bin/paperspast?a=d&d=EP18940315.2.41&l=mi&e=-------10--1----2--)
- A Well-Spent Life. Memoir Of Cornelius Nicholson, J P., D.L., F.G.S., F S.A. With A Selection Of His Lectures And Letters. Published by T. Wilson, Kendal, 1890
- Obituary. Richard Price-Williams, 1827–1916. Author: unknown, Source: Minutes of the Proceedings of the Institution of Civil Engineers, Volume 203, Issue 1917, 1 January 1917, page 421 (https://www.imeche.org/knowledge/library/institution-and-engineering-history/honorary-fellows)
- The Practical Railway Engineer by G. Drysdale Dempsey, John Weale, London, 1855 (https://steamindex.com/people/stephen.htm)
- Reply to Wordsworth's sonnet on the Kendal & Windermere Railway by George Heald, Orrest Head : s.n. 1847. Located in the Brotherton Special Collections, University of Leeds (Shelf mark: Collection Gen WOR/H)
