= Albert Brassey =

British rower, soldier and politician

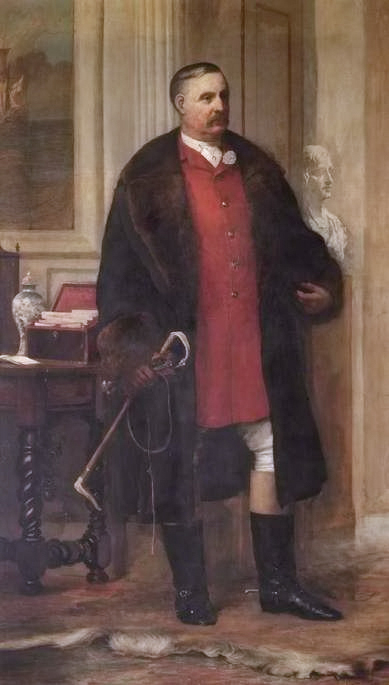
Albert Brassey (Walter William Ouless, c. 1890)

Colonel Albert Brassey (22 February 1844 – 7 January 1918) was a British rower, soldier and Conservative member of parliament for Banbury 1895–1906.

== Life ==
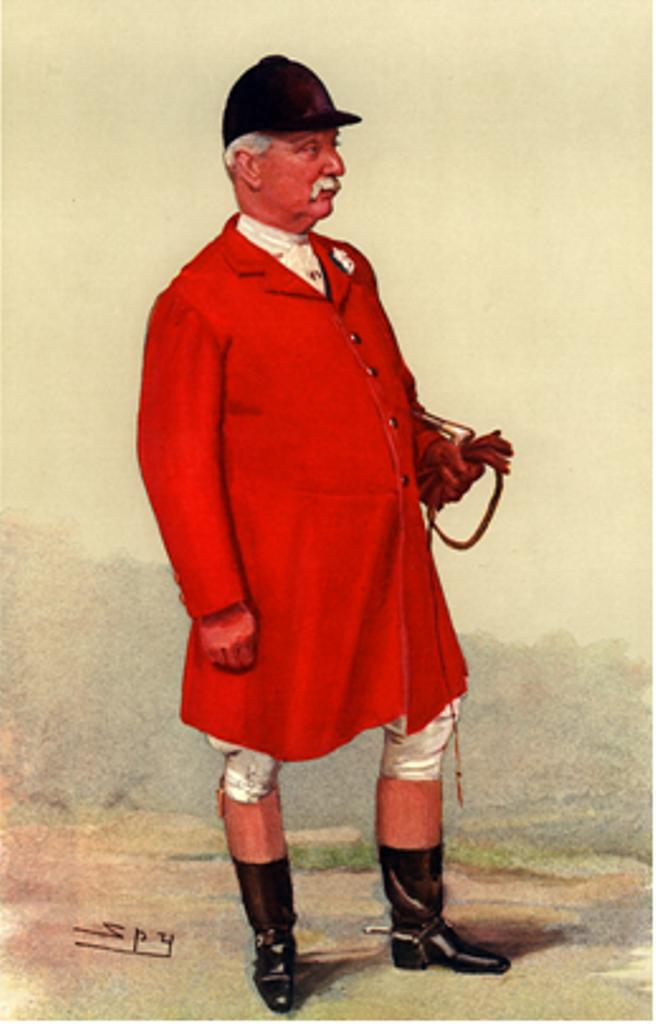
Albert Brassey from Vanity Fair

Brassey was the fourth son of the railway contractor Thomas Brassey and his wife Maria, daughter of Thomas Harrison. The Liberal MP Thomas Brassey, 1st Earl Brassey, and Henry Brassey were his elder brothers and Henry Brassey, 1st Baron Brassey of Apethorpe, his nephew. He was educated at Eton and University College, Oxford. Brassey rowed bow to Charles Bennett Lawes’ stroke at Eton in the 1861 School Pulling and in the 1862 Eight. At Oxford, Brassey was a member of the winning University College crew in the Grand Challenge Cup and the Ladies' Challenge Plate at Henley Royal Regatta in 1863. In 1864 he was in the winning crew of the Visitors' Challenge Cup. In 1866, he was in the winning crews in the Grand rowing for Oxford Etonian, the Stewards' Challenge Cup for University College, and Visitors' .

Brassey was a Lieutenant in the 14th Hussars and a Colonel in the Queen's Own Oxfordshire Hussars and served as High Sheriff of Oxfordshire in 1878. In 1895 he entered Parliament for Banbury, a seat he held until 1906. He lived at Charlton Park, Gloucestershire, Heythrop Hall, Chipping Norton, Oxfordshire, and at 29 Berkeley Square, London.

== Family ==
Brassey married the Hon. Maria Matilda Helena, daughter of John Charles Robert Bingham, 4th Baron Clanmorris, in 1871. They had three sons and five daughters. He died in January 1918, aged 73. His wife, who was appointed an OBE in 1919, died in July 1943. Their eldest son Robert also represented Banbury in the House of Commons very briefly in 1910.

== Notes ==
Parliament of the United Kingdom
Preceded by Sir Bernhard Samuelson	Member of Parliament for Banbury; 1895–1906	Succeeded by Eustace Fiennes
