= The Naval Annual =

British naval periodical, 1886–1992

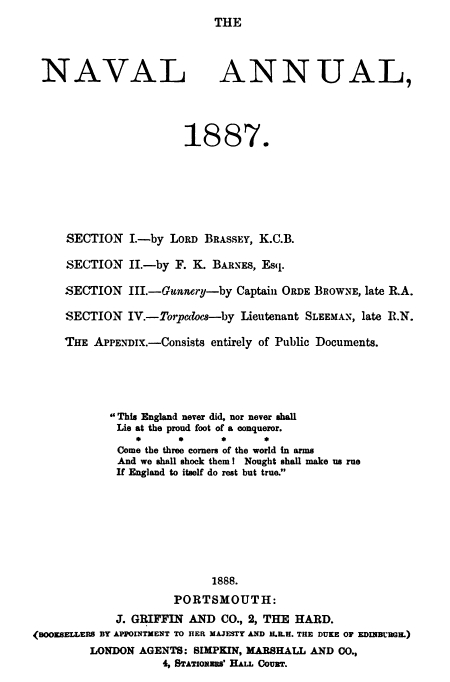
Title page of 1887 edition, published 1888

The Naval Annual was a periodical that provided considerable text and graphic information (largely concerning the British Royal Navy) which had previously been obtainable only by consulting a wide range of often foreign language publications. During its life it underwent a number of title changes.

The Annual was started by Thomas Brassey, 1st Earl Brassey, in 1886. Though often compared with Jane's Fighting Ships, the two British annuals were, in fact quite different. The Brassey series began a dozen years earlier, and its special strength was the dozen or more detailed articles on naval (plus, from 1920 through 1935, merchant marine) matters, authored by experts. They covered British and other nations' naval developments ranging from the latest ships to overall policy.

The first five or six Brassey volumes used a second printing colour (a light blue green) to highlight armored portions of naval vessels' hulls. Through 1949, the series was also known for its extensive tabular presentations of individual ship details. But unlike Jane's, the Brassey series was not designed for use in identifying ships at sea. Starting with the 1950 volume, content broadened to cover air force and army topics in addition to naval material, with a continued emphasis on British forces. Long runs of the Brassey volumes are relatively uncommon in American libraries.

== Editors of Brassey's annuals 1886–1992 ==
=== Naval Annual ===
- 1886–1890 Lord Brassey
- 1891–1899 T. A. Brassey
- 1900–1901 John Leyland
- 1902–1905 T. A. Brassey
- 1906 John Leyland and T. A. Brassey
- 1907–1913 T. A. Brassey (Viscount Hythe from 1911)
- 1914 Viscount Hythe and J. Leyland (The title became Brassey's Naval Annual.)
- 1915–1916 John Leyland (These two volumes excluded many details of Royal Navy vessels so as not to aid the enemy.)
- 1917–1918 Not published
- 1919 2nd Earl Brassey and J. Leyland

=== Naval and Shipping Annual ===
(For this 15-year period, the Annual covered naval and merchant shipping, plus occasional articles on maritime aviation.)

- 1920–1928 Sir Alexander Richardson and Archibald Hurd
- 1929 C. N. Robinson
- 1930–1935 C. N. Robinson and H. M. Ross

=== Brassey's Naval Annual ===
- 1936 C. N. Robinson
- 1937–1949 H. G. Thursfield (The 1948 volume differed from all before and after—it was devoted to printing Hitler's naval conference proceedings.)

=== Brassey's Annual – The Armed Forces Yearbook ===
- 1950–1963 H. G. Thursfield
- 1964–1973 J. L. Moulton

=== Royal United Services Institute and Brassey's Defence Yearbook ===
- 1974–1975 editorial board: S. W. B. Menaul, R. G. S. Bidwell, R. H. F. Cox
- 1976 editorial board: S. W. B. Menaul, A. E. Younger, R. H. F. Cox
- 1977–1979 editorial board: A. E. Younger, E. F. Gueritz, R. H. F. Cox
- 1980–1982 editorial board: E. F. Gueritz, Henry Stanhope, Jennifer Shaw
- 1983–1984 editorial board: Group Captain David Bolton RAF (rtd), Henry Stanhope, Jennifer Shaw
- 1985 editorial board: Group Captain David Bolton RAF (rtd), Henry Stanhope, Jennifer Shaw, Maj-Gen (rtd) A. J. Trythall. Editor: B. H. Reid
- 1986–88 ???
- 1989 editorial board: Group Captain David Bolton RAF (rtd), Group Captain G. Gilbert AFC RAF (rtd), Henry Stanhope, Jennifer Shaw, Maj-Gen (rtd) A. J. Trythall, Jonathan Eyal
- 1990 editorial board: Group Captain David Bolton RAF (rtd), Helen MacDonald, Henry Stanhope, Jennifer Shaw, Maj-Gen (rtd) A.J. Trythall, Jonathan Eyal
- 1991 editorial board: Group Captain David Bolton RAF (rtd), Henry Stanhope, Jennifer Shaw, Maj-Gen (rtd) A. J. Trythall, Jonathan Eyal
- 1992 editorial board: Group Captain David Bolton RAF (rtd), Jennifer Shaw, Maj-Gen (rtd) A. J. Trythall, Jonathan Eyal

== See also ==
- Brassey's Publishers Ltd : publisher associated with the annual
- Jane's Fighting Ships (originally Jane's All the World's Fighting Ships) : competing publication
- Combat Fleets of the World : competing publication
