= Earl Brassey =

Former title in the Peerage of the United Kingdom

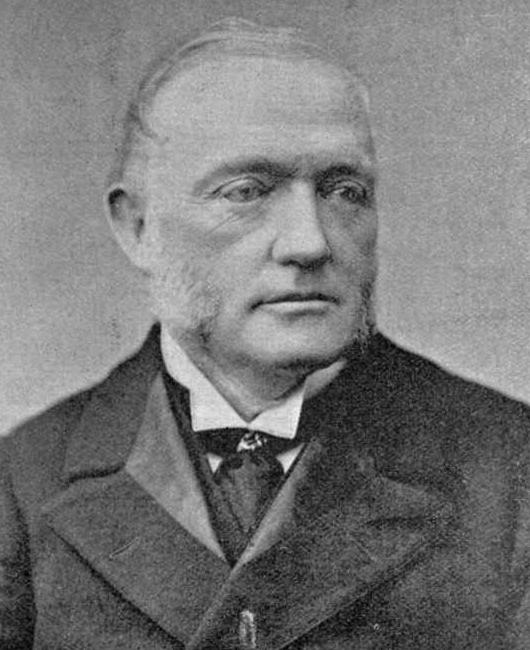
Thomas Brassey, 1st Earl Brassey

Arms of Brassey: Per fess indented sable and argent, in the first quarter a mallard of the second

Earl Brassey was a title in the Peerage of the United Kingdom. It was created in 1911 for the Liberal politician and former Governor of Victoria, Australia, Thomas Brassey, 1st Baron Brassey, eldest son of the railway magnate Thomas Brassey (1805–1870). He had already been created Baron Brassey, of Bulkeley in the County Palatine of Chester, in 1886, and was made Viscount Hythe, of Hythe in the County of Kent, at the same time as he was granted the earldom. These titles were also in the Peerage of the United Kingdom. The titles became extinct upon the death of his son, the second Earl, in 1919.

Henry Brassey, 1st Baron Brassey of Apethorpe, was the nephew of the first Earl.

== Baron Brassey (1886) ==
- Thomas Brassey, 1st Baron Brassey (1836–1918) (created Earl Brassey in 1911)

=== Earl Brassey (1911) ===
- Thomas Brassey, 1st Earl Brassey (1836–1918)
- Thomas Allnutt Brassey, 2nd Earl Brassey (1863–1919)

=== Title succession chart ===
Title succession chart, Barons Brassey, Earls Brassey, Brassey baronets and Barons Brassey of Apethorpe.

Thomas Brassey; 1793–1866
Baron Brassey; Earl Brassey
Thomas Brassey; 1st Earl Brassey; 1st Baron Brassey; 1836–1918	Henry Brassey; 1840–1891
Brassey baronets Baron Brassey of Apethorpe
Thomas Brassey; 2nd Earl Brassey; 1863–1919	Henry Brassey; 1st Baron Brassey of Apethorpe; 1st Baronet; 1870–1958
Barony and earldom extinct
Ronald Brassey; 1895–1895	Capt. Hon. Cecil Brassey; 1896–1949	Lt. Gerald Brassey; 1898–1918	John Brassey; 1903–1903	Bernard Brassey; 2nd Baron Brassey of Apethorpe; 1905–1967
David Brassey; 3rd Baron Brassey of Apethorpe; 1932–2015
Edward Brassey; 4th Baron Brassey of Apethorpe born 1964
Hon. Christian Brassey born 2003

== See also ==
- Baron Brassey of Apethorpe
