= Thomas Brassey, 2nd Earl Brassey =

British noble

The Right Honourable The Earl Brassey TD DL JP
- Thomas Brassey

Member of the House of Lords
- Lord Temporal
- In office 23 February 1918 – 12 November 1919
- Preceded by: Thomas Brassey, 1st Earl Brassey
- Succeeded by: Peerage extinct

Personal details
- Born: Thomas Allnutt Brassey; 7 March 1863
- Died: 12 November 1919 (aged 56)

Thomas Allnutt Brassey, 2nd Earl Brassey (7 March 1863 – 12 November 1919), styled Viscount Hythe between 1911 and 1918, was a British peer, who was for many years editor or joint editor of The Naval Annual.

== Early life ==
Brassey was the only son of Thomas Brassey, 1st Earl Brassey, by his first wife Anna (née Allnutt), daughter of John Allnutt. He was educated at Eton and Balliol College, Oxford.

== Career ==
Brassey was an honorary Lieutenant in the London Brigade of Royal Naval Artillery Volunteers from 1888 to 1892. He acted as Assistant Private Secretary to Earl Spencer during the time the latter was First Lord of the Admiralty (1892–1895), and in 1894 was Assistant Secretary of the Royal Commission on Opium that his father chaired.

Brassey was appointed a captain in the Queen's Own West Kent Yeomanry on 19 January 1898. After the outbreak of the Second Boer War in late 1899, Brassey volunteered for active service with the Imperial Yeomanry, and was commissioned Captain of the 69 (Sussex) Company on 28 March 1900. He left Southampton for South Africa in early April 1900 on the SS Carisbrooke Castle, accompanied by his wife. While in South Africa he served as acting Civil Commissioner for the British government at Pretoria in 1901, following its surrender by the Boers the previous year.

He later became Lieutenant-Colonel in command of the West Kent Yeomanry in 1910, retiring in May 1914. He was awarded the TD in 1909. After the outbreak of the First World War he raised a second battalion to this regiment for home service, which he commanded until 1916, remaining on the Territorial Force Reserve. He was also attached to the Royal Engineers Transport Staff and his service entitled him to two campaign medals, but the location of the qualifying service is not given.

He was editor of The Naval Annual from 1892 to 1899 and then either alone or jointly with John Leyland editor from 1902 to 1914, and finally in 1919.

He stood unsuccessfully for election to Parliament as Liberal candidate for Epsom in 1892, and for Christchurch in 1895 and 1900. In the latter year's general election, he fought against Kenneth Balfour, and after a close and disputed result, the two men gave their names to adjoining roads in the constituency. He made a further unsuccessful attempt to stand for election at Devonport in 1902. He was Mayor of Bexhill-on-Sea in 1909 and served as a Deputy Lieutenant and Justice of the Peace for Sussex. He was active in promoting a renewed Imperial Federation League.

He was elected a Fellow of the Royal Statistical Society in February 1903.

Brassey was managing director of lead mining and smelting companies in mainland Italy and Sardinia, such as the mine in Ingurtosu, a hamlet belonging to Arbus, Sardinia.

He was Knight of Grace of the Order of St John of Jerusalem and Commander of the Order of the Crown of Italy.

== Personal life ==
Lord Brassey married Lady Idina Mary Nevill, daughter of William Nevill, 1st Marquess of Abergavenny, on 28 February 1889. They had no children. He succeeded to his father's title in 1918, enabling him to sit in the House of Lords. He died childless in November the following year, aged 56, after being hit by a taxi, when the titles became extinct. He was buried in Catsfield, Sussex. The Countess Brassey died in February 1951, aged 85.

=== Death and estate ===
Brassey died on 12 November 1919 at 32 Ashley Gardens, Westminster, from injuries sustained by being hit by a taxi, leaving an estate valued at £845,033 13s. 10d., with net personalty of £651,865 11s. 4d. His will, dated 15 February 1918 with two codicils, appointed as executors his widow Idina Mary, Countess Brassey, his nephew Hugh Sydney Egerton of Mountfield Court, Granville Charles Gresham Leveson Gower of Titsey Place, and the solicitor Francis Edward James Smith of Lincoln’s Inn Fields.

Brassey left several charitable bequests, including £5,000 to the Trustees’ Fund for the benefit of the Bodleian Library, and £1,000 each to Oxford House, Bethnal Green, and the East Sussex Hospital, St Leonards, all payable within five years at the discretion of his executors.

He made a number of legacies to household and estate staff: £200 to his housekeeper Annie Blunden, £100 each to his bailiff Thomas Wait and his gardener Ernest Edward, £10 to indoor and outdoor servants with twenty years' service, and three months’ wages to employees with at least five years’ service.

Private bequests included £5,000, motor cars, and household effects valued at a further £5,000 to his wife, together with the life use of Park Gate and a jointure ensuring her total income would be £5,000 per annum free of tax. £1,000 was left to Leveson Gower as executor.

Further pecuniary legacies payable within three years of his death included:

- £5,000 each to his sisters Lady Mabelle Annie Egerton and Muriel Agnes, Countess De La Warr
- £3,000 to his nephew Foulke Myddleton
- £2,000 each to his nieces Phyllis Egerton, Joan Egerton, and Mrs Louise Mary Seymour
- £1,000 each to Mrs Constance Follett, Major Harold Goodlee Ruggles-Brise, and Miss Florence Ruggles-Brise
- £500 to Miss Maud Robinson

He also bequeathed 8,000 one-dollar shares in the Michigan Land and Iron Company to his nephew Sydney Hugh Egerton, and 6,000 shares to be divided between Viscount Buckhurst (his nephew), the two sons of his sister Lady Egerton, and the son of his sister Lady Willingdon. Additional corporate holdings included 2,000 preference shares in Pentulosa Ltd. to his wife, and 1,000 shares each to Foulke Myddleton and Miss Florence Paget.

Brassey left the effects at Normanhurst not considered heirlooms to the first life tenant. His remaining real and personal estate was placed in trust for Sydney Hugh Egerton and his heirs male in tail.

== Footnotes ==
Peerage of the United Kingdom
Preceded by Thomas Brassey	Earl Brassey; 1918–1919; Member of the House of Lords (1918–1919)	Extinct
Preceded by Thomas Brassey	Baron Brassey; 1918–1919	Extinct
