= Mabelle Egerton =

English noblewoman and charity worker (1865-1927)

Lady Mabelle Egerton CBE (1865-1927) was an English noblewoman and charity worker best known for running a canteen for soldiers during World War I.

== Early life ==
Illustration from Around the World in the yacht Sunbeam, which shows Mabelle being swept overboard

She was born Mabelle Brassey, the eldest daughter of Thomas Brassey, 1st Earl Brassey and Baroness Anna Brassey, a writer and naturalist whose geology collection Mabelle donated to the Bexhill Museum after her death. In 1876, when Mabelle was twelve years old, the family set out on a world tour on their yacht, the Sunbeam, visiting Madeira, Tenerife, Cape Verde, Tahiti, Hawaii, Japan, China and the East Indies before returning to England in 1877. Anna Brassey published an account of this voyage in which she describes Mabelle and Captain Lecky being washed overboard and saved by Captain Lecky's holding onto a rope.

In 1888, Mabelle married Charles Augustus Egerton of Mountfield Court. They had four sons and three daughters. Her husband died in 1912.

== World War I ==
During World War I, Lady Mabelle and her father travelled to Rouen to deliver supplies for the Red Cross and St John's Ambulance. When she discovered that the soldiers could not get hot water to make tea and coffee, she set up the Rouen Station Coffee Shop, which opened in December 1916. The shop offered round-the-clock refreshments for sale to able-bodied servicemen, using the profits to supply wounded soldiers for free. Lady Mabelle also supplied parcels containing food for two days and sold supplies and toiletries. As the shop expanded to become one of the largest canteens in France, Lady Mabelle oversaw a staff of thirty English women volunteers and served thousands of people per day. Soldiers' accounts remember the shop as an impressively well-run operation and one of the last outposts of homeliness before the front lines. Lady Mabelle was appointed Commander of the British Empire in recognition of her service in the 1918 New Year Honours.

== Other causes and legacy ==
Mountfield Village Hall in East Sussex is dedicated to Lady Mabelle Egerton

Lady Mabelle patronised nursing and midwifery organisations, including serving as Hon. Secretary of the East Sussex County Nursing Association. She was appointed Lady of Justice in the Order of St John of Jerusalem.

Lady Mabelle died in 1927. Mountfield Village Hall in East Sussex, which was built the next year, is dedicated to her, and a fund in her name was established to fund nurse's training at Plaistow Hospital.
