= Thomas Brassey =

British engineering contractor (1805–1870)

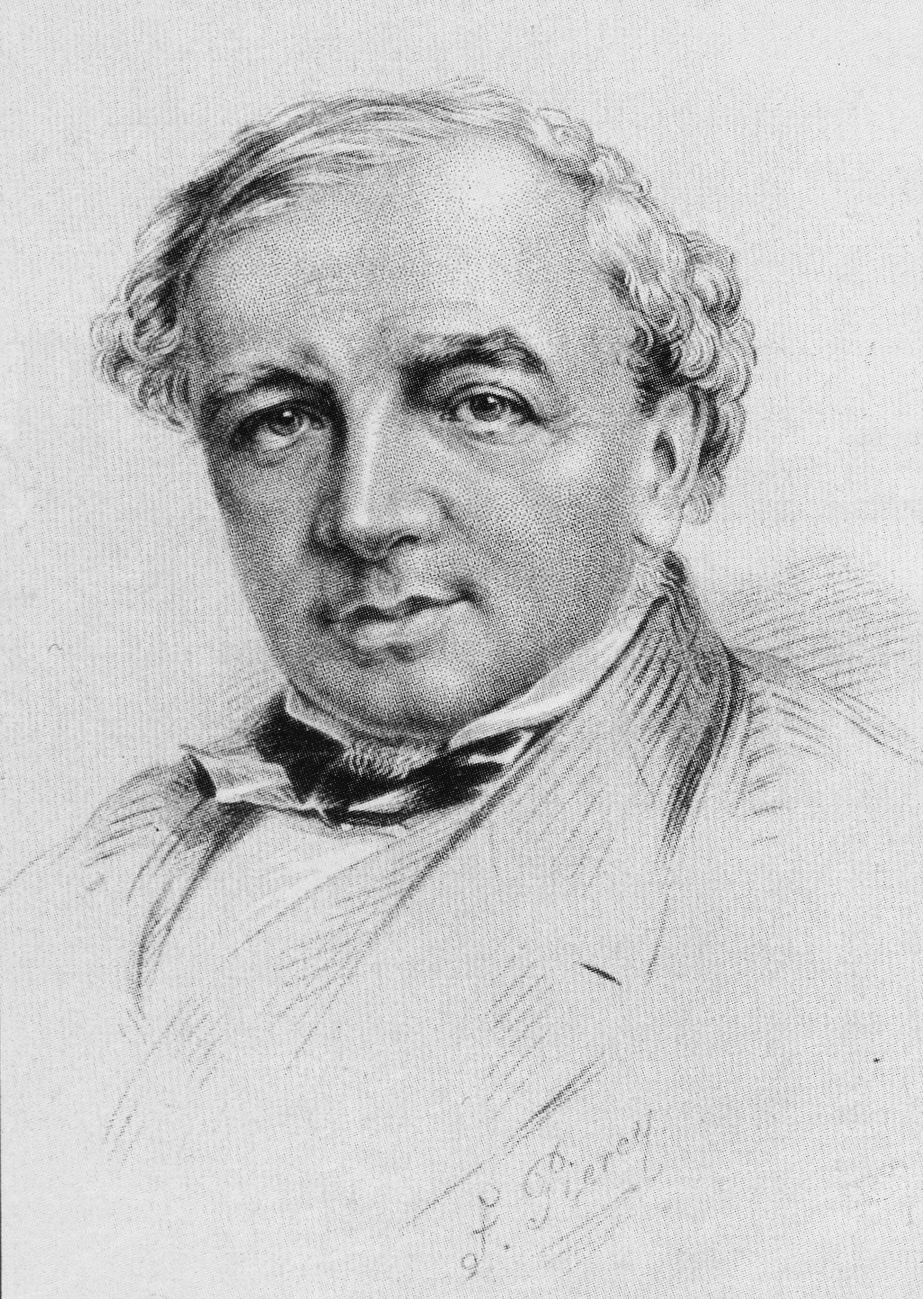
- Brassey by Frederick Piercy, 1850
- Born: 7 November 1805; Buerton, Chester, England
- Died: 8 December 1870 (aged 65); St Leonards-on-Sea, East Sussex, England
- Occupation: Civil engineering contractor
- Spouse: Maria Harrison (m. 1831)
- Children: Thomas; Harry; Albert
- Parents: John Brassey (father); Elizabeth Brassey (mother)

Thomas Brassey (7 November 1805 – 8 December 1870) was an English civil engineering contractor and manufacturer of building materials who was responsible for building much of the world's railways in the 19th century. By 1847, he had built about one-third of the railways in Britain, and by time of his death in 1870 he had built one in every twenty miles of railway in the world. This included three-quarters of the lines in France, major lines in many other European countries and in Canada, Australia, South America and India. He also built the structures associated with those railways, including docks, bridges, viaducts, stations, tunnels and drainage works.

As well as railway engineering, Brassey was active in the development of steamships, mines, locomotive factories, marine telegraphy, and water supply and sewage systems. He built part of the London sewerage system, still in operation today, and was a major shareholder in Brunel's The Great Eastern, the only ship large enough at the time to lay the first transatlantic telegraph cable across the North Atlantic, in 1864. He left a fortune of over £5 million, equivalent to about £760 million in 2025.

== Background ==
Thomas Brassey was the eldest son of John Brassey, a prosperous farmer, and his wife Elizabeth, and member of a Brassey family that had been living at Manor Farm in Buerton, a small settlement in the parish of Aldford, 6 miles (10 km) south of Chester, from at least 1663.

== Early years ==
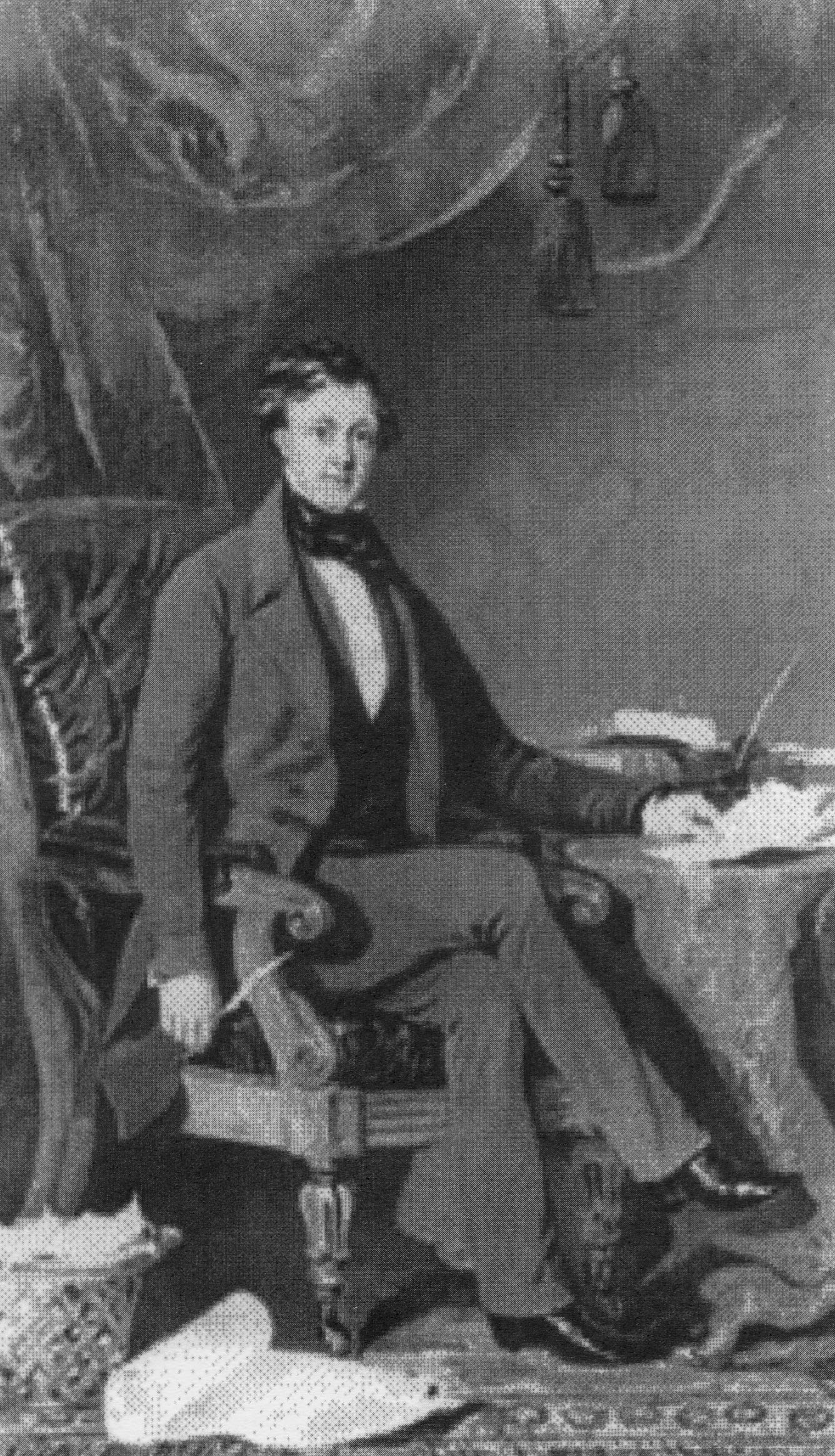
Thomas Brassey in 1830

Thomas Brassey was educated at home until the age of 12, when he was sent to The King's School in Chester. Aged 16, he became an articled apprentice to a land surveyor and agent, William Lawton. Lawton was the agent of Francis Richard Price of Overton, Flintshire. During the time Brassey was an apprentice, he helped to survey the new Shrewsbury to Holyhead road (this is now the A5), assisting the surveyor of the road. While he was engaged in this work, he met the engineer for the road, Thomas Telford. When his apprenticeship ended at the age of 21, Brassey was taken into partnership by Lawton, forming the firm of "Lawton and Brassey". Brassey moved to Birkenhead where their business was established. Birkenhead at that time was a very small place; in 1818, it consisted of only four houses. The business flourished and grew, extending into areas beyond land surveying. At the Birkenhead site, a brickworks and lime kilns were built. The business either owned or managed sand and stone quarries in Wirral. Amongst other ventures, the firm supplied the bricks for building the custom house for the port which was developing in the town. Many of the bricks needed for the growing city of Liverpool were supplied by the brickworks, and Brassey devised new methods of transporting his materials, including a system similar to the modern method of palletting and using a gravity train to take materials from the quarry to the port. When Lawton died, Brassey became sole manager of the company and sole agent and representative for Francis Price. It was during these years that he gained the basic experience for his future career.

== Early contracts in Britain ==
Brassey's first experiences of civil engineering were the construction of 4 miles (6 km) of the New Chester Road at Bromborough, and the building of a bridge at Saughall Massie, on the Wirral. During that time, he met George Stephenson, who needed stone to build the Sankey Viaduct on the Liverpool and Manchester Railway. Stephenson and Brassey visited a quarry in Storeton, a village near Birkenhead, following which Stephenson advised Brassey to become involved in building railways. Brassey's first venture into railways was to submit a tender for building the Dutton Viaduct on the Grand Junction Railway, but he lost the contract to William Mackenzie, who had submitted a lower bid. In 1835, Brassey submitted a tender for building the Penkridge Viaduct, further south on the same railway, between Stafford and Wolverhampton, together with 10 miles (16 km) of track. The tender was accepted, the work was successfully completed, and the viaduct opened in 1837. Initially, the engineer for the line was George Stephenson, but he was replaced by Joseph Locke, Stephenson's pupil and assistant. During this time, Brassey moved to Stafford. Penkridge Viaduct still stands and carries trains on the West Coast Main Line.

On completion of the Grand Junction Railway, Locke moved on to design part of the London and Southampton Railway and encouraged Brassey to submit a tender, which was accepted. Brassey undertook work on the section of the railway between Basingstoke and Winchester, and on other parts of the line. The following year, Brassey won contracts to build the Chester and Crewe Railway with Robert Stephenson as engineer and, with Locke as the engineer, the Glasgow, Paisley and Greenock Railway and the Sheffield and Manchester Railway.

== Early contracts in France ==
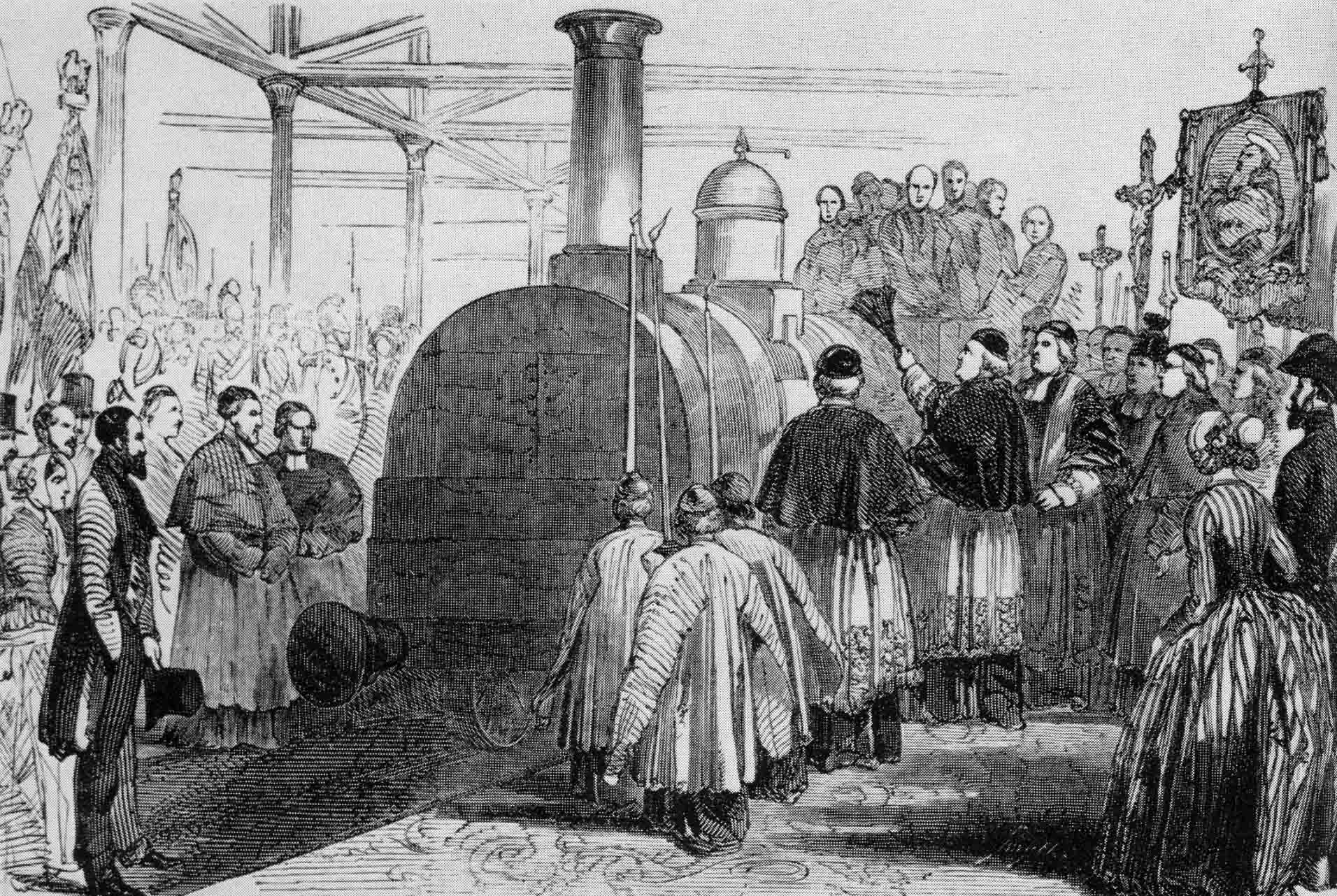
Opening ceremony of the Rouen and Le Havre Railway in 1844

Following the success of the early railways in Britain, the French were encouraged to develop a railway network, in the first place to link with the railway system in Britain. To this end, the Paris and Rouen Railway Company was established, and Locke was appointed as its engineer. He considered that the tenders submitted by French contractors were too expensive, and suggested that British contractors should be invited to tender. In the event, only two British contractors took the offer seriously, Brassey and William Mackenzie. Instead of trying to outbid each other, they tendered jointly, and their tender was accepted in 1841. This set a pattern for Brassey, who from then on worked in partnership with other contractors in most of his ventures. Between 1841 and 1844, Brassey and Mackenzie won contracts to build four French railways, with a total mileage of 437 miles (703 km), the longest of which was the 294-mile (473 km) Orléans and Bordeaux Railway. Following the French revolution of 1848, there was a financial crisis in the country and investment in the railways almost ceased. This meant that Brassey had to seek foreign contracts elsewhere.

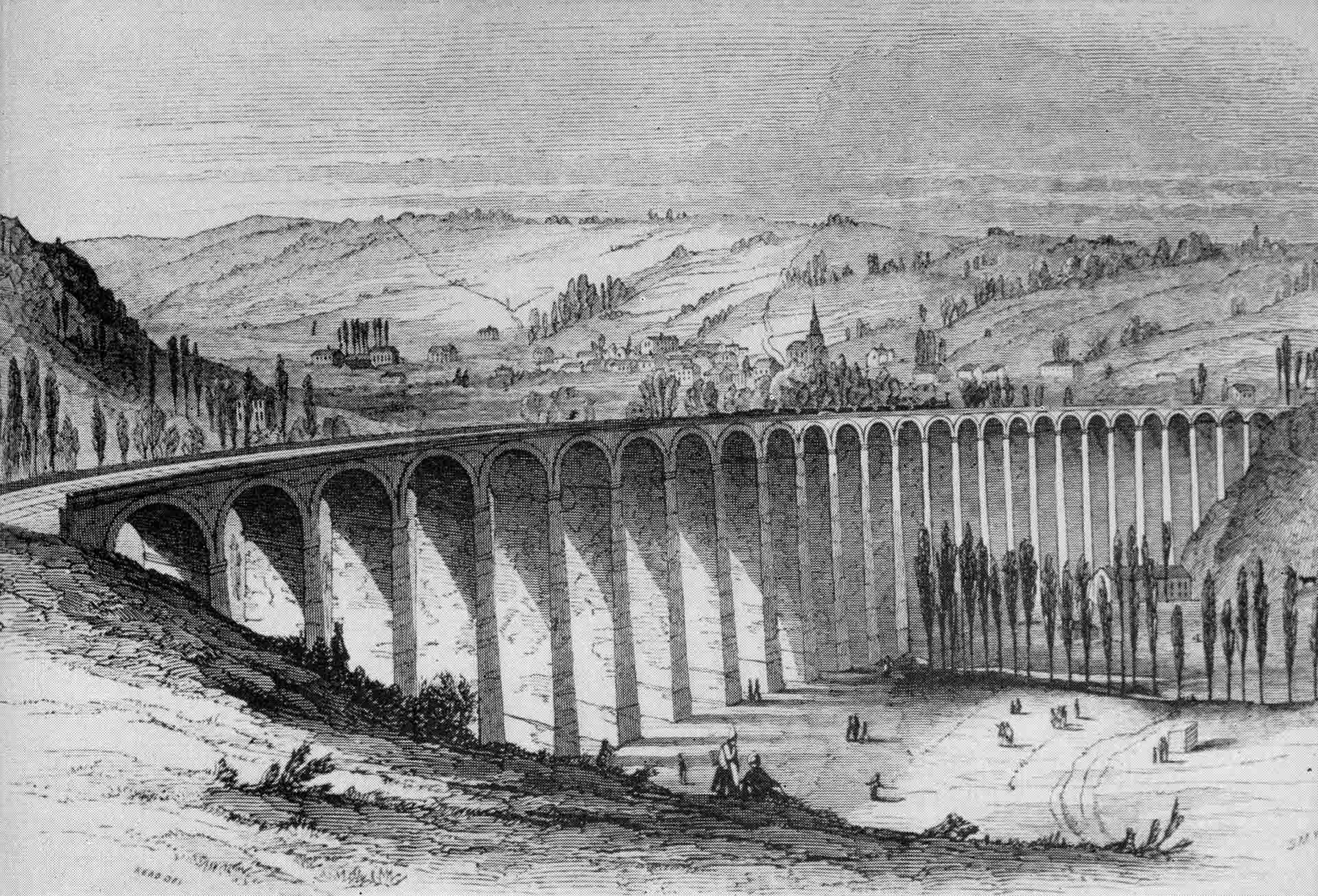
Barentin Viaduct after rebuilding

=== The collapse of the Barentin Viaduct ===
In January 1846, during the building of the 58-mile (93 km) long Rouen and Le Havre line, one of the few major structural disasters of Brassey's career occurred, the collapse of the Barentin Viaduct. The viaduct was built of brick at a cost of about £50,000 and was 100 feet (30 m) high. The reason for the collapse was never established, but a possible cause was the nature of the lime used to make the mortar. The contract stipulated that this had to be obtained locally, and the collapse occurred after a few days of heavy rain. Brassey rebuilt the viaduct at his own expense, this time using lime of his own choice. The rebuilt viaduct still stands and is in use today.

== "Railway mania" ==
During the time Brassey was building the early French railways, Britain was experiencing what was known as the "railway mania", when there was massive investment in the railways. Large numbers of lines were being built, but not all of them were built to Brassey's high standards. Brassey was involved in this expansion but was careful to choose his contracts and investors so that he could maintain his standards. During the one year of 1845 he agreed to no less than nine contracts in England, Scotland and Wales, with a mileage totalling over 340 miles (547 km). In 1844 Brassey and Locke began building the Lancaster and Carlisle Railway of 70 miles (113 km), which was considered to be one of their greatest lines. It passed through the Lune Valley and then over Shap Fell. Its summit was 916 feet (279 m) high and the line had steep gradients, the maximum being 1 in 75. To the south the line linked by way of the Preston–Lancaster line to the Grand Junction Railway. Two important contracts undertaken in 1845 were the Trent Valley Railway of 50 miles (80 km) and the Chester and Holyhead line of 84 miles (135 km). The former line joined the London and Birmingham Railway at Rugby to the Grand Junction Railway south of Stafford providing a line from London to Scotland which bypassed Birmingham. The latter line provided a link between London and the ferries sailing from Holyhead to Ireland and included Robert Stephenson's tubular Britannia Bridge over the Menai Strait. Also in 1845 Brassey received contracts for the Caledonian Railway which linked the railway at Carlisle with Glasgow and Edinburgh, covering a total distance of 125 miles (201 km) and passing over Beattock Summit. His engineer on this project was George Heald. That same year he also began contracts for other railways in Scotland, and in 1846 he started building parts of the Lancashire and Yorkshire Railway between Hull and Liverpool, across the Pennines.

A contract for the Great Northern Railway was agreed in 1847, with William Cubitt as engineer-in-chief, although much of the work was done by William's son Joseph, who was the resident engineer. Brassey was the sole contractor for the line of 75.5 miles (122 km). A particular problem was met in the marshy country of The Fens in providing a firm foundation for the railway and associated structures. Brassey was assisted in solving the problem by one of his agents, Stephen Ballard. Rafts or platforms were made of layers of faggot-wood and peat sods. As these sank, they dispersed the water and so a firm foundation was made. This line is still in use and forms part of the East Coast Main Line. Also in 1847 Brassey began to build the North Staffordshire Railway. By this time the "railway mania" was coming to an end and contracts in Britain were becoming increasingly more difficult to find. By the end of the "railway mania", Brassey had built one-third of all the railways in Britain.

== Expansion in Europe ==
Following the end of the "railway mania" and the drying up of contracts in France, Brassey could have retired as a rich man. Instead he decided to expand his interests, initially in other European countries. His first venture in Spain was the Barcelona and Mataró Railway of 18 miles (29 km) in 1848. In 1850 he undertook his first contract in the Italian States, a short railway of 10 miles (16 km), the Prato and Pistoia Railway. This was to lead to bigger contracts in Italy, the next being the Turin–Novara line of 60 miles (97 km) in 1853, followed by the Central Italian Railway of 52 miles (84 km). In Norway, with Sir Morton Peto and Edward Betts, Brassey built the Oslo to Bergen Railway of 56 miles (90 km) which passes through inhospitable terrain and rises to nearly 6,000 feet (1,829 m). In 1852 he resumed work in France with the Mantes and Caen Railway of 133 miles (214 km) and, in 1854, the Caen and Cherbourg Railway of 94 miles (151 km). The Dutch were relatively slow to start building railways but in 1852 with Locke as engineer, Brassey built the Dutch Rhenish Railway of 43 miles (69 km). Meanwhile, he continued to build lines in England, including the Shrewsbury and Hereford Railway of 51 miles (82 km), the Hereford, Ross and Gloucester Railway of 50 miles (80 km), the London, Tilbury and Southend Railway of 50 miles (80 km) and the North Devon Railway from Crediton to Barnstaple of 47 miles (76 km).

== The Grand Trunk Railway of Canada ==
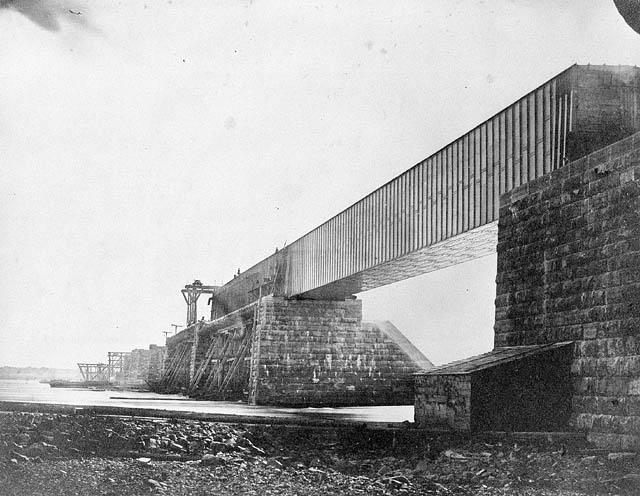
Victoria Bridge under construction

In 1852 Brassey took out the largest contract of his career, which was to build the Grand Trunk Railway of Canada. This line passed from Quebec, along the valley of the Saint Lawrence River, and then to the north of Lake Ontario to Toronto. The line totalled 539 miles (867 km) in length. The consulting engineer for the project was Robert Stephenson and the company's engineer for the whole undertaking was Alexander Ross. Brassey worked in partnership with Peto, Betts and Sir William Jackson. The line crossed the river at Montreal by the Victoria Bridge. This was a tubular bridge designed by Robert Stephenson and was the longest bridge in the world at the time, measuring some 1.75 miles (3 km). The bridge opened in 1859 and the formal opening ceremony was carried out the following year by the Prince of Wales. The construction of the line caused considerable problems. The main problem was the raising of the necessary finance and at one stage Brassey travelled to Canada to appeal personally for assistance. Other difficulties arose from the severity of the Canadian winter, the waterways being frozen for around six months each year, and resistance from Canadian businessmen. The line was an engineering success but a financial failure, with the contractors losing £1 million.

=== The Canada Works ===
The contract for the Grand Trunk Railway included all the materials required for building the bridge and the railway, including the rolling stock. To manufacture the metallic components, Brassey built a new factory in Birkenhead which he called The Canada Works. A suitable site was found by George Harrison, Brassey's brother-in-law, and the factory was built with a quay alongside to take ocean-going ships. The works was managed by George Harrison with a Mr. Alexander and William Heap as assistants. The machine shop was 900 feet (274 m) in length and included a blacksmiths' shop with 40 furnaces, anvils and steam hammers, a coppersmiths' shop, and fabrication, woodwork and pattern shops. There was also a well-stocked library and a reading room for all the workforce.

The fitting shop was designed to manufacture 40 locomotives a year and a total of 300 were produced in the next eight years. The first locomotive, given its trial in May 1854, was named Lady Elgin, after the wife of the Governor General of Canada of the time, the Earl of Elgin. For the bridge hundreds of thousands of components were required and all were manufactured in Birkenhead or in other English factories to Brassey's specifications. These were all stamped and coded, loaded into ships to be taken to Quebec and then by rail to the site of the bridge for assembly. The central tube of the bridge contained over 10,000 pieces of iron, perforated by holes for half a million rivets, and when it was assembled every piece and hole was true.

== The Grand Crimean Central Railway ==
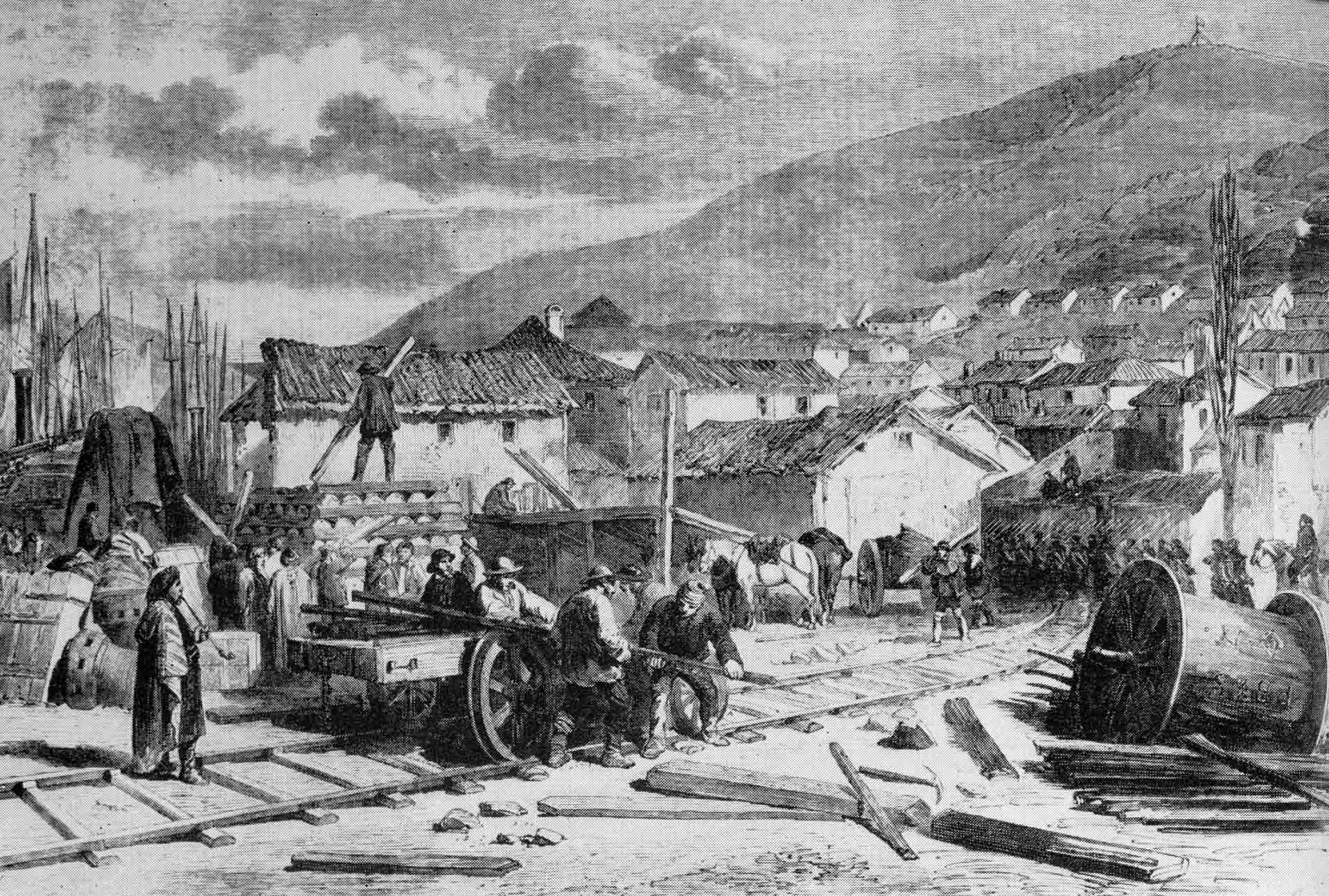
Navvies working on the railway in 1854

Brassey played a part in helping the British forces to success in the Crimean War. The Black Sea port of Sevastopol was held by the Russians. The British government, in alliance with the French and the Turks, sent an army of 30,000 to Balaclava, another port in a neighbouring bay of the Black Sea, from which to attack Sevastopol. Sevastopol was besieged in September 1854 by the British and allied forces. It was hoped that the siege would be short but with the coming of winter the conditions were appalling and it was proving difficult to transport clothing, food, medical supplies and weaponry from Balaclava to the front. When news of the problem arrived in Britain, Brassey joined with Peto and Betts in offering to build a railway at cost to transport these necessary supplies. They shipped out the equipment and materials for building the railway, which had been intended for other undertakings, together with an army of navvies to carry out the work. Within seven weeks, in severe winter conditions, the railway from Balaclava to the troops besieging Sevastopol was completed. It then became possible to move supplies easily to the front and Sevastopol was finally taken in September 1855.

== Worldwide expansion ==
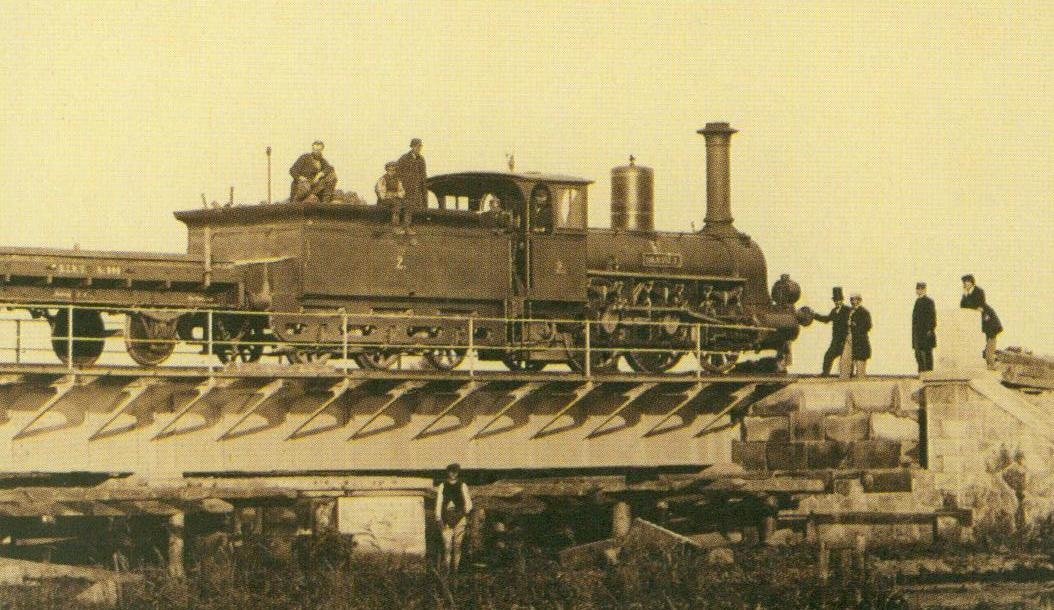
Brassey Steam Engine on the Warsaw–Terespol Railway, 1866

In addition to building more railways in Britain and in other European countries, Brassey undertook contracts in other continents. In South America his railways totalled 250 miles (402 km), in Australia 132 miles (212 km), and in India and Nepal 506 miles (814 km).

In 1866 there was a great economic slump, caused by the collapse of the bank of Overend, Gurney and Company, and many of Brassey's colleagues and competitors became insolvent. However, despite setbacks, Brassey survived the crisis and drove ahead with the projects he already had in hand. These included the Lemberg (now Lviv) and Czernowicz (now Chernivtsi) Railway in Galicia (part of Austrian Empire) which continued to be constructed despite the Austro-Prussian War which was taking place in the locality.

From 1867 Brassey's health was beginning to decline, but he continued to negotiate further contracts, including the Czernowicz and Suczawa Railway in the Austrian Empire. In 1868 he suffered a mild stroke but he continued to work and in April 1869 he embarked on an extensive tour of over 5,000 miles (8,000 km) in Eastern Europe. By the time of his death he had built one mile in every twenty miles of railway in the world.

== Non-railway contracts ==
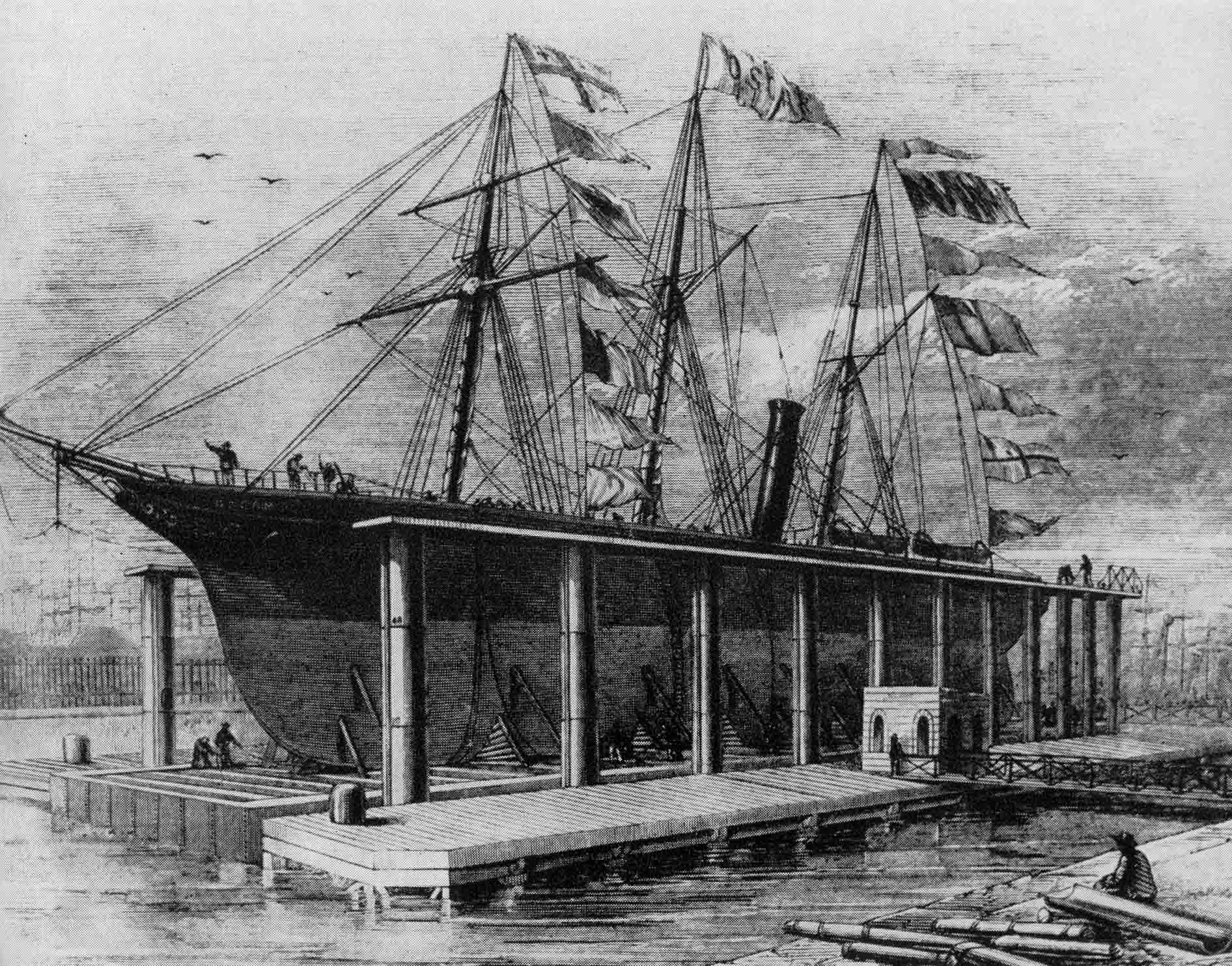
Victoria Dock showing the hydraulic lift

Brassey's works were not limited to railways and associated structures. In addition to his factories in Birkenhead, he built an engineering works in France to supply materials for his contracts there. He built a number of drainage systems, and a waterworks at Calcutta. Brassey built docks at Greenock, Birkenhead, Barrow-in-Furness and London. His London docks were the Victoria Docks which had a water area of over 100 acres (40 ha). The contract for this was agreed in 1852 in partnership with Peto and Betts and the docks were opened in 1857. Also included in the contract were warehouses and wine vaults totalling an area of about 25 acres (10 ha). The dockside machinery was worked by hydraulic power supplied by William Armstrong. The dock had links to Brassey's London, Tilbury and Southend Railway and thereby to the entire British rail system.

In 1861 Brassey built part of the London sewerage system for Joseph Bazalgette. This was a stretch of the Metropolitan Mid Level Sewer of 12 miles (19 km) which started at Kensal Green, passed under Bayswater Road, Oxford Street and Clerkenwell to the River Lea. It was one of the earliest ventures to use steam cranes. The undertaking was considered to have been one of Brassey's most difficult. The sewer is still in operation today. He also worked with Bazalgette to build the Victoria Embankment on the north bank of the River Thames from Westminster Bridge to Blackfriars Bridge.

Brassey gave financial help to Brunel to build his ship Leviathan, which was later called Great Eastern and which in 1854 was six times larger than any other vessel in the world. Brassey was a major shareholder in the ship and after Brunel's death, he, together with Gooch and Barber, bought the ship for the purpose of laying the first Transatlantic telegraph cable across the North Atlantic in 1864.

Brassey had other ideas which were ahead of his time. He tried to interest the governments of the United Kingdom and Europe in the idea of a tunnel under the English Channel but this came to nothing. He also wanted to build a canal through the Isthmus of Darién (now the Isthmus of Panama) but this idea similarly had no success.

== Working methods ==
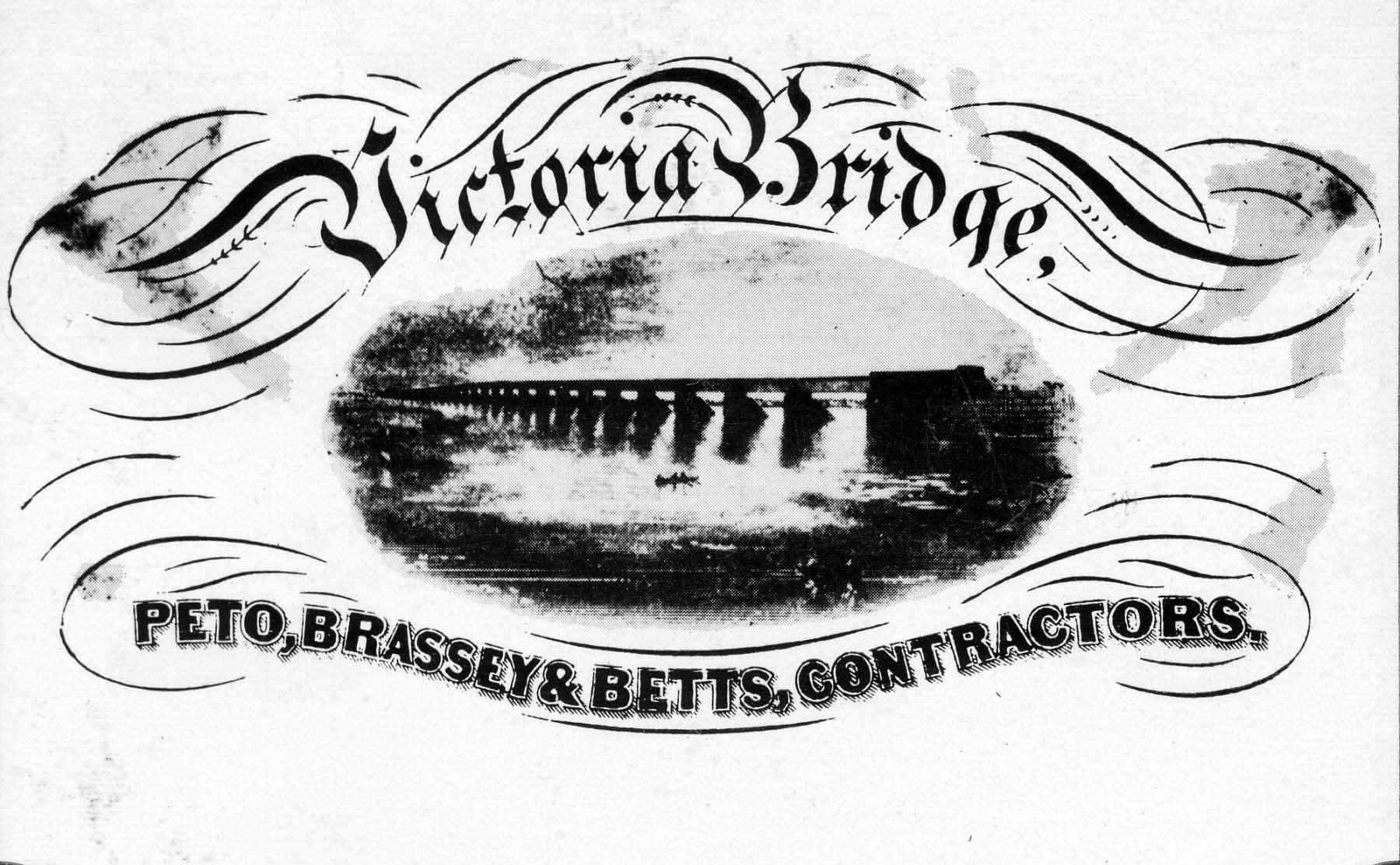
Handbill showing Victoria Bridge and the names of the partners

In most of Brassey's contracts he worked in partnership with other contractors, in particular with Peto and Betts. The planning of the details of the projects was done by the engineers. Sometimes there would be a consulting engineer and below him another engineer who was in charge of the day-to-day activities. During his career Brassey worked with many engineers, the most illustrious being Robert Stephenson, Joseph Locke and Isambard Kingdom Brunel. The day-to-day work was overseen by agents, who managed and controlled the activities of the subcontractors.

The actual work was done by labourers, in those days known as navvies, supervised by gangers (or foremen). In the early days the navvies were mainly English and many of them had formerly worked on building the canals. They were later joined by men from Scotland, Wales and Ireland. The number of Irish workers particularly increased following the Great Famine. Brassey paid his navvies and gangers a wage and provided food, clothing, shelter and, in some projects, a lending library. On overseas contracts local labour would be used if it were available, but the work was often done or supplemented by British workers. The agent on the site had overall responsibility for a project. He had to be a man of great capability, working for a fee plus a percentage of the profits, with penalties for late finishing and inducements to complete the work early.

Brassey had considerable skill in choosing good men to work in this way and in delegating the work. Having taken on a contract at an agreed price he would make a suitable sum of money available to the agent to meet the costs. If the agent were able to fulfil the work at a lower cost he could keep the remainder of the money. If unforeseen problems arose and these were reasonable, Brassey would cover these additional costs. He used hundreds of such agents. At the peak of his career, for well over 20 years, Brassey was employing on average some 80,000 people in many countries in four continents.

Despite this he had neither an office nor office staff, dealing with all the correspondence himself. Much of the detail of his works were held in his memory. He travelled with a personal valet and later had a cashier but all his letters were written by him; it is recorded that on one occasion after the rest of his party had gone to bed, 31 letters had been written by Brassey overnight. Although he won a large number of contracts, his bids were not always successful. It has been calculated that for every contract awarded, around six others had been unsuccessful.

Brassey was given a number of honours to celebrate his achievements, including the French Legion of Honour, the Italian Order of Saints Maurice and Lazarus and the Austrian Iron Crown (the first time this had been awarded to a foreigner).

== Marriage and children ==
In 1831 he married Maria Harrison, the second daughter of Joseph Harrison, a forwarding and shipping agent with whom he had come into contact during his early days in Birkenhead. Maria gave Thomas considerable support and encouragement throughout his career. She encouraged him to bid for the contract for Dutton Viaduct and, when that was unsuccessful, to apply for the next available contract. Thomas' work led to frequent moves of home in their early years; from Birkenhead to Stafford, Kingston upon Thames, Winchester and then Fareham. On each occasion Maria supervised the packing of their possessions and the removal. The Harrison children had been taught to speak French, while Thomas himself was unable to do so. Therefore, when the opportunity arose to apply for the French contracts, Maria was willing to act as interpreter and encouraged Thomas to bid for them. This resulted in moves to Vernon in Normandy, then to Rouen, on to Paris and back again to Rouen. Thomas refused to learn French and Maria acted as interpreter for all his French undertakings. Maria organised the education of their three sons. In time the family established a more-or-less permanent base in Lowndes Square, Belgravia, London. They had three surviving sons, who all gained distinction in their own right:

- Thomas Brassey, 1st Earl Brassey (1836–1918), eldest son, a Liberal Party Member of Parliament for Plymouth Devonport in Devon (1865) and for Hastings in Sussex (1868–86) who served as Governor of Victoria. He was elevated to the peerage in 1886 as Baron Brassey, "of Bulkeley in the County Palatine of Chester", and in 1911 was created Viscount Hythe, "of Hythe in the County of Kent" and Earl Brassey. His only son Thomas Brassey, 2nd Earl Brassey (1863–1919) died childless when all the titles became extinct.
- Henry Arthur Brassey (1840–1891) of Preston Hall, Aylesford, Kent, and of Bath House, Piccadilly, London, a Liberal Party Member of Parliament for Sandwich in Kent. He was the father of Henry Brassey, 1st Baron Brassey of Apethorpe, a Conservative politician, who was elevated to the House of Lords in 1938.
- Colonel Albert Brassey (1844–1918), a rower, soldier and Conservative Member of Parliament for Banbury 1895–1906.
- a fourth son who died in infancy.

== Later years ==
In 1870 Brassey was told that he had cancer but he continued to visit his working sites. One of his last visits was to the Wolverhampton and Walsall Railway, only a few miles from his first railway contract at Penkridge. In the late summer of 1870 he took to his bed at his home in St Leonards-on-Sea. There he was visited by members of his work force, not only his engineers and agents, but also his navvies, many of whom had walked for days to come and pay their respects.

When Brassey's business friend, Edward Betts, became insolvent in 1867, Brassey bought Betts' estate at Preston Hall, Aylesford in Kent on behalf of his second son, Henry.

In 1870 Brassey purchased Heythrop Park, a baroque house situated in an estate of 450 acres (1.8 km^{2}) 15 miles (24 km) northeast of Oxford as a wedding present for his third son, Albert.

On 8 December 1870 Thomas Brassey died from a brain haemorrhage in Victoria Hotel, St Leonards and was buried in the churchyard of St Laurence's Church, Catsfield, Sussex where a memorial stone has been erected. His estate was valued at £5,200,000 which consisted of "under £3,200,000 in UK" and "over £2,000,000" in a trust fund. The Oxford Dictionary of National Biography describes him as "one of the wealthiest of the self-made Victorians".

== Thomas Brassey, the man ==
It is not easy to be objective about the nature of Thomas Brassey's character because the earliest biography by Helps was commissioned by the Brassey family and the latest, rather short, biography was written by his great-great-grandson, Tom Stacey. There is virtually no remaining material of value to a biographer available today. There is no private correspondence, there are no diaries and none of his personal reminiscences.

Judging by his achievements alone, he must have been a remarkable man. He had enormous drive, an ability to remain calm despite enormous pressures, and extreme skill in organisation. He was a man of honour who always kept his word and his promise. He had no interest in public honours and refused invitations to stand for Parliament. Although he accepted honours from France, Italy and Austria, he mislaid the medals and had to request duplicates to please his wife. His great-great-grandson considers that he was successful because he inspired people rather than drove them.

Walker, in his 1969 biography, tried to make an accurate assessment of Brassey using Helps and other sources. He found it difficult to discover anyone who had a bad word to say about him, either during his life or since. Brassey expected a high standard of work from his employees; Cooke states that his "standards of quality were fastidious in the extreme". There can be no doubt about some of his qualities. He was exceptionally hardworking, and had an excellent memory and ability to perform mental arithmetic. He was a good judge of men, which enabled him to select the best people to be his agents. He was scrupulously fair with his subcontractors and kind to his navvies, supporting them financially at their times of need. He would at times undertake contracts of little benefit to himself to provide work for his navvies. The only faults which his eldest son could identify were a tendency to praise traits and actions of other people he would condemn in his own family, and an inability to refuse a request. No criticism of him could be found from the engineers with whom he worked, his business associates, his agents or his navvies. He paid his men fairly and generously.

The Oxford Dictionary of National Biography states "His greatest achievement was to raise the status of the civil engineering contractor to the eminence already attained in the mid-nineteenth century by the engineer". Walker regards him as "one of the giants of the nineteenth century".

== Commemorations ==
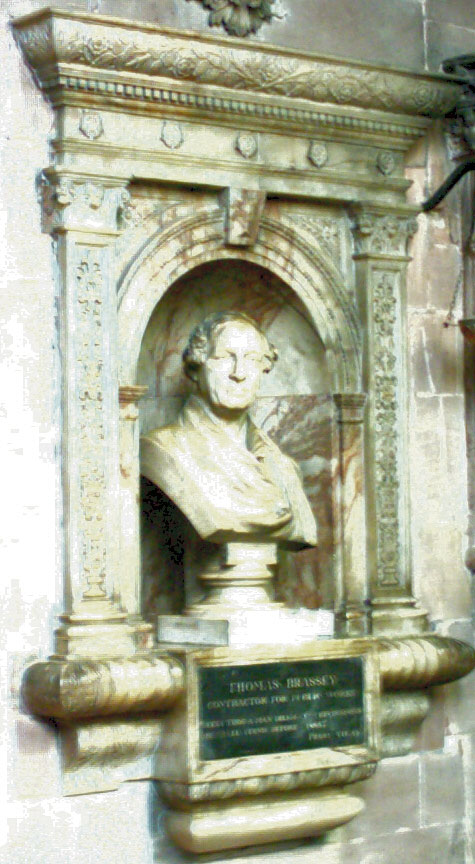
Bust of Thomas Brassey, Chester Cathedral

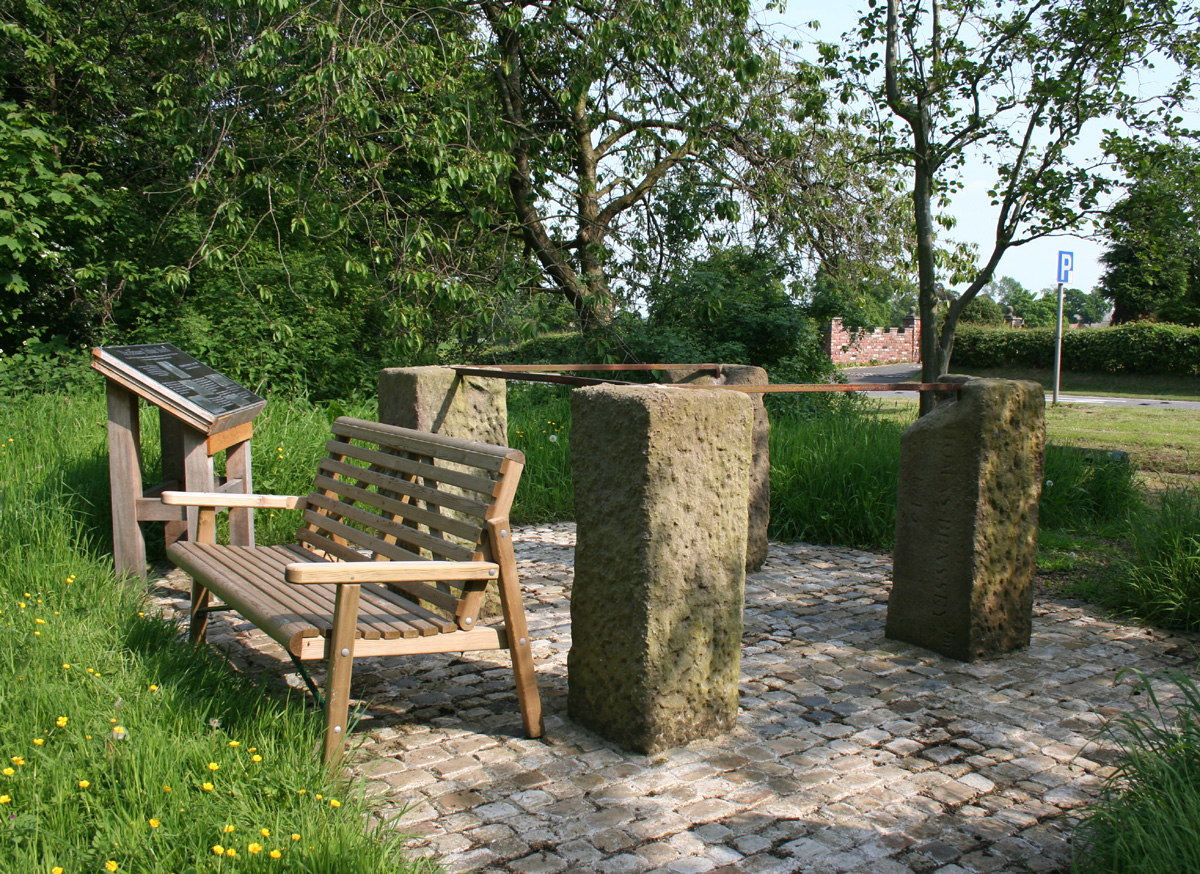
Brassey Tribute Stones, Bulkeley

None of his three sons became involved in their father's work and the business was wound up by administrators. The sons created a memorial to their parents in St Erasmus' Chapel in Chester cathedral. This consists of a backcloth to the altar inscribed to their parents' memory, and a bust of their father to the north of the altar. The memorial is by Sir Arthur Blomfield and the bust by M. Wagmiller. There is also a bust of Thomas in Chester's Grosvenor Museum and plaques to his memory in Chester station. Streets named after him in Chester are Brassey Street and Thomas Brassey Close (which is off Lightfoot Street). In Boughton, Chester, there are three street names in a row off Tarvin Road which spell 'Lord' 'Brassey' [of] 'Bulkeley'.

In November 2005, Penkridge celebrated the bicentenary of Brassey's birth and a special commemorative train was run from Chester to Holyhead. In January 2007, children from Overchurch Junior School in Upton, Wirral celebrated the life of Brassey. In April 2007 a plaque was placed on Brassey's first bridge at Saughall Massie. In the village of Bulkeley, near Malpas, Cheshire, is a tree called the 'Brassey Oak' on land once owned by the Brassey family. This was planted to celebrate Thomas' 40th birthday in 1845. It was surrounded by four inscribed sandstone pillars tied together by iron rails but due to the growth of the tree these burst and the stones fell. They were recovered and in 2007 were replaced in a more accessible place with an information board.

In 2019, a blue plaque was installed by Conservation Areas Wirral on the remaining structure of his Canada Works building in Beaufort Road, now part of the Wirral Waters area in Birkenhead.

== Statue ==
On 28 May 2025 the Thomas Brassey Society erected of a statue of Thomas Brassey outside Chester Railway Station. The statue was unveiled by Prince Richard, with the help of the local Girl Guides.

== See also ==
- List of structures built by Thomas Brassey.

== Further bibliography ==
- Faith, Nicholas (1990), The world the railways made, London: Bodley Head, ISBN 0-370-31299-6
- Joby, R. S (1983), The Railway Builders: Lives and Works of the Victorian Railway Contractors, Newton Abbot: David & Charles, ISBN 0-7153-7959-3
- Millar, John (1976), William Heap and his Company, West Kirby: William Millar, ISBN 0-9510965-1-6
