= Henry Brassey, 1st Baron Brassey of Apethorpe =

British politician

The Right Honourable The Lord Brassey of Apethorpe DL
- Baron Brassey in 1938

Member of the House of Lords
- Lord Temporal
- In office 5 February 1938 – 22 October 1958
- Preceded by: Peerage created
- Succeeded by: The 2nd Baron Brassey of Apethorpe

Personal details
- Born: Henry Leonard Campbell Brassey; 7 March 1870
- Died: 22 October 1958 (aged 88)
- Party: Conservative

Henry Leonard Campbell Brassey, 1st Baron Brassey of Apethorpe (7 March 1870 – 22 October 1958), known from 1922 to 1938 as Sir Henry Brassey, 1st Baronet, of Apethorpe Hall in Northamptonshire, was a British Conservative Party politician.

== Origins ==
He was the second but eldest surviving son of Henry Arthur Brassey (1840–1891) of Preston Hall, Aylesford, Kent, and of Bath House, Piccadilly, London, a Liberal Party Member of Parliament for Sandwich in Kent, the second son of the railway magnate Thomas Brassey (1805–1870) and a younger brother of Thomas Brassey, 1st Earl Brassey (1836–1918). His mother was Anna Harriet Stevenson (d. 1898), a daughter of Major George Robert Stevenson of Tongswood, Hawkhurst, Kent.

== Career ==
In 1904 he purchased Apethorpe Hall near the City of Peterborough in Northamptonshire, which he made his seat. He was elected to the House of Commons for Northamptonshire North in 1910, a seat he held until 1918, and then represented Peterborough between 1918 and 1929. Brassey fought in the First World War, achieving the rank of major in the Northamptonshire Yeomanry and in the West Kent Yeomanry. He also served as a Justice of the Peace for Northamptonshire and for Kent, as High Sheriff of Northamptonshire in 1907 and as a Deputy Lieutenant of Northamptonshire. In 1922 he was created a Baronet, "of Apethorpe in the County of Northampton", and in 1938 he was further honoured when he was raised to the peerage as Baron Brassey of Apethorpe "of Apethorpe in the County of Northampton". (Note: His uncle the 1st Earl Brassey had firstly in 1886 been created Baron Brassey, "of Bulkeley in the County Palatine of Chester", but all his titles had become extinct in 1919 on the death of his childless son, the 2nd Earl.)

== Marriage and children ==
In 1894 he married Lady Violet Mary Gordon-Lennox (1874–1946), a daughter of Charles Gordon-Lennox, 7th Duke of Richmond, by whom he had six sons, two of whom died as infants and a further two predeceased their father. His issue included:

- Bernard Thomas Brassey, 2nd Baron Brassey of Apethorpe (1905–1967), 5th and eldest surviving son and heir.

== Death ==
Brassey died in October 1958, aged 88, and was succeeded in his titles by his fifth but eldest surviving son Bernard Thomas Brassey, 2nd Baron Brassey of Apethorpe (1905–1967).

== Notes ==
Parliament of the United Kingdom
Preceded by George Nicholls	Member of Parliament for Northamptonshire North; January 1910 – 1918	Constituency abolished
Preceded by Sir George Greenwood	Member of Parliament for Peterborough; 1918–1929	Succeeded by J. F. Horrabin
Peerage of the United Kingdom
New creation	Baron Brassey of Apethorpe; 1938–1958; Member of the House of Lords (1938–1958)	Succeeded by Bernard Brassey
Baronetage of the United Kingdom
New creation	Baronet of Apethorpe; 1922–1958	Succeeded by Bernard Brassey
