= John Allnutt =

British wine merchant and art collector

John Allnutt (1773–1863), was a British wine merchant and art collector. Allnutt was a patron of John Constable, J. M. W. Turner and Thomas Lawrence.

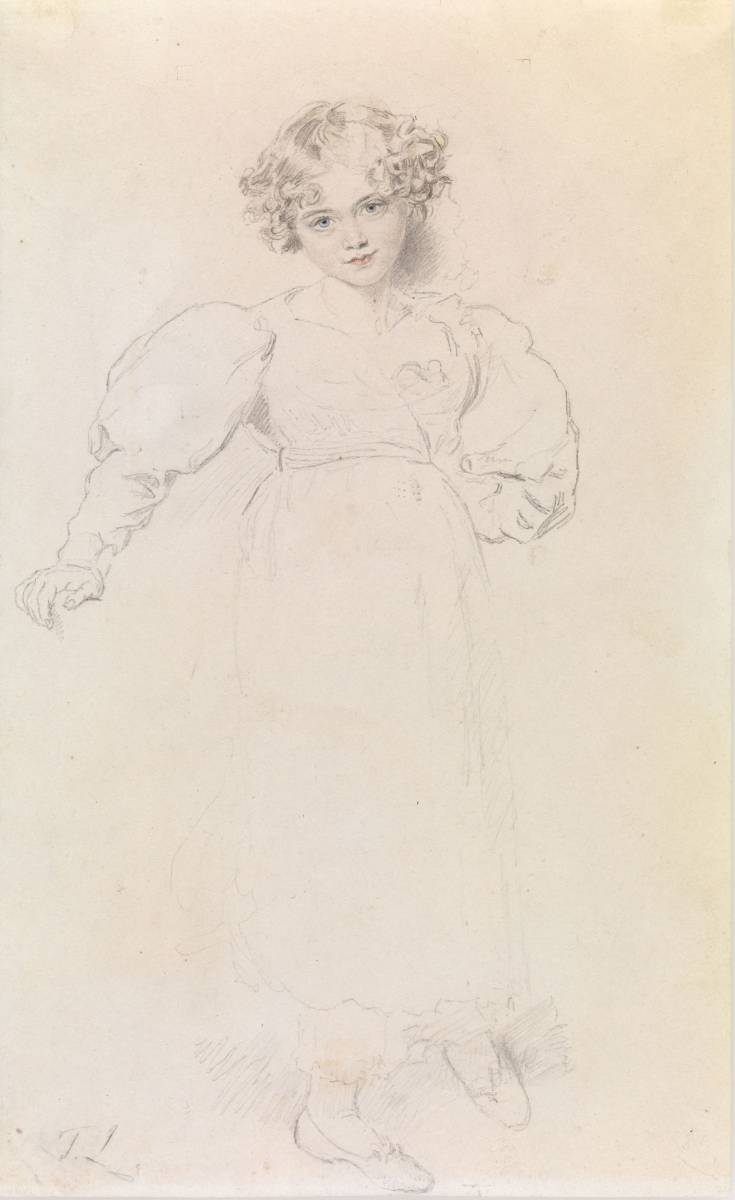
Jane Allnut (John's Daughter) sketched by Thomas Lawrence

Allnutt was a wealthy merchant of wine and brandy, who was a significant patron of the arts in the 19th century. He owned several major paintings by Turner and he may have commissioned the paintings The Pass of St. Gothard and The Devil's Bridge, St. Gothard from Turner. The latter of these has a signed label written by Allnutt dedicating the painting to his daughter on the back. He was one of the first patrons of Constable and is reported to have bought the first picture that Constable "ever sold to a stranger". Thomas Lawrence painted as many as five portraits of John Allnutt's family throughout his career.
