= Henry Brassey =

British Member of Parliament

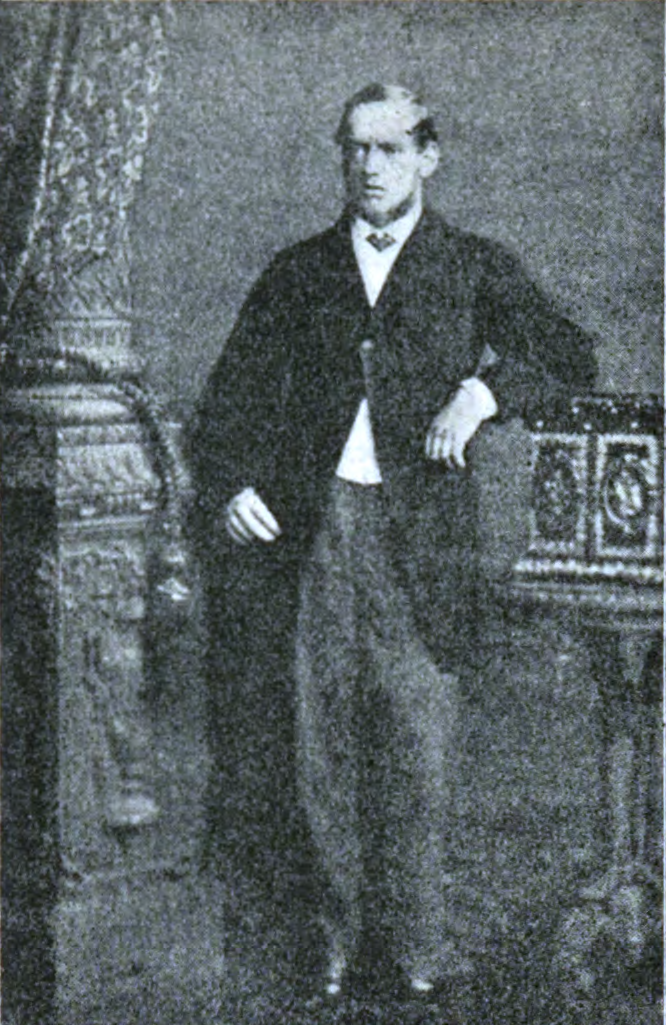

Member of the British Parliament for Sandwich
- In office 1868–1885

High Sheriff of Kent
- In office 1890

Personal details
- Born: 14 July 1840
- Died: 13 May 1891 (aged 50)
- Resting place: Church of St Peter and St Paul, Aylesford
- Party: Liberal
- Spouse: Anna Harriet Stevenson
- Children: 12, including: Henry Brassey, 1st Baron Brassey of Apethorpe; Harold Ernest Brassey; Hilda Brassey
- Parent: Thomas Brassey (father)
- Education: Oxford University

Henry Arthur Brassey (14 July 1840 – 13 May 1891), DL, of Preston Hall, Aylesford, Kent, and of Bath House, Piccadilly, London, was a British member of parliament.

== Origins ==
He was the second son of the railway magnate Thomas Brassey and his wife Maria Harrison, a daughter of Thomas Harrison of Liverpool. His elder brother was Thomas Brassey, 1st Earl Brassey, and his younger brother was Albert Brassey, a member of parliament for Banbury.

== Career ==
Arms of Brassey: Per fess indented sable and argent, in the first quarter a mallard of the second

He was educated at Oxford University, and in 1868 was elected as member of parliament for Sandwich in Kent, as a Liberal, a seat he held until 1885. Brassey served as a deputy lieutenant for Kent, as High Sheriff of Kent in 1890 and as a justice of the peace for that county.

== Marriage and children ==
In 1866 Brassey married Anna Harriet Stevenson (d.1898), a daughter of Major George Robert Stevenson of Tongswood, Hawkhurst, Kent, with whom he had five sons and seven daughters, including:

- Henry Brassey, 1st Baron Brassey of Apethorpe, second but eldest surviving son and heir, a Conservative politician who was raised to the peerage in 1938;
- Harold Ernest Brassey, soldier and polo champion;
- Hilda Brassey (Duchess of Richmond), wife of Charles Gordon-Lennox, 8th Duke of Richmond.
- Beatrice Brassey, co-founder of the White Heather Club, the first women's cricket club.

== Death ==
Brassey died in May 1891, aged 50.

Parliament of the United Kingdom
Preceded by Edward Knatchbull-Hugessen; Charles Capper	Member of Parliament for Sandwich; 1868–1885; With: Edward Knatchbull-Hugessen 1868–1880; Charles Henry Compton Roberts 1880–1885	Constituency abolished
