= Thomas Brassey, 1st Earl Brassey =

British politician

The Right Honourable The Earl Brassey GCB TD JP DL
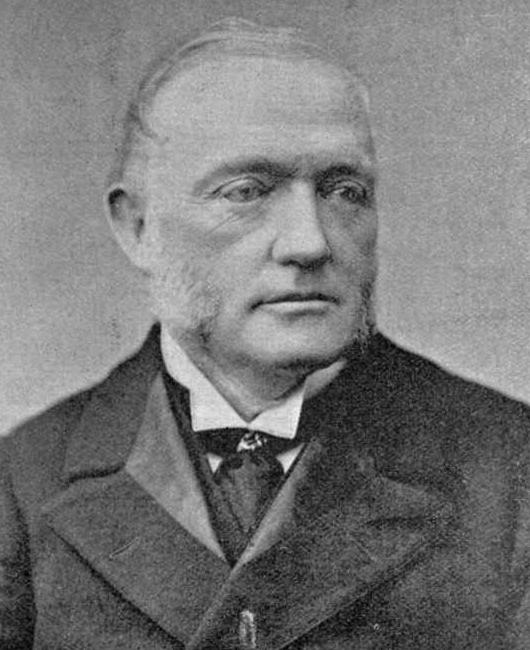
- Lord Brassey, 1895.

Governor of Victoria
- In office 6 February 1895 – 31 March 1900
- Monarch: Queen Victoria
- Preceded by: The Earl of Hopetoun
- Succeeded by: Sir George Clarke

Member of the House of Lords
- Lord Temporal
- In office 14 August 1886 – 23 February 1918
- Preceded by: Peerage created
- Succeeded by: The 2nd Earl Brassey

Personal details
- Born: 11 February 1836
- Died: 23 February 1918 (aged 82)
- Party: Liberal
- Spouses: 1: Anna Allnutt (m. 1860–1887; her death); 2: Sybil de Vere Capell
- Education: University College, Oxford

Arms of Brassey: Per fess indented sable and argent, in the first quarter a mallard of the second

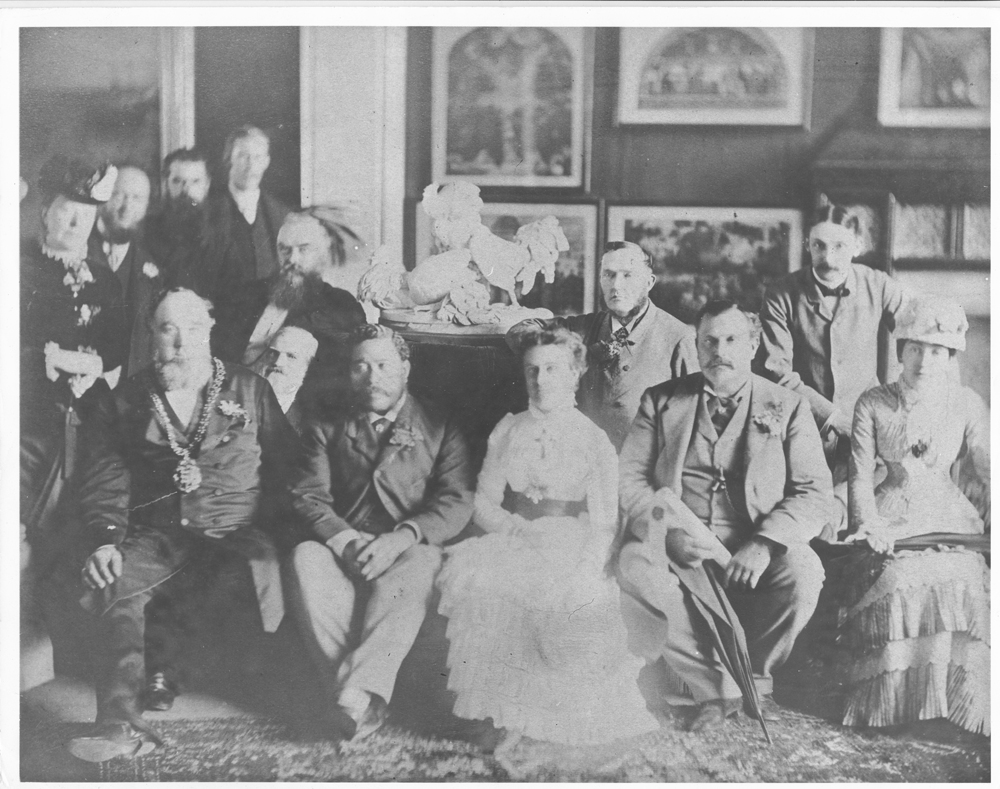
Lord Brassey and his wife entertaining King Kalākaua during his tour around the world, 1881

Thomas Brassey, 1st Earl Brassey (11 February 1836 – 23 February 1918), was a British Liberal Party politician, governor of the Colony of Victoria and founder of The Naval Annual.

== Background and education ==
Brassey was the eldest son of the railway magnate Thomas Brassey (1805–1870) by his wife Maria Harrison, a daughter of Joseph Harrison, a forwarding and shipping agent. He was the elder brother of Henry Brassey and Albert Brassey. He was educated at Rugby and University College, Oxford, and was called to the bar, Lincoln's Inn, in 1864.

== Political career ==
Brassey was briefly Member of Parliament (MP) for Devonport in 1865, winning the seat at a by-election in June and then losing it again the general election in July. He returned to Parliament three years later as the representative for Hastings at the 1868 general election, holding that seat until he was defeated at the 1886 general election. He was President of the first day of the 1874 Co-operative Congress. He served under William Ewart Gladstone as Civil Lord of the Admiralty from 1880 to 1884 and as Parliamentary Secretary to the Admiralty from 1884 to 1884. He was made a Knight Commander of the Order of the Bath (KCB) in 1881 and raised to the peerage as Baron Brassey, of Bulkeley in the County of Chester, in 1886. He again held office under Gladstone and then Lord Rosebery as a Lord-in-waiting from 1893 to 1895. In 1893 Queen Victoria appointed nine members as the Royal Opium Commission, which consisted of seven British and two Indian members, which was headed by Lord Brassey, who served as the Chairman. The commission was to report on whether India Opium export trade to far east (China) should be ended and, further, whether poppy growing and consumption of Opium in India itself should be prohibited save for medical purpose.

== Governor of Victoria ==
From 1895 to 1900 he was Governor of Victoria, a colony in Australia, and lived in its capital, Melbourne, in Government House. He returned to the United Kingdom in March 1900, by way of Colombo.

Upon his return to Britain, he was persuaded by Robert Perks to become president of the newly formed Imperial Liberal Council, and addressed the first public meeting of that body on 22 September 1900. He was succeeded as president in October 1901 by Sir Edward Grey, and became a councillor of the ILC's successor body, the Liberal League.

Brassey is remembered in Australia's national capital, Canberra, with Brassey House, now a hotel (originally a guest house) in the inner suburb of Barton, Australian Capital Territory, completed in 1927 to coincide with the relocation of the Federal Parliament from Melbourne to Canberra. Brassey House originally offered 45 rooms with shared bathing facilities, for the exclusive use of members of parliament and mid-level government officials relocating to Canberra. During the mid 1960s the government of the day expanded the capacity to 131 rooms and added conference and meeting rooms. It was sold in the mid-1980s to local businessmen and has been operated since as a residential hotel, now with 75 rooms including ensuites. It is said to have been built back-to-front, with the more ornate façade facing Belmore Gardens and its plainer face to Macquarie Street. 35.3115°S 149.1350°E

== Sailing ==
Brassey's first experience of sailing was while he was still at Rugby school. After a short spell in a hired yacht called Zillah he started to compete successfully in club events in a yacht called Cymba (1855). In 1859 he acquired the 120-ton iron yacht Albatross, designed by his friend St Clare John Byrne and built at his father's Canada Works. He was elected as a member of the Royal Yacht Squadron at this time. In 1866 he ventured into auxiliary steam with the yacht Meteor and in 1872 used the steam yacht Eothen to visit Canada, but she proved not to be best suited for this type of work. Eothen had formerly been owned by P&O co-founder Arthur Anderson.

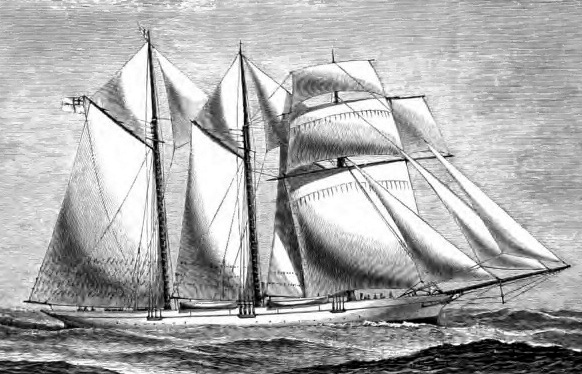
Sunbeam in full sail

Between 6 July 1876 and 27 May 1877 Brassey circumnavigated the world in his steam-assisted three-masted brigantine Sunbeam, another yacht designed for him by St Clare Byrne. This voyage is said to have been the first circumnavigation by a private yacht. His son Thomas left the Sunbeam at Rio de Janeiro in order to return to school in England. His wife, Anna, Lady Brassey (1839–1887), published an account of the cruise called In The Trades, The Tropics, & The Roaring Forties, or alternatively A Voyage in the Sunbeam: Our Home on the Ocean For Eleven Months. In 1880 Brassey's book The British Navy was published. In 1886, he started The Naval Annual (generally referred to as Brassey's Naval Annual). He edited The Naval Annual until 1891. He was succeeded as editor by his son Thomas.

At the age of 79 Brassey sailed his yacht Sunbeam to Moudros Bay as a hospital ship for the Gallipoli campaign.

== Honours and awards ==
Brassey was President of the Royal Statistical Society from 1879 to 1880. He was conferred with Honorary Membership of the Institution of Engineers and Shipbuilders in Scotland in 1891. Following his return from Australia, he was President of the London Chamber of Commerce 1901–1902. He served as Lord Warden of the Cinque Ports from 1908 to 1913.

He was appointed a Knight Grand Cross of the Order of the Bath in 1906 and made Viscount Hythe, of Hythe in the County of Kent, and Earl Brassey in 1911.

He was commissioned as a 2nd Lieutenant in the part-time 6th (Hastings) Cinque Ports Artillery Volunteer Corps on 1 June 1861, and was later the captain of the 9th (Pevensey) Cinque Ports AVC. He was appointed Honorary Colonel of the successor unit, the 2nd Cinque Ports Artillery Volunteers on 2 December 1891.

King David Kalākaua of Hawaii bestowed on Brassey the honour "Knight Commander of the Royal Order of Kalākaua".

== Freemasonry ==
Brassey was a freemason. He was initiated to the craft as an Oxford student. In 1868, he became a member of Abbey Lodge No. 1184 and remained for 48 years. He was also a member of Derwent Lodge No. 4 and a founding brother of Navy Lodge No. 2612. When he was appointed Governor of Victoria, while he had never held any Lodge office, he was appointed Honorary Past Junior Grand Warden. In Melbourne, became a member of Clarke Lodge No. 98 and became its Senior Warden in 1896 and its Worshipful Master in 1897. On 4 May 1896 two days before being installed as Senior Warden, he was installed Grand Master of the Grand Lodge of Victoria. His becoming of Grand Master was a bit controversial because many members preferred then-current Grand Master Sir William Clarke, 1st Baronet, to stay and nominated him again. Clarke said that he would like the nomination to be withdrawn if Brassey was willing to serve. Brassey approved and Clarke withdrew the nomination, so Brassey was the sole candidate and therefore elected Grand Master.

== Family ==
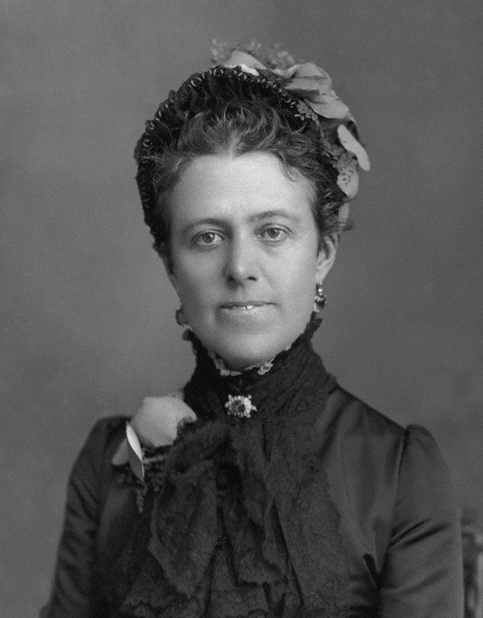
Anna, Lady Brassey

Brassey married firstly, in 1860, Anna Allnutt, daughter of John Allnutt, of Clapham, Surrey. They had one son and four daughters:

- Thomas Brassey, 2nd Earl Brassey (1863–1919), m. Lady Idina Mary Nevill, daughter of William Nevill, 1st Marquess of Abergavenny
- Lady Mabelle Annie Brassey CBE (1865–1927) m. Charles Augustus Egerton of Mountfield Court, Sussex, son of politician Edward Egerton
- Constance Alberta Brassey (“Sunbeam”) (1868-1873)
- Lady Muriel Agnes Brassey (1872–1930) m. Gilbert Sackville, 8th Earl De La Warr (divorced in 1902)
- Lady Marie Adelaide Brassey (1875–1960) m.Freeman Freeman-Thomas, 1st Marquess of Willingdon.

His first wife, Anna, Lady Brassey, died in September 1887, aged 47. Lord Brassey married secondly Lady Sybil de Vere Capell, daughter of Arthur Capell, Viscount Malden, and sister of George Capell, 7th Earl of Essex, in 1890. They had one daughter:

- Lady Helen de Vere Brassey (1892–1971) m. Lt. Col. Sir John Murray.

Brassey died in February 1918, aged 82, and was succeeded in the earldom by his only son, Thomas.

Parliament of the United Kingdom
Preceded by William Ferrand; Sir Arthur William Buller	Member of Parliament for Devonport; June 1865 – July 1865; With: William Ferrand	Succeeded by William Ferrand; John Fleming
Preceded by George Waldegrave-Leslie; Patrick Robertson	Member of Parliament for Hastings; 1868–1886; With: Frederick North 1868–1869; Ughtred Kay-Shuttleworth 1869–1880; Charles James Murray 1880–1883; Henry Bret Ince 1883–1885	Succeeded by Wilson Noble
Political offices
Preceded by Sir Massey Lopes, Bt	Civil Lord of the Admiralty; 1880–1884	Succeeded by George Wightwick Rendel
Preceded by Henry Campbell-Bannerman	Parliamentary Secretary to the Admiralty; 1884–1885	Succeeded by Charles Ritchie
Preceded by The Lord Wolverton	Lord-in-waiting; 1893–1895	Succeeded by The Earl Waldegrave
Government offices
Preceded by The Earl of Hopetoun	Governor of Victoria; 1895–1900	Succeeded by Sir George Clarke
Honorary titles
Preceded by The Prince of Wales	Lord Warden of the Cinque Ports; 1908–1913	Succeeded by The Earl Beauchamp
Masonic offices
Preceded by Sir William Clarke	Grand Master of the United Grand Lodge of Victoria; 1896–1900	Succeeded by Sir Alexander Peacock
Peerage of the United Kingdom
New creation	Earl Brassey; 1911–1918	Succeeded by Thomas Allnutt Brassey
New creation	Baron Brassey; 1886–1918; Member of the House of Lords (1886–1918)	Succeeded by Thomas Allnutt Brassey
