= Salaman =

Salaman is a surname. Notable people with the name include:

- Abraham Salaman (1881/6–1941), New Zealand merchant, dyer, herbalist and charlatan
- Annette Salaman (1827–1879), English Jewish writer
- Charles Kensington Salaman (1814–1901), British pianist and composer
- Chloe Salaman (born 1952), English film and television actress
- Clara Salaman (born 1967), English actress
- Esther Salaman (née Polianowsky) (1900–1995), Russian-born, English Jewish writer and physicist
- Julia Salaman (1812–1906), British portrait painter
- Malcolm Charles Salaman (1855–1940), English author, journalist and critic
- Maureen Kennedy Salaman (1936–2006), American author, proponent of alternative medicine, 1984 candidate for US Vice President
- Mohd Norizam Salaman (born 1984), Malaysian footballer who played as a striker
- Nina Salaman (née Davis) (1877–1925), British Jewish poet, translator, and social activist
- Paul Salaman (born 1971), ornithologist and conservationist based the Rainforest Trust in Latin America
- Lady Rachel Simon (née Salaman) (1823–1899), English Jewish author
- Raphael Salaman, FSA (1906–1993), English engineer, collector of hand tools and writer
- Redcliffe N. Salaman (1874–1955), British botanist and potato breeder

== See also ==
- Notre Dame of Salaman College, Catholic educational institution in Lebak, Sultan Kudarat, Philippines
- Prince Khalifa Bin Salaman Island, artificial island in the archipelago of Bahrain
- Masjid-al-Salaman, city and capital of Masjed Soleyman County, Khuzestan Province, Iran
- Salama (disambiguation)
- Salamanca
- Salamander (disambiguation)
- Salamandra
- Salamanga
- Salamani
- Salamansa
