= Bernard Lens =

Bernard Lens may refer to one of three British artists:

- Bernard Lens I (1630–1707), probably from the Netherlands, also the writer of several religious tracts
- Bernard Lens II (1659–1725), son of the former, mezzotint engraver
- Bernard Lens III (1682–1740), son of the former, portrait miniaturist
