= Lens (surname) =

Lens is a Dutch patronymic surname. The given name Lens is a now rare short form of Laurens. Notable people with the surname include:

- Andries Cornelis Lens (1739–1822), Flemish painter
- Anton Lens (1884–1955), Dutch footballer
- Bernard Lens I (1630/31–1707), Dutch painter and writer who moved to England
- Bernard Lens II (1659–1725), English engraver, mezzotinter, and publisher, son of the above
- Bernard Lens III (1682–1740), English portrait miniaturist, son of the above
- Dennis Lens (born 1977), Dutch badminton player
- Jeremain Lens (born 1987), Dutch-Surinamese footballer
- Louis Lens (1924–2001), Flemish rose breeder
- Nicholas Lens (born 1957), Belgian composer
- Sidney Lens (1912–1986), American labor leader, political activist and writer, born as Sid Okun
- Sigi Lens (born 1963), Dutch-Surinamese footballer and sports agent

== See also ==
- Lense, a German-language surname
- Arnoud de Lens (c.1510–1582), Dutch humanist philosopher and poet known as Arnoldus Arlenius
