= Malcolm Charles Salaman =

English author, journalist and critic

Malcolm Charles Salaman (6 September 1855 – 22 January 1940) was an English author, journalist and critic. He was born and died in London.

== Life ==
Of a Jewish family, the son of Charles Kensington Salaman, a musician, and his wife Frances Simon, he was born in the City of London and educated at University College School and Owens College, Manchester, where he studied mechanical engineering for four years.

Salaman had a mumber of literary and artistic aunts, including Rachel, Rose Emma, Annette, and Julia Salaman.

== Career ==
Salaman became a journalist, eventually editing two weekly papers. His critical writing was devoted chiefly to Old master prints and to plays. From 1883 to 1894, he was dramatic and art critic for the Sunday Times, and from 1890 to 1899 was on the staff of The Graphic. He wrote regularly on prints for the art magazines The Studio and Apollo.

Salaman also wrote the introductions to the 33-volume series Modern Masters of Etching published between 1925 and 1932 by The Studio, each of which contained reproductions of twelve prints by a great etcher. This series included volumes on Frank Brangwyn, Alphonse Legros, Ernest Stephen Lumsden, Malcolm Osborne and Edmund Blampied.

== Personal life ==
At the time of the census of 1901, Salamon was living in Sutherland Avenue, Paddington, with his father and two female servants. In 1914 he married one of them, Annie Sarah Isaac. They had no children.

== Works ==
Among his numerous writings are:

- Ivan's Love Quest and Other Poems (1879)
- Woman through a Man's Eyeglass (1892)
- The Old Engravers of England (1906)
- Old English Color Prints (1909)
- Old English Mezzotints (1910)
- Modern Etchings (British) (1912)
- French Colour-Prints of the Eighteenth Century (1913)

Salaman edited the plays of Sir A. W. Pinero (1891–1900) and himself wrote several plays.
