= Lens (disambiguation) =

A lens is an optical element that converges or diverges light.

Lens may also refer to:

== Optics ==
- Lens (anatomy), a part of the eye
- Corrective lens for correction of human vision
  - Contact lens, placed on the cornea of the eye
- Camera lens, a lens designed for use on a camera

=== Other radiation focus and forces ===
- Gravitational lens, a massive astronomical object which causes visual distortions
- Electrostatic lens, a device used to focus or collimate electron beams
- Explosive lens, a shaped explosive charge with focused blast

== Places ==
- Lens, Pas-de-Calais, a city in Northern France
- Arrondissement of Lens, an arrondissement in the Pas-de-Calais département of France
  - RC Lens, a football (soccer) club from Lens, France
- Lens, Belgium
- Lens, Switzerland

== Science ==
- Lens (plant), the genus of the lentil plant
- Lens (geometry), a geometric shape formed from two arcs
- Lens (geology), a body of ore or rock that is thick in the middle and thin at the edges
- Lens (hydrology), a layer of fresh water derived from rainfall, overlying saline groundwater
- Kamera lens (biology), a unicellular, flagellate organism and the only species of the genus Kamera
- Ice lens

== Computing ==
- Filter (social media), sometimes called a lens
- Google Lens, an augmented reality feature for smartphones
- Microsoft Lens, a document scanning feature part of Microsoft Office
- Bidirectional transformation in computer science

== Other uses ==
- Lens (film), a 2016 Indian film made simultaneously in Malayalam and Tamil
- "Lens" (Alanis Morissette song), 2012
- Lens (Frank Ocean song), 2017
- "Lens" (The Leftovers), a 2015 television episode
- The Lens, an online patent search facility and knowledge resource
- The Lens (band), a predecessor of IQ, a British neo-progressive rock group
- The Lens (website), in-depth news and investigations for New Orleans, USA
- European Laboratory for Non-Linear Spectroscopy (LENS)
- Laser engineered net shaping, a rapid prototyping technology capable of building fully dense metal parts
- Low Energy Neutron Source, a particle accelerator in particle physics
- Lens (surname)
- Lens, a fictional alien device in E. E. Smith's Lensman series
- Perspective (cognitive)

== See also ==
- Len (disambiguation)
- Lense (disambiguation)
