= Len =

Len or LEN may refer to:

== People and fictional characters ==
- Len (given name), a list of people and fictional characters
- Lén, a character from Irish mythology
- Alex Len (born 1993), Ukrainian basketball player
- Mr. Len, American hip hop DJ
- Len Lucci (born 1999), British rapper
- Len Kagamine, Vocaloid

== LEN ==
- The Lake Erie and Northern Railway, a defunct interurban electric railway in Ontario, Canada
- Ligue Européenne de Natation, the European Swimming League
  - LEN Trophy

== Codes ==
- Extinct Lencan languages of Central America (ISO 639-3 code:len)
- León Airport (IATA airport code:LEN) near León, Spain
- Lentini Aviation (ICAO airline code:LEN)

== Other uses ==
- Len (band), a Canadian indie rock group
- Len (Norway), an important Norwegian administrative entity during 1536–1814
- Len (programming), a function that gives the length of a text string in some dialects of BASIC programming language
- River Len, a river in the English county of Kent

== See also ==
- Lens (disambiguation)
- Liquid Len, British lighting designer
