= Walter Goodman (artist) =

English painter

- Born: 11 May 1838; London, England
- Died: 20 August 1912 (aged 74); London, England
- Education: Julia Goodman, Royal Academy, London
- Known for: Painting, drawing, writing
- Notable work: The Printseller's Window (c. 1882); Home of the Bamboo (c. 1882); Fanny Stirling (1885); Mrs Keeley at Fourscore (1885); Young Keeley (1905); The Pearl of the Antilles, or An Artist in Cuba (1873); The Keeleys on Stage and at Home (1895)

Walter Goodman (11 May 1838 – 20 August 1912) was an English painter, illustrator and author.

He was the son of English portrait painter Julia Salaman (1812–1906) and London linen draper and town councillor, Louis Goodman (1811–1876).

In 1846 he enrolled at J. M. Leigh's drawing Academy at 79 Newman Street, where he was the youngest pupil. In 1851, after fours years at Leigh's Academy, he was admitted as a student to the Royal Academy in London.

Recent research has unearthed details of more than one hundred works by Goodman. The present whereabouts of most these are unknown, notable exceptions being The Printseller's Window (c. 1882), acquired by the Memorial Art Gallery of the University of Rochester in 1998, portraits of actresses Mary Anne Keeley (also known as Mrs. Keeley at Fourscore) and Fanny Stirling (1885), both in the collection of London's Garrick Club, A Kitchen Cabinet (1882) in a private collection in the US, Fresh and Pure (1882) and a Cuban scene, Home of the Bamboo, in a private collection in Sweden. Several sketches, paintings and water colours, are still in the possession of Walter Goodman's descendants.

== Early work ==
Shortly after 1851 Goodman embarked upon a six-month walking tour around England and Wales, taking portraiture and sketching commissions along the way – most notably that of James Henry Cotton, Dean of Bangor. Upon returning to London Goodman concentrated on figure subjects. His first original work Doctoring The Cane, was exhibited at The Liverpool Academy in 1858, and in 1859 at The British Institution on Pall Mall in London. Doctoring the Cane was exhibited and sold as an Art Union prize at the annual exhibition in Manchester, probably in 1859.

Another of Goodman's early works is his depiction of the 1858 trial of Dr Simon Bernard over the attempted assassination of Napoleon III. The painting hung in the Tavistock Square home of Goodman's uncle, Sir John Simon (1818–1897), who worked on the trial as Edwin James' junior.

Around this time Goodman toured the provinces with a theatrical company, having gained employment as a scenery painter, after which he was commissioned by the United States to produce a series of panoramic views in Distemper (paint) depicting the Crimean War. A publication of 1859 refers to Goodman as a scene painter and goes on to describe Goodman's (and various siblings') appearance in an amateur play staged at the Baker Street, London home of another uncle, the composer Charles Kensington Salaman (1814–1901). The production received glowing reviews. A somewhat comical flyer from the same year, of a production at the Goodman family home at Mabledon Place in London, describes Goodman as a hammerteur artist (alluding to the fact that he also constructed the scenery).

In 1861 Goodman's painting of the Interior of The Cathedral of San Lorenzo, Genoa was exhibited at the Royal Scottish Academy. The British Institution also exhibited Bible Stories in 1861. In 1862 The Liverpool Society of Fine Arts exhibited Il Monte della Croce, San Miniato, Florence and Interior of The Cathedral of San Lorenzo, Genoa.

== Travels in Europe ==
Beginning in 1860 Goodman undertook extensive travel to France, Belgium, Germany, Switzerland, Italy, and Spain. He spent almost two years in Florence, beginning in 1861, refining his skills by copying Old Master paintings at the Uffizi and Pitti palaces. There he met fellow artist, Joaquín Cuadras, whom he painted several times, and the renowned Spanish painter Mariano Fortuny.

One of Goodman's favourite destinations was Spain – he was fluent in Spanish and Italian. He travelled with Cuadras to Barcelona in 1862, where he spent almost a year, before returning alone, via Marseille and Paris, to England and, later, Scotland (where he again met up with Cuadras). In Edinburgh, he resided for a short time during 1864 with his journalist brother, Edward, then an assistant to Edinburgh Courant publisher, James Hannay, whom he painted (exhibited at the Royal Scottish Academy in 1864), as well as author David Smith (brother of the poet Alexander Smith). Another work, entitled Head was also exhibited at the Royal Scottish Academy the same year.

== Travels in the West Indies ==
In 1864, now rejoined by Cuadras, Goodman travelled to Rome and then on to Saint-Nazaire in France where, on 16 April 1864, they set sail on the French steamer Veracruz to the West Indies, arriving in Santiago, Cuba on 9 May at 9.30 am or 10 May 1864.

Upon arrival in Santiago, Goodman and Cuadras lodged with Cuadras' sister, Amalia, at 113 Enramadas Street. A month later, they rented a house on Santa Rosa Street, in the Tivoli district, and installed a studio there. Most of Goodman's time in the West Indies was spent in Santiago and Havana, Cuba, working as an artist and journalist and painting theatrical sets. He also appeared in many stage productions, putting his fluency in Spanish to good use.

In 1868, Goodman designed and built a triumphal arch on Calle de Marina in Santiago de Cuba. It was reported as being forty-five feet high, and thirty-five feet wide, covered with new pine boards and built in the Norman style of the facades of the Tower of London and Canterbury Cathedral. On its four columns and both fronts there were allegorical figures painted in white and gold, representing Commerce, Industry, Agriculture, and Justice. In addition, Goodman painted seven war scenes recalling the deeds of General Laureano: Miranda de Arga, June 25, 1834—Siege and blockade of Zaragoza, 1843—Deeds of Oporto, 1846—Campaign of Portugal, 1847—General Staff of Madrid, March 7, 1848—General Staff of Catalonia, May 17, 1848—Campaign of Italy, 1849. It is painted in yellow and red tones, ornamented with green leaves. On top was a shield dedicated to Francisco de Lersundi Hormaechea, the Captain General of Cuba. At night the arch was illuminated and could be seen from the bay and Calle de Marina.

During his time in Cuba, Goodman contributed articles and letters to the New York Herald, using the pen name el Caballero Inglese. In this capacity he travelled to Port Royal in Jamaica in August 1868 in connection with the laying of the undersea cable between Cuba and Jamaica. He wrote a series of articles about his Jamaican trip, entitled Un Viaje al Estranjero. These were subsequently published in English, in a journal in Kingston. Whilst in Cuba, the Spanish light comedian Don Baltasar Torrecillas asked Goodman to adapt Maddison Morton's farce Box and Cox for the Spanish stage. He also painted scenery for the theatre in Santiago with which Torrecillas was connected.

In 1864 Goodman, Cuadras, and a servant were sketching in the Santiago area, when they were arrested by the military and imprisoned in the subterannean dungeons of the Morro Castle, under suspicion of making plans of the castle fortifications. They remained incarcerated until the English Vice-Consul, Mr F. W. Ramsden, supported by Cuadras' influential friends, interceded for their release. The Ten Years' War broke out towards the end of 1868 – and Goodman's involvement in this forced him to flee Cuba. So abrupt was his departure from the island that many of the sketches and paintings which he and Cuadras had intended to transport to Europe, were left behind and never recovered.

Boarding the American steamer Morro Castle in January 1870, Goodman and Cuadras visited Puerto Rico, Santo Domingo and other islands. Goodman and Cuadras parted company here and Cuadras travelled on to Jamaica, whilst Goodman continued on to New York City.

== Prolific period ==
Goodman spent only a few months in the United States before returning to London in the first half of 1870 when he painted portraits of Sir Thomas Brassey MP, his wife, Lady Anna Brassey, their children, and Mr. Brassey senior. The Brassey portraits were hung at the Brassey estate at Normanhurst Court in Sussex. The same year he painted a Portrait of a Young Boy on a Horse, which was sold at Christie's in London in July 1998.

In 1871 he exhibited a portrait of Evelyn, Daughter of G.J.Reid, Esq. of Tunbridge Wells at the Royal Academy and his portrait of his uncle, Serjeant Simon M.P. was displayed at the Royal Oak Hotel in Simon's constituency of Dewsbury, Yorkshire. Photographic evidence exists of three portraits from 1871 to 1872, entitled Master Nicholls, Mr N Birkenruth, and Mrs N Birkenruth.

In 1872 Goodman contributed a piece entitled A Cigarette Manufacturer at Havana to the London Society magazine and one called General Tacon's Judgmen to the Daily Pacific Tribune, a Washington newspaper. In 1873 he published an account of his years in Cuba, entitled The Pearl of the Antilles, or An Artist in Cuba, to favorable reviews (reprinted in Cuba in 1986). The book was based upon a series of humorous sketches first published in Charles Dickens' periodical All the Year Round. The same year he contributed some sketches of Santiago to The Graphic magazine.

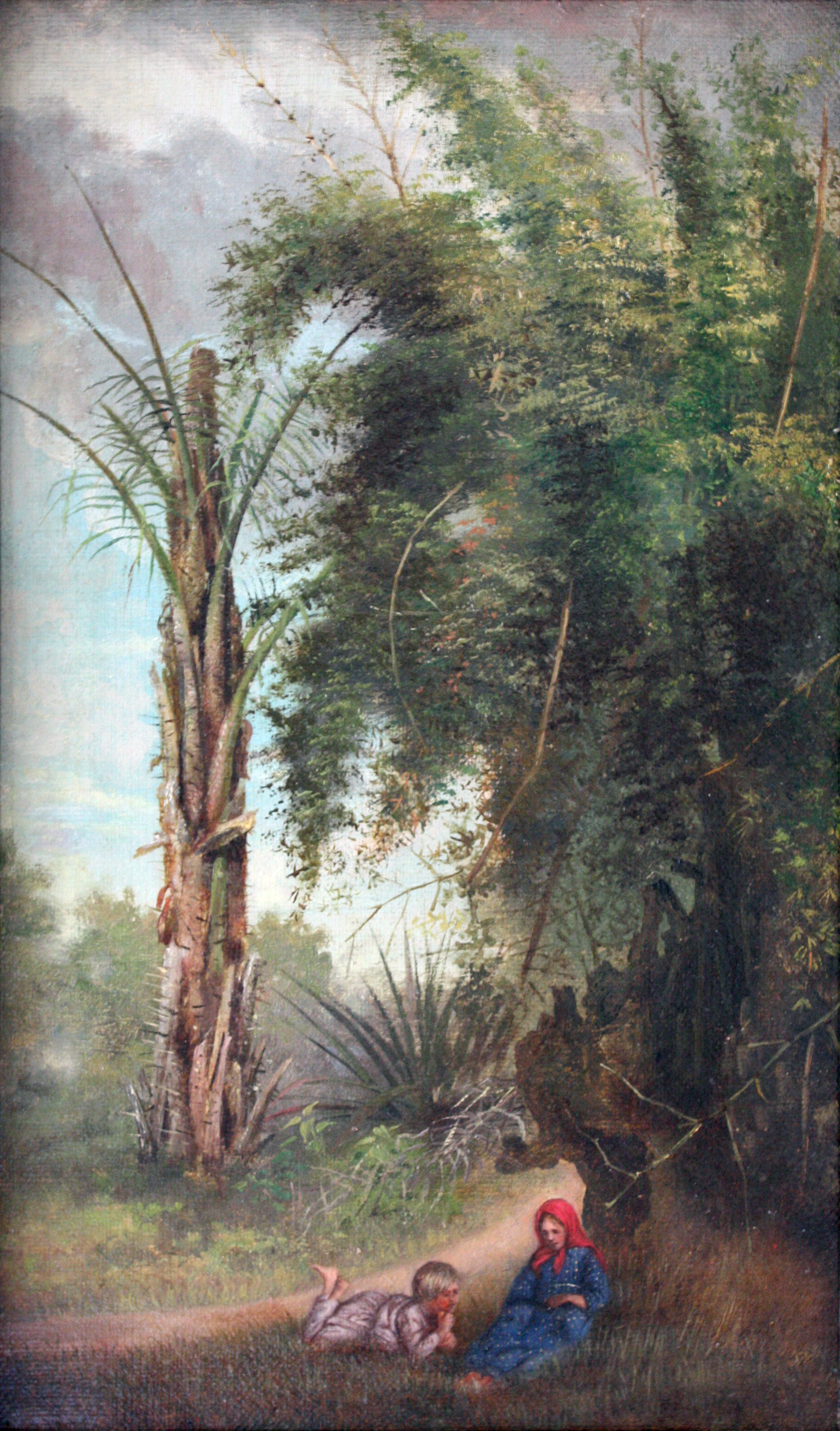
Home of the Bamboo.

The February 1874 issue of Cassell's Magazine included two articles by Goodman titled "Saved From a Wreck" and "Cuba Without a Master." In April of that year he wrote another article for the same magazine called "A Holiday in Cuba", which he illustrated with a pretty Cuban girl looking through a barred window.< That winter also saw the exhibition of oil paintings titled Young Castille and Voices of the Sea at London's Dudley and French Galleries, respectively. In 1876 he exhibited a drawing, The Language of the Face (also used on the front cover of The Pictorial World periodical) at The Black and White Exhibition at The Dudley Gallery and Morning Work at the London Exhibition of Fine Arts. The latter work was probably a trompe-l'œil painting, as it is described in a publication of the day as a housemaid is cleaning a window, which the spectator is meant to be looking through. The Mail describes it as a pretty housemaid cleaning a window, and seen through the plate glass, a novel idea cleverly worked out. The painting was sold during the exhibition.

In 1877 two pages of drawings of Russian peasantry by Goodman appeared in the Illustrated London News, as well as an illustration for a Wilkie Collins story, "A Bit for Bob" in the magazine's Christmas Number, entitled "A Little Baggage."

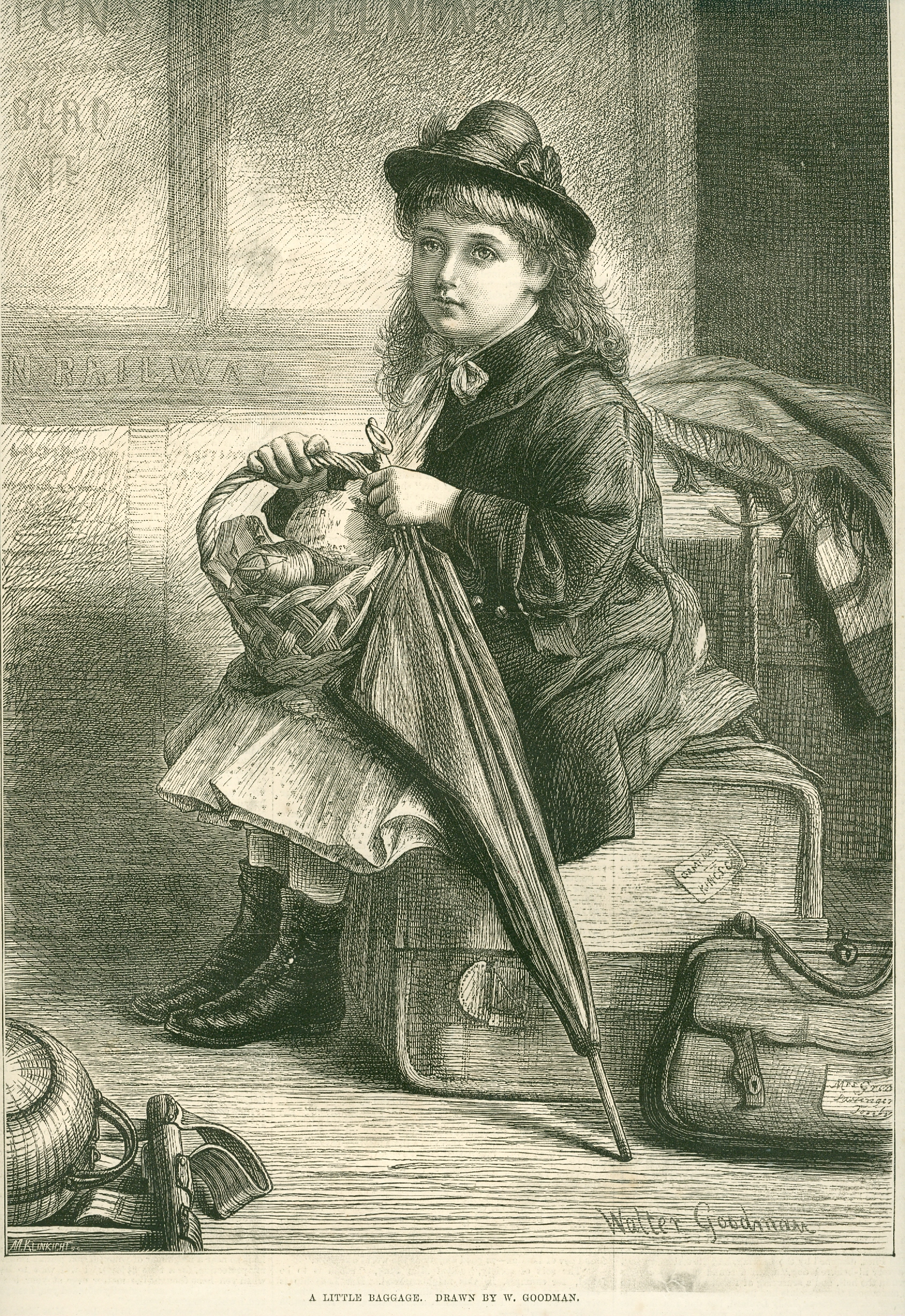
A Little Baggage.

Around this time, Goodman moved to Bradford, Yorkshire and lived with his sister, Alice for several years. Goodman contributed the same drawing to two books in 1879 – God is taking care of me to the Ellen Haile children's book Three Brown Boys and other Happy Children (the other main contributing artist was the renowned children's book illustrator Kate Greenaway) and Floy's first flight to The One Syllable Book. The same drawing appeared again, in 1885, as Obedient Bessie in a children's book called Little Ramblers and Other Stories. In 1877 he exhibited A Factory Girl depicting a Bradford mill worker returning home from work, at The Dudley Gallery.

That same year Goodman scored two coups involving the new Chinese diplomatic missions to Europe. Liu Hsi-Hung, Chinese minister to the Court of Berlin, commissioned him to copy the National Gallery's Madonna in Prayer by Sassoferrato, reputedly the first commission given by a Chinese to an English artist. The painting was subsequently dispatched to Germany. He also painted His Excellency Kuo Ta-Jen (Kuo Sung-Tao), Chinese Minister to the Court of St. James's (China's first such ambassador), initially exhibited in 1878 at the Royal Academy and later at the Walker Art Gallery in Liverpool. The authorities back in China showed their displeasure at allowing counterfiet presentments by not giving permission for the painting to be transported to China. It was eventually purchased by a private collector known to Goodman, and its present whereabouts are unknown.

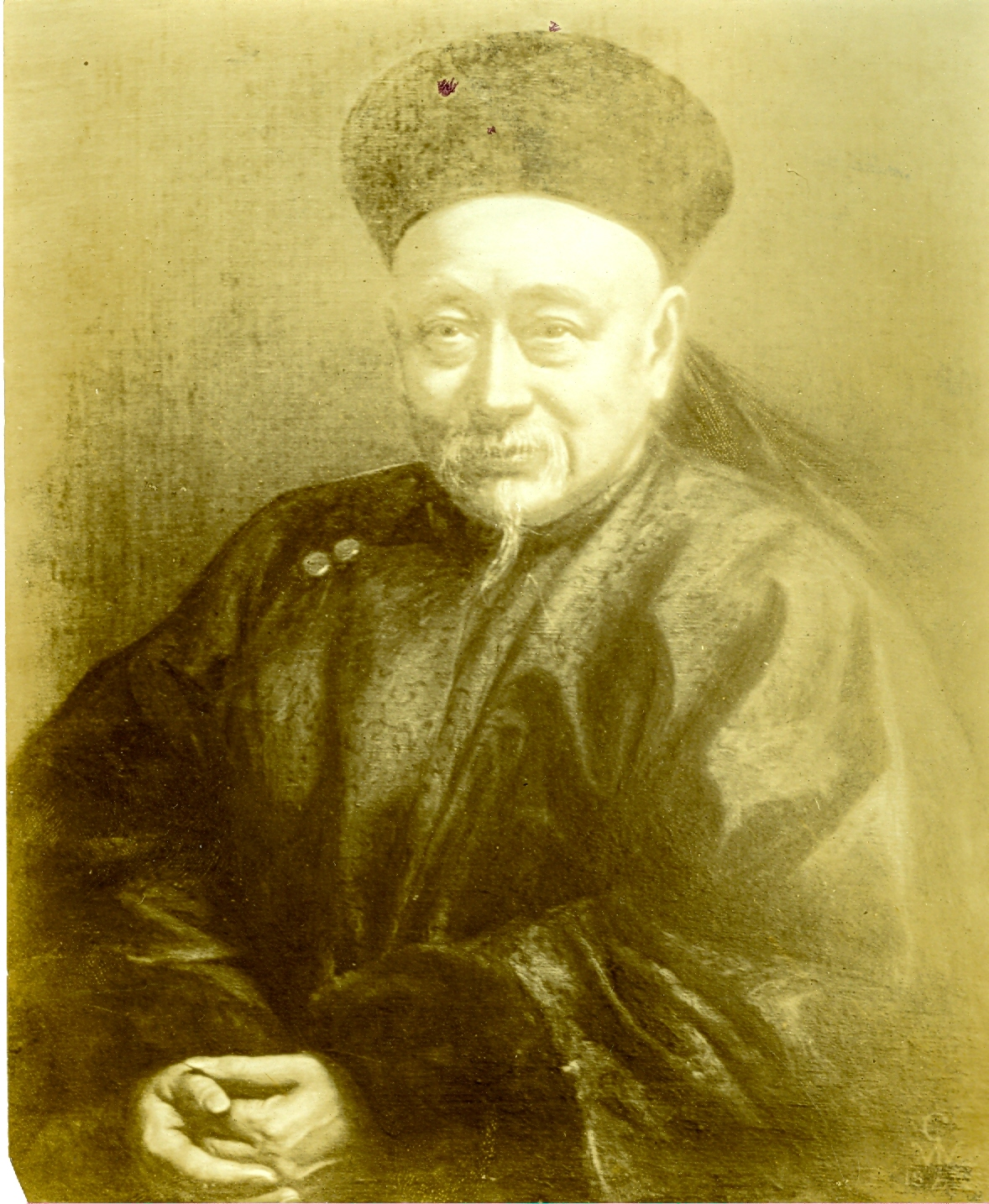
A Victorian photograph of Walter Goodman's 1877 portrait of His Excellency Kuo Ta-Jen.

The same year Goodman sent another full-length portrait of A Chinese Lady of Rank (the sitter was Kuo Tai-Tai, the wife of Kuo-Ta-Jen) to the Royal Academy, after first previewing a preliminary study for Queen Victoria in March 1879 at Windsor Castle. Kuo Tai-Tai also featured in a group portrait by Goodman, together with her young child and child's nurse. This painting was later taken back to China by the ambassador. Major General William Yorke-Moore sat for Goodman in 1879 and this portrait is now in a private collection at The Keep Military Museum, Dorchester, Dorset, England.

Wilkie Collins sat for Goodman around 1880–1881 but the sitting was interrupted by a severe illness Goodman contracted towards the end of 1881. He moved to Broadstairs in the company of his mother, in order to recover. The painting of Collins was known as Wilkie Collins until Collins' death in 1889. It was subsequently exhibited as The Late Mr. Wilkie Collins at the age of 56.

Goodman's trip to Windsor might have led to The Queen's son, Prince Leopold, Duke of Albany, sitting for Goodman (the Prince never sat for another artist). The Prince had his sixth and final sitting in March 1881 at Windsor Castle His portrait was submitted to the Royal Academy in 1881. A court circular from Marlborough House dated 28 July 1884 notes that Goodman submitted the portrait of The Duke of Albany to the Prince and Princess of Wales from where it was currently displayed in a place of honour surrounded by flowers (The Prince had died earlier that year) at the exhibition of the City of London Society of Artists at the old law courts of The Guildhall. The painting was purchased around 1884 by The National Hospital in Queen Square, London. The hospital has no record of the present whereabouts of the painting.

In the summer of 1883 Goodman sold two oil paintings at J.P. Mendoza's St. James's Gallery at King Street in London – Fresh and Pure (also known as Pure and Undefiled) and Candidate for the Front Row (also known as First at the Gallery Door). Goodman was a member of London's Savage Club and in 1883 submitted a drawing of the club president, Andrew Halliday, to the club tombola. Goodman was very fond of pantomime as a child, and depicted in pencil and water colour two children at the door of Drury Lane Theatre, staring longingly at the advertising poster for Little Red Riding Hood. In 1888 Goodman would paint the retired pantomime clown, Tom Matthews, in his 88th year.

At The Theatre Door.

In 1884 Goodman offered a water colour, Longing Eyes, for 10 guineas, at the Liverpool Autumn Exhibition. That year the annual exhibition of the City of London Society of Artists moved from its premises at the Worshipful Company of Skinners on Dowgate Hill, to the old law courts at The Guildhall and Goodman submitted Idle Dreams and In Possession. The latter work was of the two playing children of the artist and illustrator Harry Furniss.

Photograph of In Possession taken from the privately pressed 1885 book Art in the City by Edward William Parkes.

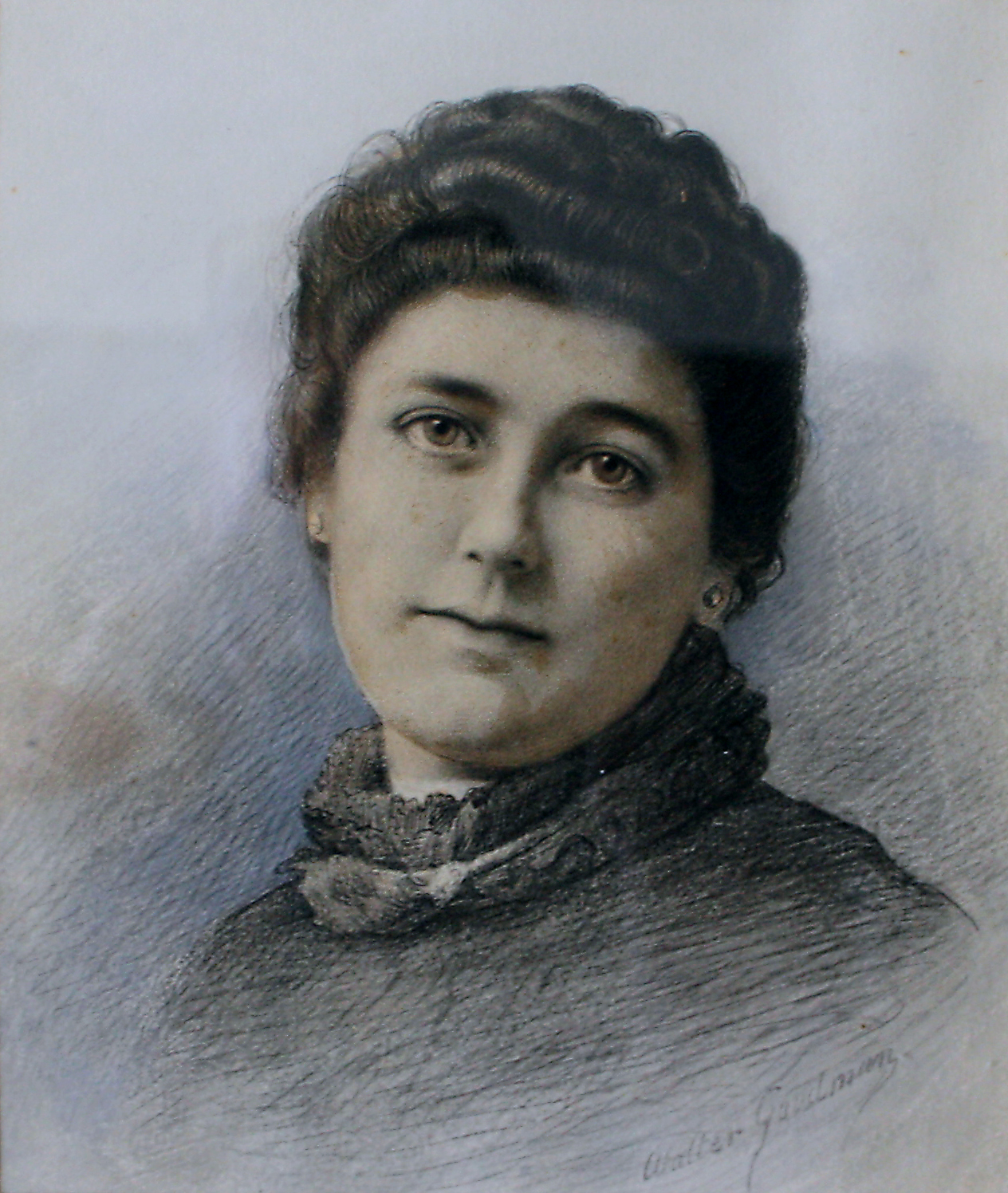
Mrs Cornwallis-West.

In a departure from painting portraits, around October 1884 Goodman moved to Chalford in the Cotswolds to paint two landscapes of the valley below from the brow of a hill at Cowcombe Woods overlooking the village. He stayed in Chalford for at least five months.

Goodman contributed at least four essays to The Theatre during 1885 and 1886, entitled An English Ballet in Spain, Art Behind the Curtain, An Englishman on the Spanish Stage, and "Box and Cox" in Spanish.

Goodman is also credited with a portrait of the then Duke of Edinburgh (Queen Victoria's second son Alfred). His last Royal Academy submission (1888) was a portrait entitled Mrs. Keeley in her 83rd Year which is recorded as having subsequently found its way to London's bohemian Savage Club, of which the artist was a member from 1873 to 1894 and where his brother Edward was chairman of the committee. Another Keeley painting, Mrs. Keeley at Fourscore (now housed at the Garrick Club) was exhibited at Institute of Oil Painters and Bond Street's Burlington Gallery in 1885. Goodman was an admirer of Mary Anne Keeley and her acting family, publishing an appreciation in 1895 entitled The Keeleys on the Stage and at Home, which contains engravings of several of his portrait paintings. Goodman's life interest in the theatre culminated in an appearance with Mrs. Keeley in a full-scale production on the stage of the Prince of Wales Theatre on the night of 16 January 1884. At about the same time he painted the actress, Mrs. Alfred Mellon (née Sarah Woolgar). Another actress whose portrait Goodman painted was Amy Sedgwick. A year after her death in 1897, her third husband presented the portrait to the Garrick Club, where it remained until 1969. Other arts-related personalities who were captured by Goodman's brush included Negro Delineator, E. W. Mackney, the dramatist Henry Pettitt and composer Sir George A. MacFarren (who also sat for Goodman's mother Julia).

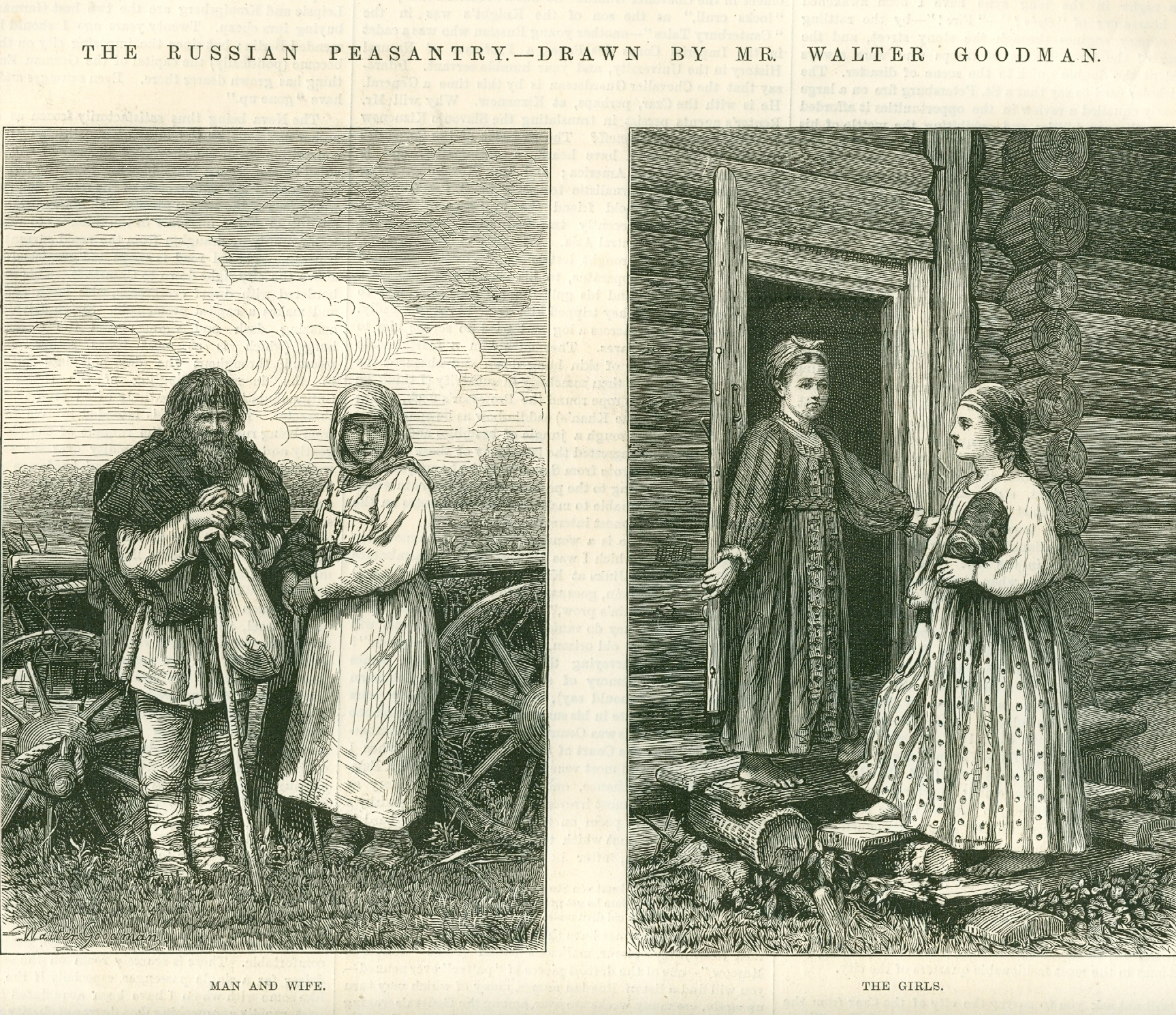
The Russian Peasantry.

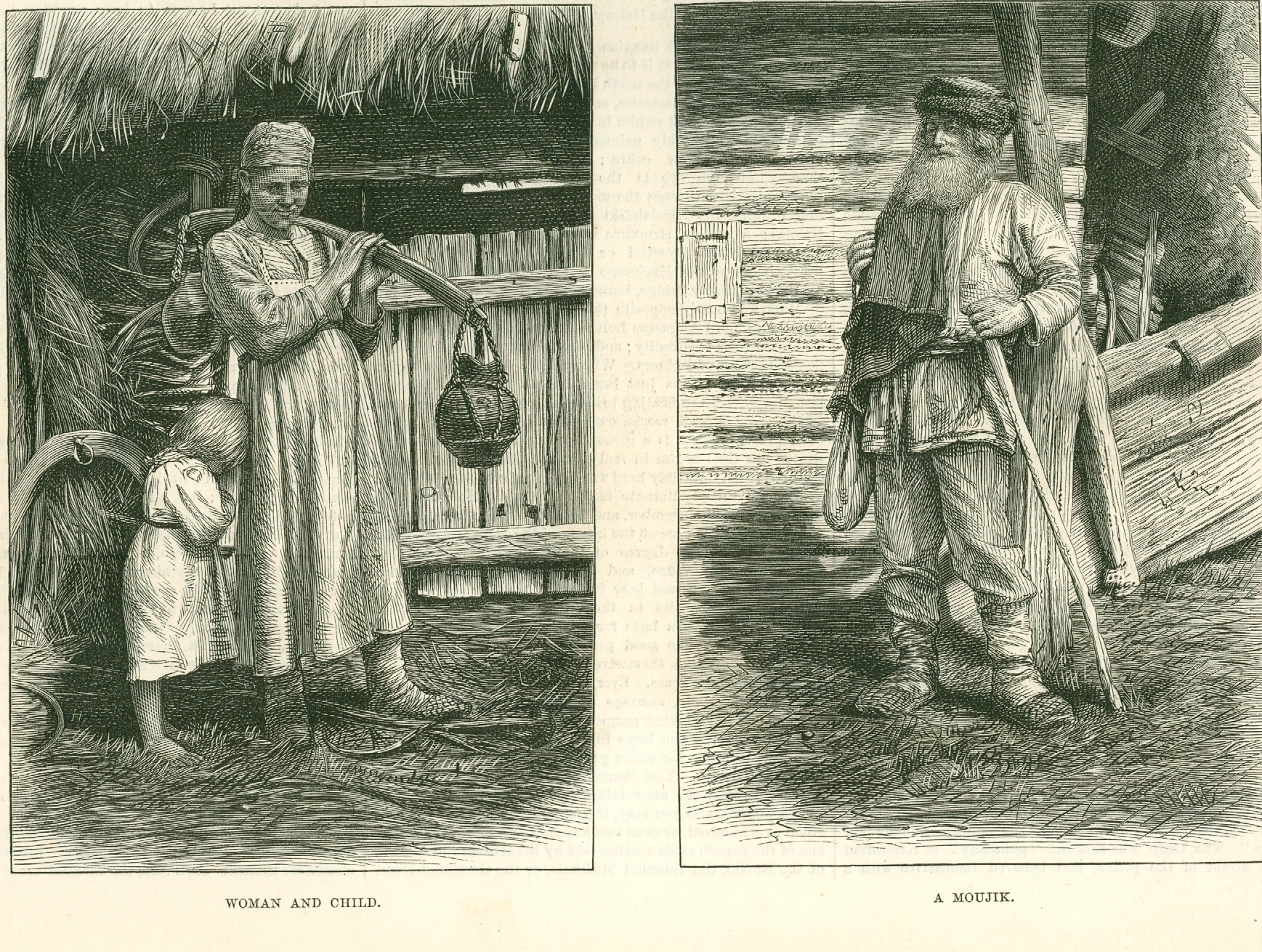
The Russian Peasantry.

In 1887 Goodman exhibited three portraits – Mary Anne Keeley, Fanny Stirling (both presumably loaned from The Garrick Club), and Grace Darling, at the Signor Palladiense Gallery, on Bond Street in London. The Keeley and Stirling portraits were also exhibited in 1887 at Messrs Hennah and Kent's studios in London's Old Kent Road. In 1888 Goodman produced a head and shoulders portrait of Fanny Stirling Mrs Stirling (Lady Hutton Gregory).

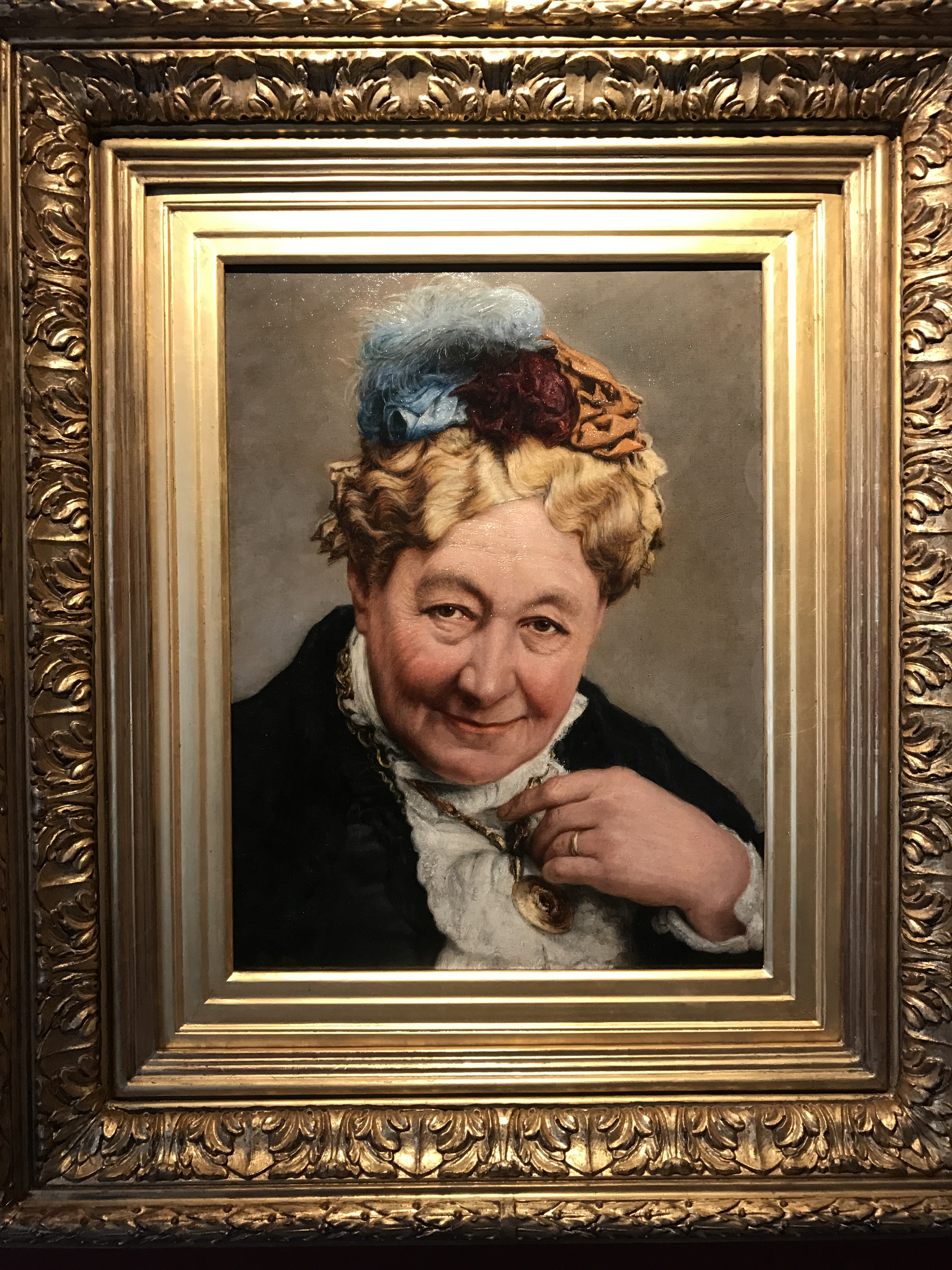
Fanny Stirling

.

In two consecutive annual exhibitions at the Institute of Oil Painters Goodman exhibited Mr Henry Russell (1889), Mr Lionel Brough (1890), and Kathleen, the latter of which was sold at the exhibition. In 1889 he exhibited Dolly at J. P. Mendoza's St. James's Gallery. The following year The Late Mr. Wilkie Collins at the age of 56 was shown at The Royal Society of British Artists.

In 1890 Goodman contributed at least one painting to an exhibition in New York City. The proceeds from the sale of the paintings were to benefit the ailing Irish-born American artist Arthur Lumley (1837–1912).

On 18 February 1895 his sketch Fifteen Minutes Grace was performed at The Prince of Wales Club.

The Mr Henry Russell portrait was donated to The Savage Club in 1890, and they lent it to the Japanese Gallery on New Bond Street in London and to the Exhibition of Dramatic and Musical Art at the Grafton Galleries in 1897.

== The Printseller's Window ==
Around 1883 Goodman painted a fascinating trompe-l'œil depiction of the contents of a printseller's window (including the merchant himself, placing a figure in the display). Twelve carte-de-visite photographs are strung across the shop window, along with other photographs depicting artists and critics such as John Ruskin, Mariano Fortuny y Marsal and Augustus Sala

The Printseller's Window (also known as The Printseller, A Print Seller's Shop Window, or A Print Seller's Window in The Strand) was displayed at various London galleries, including St. James's Gallery in 1883, the Burlington Gallery in Bond Street (together with Mrs. Keeley at Fourscore) from August 1885, Earls Court British and Foreign Art galleries Section, and at Imre Kiralfy's Venice in London exhibition at Olympia in 1892 (where the painting was entitled The Venetian Printseller). The painting was widely reported in the London and provincial newspapers of the day.

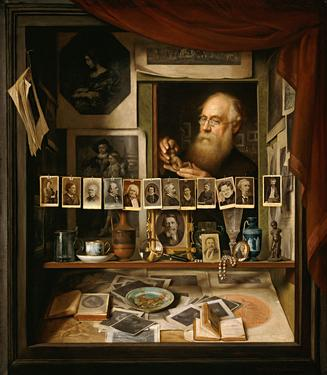
The Printseller's Window

This impressive work was also displayed provincially at various locations, including The Walker Art Gallery in Liverpool in 1883. It was offered for sale at the Liverpool Autumn Exhibition the same year, but priced at 315 pounds the painting did not find a buyer, causing the artist to re-exhibit it in 1884 at the Royal Scottish Academy. In April 1883, The London Daily Telegraph and Courier reported that Goodman was sending the painting to The Royal Academy. Other recorded provincial exhibitions which included The Printseller's Window are Folkestone Art Treasures Exhibition (1886) (together with his portrait of Wilkie Collins), Edinburgh Academy of Arts, and Goodman's own studio at 88 Kings Road in Brighton in 1891. The latest recorded date that The Printseller's Window was shown in Britain was at a show at the 19th Art Century Society in 1894, which prompted a withering review in The Pall Mall Gazette where the reviewer accused Goodman of affixing facsimiles of photographs to his painting. Goodman later responded in the press to this inaccurate criticism in equally withering terms.

Goodman eventually sold the painting to his father-in-law, the wine and spirit merchant William E. Blackiston, of Annesley House, Dyke Road, Brighton, England presumably in the late 1890s. It is unknown how long the painting remained with the Blackiston family.

The Printseller's Window was acquired by a Connecticut art dealer in 1965, and eventually by the Memorial Art Gallery of the University of Rochester in 1998.

The Printseller's Window is now considered an important example of its genre. The history of the painting and its ownership between the late 1890s and 1965 is unknown, and how it reached the United States is still a mystery.

The Printseller's Window was the subject of an exhibition, Walter Goodman's The Printseller's Window: Solving A Painter's Puzzle at the Memorial Art Gallery of the University of Rochester 14 August 2009 – 15 November 2009. A catalog of the exhibition has been published.

== Family ==
Walter Goodman was one seven children, amongst whom were Edward, the travel writer, author, and sub-editor of The Daily Telegraph, and Miriam, the acclaimed pianist who often accompanied Walter on his musical and dramatic stage outings.

Apart from living overseas for fourteen years, notably in Italy, Spain, Cuba, New York, and with family in Bradford and Edinburgh, Goodman lived with his parents and siblings at numerous central London addresses. In September 1887 he moved from Notting Hill, London, to Brighton, where he opened a studio on the premises of The Photographic Company at 88 Kings Road. The Photographic Company was the premises of the husband of his sister Alice – the photographer Edmund Passingham (represented in the National Portrait Gallery). While in Sussex, Goodman acted as the Brighton correspondent for The Sunday Times.

On 10 October 1888 Goodman married Clara Isabel Blackiston (b. 1866), originally from Ashby de la Zouch, Leicester, and later of Reigate, Surrey. They lived first in West Brighton (1888) then in Hove (1891). In 1892 Goodman is reported to be living in West Kensington, London, a necessity no doubt due to his appointment as press director of the International Horticultural Exhibition at Earls Court, London. In this capacity, Goodman was heavily involved in the staging of Buffalo Bill's Wild West show.

Walter and Clara had a son, Walter Russell in 1889, followed by Joaquin Sedgwick (1891), Reginald Arthur (1893), Julia Constance (1894) and Keeley John (1899).

Goodman probably left his family in Sussex and returned to live in London around 1900. The 1901 UK census lists Clara living as head of the family with the children at Henfield in Sussex. In 1911 Walter was living with his three eldest sons in Willesdon, London, whilst Clara was living in Chorleywood, Hertfordshire with their two youngest children.

== People I Have Painted ==
Between 11 February and 1 July 1893 Goodman contributed a weekly essay People I Have Painted to Sala's Journal. Each essay detailed the often humorous circumstances surrounding a particular painting or series of paintings Goodman had created.

The Emperor of the French

Around 1859 Goodman was commissioned to produce a series of seven large (six feet by four feet) panoramic views illustrative of the Italian war of 1859, most of which would feature The French Emperor, Napoleon III. Two of these works were to be transparencies, designed to be artificially lit from behind. Goodman recorded that his cleaning lady almost ruined some of these works due to her over-zealousness and his own forgetfulness. The Emperor never sat for Goodman in person – all paintings were executed with help of the many photographs of Napoleon III that were to be found in London at the time. The paintings were intended for a Continental show and were destined to be shipped to Odessa. Before this, the series was privately exhibited in the apartment where they had been painted. At the time of writing, in 1893, Goodman had no knowledge of the whereabouts of the seven paintings.

Prince Leopold

In 1881, at Goodman's request, Prince Leopold sat for him at his London studio. Goodman notes that prior to the Prince's visit on 5 February 1881, he requested that his cleaning lady make the studio extra tidy as he was expecting a prince. During the sitting the Prince's sister, Princess Louise, Duchess of Argyll, Marchioness of Lorne also paid a visit to Goodman's studio. Prince Leopold was in failing health and further sittings took place in the somewhat warmer surroundings of the Prince's apartments at Windsor Castle. Prince Leopold died in 1884, and in that year the painting was exhibited at the Guildhall.

Photograph of Prince Leopold painting taken from the privately pressed 1885 book Art in the City by Edward William Parkes

His Excellency Kuo Sung Tao

In 1878, Goodman was commissioned by the Chinese Ambassador to Great Britain and France to paint his portrait. The minister in question's family name was Kuo Sung-Tao, and he held the official title of Kuo Ta-Jen. Goodman writes of the difficulties experienced while attempting to capture his subject's grand attire. The sittings took place at Goodman's home at Notting Hill, London, and he notes the wonder and excitement of the local inhabitants at the arrival of the ambassador's carriages and at the exotic occupants delivered to his home. By having his portrait painted, Kou Sung-Tao incurred the wrath and ridicule of his countrymen back home. To such an extent in fact that he returned the portrait to Goodman and requested his money back – which Goodman declined to do. Goodman states that he informed His Excellency if it was against the customs of his country for a mandarin to have his portrait painted, it was not less at variance with the rigid rules of the outer barbarian to return money.

A Chinese Lady of Rank

The lady in question was one of the three wives of the Chinese ambassador. Her name was Kuo Tai-Tai. Goodman goes to great lengths to explain her exotic appearance and that of her small child, Ying-Sung. The (eighteen) sittings took place in 1879 at the Chinese legation at Portland Place, London (the present day Chinese embassy). Also described is a reception held at the embassy at which the prime minister of the day, William Ewart Gladstone, was present. The portrait was a group picture of Kuo Tai-Tai, her child Ying-Sung, and the child's nurse.

Mrs. Keeley at Fourscore, Jack Sheppard After Many Years, and The "Academy" Mrs. Keeley

Goodman indulges his obvious obsession with Mrs. Keeley by devoting the next three essays to her and the two portraits she sat for. Mrs. Keeley at Fourscore being the portrait that now hangs in The Garrick Club. Goodman describes how his sitter fell off her stool and badly injured her ankle. The Jack Sheppard essay refers to her famous portrayal of the notorious 18th-century burglar and is a continuation of the description of the sitting for The Garrick portrait. He notes that between the completion of this´and starting the next portrait, Mrs. Keeley requests him to paint a posthumous portrait of her late daughter, Louise who was married to Montagu Williams and died in 1877. The second Keeley portrait, also referred to as Mrs. Keeley in her 83rd Year is the one that was exhibited at The Royal Academy and subsequently hung in The Savage Club.

A Notable Spanish Artist

The notable Spanish artist being Mariano Fortuny, whom Goodman met in Florence in 1861. Goodman and Joaquin Cuadras struck up a friendship with the great Spanish artist in the early 1860s whilst they lived in Florence. Goodman relates how he sketched Fortuny without his knowledge, in 1861. Goodman says that Fortuny featured later on in a "rather large" composition of his – this is almost certainly a reference to The Printseller's Window. Goodman goes on to describe how the threesome visited the various bodegas around the Uffizi Palace. Their favourite haunt was Café Michael Angelo, in the Strada Nuova. The walls here were covered with al fresco murals, with the picture cord, nails and projected shadows formed by those objects, all of which were so accurately represented as to appear from a distance like the real thing. This early 1860s experience of the trompe-l'œil technique would be used to great effect by Goodman twenty years later with his masterpiece The Printseller's Window. Goodman's portrait of Fortuny was exhibited, along with The Printseller's Window and the Wilkie Collins portrait, at his Brighton studio in 1888.

My Cuban Companion

Goodman describes his first meeting with Joaquín Cuadras at the Uffizi Palace in Florence. He manages to overcome his initial suspicion of foreigners and they strike up a great friendship. They travel to Cuba and Europe together, with Cuadras settling in Scotland for three years. Goodman retained many of his own portraits of Cuadras. It can be safely assumed that Cuadras was Goodman's closest friend and he was devastated when Cuadras' life was cut short in January 1877 at the Spanish Hospital in Rome.

A British Consul of Barcelona

The novelist and journalist James Hannay sat for Goodman in Edinburgh in 1864. The picture was a three-quarter sized oil painting later displayed at the Roysl Scottish Academy, along with the David Smith painting. At the time Hannay sat for Goodman, he was editor of the Edinburgh Courant. Goodman's brother Edward was assistant editor at the Courant and had warned Goodman that Hannay was not very talkative. The ice was finally broken between the two when Hannay's son came along to the sitting. Goodman and Hannay became friends and he writes of sketching the group of guests at one of Hannay's many social gatherings. On this occasion the guests included John George Edgar, Sam Bough, David Smith, John Carmichael (classical master at Edinburgh High School), J. P. Steele (doctor and journalist), and Walter's brother, Edward. Goodman notes how this sketch was useful later when he painted Hannay and Smith. Hannay became vice-consul of Barcelona around 1868 – a position he held until his untimely death at the age of 46.

Author of the "Woman in White"

In contrast to James Hannay, Wilkie Collins was a very talkative, if less attractive (by his own admission) subject. The Collins portrait would take two years to complete. The sittings were interrupted by Goodman's severe illness in 1881 and Collins' own struggle with gout. Goodman moved temporarily to Broadstairs to recover, whilst Collins went to live in nearby Ramsgate. Goodman suggested they meet up, in either town, but Collins was reluctant to travel to Broadstairs as it reminded him too much of his dear departed friends and Broadstairs housemates, Charles Dickens and Augustus Egg. Goodman went to Ramsgate, where Collins related many a fascinating tale of his friendship with Dickens. For example, it was at Broadstairs that Dickens came upon the original aunt in David Copperfield. Some of Dickens' seafaring experiences were derived from chats with the old boatmen on the jetty. Prior to this portrait being exhibited at the Royal Society of British Artists, after Collins' death in 1889, it was privately shown at Goodman's studio to a number of Collins' personal friends. These included Georgina Hogarth and Mary Dickens. In his final letter to Goodman, Collins states I am very glad to hear that Miss Hogarth likes the portrait. Her favourable opinion is well worth having.

The Composer of "Cheer Boys Cheer"

At a garden party in Hammersmith an amateur sits down at the piano and entertains the guests. Goodman has no idea who the mysterious pianist is, so enquires of one of the guests, Mr. George Grossmith. Grossmith informs him that it is none other than Henry Russell, composer of Cheer Boys Cheer and The Ship on Fire. Goodman is subsequently introduced to Russell, which leads to him sitting for Goodman in Brighton around 1888. Russell regales Goodman with tales from the US – he had crossed the Atlantic 24 times at that point. As was usual with his sitters, Goodman and Russell became great friends. They spent many a pleasant evening at Russell's home in Maida Vale. Walter named his first born Walter Russell in his honour and Henry Russell repaid the honour by being Walter junior's godfather.

An Emancipated Slave

Soon after arriving in Santiago in 1864, Goodman and Cuadras opened an artist's studio, where they painted anything or anybody that presented itself. The studio was located in the hilly area of the city, now known as the Barrio el Tivoli, in the heart of the old town. In 1864, however, the area was a rather lonely quarter of the town with only one small row of houses and an open field opposite. One of Goodman's subjects was a former slave named Pancho Roblejo – who had since purchased his freedom. Roblejo intended the portrait to be a surprise gift to his intended. Employing rather dubious language (as he often does in these essays), Goodman describes how whitey-brown babies can be purchased here for fifty dollars. It transpired that another gentleman had purchased Roblejo's bride-to-be when she was born, and when she reached her early teens this person requested her hand in marriage.

The night in question was during carnival season and the locals were celebrating around the Plaza de Armas (present-day Parque Céspedes) until late into the night. Goodman retired early as he had the final sitting with Roblejo the next day. During the night Goodman was woken from his slumber by loud voices outside his window (which was simply a hole in the wall with iron bars to keep out intruders). This commotion is accompanied by a loud thud from inside the room – he assumed something had fallen from a shelf. This was followed by total silence, so Goodman fell asleep again. Next morning he was awakened by urgent knocking upon his door. The district police inspector, who Goodman knew as one of Cuadras' relatives, explained that there was a body lying half on the steps to his balcony and half on the road. The man had been murdered. And there, in the room, they discovered a heavy-handled knife covered with gore. Drops of blood were also found on some of Goodman's clothing. Amazingly, Goodman was not arrested for this crime, simply requested to report to the police station to leave a statement. It was assumed that the murderer had thrown the weapon through Goodman's window. The victim, was Pancho Roblejo – Goodman stated that he must have decided to turn up early for the final sitting. Roblejos had been seen that night arguing first with his love-rival, and later with a man who owed him a sum of money – and apparently this man was the culprit. In fact Roblejo's rival was instrumental in bringing the culrpit to justice. Goodman sent the completed portrait to the bereaved lady to whom it reportedly provided some consolation.

The Original "Negro Delineator"

This essay has a link to Goodman's painting Home of the Bamboo. He relates how, whilst enjoying a sociable afternoon at his good friend H.K.'s house in Winchmore Hill, H.K. recommends that he remain, in order to meet a mysterious guest who is on his way to visit. Research has revealed H.K. to be Horace Kollman Mayor, a stockbroker and prize-winning gardener. In 1882 Goodman gifts Home of the Bamboo to his friend H.K. Mayor as evidenced by the letter from Goodman attached to the back of the painting. The guest in question was E. W. Mackney, whom Goodman had already sketched and painted in the past. However, H.K, did not introduce the guest and Goodman did not recognise him, until he sat at the piano and began playing a well-known parody piece of the day.

A Popular Dramatist

Author and playwright Henry Pettitt is described by Goodman as being by far his worst sitter. During the difficult sittings Goodman learnt that Pettitt came to the stage at age 14 in a production at Sadler's Wells Theatre. Shortly after, Pettit gave up acting and trained as a teacher, later securing a position at the North London Collegiate School in Camden Town. Whilst there he wrote his first drama, entitled Golden Fruit in 1873. He continued to regale Goodman with stories of his many plays and successes at various theatres. Eventually, though, he falls into an almost trance-like state, awakening to recite lines from his various plays, oblivious to the fact that he was sitting for a portrait. This behaviour was repeated at every sitting. It must be assumed that Goodman was rather relieved when the work was completed.

The Last of a Famous Clown

Goodman was a great fan of the pantomime and Tom Matthews, born 1805, was his favourite pantomime clown. Goodman saw him many times in pantomime at the Drury Lane Theatre and at Covent Garden. Matthews was a rather frail faigure when Goodman painted him in 1888, suffering from asthma and bronchitis. By this time Matthews had been living in Brighton for the past 20 years. He made his stage debut at Christmas 1829 in The Hag and the Forest Raven, or Harlequin and the Persian Rose. Goodman relates how his subject is overcome with emotion when reminiscing about all his associates, such as Mrs. Keeley and Mrs Stirling. Matthews tells of his close relationship with Joseph Grimaldi and Grimaldi's son. In 1857, Matthews and his daughter, Madame Lawrence, gave a performance entitled 'Reminiscences of Grimaldi" which was very well received. Goodman completed a small pictorial souvenir of the clown with a view to a larger production later on. But this wasn't to be as Matthews died before it could be completed.

A Spanish Low Comedian

Goodman met the Spanish comedian Don Baltasar Torrecillas in Cuba, where Torrecillas was starring in a production at the Teatro de la Reina in Santiago (later named Oreinte, and now, sadly in ruins). Goodman produced 24 distemper portraits (or cartoons as he describes them) of the comedian and also painted the scenery for the theatre at which he starred. The paintings were produced in an improvised studio in the lobby of the theatre, where painter and subject engaged in long conversations about Torrecillas' theatrical calling. Goodman translated Box and Cox into Spanish for him and it was subsequently produced at the theatre, but under a different title.

A Great Italian Actor

Goodman first encountered Tommaso Salvini in the actor's native land. There, Goodman witnessed many of Salvini's performances and was greatly impressed. Later Goodman saw the great man in performances at Drury Lane and Covent Garden. He first met Salvini privately fourteen years later at a dinner at The Savage Club in May 1875, chaired by Mr. Charles Wyndham. Goodman was seated close to Salvini and his son, as he spoke Italian. They discussed Salvini's love of music, especially opera. When Goodman enquires of the actor's leading lady in Florence, Clematina Cazzola, he replies sadly that she is lost and was his wife and mother to his son.

An Artist in Italian Glass

The studio in which Goodman first painted Benvenuto Barrovier was unbearably warm, and situated in an outbuilding at the Venice in London Exhibition at London's Olympia (Goodman exhibited Printseller's Window at this exhibition). The heat was due to the furnaces that were kept burning day and night, enabling the Venetian craftsmen to carry out their trade in full view of the thousands of visitors. Goodman found the experience of painting in front of such large crowds, rather uncomfortable. The principle artists were the three Barrovier brothers – Benvenuto, Giuseppe, and Vittorio – said to be the linneal descendants of the original workers in Venetian glass many centuries before. The materials used in the preparation of the glass were a closely guarded secret. Goodman was not satisfied with his effort of depicting Benvenuto at work, so painted him at a sitting at Goodman's house. This painting was intended as a surprise gift for Benvenuto's wife back in Murano near Venice. Before returning to Venice, the brothers displayed their prowess and skill at Venetian glass-making at a private showing for the Royal Family.

A Knighted Newspaper Proprietor

The Knight in question is Sir Thomas Sowler, the proprietor of the Conservative Manchester Courier and the Manchester Evening Mail. Once again Goodman displays a certain prejudice. When he first meets Sir Thomas at a private dinner in Manchester, he is presented as Colonel Sowler. Goodman is somewhat disappointed, assuming he is mereley a soldier, as by Sowler's attire and presence Goodman assumed him to be a man of the aristocracy. However, he is later pleased to ascertain that Sowler is in fact knighted and a well-respected newspaper propieter, therefore worthy of Goodman's brush. Indeed, he made an unsuccessful bid for parliament for the Conservative party in 1886. Goodman goes on to paint Sir Thomas, his wife Lady Sowler, and their daughter Mabel. Mabel is not the ideal sitter, craving constant entertainment. Goodman creates a story for her about a game of whist. Eventually this develops into a 17-installment short story published in the Manchester Courier, entitled Romance of the Rubber.

== Later years ==
In 1890, Goodman taught art classes to ladies at Palmeiro Studios in Brighton and around the same time he painted a portrait of Brighton resident The Countess of Munster and this was exhibited in his Brighton Studio in 1891 together with The Printseller's Window and the Wilkie Collins portrait. He also exhibited a replica of his Chinese Ambassador portrait here the same year.

Also in 1891, Goodman tried to persuade The Garrick Club to purchase his portraits of Wilkie Collins and Mrs. Alfred Mellon, pledging half the proceeds to a fund to help relieve the financial difficulties of Robert Reece, who was severely ill. Presumably he failed in this effort as the whereabouts of these two paintings are unknown today.

Around probably 1898 Goodman was commissioned to travel to Poděbrady castle in Bohemia to paint the portrait of Prince Hohenlohe and that of his daughter Elisabeth. According to reports, both works were met with much success. During this trip, while staying at a hotel in Bad Kreuznach, he organized a firework display in honor of The Queen's birthday. He was assisted in this task by his son, Russell (godson of Henry Russell). Goodman is recorded as living in Bavaria during this period, until at least late 1902.

In 1901 Goodman authored a two-part article in the Magazine of Art entitled "Artists Studios: As They Were and As They Are." In the piece Goodman makes it clear that he was on familiar terms (at least enough so as to have been able to visit a number of their studios first hand) with many of the great painters of the Victorian Age, six of whom are portrayed in The Printseller's Window. The same year, Goodman submitted his portrait, The Late Mr. Wilkie Collins at the age of 56 to the National Portrait Gallery The submission included a photograph of the Collins portrait which remains in the collection of the gallery.

The Jewish Chronicle commissioned Goodman to draw a study of his mother, Julia Goodman on the occasion of her 90th birthday. It appeared on 7 June 1902 edition of that publication, and in Booklover's Magazine in February of the following year.

In 1906 Goodman exhibited a portrait of his son, Keeley, at the Institute of Oil Painters in London. At the Exhibition of Jewish Art and Antiquities at the Whitechapel Art Gallery, London in late 1906 he exhibited three works: The Late Sampson Lucas, Mrs Keeley in her 83rd year, and The Cuban Mulatto Girl.

From 1906 Goodman suffered from severe ill health, and was unable to continue painting. By 1908 he had fallen on hard times and in desperation wrote to the Jewish Chronicle asking for donations and financial assistance, giving his wife's Henfield address – even though by this time he had long returned to London and was being cared for by his three eldest sons at his final address in Priory Park Road, Willesden, London. However, in December the same year The Strand Magazine provided some welcome financial assistance by publishing his essay Drapery Figures.

Walter Goodman died from cancer on 20 August 1912, at a nursing home in West Hampstead. His funeral was held on 24 August and he is buried in Hampstead Cemetery, North London.

Walter Goodman's grave at Hampstead Cemetery

A small obituary appeared on 30 August 1912 in The Jewish Chronicle and a more extensive obituary appeared in the 7 September 1912 edition of The Brighton Gazette.

== Paintings and drawings ==
Title or subject	Date	Exhibited/sold	Present whereabouts
James Henry Cotton, Dean of Bangor	Probably 1851–1853		Unknown
Series of panoramic views of the Crimean war	Around 1856–1857	Commissioned by the US	Unknown
Doctoring the Cane		Liverpool Academy (1858) British Institution, London (1859) Annual Art Union Exhibition, Manchester (1859)	Unknown
Trail of Dr Simon Bernard in the assassination attempt of Napoleon III		Sir John Simon's house, 36 Tavistock Square, London (1858)	Unknown
Battle of Montebello, with 84th Regiment, headed by Colonel Cambuels and General Forey, attacking the Austrians	c. 1859	Private exhibition at the apartment of the artist (c. 1859). Soon after shipped to an exhibition in Odessa in present-day Ukraine.	Unknown
Attack and capture of the Bridge of Magenta by General Vinoy	c. 1859	Private exhibition at the apartment of the artist (c. 1859). Soon after shipped to an exhibition in Odessa in present-day Ukraine.	Unknown
The Emperor of The French at Solferino	c. 1859	Private exhibition at the apartment of the artist (c. 1859). Soon after shipped to an exhibition in Odessa in present-day Ukraine.	Unknown
Bivouac of French Troops at Alessandria	c. 1859	Private exhibition at the apartment of the artist (c. 1859). Soon after shipped to an exhibition in Odessa in present-day Ukraine.	Unknown
The Emperor Visiting the Wounded in Hospital	c. 1859	Private exhibition at the apartment of the artist (c. 1859). Soon after shipped to an exhibition in Odessa in present-day Ukraine.	Unknown
Reception of the Emperor and Count Cavour at Genoa	c. 1859	Private exhibition at the apartment of the artist (c. 1859). Soon after shipped to an exhibition in Odessa in present-day Ukraine.	Unknown
Peace Rejoicings at Milan, with the Cathedral brilliantly illuminated	c. 1859	Private exhibition at the apartment of the artist (c. 1859). Soon after shipped to an exhibition in Odessa in present-day Ukraine.	Unknown
Bible Stories		British Institution, London (1861)	Unknown
Interior of The Cathedral of San Lorenzo, Genoa		The Royal Scottish Academy (1861) The Liverpool Society of Fine Arts (1862)	Unknown
Il Monte della Croce, San Miniato, Florence		The Liverpool Society of Fine Arts (1862)	Unknown
Sketch of a social gathering at the Edinburgh home of James Hannay. Guests included Hannay, John George Edgar, Sam Bough, David Smith, John Carmichael, J. P. Steele, and Edward Goodman.	1864		Unknown
James Hannay, Esq.		Royal Scottish Academy (1864)	Unknown
David Smith	1864		Unknown
Head		Royal Scottish Academy (1864)	Unknown
Pancho Roblejo	1864		Unknown
Joaquin Cuadras	1864		Unknown
Don Baltasar Torrecillas (24 distemper sketches of the performer in different costumes)	1864		Unknown
The late daughter of Don Magin of Santiago, Cuba	1864–1869	Cuba	Unknown
The late Don Pancho Aguerro y Matos of Santiago, Cuba	1864–1869	Cuba	Unknown
Sabrina de la Torre	1868	Cuba	Unknown, but a photograph exists in a private collection in England
War scene: Miranda de Arga, June 25, 1834	1868	Santiago de Cuba	Unknown
War scene: Siege and blockade of Zaragoza, 1843	1868	Santiago de Cuba	Unknown
War scene: Deeds of Oporto, 1846	1868	Santiago de Cuba	Unknown
War scene: Campaign of Portugal, 1847	1868	Santiago de Cuba	Unknown
War scene: General Staff of Madrid, March 7, 1848	1868	Santiago de Cuba	Unknown
War scene: General Staff of Catalonia, May 17, 1848	1868	Santiago de Cuba	Unknown
War scene: Campaign of Italy, 1849	1868	Santiago de Cuba	Unknown
Sir Thomas Brassey (crayon)	1870	Normanhurst Court, Sussex (1870–?)	Unknown
Lady Anna Brassey (crayon)	1870	Normanhurst Court, Sussex (1870–?)	Unknown
The Brassey children (probably more than one portrait)	1870	Normanhurst Court, Sussex (1870–?)	Unknown
Thomas Brassey Esq. senior	1870	Normanhurst Court, Sussex (1870–?)	Unknown
Portrait of a Young Boy on a Horse	1870	Christie's South Kensington, London (July 1998)	Unknown
Mr Serjeant Simon MP		Royal Oak Hotel, Dewsbury, Yorkshire (1871)	Unknown
Evelyn, daughter of G. J. Reid esq.		Royal Academy (1871)	Unknown
Portrait of child holding a letter	1872	Lawrences Auctioneers, Somerset (2001) Dreweatts Auctioneers, Devon, (2002) Private collector Bristol, Somerset (2002–2005)	Private collection in the US
Master Nicholls	1872		Unknown, but a photograph exists in a private collection in England
Mr. N Birkenruth	1873		Unknown, but a photograph exists in a private collection in England
Mrs. N Birkenruth	1873		Unknown, but a photograph exists in a private collection in England
Young Castille		Winter Exhibition of Cabinet Pictures in Oil, The Dudley Gallery (1874)	Unknown
Voices of the Sea		Exhibition of Pictures by British and Foreign Artists, The French Gallery in Pall Mall (1874)	Unknown
Morning Work (also known as Cleaning Windows)		International Exhibition of Fine Arts (1876)	Unknown
The Language of the Face (drawing)		The Dudley Gallery (1876)	Unknown
A Factory Girl		The Dudley Gallery (1878)	Unknown
His Excellency Kuo Ta-Jen		Royal Academy (1878) The Walker Art Gallery (1879)	Unknown, but a photograph exists in a private collection in England
Madonna in Prayer (Commissioned copy of Sassofferato's work)		Chinese Embassy, London (1878) Berlin, Germany after 1879	Unknown
A Chinese Lady of Rank		Windsor Castle (1879) Royal Academy (1879)	Unknown, but a photograph exists in a private collection in England
Portrait of a Chinese lady in native attire. (Kuo Tai-Tai – the wife of Kuo-Ta-Jen – with her new son, Ying-Sung, and the child's nurse)	1879		Taken to China by Kuo Ta-Jen soon after it was completed. Unknown
Major General William Yorke-Moore	1879		The Keep Military Museum, Dorchester, Dorset, England
The Late Mr. Wilkie Collins at the age of 56 (also known as Wilkie Collins)	1880	Folkestone Art Treasures Exhibition (1886) The Royal Society of British Artists (1890) Goodman's Studios at 88 Kings Road, Brighton (1891)	Unknown, but a photograph exists in the archives of the National Portrait Gallery, London.
Self-portrait	1880	Walter Goodman's The Printseller's Window: Solving A Painter's Puzzle, The Lockhart Gallery of the Memorial Art Gallery of the University of Rochester, New York, US (2009)	Memorial Art Gallery of the University of Rochester, New York, US
HRH Prince Leopold		Royal Academy (1881) Exhibition of City of London Society of Artists, The Guildhall (1884) Manchester Institution (1884) Malborough House (1884) Prince Leopold Wing of The National Hospital in London (1884–?)	Unknown
A Kitchen Cabinet	1882	Walter Goodman's The Printseller's Window: Solving A Painter's Puzzle, The Lockhart Gallery of the Memorial Art Gallery of the University of Rochester, New York, US (2009)	Private collection in the US
Home of The Bamboo	c. 1882	Walter Goodman's The Printseller's Window: Solving A Painter's Puzzle, The Lockhart Gallery of the Memorial Art Gallery of the University of Rochester, New York, US (2009)	Private collection in Sweden
The Printseller's Window	c. 1882	St. James's Gallery, London (1883) The Walker Art Gallery (1883) Liverpool Autumn Exhibition (1883) Royal Scottish Academy (1884) Burlington Gallery, Bond Street (1884) Folkestone Art Treasures Exhibition (1886) Edinburgh Academy of Arts (c. 1886) Goodman's Studios at 88 Kings Road, Brighton (1891) British and Foreign Art Galleries Section, Earls Court (1891) Venice in London Exhibition, Olympia (1891) The Grosvenor Club, London (1892) 19th Century Art Society Exhibition, London (1894) Collection of William E Blackiston, Brighton, UK (c. 1895-?) Tillou Gallery, Connecticut, US (1965) Newport, Rhode Island, US (arr. Tillou) (1965) Alexander Gallery, New York, US (1969) Masco Corporation, Taylor, Michigan, US (1986) The Art Museum of Western Virginia, Roanoke, Virginia, US (1986) The American Spirit: 19th Century Masterpieces from the Masco Collection (1994) Sotheby's, New York, US (1998) Permanent collection of the Memorial Art Gallery of the University of Rochester, New York, US (1998) National Gallery of Art, Washington, D.C., US (2002–2003) Walter Goodman's The Printseller: Solving A Painter's Puzzle, The Lockhart Gallery of the Memorial Art Gallery of the University of Rochester, New York, US (2009)	Memorial Art Gallery of the University of Rochester, New York, US
Fresh and Pure (also known as Pure and Undefiled)	1882	St. James's Gallery, London (1883) Studio 185, Cornwall Road, Notting Hill, London (1883) Halmstad Auktionskammare, Sweden (2017) Bonhams, London (2017)	Private collection in Sweden
Candidate for the Front Row (also known as First at the Gallery Door)		St. James's Gallery, London (1883)	Unknown
Andrew Halliday (drawing)	1883	Savage Club, London (1883)	Unknown
At The Theatre Door	1883	Heritage Auctions, Dallas USA (2011)	Private collection in Sweden
Idle Dreams		City of London Society of Artists (1884)	Unknown
In Possession		City of London Society of Artists (1884)	Unknown
Longing Eyes		Liverpool Autumn Exhibition (1884)	Unknown
Mrs. Alfred Mellon	1884	Goodman's Studios at 88 Kings Road, Brighton (1891)	Unknown
Mrs. Keeley at Fourscore	1884	Institute of Oil Painters (1885) Burlington Gallery, Bond Street (1885) Presented to The Garrick Club (1886) Signor Palladiense Gallery, London (1887) Hennah and Kent's Studio, Old Kent Road, London (1887)	The Garrick Club, London
Mrs. Keeley at Fourscore (drawing for Pall Mall Gazette)	1885		Unknown
The Golden Valley (landscape of Chalford valley)	1884–1885	Collection of Mr. Charles Smith (1886) Chalford National School Bazaar (August 1886)	Unknown
The Golden Valley (second landscape of Chalford valley)	1884–1885	Collection of Mr. Charles Smith (1886) Chalford National School Bazaar (August 1886)	Unknown
Mr G. Holloway (drawing)	1884	Chalford Branch of the Stroud Working Men's Conservative Association Benefits Society (1885)	Unknown
Untitled painting of actor Charles Arnold's 2-year-old baby daughter in the stage production My Sweetheart.	1886	Sent to California after completion	Unknown
Fanny Stirling		Presented to The Garrick Club (1886) Signor Palladiense Gallery, London (1887) Hennah and Kent's Studio, Old Kent Road, London (1887)	The Garrick Club, London
Grace Darling		Signor Palladiense Gallery, London (1887)	Unknown
Louise Keeley(Mrs. Montague Williams, Q.C.)	c. 1887		Unknown
Fanny Stirling (head and bust)	1888		Private collection in Sweden
Tom Matthews	1888		Unknown
Mrs. Keeley in her 83rd year (also known as The Academy Keeley)		Goodman's Studios at 88 Kings Road, Brighton (1888) Royal Academy (1888) The Savage Club (1888 or later) Exhibition of Jewish Art and Antiquities, The Whitechapel Art Gallery, London (1906)	Unknown
Marià Fortuny		Goodman's Studios at 88 Kings Road, Brighton (1888)	Unknown
Mr Henry Russell (also known as Henry Russell at 77)		Institute of Oil Painters (1889) Presented to The Savage Club (1890) Japanese Gallery, London (1897) Exhibition of Dramatic and Musical Art, The Grafton Galleries, London (1897)	Unknown
Amy Sedgwick	1889	Presented to The Garrick Club (1897), deaccessioned in 1965	Unknown
Mr. Lionel Brough		Institute of Oil Painters (1889)	Unknown
Kathleen		Institute of Oil Painters (1889)	Unknown
Dolly (crayon)		St. James's Gallery, London (1889)	Unknown
His Excellency Kuo Ta-Jen (replica of original)		Goodman's Studios at 88 Kings Road, Brighton (1891)	Unknown
Countess of Munster		Goodman's Studios at 88 Kings Road, Brighton (1891)	Unknown
Untitled children in black and white (drawing)		Goodman's Studios at 88 Kings Road, Brighton (1891)	Unknown
Untitled children in black and white (second drawing)		Goodman's Studios at 88 Kings Road, Brighton (1891)	Unknown
Benvenuto Barovier at work	1891		Unknown
Benvenuto Barovier (head and bust)	1891		Unknown
Prince Hohenlohe	Late 1890s	Poděbrady, Bohemia	Unknown
Prince Hohenlohe's daughter, Elisabeth	Late 1890s	Poděbrady, Bohemia	Unknown
Julia Goodman (drawing)	1902		Private collection in England
Young Keeley	1905	Institute of Oil Painters (1906)	Private collection in England
The Late Mr. Samson Lucas		Exhibition of Jewish Art and Antiquities, The Whitechapel Art Gallery, London (1906)	Unknown
The Cuban Mulatto Girl		Exhibition of Jewish Art and Antiquities, The Whitechapel Art Gallery, London (1906)	Unknown
Mary Anne Keeley			Private collection in England
Mrs. Cornwallis-West			Private collection in Sweden
Untitled portrait of a young woman possibly entitled Beguiling Eyes			Private collection in England
Untitled portrait of a young woman in period clothes with ruff			Private collection in England
Untitled portrait of a young boy			Private collection in England
Untitled portrait of a young girl			Private collection in England
Alfred, Duke of Edinburgh			Unknown
E. W. Mackney			Unknown
Benvenuto Salviati			Unknown
Tommaso Salvini			Unknown
Don Baltasar Torrecillas			Unknown
Henry Pettit			Unknown
Sir Thomas Sowler			Unknown
Lady Sowler			Unknown
Miss Mabel Sowler			Unknown
George Macfarren			Unknown
Julia Goodman			Unknown

Dates specified are the earliest recorded date the work was displayed, or in some cases the year it was completed.

== Books ==
Walter Goodman wrote these books:

- Pearl of The Antilles or An Artist in Cuba, London: H.S.King & Co. 1873 (reprinted in 1986 as Un Artista en Cuba. Letras Cubanas (Col. Testimonio). La Habana.) Available here at gutenberg.org
- The Keeleys on Stage and at Home, London: Bentley and Son 1895

== Other publications ==
Walter Goodman is known to have contributed to many books, periodicals, and publications. These have so far been identified:

- A Cigarette Manufacturer at Havana, London Society (1872)
- General Tacon's Judgment, Daily Pacific Tribune (Vol. VII, No. 60, 24 December 1872)
- Sketches of Santiago, The Graphic (1873)
- Various sketches and stories, All The Year Round (1873)
- Saved From a Wreck, Cassell's Magazine (1874)
- Cuba Without a Master, Cassell's Magazine (1874)
- A Holiday in Cuba, Cassell's Magazine (1874)
- Tomasso Salvino (cover engraving), Pictorial World (1875)
- The Pictorial World (cover drawing The Language of the Face) (1876)
- The Russian Peasantry, Illustrated London News (28 April 1877)
- A Little Baggage, Illustrated London News (Christmas Number, 1877)
- A Little Baggage, Illustrated Christian Weekly (July 1878)
- God is taking care of me, Three Brown Boys and Other Happy Children – Ellen Haile (1879)
- Little Mother, Little Folks. A Magazine for the Young, Cassell, Petter, Galpin & Co. (1881)
- Floy's first flight, The One Syllable Book – Emma E. Brown (1879)
- Mrs. Keeley at Fourscore (drawing) Pall Mall Gazette, 29 July 1885
- Obedient Bessie, Little Ramblers and Other Stories. By favorite American authors (Cassell) (1885)
- An English Ballet in Spain, The Theatre (1885)
- Art Behind the Curtain, The Theatre (1886)
- An Englishman on the Spanish Stage, The Theatre (1886)
- Box and Cox in Spanish, The Theatre (1886)
- Art Behind the Curtain, The Stage (1887)
- Untitled drawing of children Cassell's Magazine (c. 1888)
- The adventures of a young artist in and around Birmingham, unknown (1892)
- People I Have Painted, Sala's Journal (1893)
- Artists Studios: As They Were and As They Are, Magazine of Art (1901)
- Julia Goodman (drawing), Jewish Chronicle, 7 June 1902
- Julia Goodman (drawing), Booklover's Magazine, February 1903
- Drapery Figures The Strand Magazine (1908)
- Romance of the Rubber, The Manchester Courier (date unknown)

== Ancestry ==
Ancestors of Walter Goodman (artist)

16.
8.
17.
4. Abraham Goodman
18.
9.
19.
2. Louis Goodman
20.
10.
21.
5. Rosa
22.
11.
23.
1. Walter Goodman
24.Salaman Salaman
12.Samuel Salaman
25.
6. Simeon Kensington Salaman
26.
13.Julia Pythe
27.
3. Julia Salaman
28.
14.Henry Cowan
29.
7. Alice Cowan
30.
15.Rachel Samuel
31.
