= Joaquín Cuadras =

Cuban painter

Joaquin Cuadras
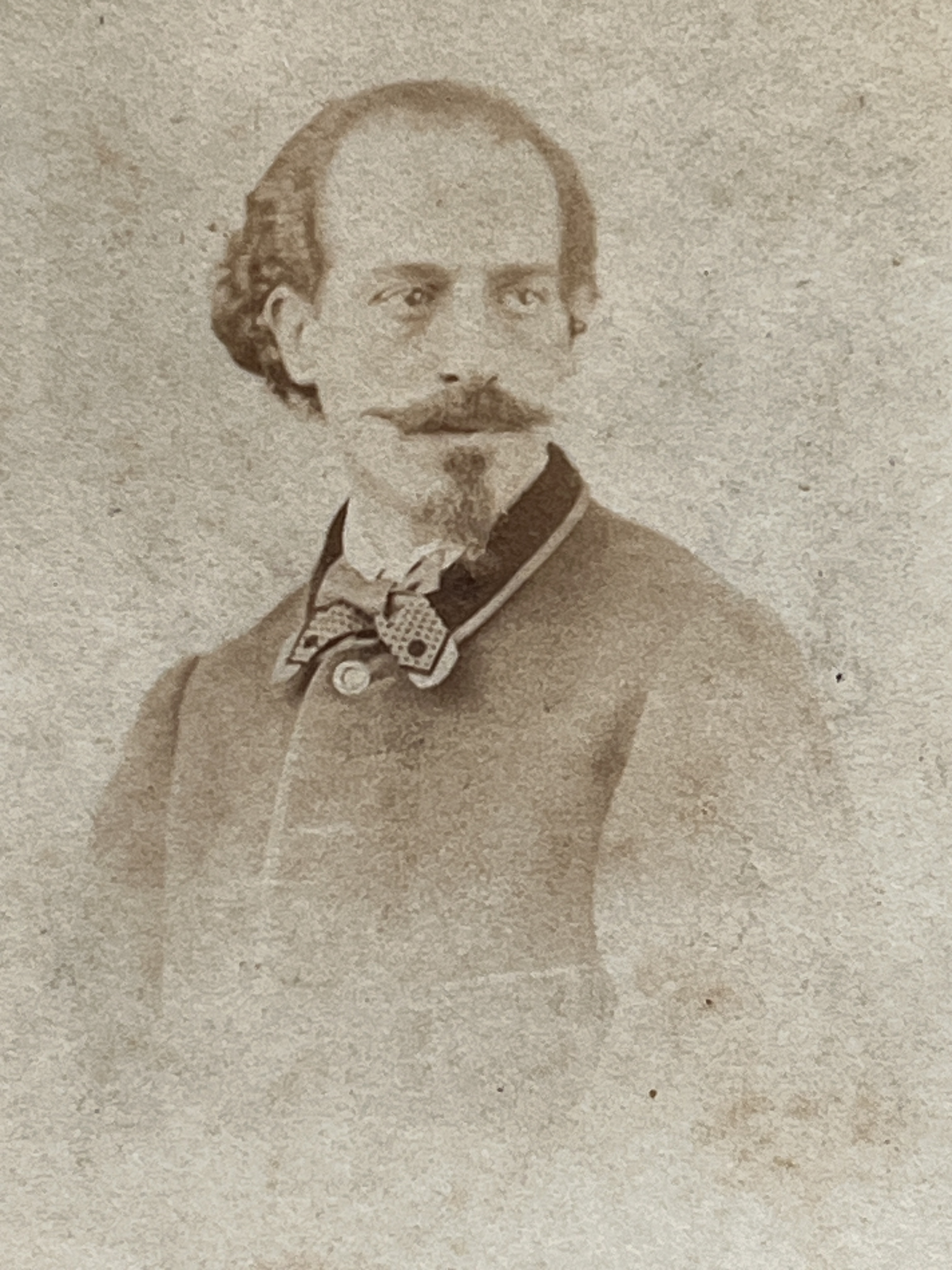
- Born: 19 May 1843; Santiago de Cuba
- Died: 27 January 1877 (aged 33); Rome, Italy
- Education: Antonio Ciseri's art school, Florence
- Known for: Painting, drawing
- Notable work: Mulatto Girl's Toilette, a Scene in Cuba; Return From The Christening - A Scene in Venice
- Patrons: Mr. William Brown, Selkirk. Mr. W. Ballantyne, Walkerburn.

Joaquín Cuadras (Joaquín Torcuato Cuadras Sagarra (1843–1877) was a Cuban painter.

He was the son of Maria Josefa Sagarra Blez and Joaquin Cuadras Fontanals, who were an affluent family from Santiag of Catalan origin.

He attended the art school of Antonio Ciseri in Florence. In 1861, Cuadras met fellow artist Walter Goodman whilst copying Old Master paintings at the Uffizi Palace in Florence, and the two became friends. They travelled to Barcelona in 1862 and arrived in London a year later. In 1864, he sat for Walter Goodman's mother, the portrait painter Julia Goodman.

In 1864 Cuadras and Goodman travelled to Rome and then on to Saint-Nazaire in France where, on 16th April 1864, they set sail on the French steamer Veracruz to the West Indies, arriving in Santiago, Cuba on 9 May at 9.30 am or 10 May 1864.

Upon arrival in Santiago, they lodged with Cuadras' sister, Amalia, at 113 Enramadas Street. A month later, they rented a house on Santa Rosa Street, in the Tivoli district, and installed a studio there. Most of Goodman's time in the West Indies was spent in Santiago and Havana, Cuba, working as an artist and journalist and painting theatrical sets. He also appeared in many stage productions, putting his fluency in Spanish to good use.

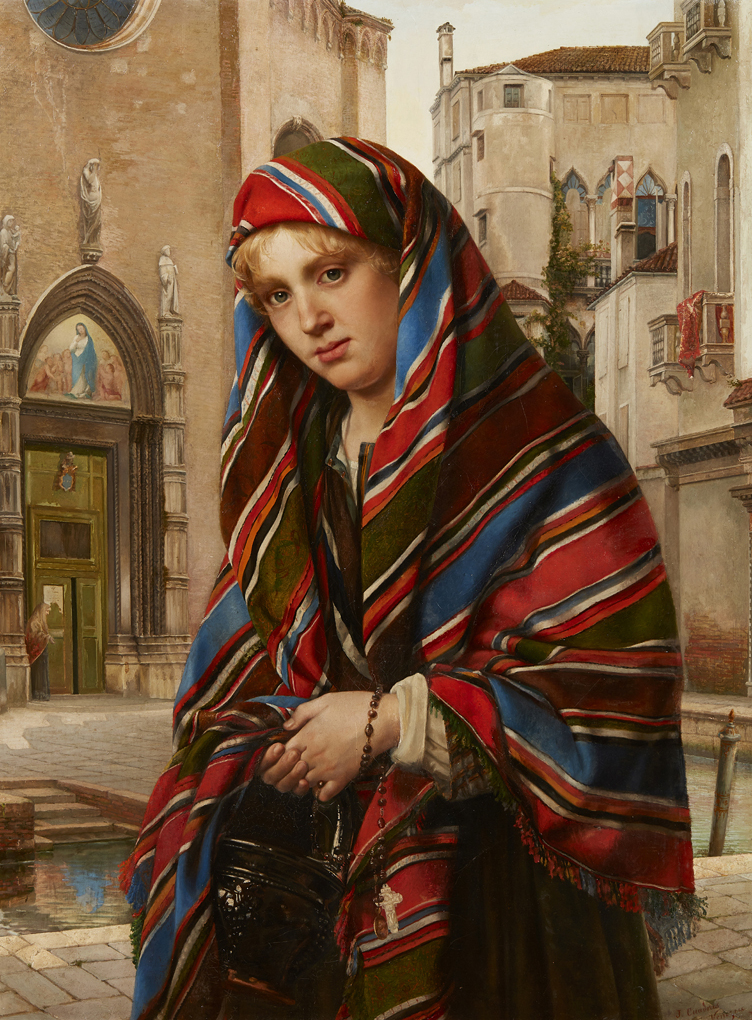
The Red Shawl (Venice).

After returning from Cuba in 1870, Cuadras moved to Selkirk, Scotland for three years, where he found work decorating mansions for the Scottish elite. One of his most important commissions was a series of eight-panel pictures illustrating Sir Walter Scott's The Lay of the Last Minstrel. While in Scotland, Cuadras fathered a daughter with Elizabeth Christison in 1872. He named her Maria Josefita Cuadras, and she died in 1960 in Edinburgh.

William Christison, father of Elisabeth Christison. Charcoal drawing by Joaquin Cuadras.

Many of his best works were exhibited at galleries in Glasgow and Edinburgh.

Cuadras was represented at the Royal Academy in 1872 by his painting Mulatto Girl's Toilette, a Scene in Cuba (sold at Sotheby's, New York in 2010) and the following year he contributed two engravings The Cuban Lovers and The Mulatto Girl to The Graphic magazine. In 1874, he exhibited Return the Christening, a painting of a scene in Venice with a christening party landing from a gondola, at the International Exhibition of Fine Arts in London. This painting is currently in the collection of The General Hospital, Jersey.

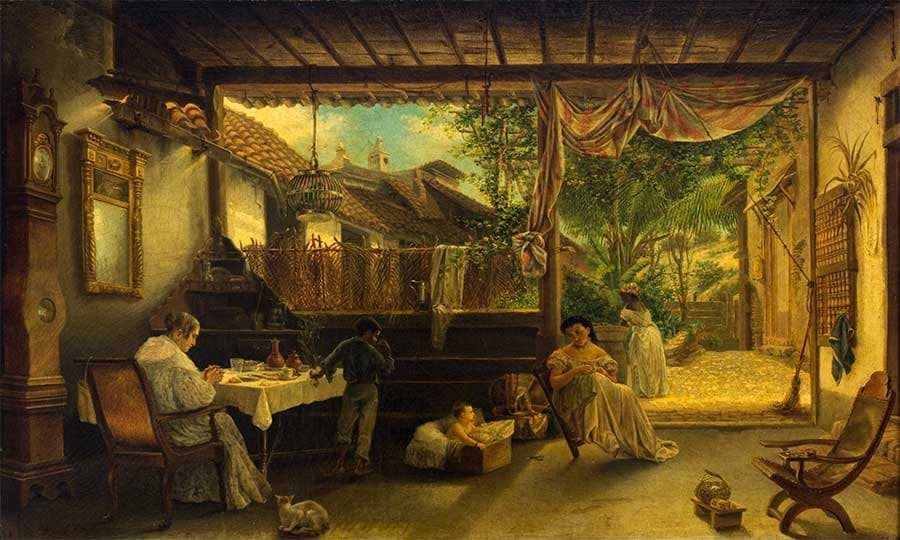
Patio interior en Santiago de Cuba.

Between 1868 and 1869 Cuadras was director of Academia de Dibujo de Santiago de Cuba. In 1876 he won a silver medal in an exhibition at Liceo Artístico y Literario de La Habana. He won a bronze medal in 1877 in the los juegos florales of the Liceo de Matanzas. Four of his notable Cuban works were Como de Médicis, Río Baconao, Orfila Coronado Por Una Diosa (1874), and Lección de Anatomía - the whereabouts of which are unknown today. There are examples of Cuadras' work in the Museo Bacardi in Santiago de Cuba and the Museo Nacional de Bellas Artes in Havana.

A Cuban scene.

Cuadras suffered from ill health throughout his short life, falling ill in Scotland and Cuba. In December 1876 he wrote to his great friend, Walter Goodman, from Venice, where he was confined to bed by his doctor. He appears to be seriously ill at this point but hopes to finish his large painting El Siroco, which he hopes will alleviate his financial woes. He also reminisces warmly about his wealthy benefactor, Mr William Brown, of Selkirk, Scotland. Cuadras provided paintings to adorn the walls of his billiard room in Selkirk.

An excerpt from the letter, dated 20 December 1876: Here I am still in Venice because of this cursed weather. It is not the moment to finish my large painting El Siroco, since in it I have placed all my hopes.

He planned to travel to Majorca to fully recover from his latest ailment, but sadly this was not to be. Joaquin Cuadras died in Rome five weeks after writing the letter, on 27 January 1877.

The whereabouts of the unfinished painting, El Siroco, is unknown.
