= Rose Emma Salaman =

English poet and translator

- Born: c. 1815; St Martin-in-the-Fields, London, United Kingdom
- Died: 23 December 1898; St Pancras, London, United Kingdom
- Spouse: Judah Collins (m. 1857)
- Writing career
- Pen name: R. E. S.

Rose Emma Salaman (also Collins; c. 1815 – 23 December 1898) was an English poet and translator.

She was born in London to Jewish parents Alice (née Cowen) and Simeon Kensington Salaman. Her thirteen siblings included Charles Kensington, Rachel, Annette, and Julia Salaman. On 12 May 1857, she married Judah (Julius) Collins, a surgeon and warden of the Western Marble Arch Synagogue, whose brother was architect Hyman Henry Collins.

Salaman's work appeared in numerous British and American periodicals during the 1840s and 1850s, including Isaac Leeser's Occident and American Jewish Advocate. Her only published volume of poetry was Poems by R. E. S. (1853), dedicated to physiologist Marshall Hall. The work was well-received by critics, and was reportedly the only book accepted by Queen Victoria in the year of mourning following Prince Albert's death in 1861.

== Bibliography ==
- Poems by R. E. S. London: Edward Churton. 1853.
