= Sydney Starr =

English painter

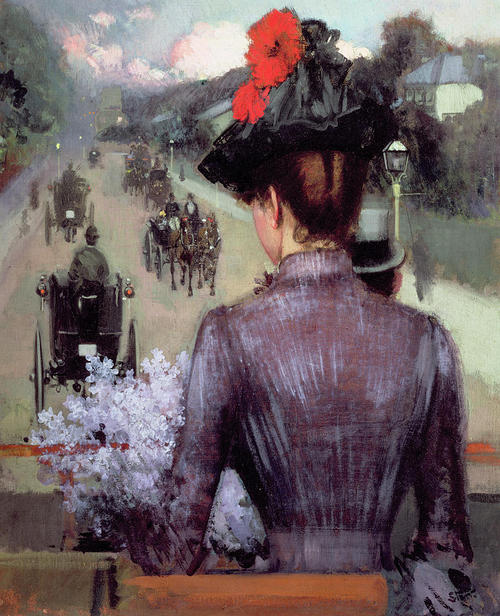
The City Atlas, 1888–1889

Sidney Starr (Kingston upon Hull 10 June 1857 – New York City, 3 March 1925) was an English Impressionist painter who spent the latter part of his career in the United States. In addition to urban and parkland scenes, he also did portraits.

== Life and work ==
Starr did his studies at the Slade School of Fine Art, where Edward Poynter and Alphonse Legros were among his teachers. In 1874, the school awarded him their prestigious scholarship. From 1882 to 1886, he exhibited at the Royal Academy. His early works were influenced by James McNeill Whistler, in whose studio he worked.

When Whistler left the Royal Society of British Artists in 1888, after a disagreement about the organization's future, he took several of his associates, including Starr, Walter Sickert, Philip Steer and Theodore Roussel. Starr then joined Sickert's New English Art Club, and began painting in a more Impressionistic style. In 1889, he participated in an exhibition at the Goupil Gallery in Paris, which introduced English-style Impressionism to the French. Later that year, he won a bronze medal at the Exposition Universelle for his depiction of Paddington Station. His most famous work is "The City Atlas", which can be found in most works on English Impressionism.

In 1892, following the collapse of an affair with the wife of his biggest patron, he emigrated to New York, where his work was popular among collectors. He soon received several commissions, including murals for the chapel in Grace Church and 24 paintings for what is now called the Simmons Corridor at the Thomas Jefferson Building of the Library of Congress in Washington, DC.

He died in 1925 at the age of sixty-two. Some of his works can be seen in the Tate Gallery in London and the National Gallery of Canada.

== Gallery ==
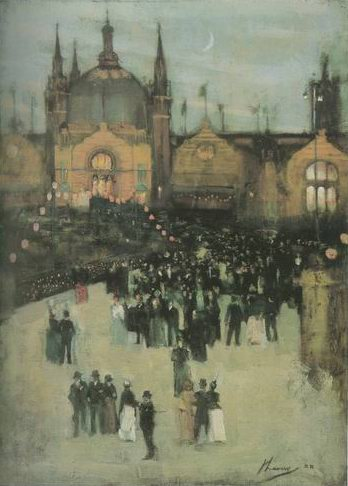
Paddington Station

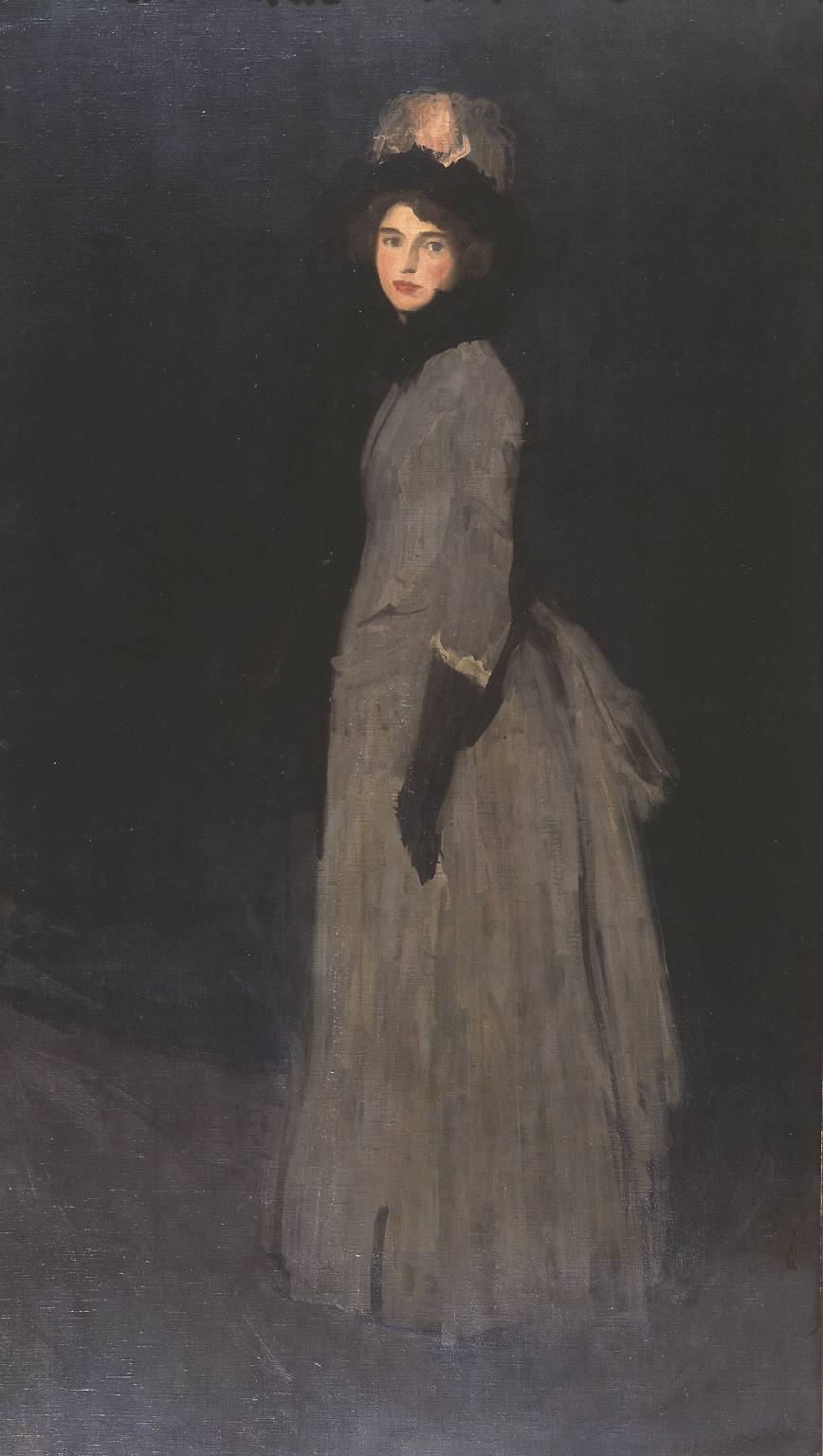
Study in
Blue and Gray

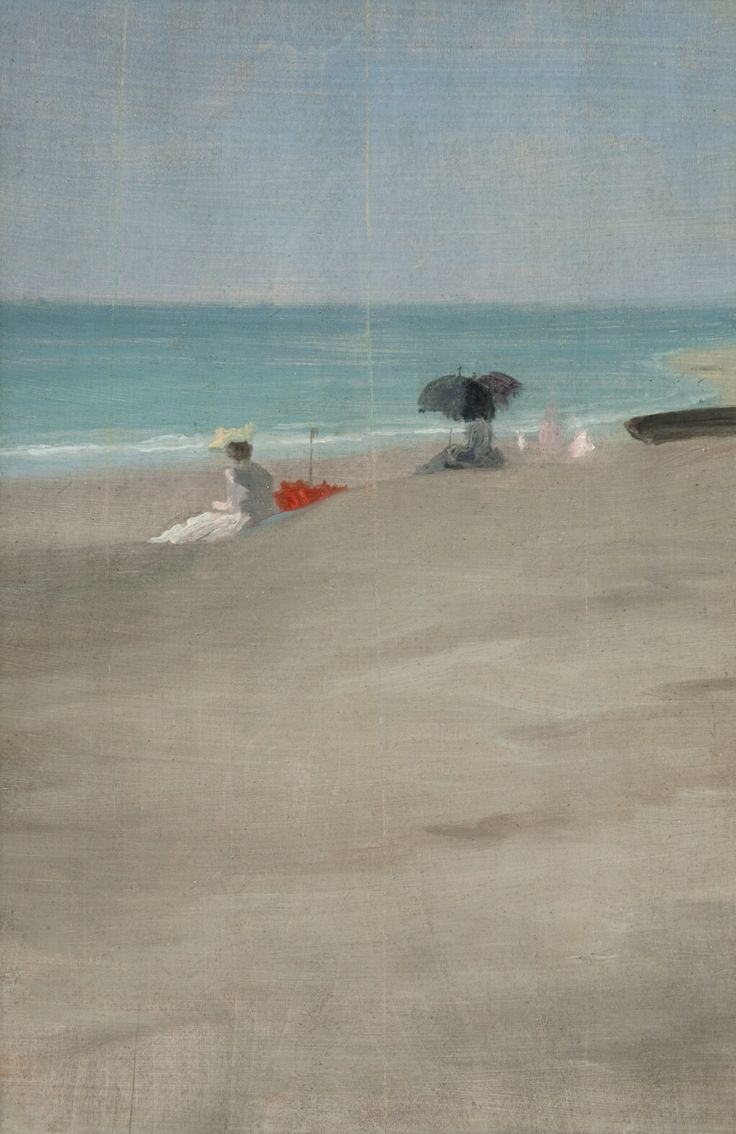
Figures at the Seashore

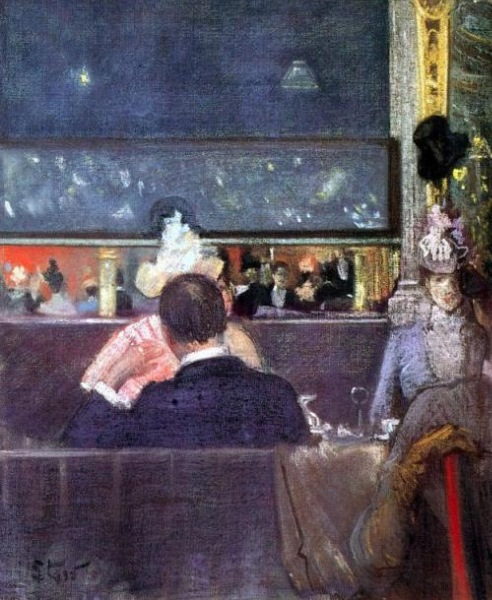
Café Royal

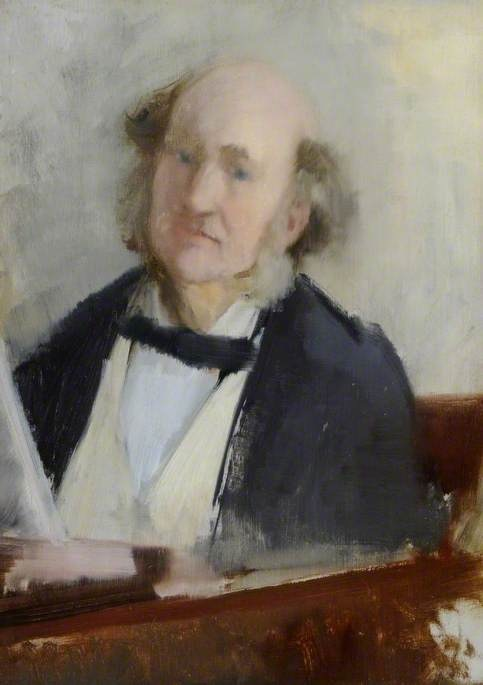
Portrait of Charles Kensington Salaman
