= Bernard Lens I =

Dutch painter and writer of religious treatises

Bernard Lens I (c.1630–1707) was a Dutch painter and writer of religious treatises.

Lens was born in the Netherlands, and later moved to England. He primarily painted miniatures, practicing enamel techniques. His son Bernard Lens II and grandson Bernard Lens III also grew up to become artists in their own right.
