= Lense =

Lense may refer to:

- Incorrect spelling of lens (disambiguation) for topics related to optics lens, or metaphorically related

== People ==
"Lense" can be a surname of German language origin. People with this surname include:

- Benjamin Lense (born 1978), German footballer
- Josef Lense (1890–1985), Austrian physicist
- Sascha Lense (born 1975), German footballer

=== Fictional characters ===
- Elizabeth Lense, a fictional Star Trek character, see List of Star Trek characters (G–M)

== See also ==
- Lens (disambiguation)
