= Lén =

Person in Irish mythology

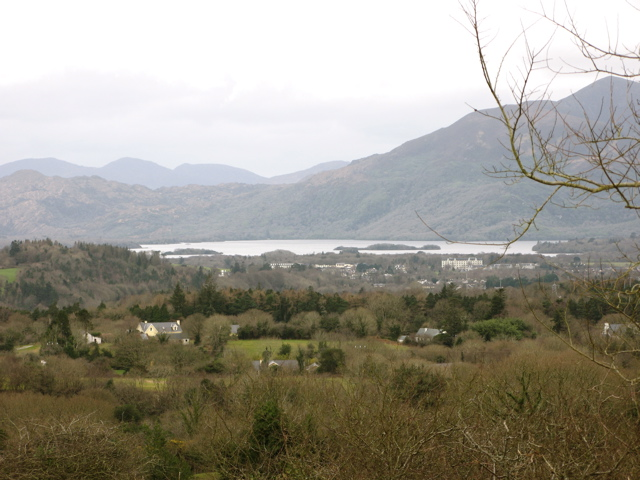
A view of Loch Léin (middle distance). The mountains are MacGillycuddy's Reeks

In Irish mythology, Lén was the craftsman of Síd Buidb, the 'sídhe of Bodb'. The son of Ban Bolgach son of Bannach, he was said to reside under a lake near Killarney named Loch Léin after him. The Dindsenchas relate that Loch Léin was where he would make bright vessels for Fand the Long-Haired, the daughter of Flidais. Every night, after finishing his work, it is written that he used to fling his anvil away to a nearby hill called the Indeoin na nDési or 'Anvil of the Dési' and the showers that came from the back of the hill were said to be pearls off his anvil as it was flung. Whether the name Lén can be philologically related to the Romano-Celtic god Lenus is disputable. While the meaning of the name is uncertain, the Old Irish words lén 'defeat, misfortune' and lénaid 'injure, wound' and the Welsh llwyn 'grove, bush, shrub' may offer some basis for comparison.
