= Bernard Lens II =

English engraver

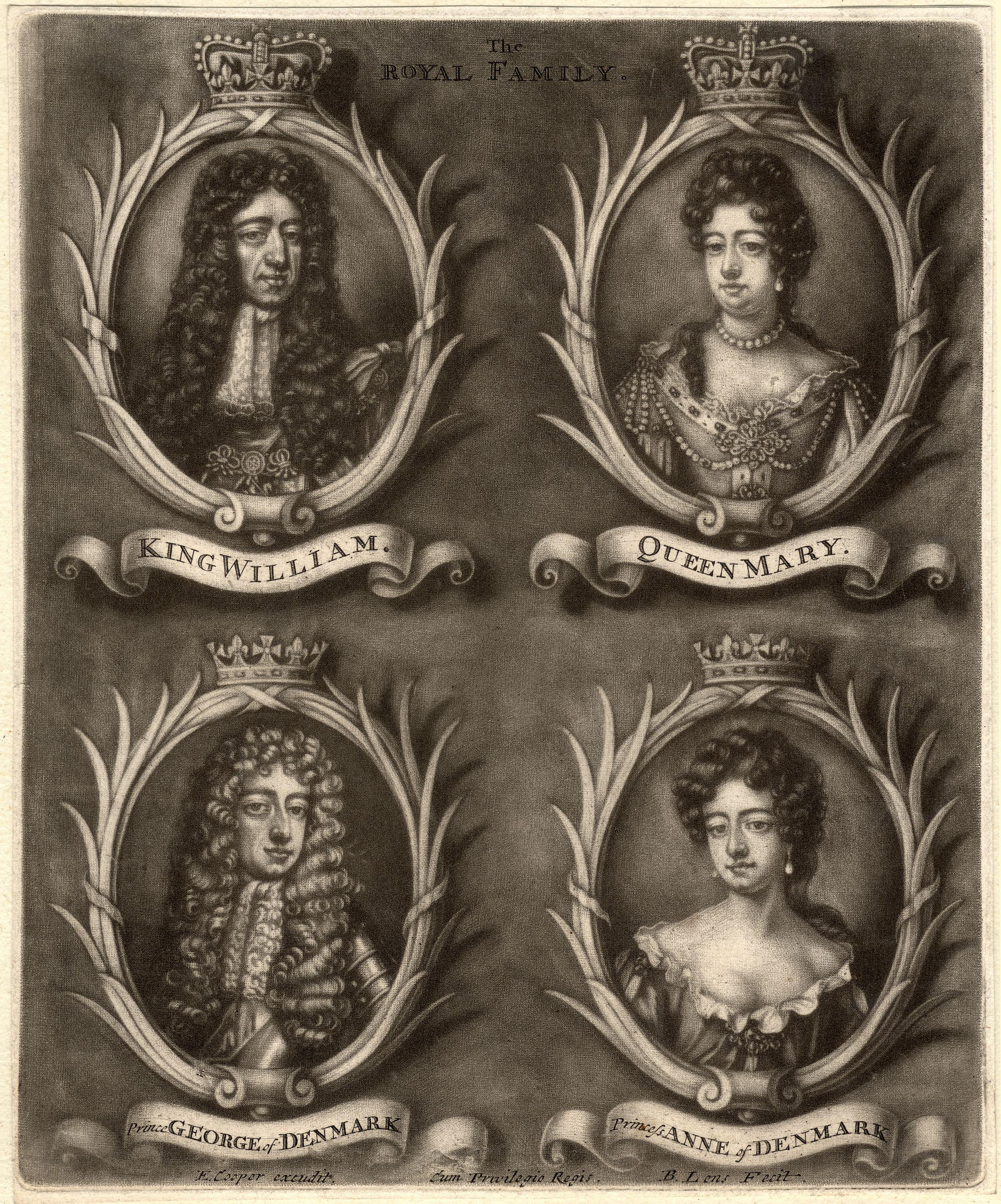
The Royal Family of king William III, by Bernard Lens II

Bernard Lens II (1659–1725) was an English engraver, pioneer of mezzotint technique, and publisher.

Bernard Lens II was the son of Bernard Lens I, "an obscure painter" of Dutch origin. Bernard Lens I practiced enamel technique and also authored religious treatises.

The art of Bernard Lens II, largely confined to developing mezzotint technique is an example of a general trend of hist age, when "issues of tonality, if not colour, were developing away from the etching's dependence on line". According to Malcolm Charles Salaman, "most attractive" of his portraits was that of Lady Mary Tudor. Salaman noted Lens for his "practically unique" insights into capabilities of mezzotint in rendering artificial light, evidenced by his series of Fireworks. These prints, commemorating the victories of the Williamite War in Ireland, were "the essential component of representational amplification in politics" of the period.

Bernard Lens II was the father of better known miniaturist Bernard Lens III. Father and son collaborated on joint projects, for example during the 1710 tour of Native American chiefs to England. On the last day of their stay in London Bernard Lens III produced miniature portraits of the "Four Kings"; Bernard Lens II copied these portraits in mezzotint, including a widely copied leaflet presenting all four portraits.

== Sources ==
- Coombs, Katherine (2004). "Lens [Laus] family". In Matthew, H. C. G. & Harrison, Brian (eds.). Oxford Dictionary of National Biography. Vol. 33. Oxford, New York: Oxford University Press. pp. 380–382. ISBN 0-19-861383-0. OCLC 1035759110 – via the Internet Archive.
- Salaman, Malcolm C. (1906). The Old Engravers of England in Their Relation to Contemporary Life and Art (1540-1800). London et al.: Cassell and Co. pp. 81–87, 97, 177. OCLC 1049965266 – via the Internet Archive.
- Salaman, Malcolm C. (1917). Holme, Charles (ed.). The Graphic Arts of Great Britain. London: The Studio. p. 96. OCLC 1045564078 – via the Internet Archive.
- Sloan, Kim (1996). "Lens". In Turner, Jane (ed.). The Dictionary of Art. Vol. 19. New York: Grove's Dictionaries. p. 165. ISBN 1-884446-00-0. OCLC 1033643331 – via the Internet Archive.
- Vaughan, Alden T. (2006). Transatlantic encounters: American Indians in Britain, 1500-1776. Cambridge University Press. ISBN 0521865948.
- Worrall, David (2006). Theatric revolution: drama, censorship and Romantic period subcultures 1773-1832. Oxford University Press. ISBN 0199276757.
