= Rachel Simon, Lady Simon =

English author

Lady Simon
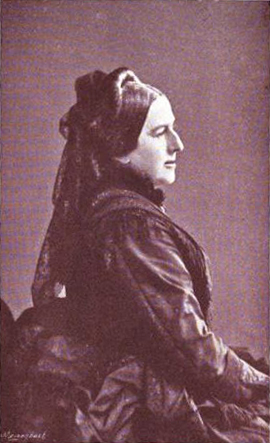
- Born: Rachel Salaman; 1 August 1823; London, England
- Died: 7 July 1899 (aged 75); London, England
- Spouse: Sir John Simon (m. 1843; died 1897)
- Writing career
- Language: English

Rachel, Lady Simon (née Salaman; 1 August 1823 – 7 July 1899) was an English Jewish author.

== Biography ==
Lady Rachel Simon was born in 1823, the fifth daughter of Alice (née Cowen) and Simeon Kensington Salaman. Her father was clothing supplier to the British Army and warden of the Western Synagogue, and she was the sister of Annette, Charles, and Julia, and Rose Emma Salaman. Lady Simon grew up amid the intellectual and refined surroundings of a home which was the rendezvous of many distinguished people.

On 12 July 1843, she married barrister John Simon, who would later serve as Serjeant-at-Law and Liberal Member of Parliament. A month after their marriage, the young couple left England for Jamaica, and on arrival there took up their residence in Spanish Town. Their daughter Zillah was born in 1844, the first of eight children, not long before the family immigrated to England when Rachel's health suffered in the tropical climate. They lived for a number of years in Wavertree, Liverpool and settled in London in 1856.

Lady Simon kept from her seventeenth year a diary, from which she published a selection covering a period of fifty years under the title Records and Reflections. The book, with which Lady Simon sought "to remove some of the prevailing misconceptions in regard to [her] ancestral religion," was released in 1894 to favourable reviews. She wrote also a work on the Psalms, entitled Beside the Still Waters (1899).

She died in London on 7 July 1899. Lady Simon was outlived by her five surviving children—two sons and three daughters. Her son Oswald John Simon (1855–1932) was a prominent communal worker and author, who served as member of the Council of the Anglo-Jewish Association from 1882 to 1911, and then as vice-president until his death.

== Bibliography ==
- Simon, Rachel (1894). Records and Reflections Selected from Her Writings During Half a Century (April 3rd, 1840, to April 3rd, 1890). London: Wertheimer, Lea & Co.
- Simon, Rachel (1899). Beside the Still Waters: Reflections on the Book of Psalms, Illustrated by Parallel verses from Other Portions of the Scriptures. London: Greenberg & Co.
