= Annette Salaman =

English writer

Annette A. Salaman
- Born: Annette Amelia Salaman; 1827
- Died: 10 April 1879 (aged 51–52); Brighton, United Kingdom
- Resting place: Balls Pond Road Cemetery

Annette Amelia "Annie" Salaman (1827 – 10 April 1879) was an English Jewish writer. She was the youngest daughter of Alice and Simeon Kensington Salaman, and sister of painter Julia Goodman, composer Charles Kensington Salaman, author Lady Rachel Simon, and poet Rose Emma Salaman.

In her childhood, during which she was for a time bedridden, Salaman compiled a collection of comforting scriptural texts, which were later published as an illustrated guide to the Bible entitled Footsteps on the Way of Life (1873). She was also the author of "How to Earn a Good Name" (1876) and "Aunt Annette's Stories to Ada" (1876), a series of tales for children.

== Selected bibliography ==
- Salaman, Annette A. (1873). Footsteps in the Way of Life. London: Trübner & Co.
- Salaman, Annette A. (1876). Aunt Annette's Stories to Ada. London: Griffith & Farran.
