= Charles Kensington Salaman =

British composer (1814–1901)

Charles Kensington Salaman Esq.
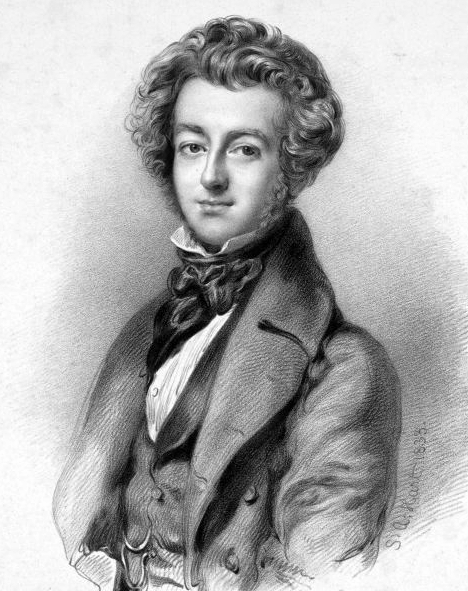
- Portrait of Charles K. Salaman by S. A. Hart (1833)
- Born: Charles Salaman; 3 March 1814; London, England
- Died: 23 June 1901 (aged 87); London, England
- Resting place: Golders Green Jewish Cemetery
- Occupations: Composer and pianist
- Era: Romantic
- Spouse: Frances Simon (m. 1848)
- Children: Malcolm Charles Salaman

Charles Kensington Salaman (3 March 1814 – 23 June 1901) was a British Jewish composer, pianist, and writer. He was the composer of more than one hundred settings of Hebrew texts for the West London Synagogue, as well as numerous songs in English, French, German, Italian, Spanish, Latin, and Greek.

== Biography ==
=== Early life ===
Charles Salaman was born in 1814 at 11 Charing Cross, London, the eldest son and one of the fourteen children of Alice (née Cowen) and Simeon Kensington Salaman. He was the brother of Rachel, Rose Emma, Annette, and Julia Salaman.

Salaman showed musical talent from a young age, and began to play the violin when seven, but after a year left it for the piano. He had his first lessons on the piano from his mother, and was soon placed under the tutelage of Stephen Francis Rimbault. He elected a candidate for admission to Royal Academy of Music at the age of ten, but his mother decided that he should remain at school to pursue general studies. He nonetheless studied independently under Charles Neate, William Crotch, and Henri Herz.

As a boy Salaman played duets with Franz Liszt and came to know Muzio Clementi. His first public appearance was at Gesualdo Lanza's concert at Blackheath in June 1828, when his song "Oh, come, dear Louisa" was sung. That year he also published the song "Trip It Gentle Mary" and an Original Theme with Variations for the Pianoforte, Op. 1.

In 1830 he was commissioned to set to music, in cantata form, an ode written by his uncle Isaac Cowen for the third Shakespeare Jubilee Celebration at Stratford-on-Avon. The work was performed at Stratford on 23 April 1830 with marked success, and it was subsequently given the same year at the King's Theatre under Salaman's own direction. Three years later, he gave his first annual orchestral concert at the Hanover Square Rooms. In 1836 at Bath, Salaman wrote his best-known work, a setting of Shelley's serenade "I arise from dreams of thee", published two years later in an album called Six Songs.

=== Career ===
Along with Henry Blagrove, Charles Lucas, and others, Salaman was a founding member of the Concerti da Camera chamber music organisation. He was elected a member of the Royal Society of Musicians, and an Associate of the Philharmonic Society, in 1837. The following year, he visited the Continent, making the acquaintance of Schumann, Czerny, Thalberg, and Mozart's widow and son.

From 1845 to 1848 Salaman resided in Rome, where he took an active part in the musical life of that city. During the Carnival of 1848 he conducted Beethoven's Symphony No. 2 at a concert at the Ruspoli Palace, this being the first time that an orchestra had played a Beethoven symphony in Rome. While in Italy, he composed several songs in Italian, and was present at the removal of the gates of the Roman Ghetto on Passover eve, 7 April 1847. He received the rare distinction of honorary membership in the Accademia Nazionale di Santa Cecilia and the Roman Philharmonic Society. On his return to England he played Beethoven's Pianoforte Concerto in C minor at the Philharmonic Society's concert of 18 March 1850.

From the 1850s Salaman pursued his scholarly interests in the history of music, becoming a regular contributor to The Musical Times and Singing Class Circular. In 1855 he began to deliver a series of lectures on the history of the piano and other musical subjects in London and the provinces, which were greatly appreciated, and he was specially invited, in conjunction with Michael Faraday and Sir Charles Wheatstone, to lecture in private at the Polytechnic Institution to Queen Victoria, Prince Albert, and their children, and to perform upon the ancient instruments. In 1858 Salaman founded the Musical Society of London, of which he held the post of honorary secretary for seven years, and later served as president of the Musical Association. In the former role he was instrumental in getting Sullivan's The Tempest performed for the first time in London in 1862.

=== Later life and death ===
Charles K. Salaman in 1901

Salaman gave his last concert in 1876 and soon retired from active work, but continued to teach and serve as choir master and organist at the West London Synagogue until 1890.

He was an early member of the Maccabaeans, a society for professional and cultured Jews to socialize and discuss matters of mutual concern. Salaman wrote the book Jews as They Are in 1882, with the intention of dispelling common myths about Judaism. It includes a defence of the Mendelssohn family's renouncement of Judaism and a critical essay on the character of Shylock from a Jewish point of view. In an article in The Musical World, he publicly denounced Richard Wagner for his anti-Semitic views.

Salaman died on 23 July 1901 at his residence, 24 Sutherland Avenue, Maida Vale. His last articulate words were "I arise from dreams of thee"—the title of his most famous song, of which he was reminded by hearing the name of Barton McGuckin, who often sang it, and who had just called to make inquiries.

== Compositions ==
A religious man, many of Salaman's compositions are musical settings of religious texts. His settings of "Ein Keloheinu" for the Shabbat morning service, and "Hari'u" for the wedding service, are still used in British synagogues, with many of his compositions and arrangements being included in The Voice Of Prayer And Praise. Salaman also adapted "He that Shall Endure to the End" from Mendelssohn's Elijah as a setting for Psalm 93 (Adonai Malakh), sung on most Friday nights in the Sabbath eve service of the London Spanish and Portuguese Jewish community. He composed and arranged in 1858 the choral and organ music for the psalms and service of the synagogue of the Reformed Congregation of British Jews.

In his later years he made an annual custom of publishing a song on his birthday. He produced more than 200 songs, to texts by Horace, Catullus, Metastasio, Byron, and others. He composed a funeral march in memory of Victor Hugo, which was performed at the Albert Hall, and released a comic opera, Pickwick, in 1889.

== Legacy ==
Among portraits of Salaman are a three-quarter length (oils) by his sister, Julia Goodman, 1834; a sketch, seated at piano (oils), by Sydney Starr, 1890; a marble medallion in high relief, by Giuseppe Girometti, Rome, 1847; and a lithograph, by Richard James Lane, after a drawing by Solomon Hart, published in 1834.
