= Bernard Lens III =

English painter

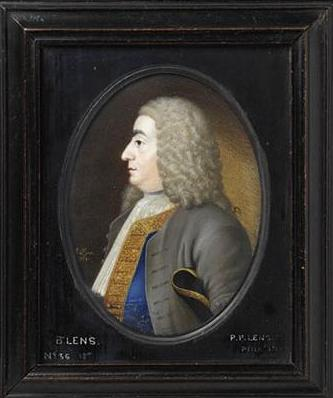
A portrait of Bernard Lens III by his son Peter Paul Lens. Around 1734.

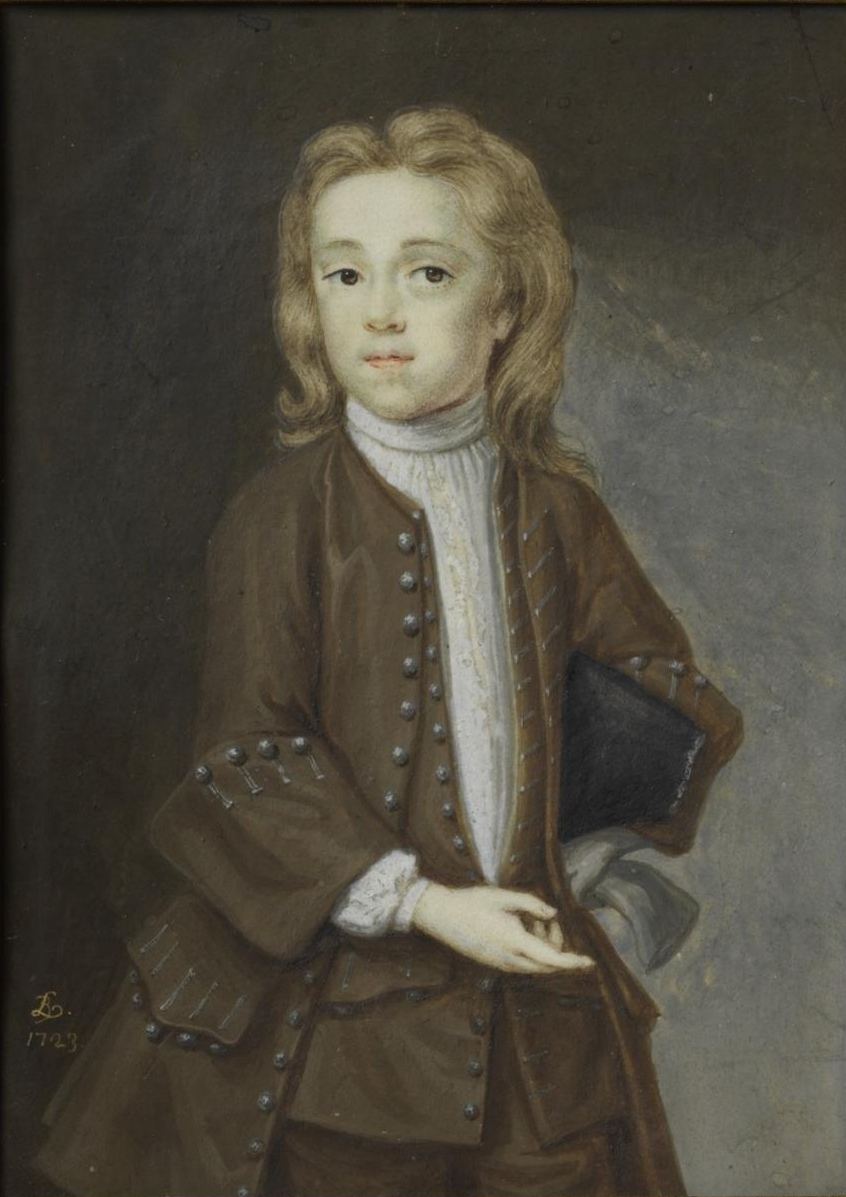
1723 portrait of the artist's son, Andrew Benjamin Lens, by Bernard Lens III (Victoria and Albert Museum, P.40-1922).

Bernard Lens III (27 May 1682 – 24 December 1740) was an English artist known primarily for his portrait miniatures. Lens was the miniature painter at the courts of kings George I and George II, instructor in miniature painting (then called limning) to prince William and princesses Mary and Louise and consultant in fine arts to upper-class families.

== Biography ==
Lens, the son of mezzotint engraver Bernard Lens II, was born in London in 1682 and in 1698 became an apprentice to an artist known as Sturt, quite likely his father's partner John Sturt (1658–1730). Sturt was a member of the Company of Goldsmiths, but the membership was merely a license to work within the City of London, not an indicator of his actual trade.

In 1704 Lens joined the newly established Rose and Crown Club, an art society frequented by William Hogarth and George Vertue. Lens established himself as a portrait miniaturist, and in 1707 became the first British artist to replace vellum, the traditional medium of miniatures, with ivory. The difficult skill of painting watercolours on ivory was invented in Venice by Rosalba Carriera around 1700 and quickly spread over Europe. The style of Lens was close to that of Carriera, although Lens conservatively employed pencil sketches and heavier paints that reduced translucency of glazes over the ivory substrate. Dudley Heath and Marjorie Wieseman noted the contrast between the translucent, lightweight appearance of skin tones with solid, oil–like draperies and backgrounds. In line with the fashion of his period Lens, according to Heath, "seems to be partial to a very crude light blue in the costumes", inferior to the blues of older masters.

Bernard Lens III and his wife Katherine (née Woods) had at least three sons, among them Bernard Lens IV. All— though according to Horace Walpole's Catalogue of Engravers only two of the three— became prolific draftsmen (Walpole: "ingenious painters in miniature") but did not leave a significant legacy; attribution of their artwork is problematic. One of these sons, miniaturist Peter Paul Lens (1714–1750), has painted the portrait of his father that is conserved in the Victoria and Albert Museum. Another son, Andrew Benjamin Lens, born around 1713, also was a miniaturist.

His main competitor was Christian Friedrich Zincke, who worked in enamel. Horace Walpole called Bernard Lens III "the incomparable painter in watercolours" and lamented that his copies of great masters "had all the merits of the originals except what they deserved too: duration." Dudley Heath, on the contrary, called Lens "hard and unappealing", inferior to Laurence Crosse.

The "Entire and Elaborate Works of Mr. Bernard Lens" were auctioned by Christopher Cock on 11–12 February 1737.

== Sources ==
- Dudley Heath (2008). Miniatures (reprint ed.). Read Books. ISBN 978-1443770033.
- Horace Walpole, 4th Earl of Orford (1782). A catalogue of engravers: who have been born, or resided in England. Printed for J. Dodsley.
- Marjorie E. Wieseman (2006). Perfect likeness: European and American portrait miniatures from the Cincinnati Art Museum. Yale University Press. ISBN 0300115806.
