= Julia Goodman =

English painter

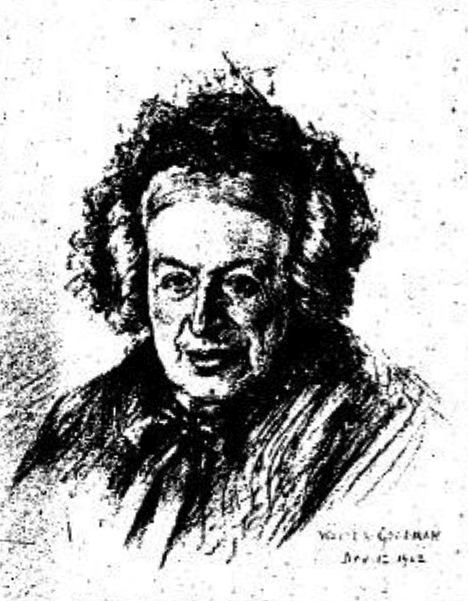
- Born: Julia Salaman; 12 November 1812
- Died: 31 December 1906 (aged 94)
- Resting place: Golders Green Jewish Cemetery
- Education: Sass's Academy
- Spouse: Louis Goodman (m. 1836–1876)

Julia Goodman (née Salaman; 12 November 1812 – 31 December 1906) was a British portrait painter.

== Biography ==
The daughter of Simeon Kensington Salaman (b. 1789) and Alice Cowan, she was one of fourteen siblings and first studied painting under Robert Faulkner, himself a pupil of Sir Joshua Reynolds. In 1836 she married London linen draper, Louis Goodman (1811–1876). Her sister, Kate was an accomplished miniature painter.

Julia Goodman was a student at Sass's Academy in Bloomsbury and began her career by copying old masters and her works were much in demand. In 1835 she began exhibiting her original portraits at the Royal Academy and The Society of British Artists.

Julia Goodman had seven children Edward (1836), Walter (1838), Constance (1841), Arthur (1842), Robert (1845), Alice (1848), and Miriam (1850). Miriam was a well-known pianist of her day and graduated from the Royal Academy of Music. Edward, a playwright and author of many novels and travel books, was on the editorial staff of The Daily Telegraph for almost forty years and was the chairman of the Savage Club committee. Walter was the acclaimed painter, illustrator and author.

Julia Goodman died on New Year's Eve 1906 and is buried at Golders Green Jewish Cemetery in London.

== Work ==
One of Goodman's earliest original works was a portrait of Mr. Gilbert Abbott à Beckett. Other sitters included the Earl of Westmorland (who founded the Royal Academy of Music), Sir George A. MacFarren, Sir John Erichsen, Lady Martins, David Woolf Marks, Vere Lady Isham, the Hon. Mrs. Le Poer Tench, Countess Waldegrave, Sir Henry Taylor, Joaquin Cuadras (shown at the Exhibition of the Society of Female Artists in London in 1864), Colonel Thorpe of Guernsey, Colonel Thurburn, Charles Bertram, Miss Fanny Corbaux, Miss Beattie Kingston, Miss Kate Rorke, Dr. Van Oven, Dr. Francis Goldsmid, Henry Lemon, Rev. Dr. Lowy, Rev. Professor Marks, various members of the Mocatta family, Sir John Simon, and Charles Kensington Salaman. Other notable works that are documented are Abraham Soloman Esq. (Liverpool Society of Fine Arts, 1859), Sir F. L. Goldsmid, Bart. (Liverpool Society of Fine Arts, 1861), The Belle of the Ball (Liverpool Society of Fine Arts, 1862), T. Solamon Esq. (Liverpool Institute of Fine Arts, 1863), and Flora (Liverpool Institute of Fine Arts, 1865).

The paintings Goodman exhibited at The Royal Academy are G. A. Beckett Esq. (1838), Miss Rosa Goodman (1841), Miss Minna Goodman (1842), Miss Fanny Corbaux (1844), B. Van Oven Esq. M.P.(1857), The Earl of Westmorland (1858), and Alice (1863). The portraits of George MacFarren and The Earl of Westmorland are in the collection of the Royal Academy of Music.

Julia Goodman exhibited two paintings at The British Institution - A Young Cottager, in 1837, and Don Juan, in 1848.

She is also known to have painted many other portraits of her family. Her final portrait was that of the Rev. Isidore Harris, which she painted at the age of 90. Julia Goodman herself estimated that she had painted more than one thousand portraits.
