= Drug prohibition =

Prohibition of drugs through law

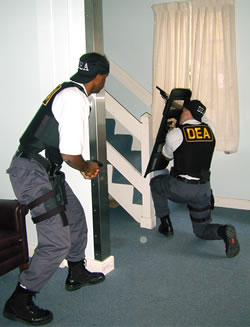
U.S. Drug Enforcement Administration agents in a training exercise

The prohibition of drugs through sumptuary legislation or religious law is a common means of attempting to prevent the recreational use of certain intoxicating substances.

An area has a prohibition of drugs when its government uses the force of law to punish the use or possession of drugs which have been classified as controlled. A government may simultaneously have systems in place to regulate both controlled and non controlled drugs. Regulation controls the manufacture, distribution, marketing, sale, and use of certain drugs, for instance through a prescription system. For example, in some states, the possession or sale of amphetamines is a crime unless a patient has a physician's prescription for the drug; having a prescription authorizes a pharmacy to sell and a patient to use a drug that would otherwise be prohibited. Although prohibition mostly concerns psychoactive drugs (which affect mental processes such as perception, cognition, and mood), prohibition can also apply to non-psychoactive drugs, such as anabolic steroids. Many governments do not criminalize the possession of a limited quantity of certain drugs for personal use, while still prohibiting their sale or manufacture, or possession in large quantities. Some laws (or judicial practice) set a specific volume of a particular drug, above which is considered ipso jure to be evidence of trafficking or sale of the drug.

Some Islamic countries prohibit the use of alcohol (see list of countries with alcohol prohibition). Many governments levy a tax on alcohol and tobacco products, and restrict alcohol and tobacco from being sold or gifted to a minor. Other common restrictions include bans on outdoor drinking and indoor smoking. In the early 20th century, many countries had alcohol prohibition. These include the United States (1920–1933), Finland (1919–1932), Norway (1916–1927), Canada (1901–1948), Iceland (1915–1922) and the Russian Empire/USSR (1914–1925). In fact, the first international treaty to control a psychoactive substance adopted in 1890 actually concerned alcoholic beverages (Brussels Conference). The first treaty on opium only arrived two decades later, in 1912.

== Definitions ==
Drugs, in the context of prohibition, are any of a number of psychoactive substances whose use a government or religious body seeks to control. What constitutes a drug varies by century and belief system. What is a psychoactive substance is relatively well known to modern science. Examples include a range from caffeine found in coffee, tea, and chocolate, nicotine in tobacco products; botanical extracts morphine and heroin, and synthetic compounds MDMA and fentanyl. Almost without exception, these substances also have a medical use, in which case they are called pharmaceutical drugs or just pharmaceuticals. The use of medicine to save or extend life or to alleviate suffering is uncontroversial in most cultures. Prohibition applies to certain conditions of possession or use. Recreational use refers to the use of substances primarily for their psychoactive effect outside of a clinical situation or doctor's care.

In the twenty-first century, caffeine has pharmaceutical uses. Caffeine is used to treat bronchopulmonary dysplasia. In most cultures, caffeine in the form of coffee or tea is unregulated. Over 2.25 billion cups of coffee are consumed in the world every day. Some religions, including the Church of Jesus Christ of Latter-day Saints, prohibit coffee. They believe that it is both physically and spiritually unhealthy to consume coffee.

A government's interest to control a drug may be based on its negative effects on its users, or it may simply have a revenue interest. The British parliament prohibited the possession of untaxed tea with the imposition of the Tea Act of 1773. In this case, as in many others, it is not a substance that is prohibited, but the conditions under which it is possessed or consumed. Those conditions include matters of intent, which makes the enforcement of laws difficult. In Colorado possession of "blenders, bowls, containers, spoons, and mixing devices" is illegal if there was intent to use them with drugs.

Many drugs, beyond their pharmaceutical and recreational uses, have industrial uses. Nitrous oxide, or laughing gas is a dental anesthetic, also used to prepare whipped cream, fuel rocket engines, and enhance the performance of race cars. Ethanol, or drinking alcohol, is also used as a fuel, industrial solvent and disinfectant.

== History ==
The cultivation, use, and trade of psychoactive and other drugs has occurred since ancient times. Concurrently, authorities have often restricted drug possession and trade for a variety of political and religious reasons. In the 20th century, the United States led a major renewed surge in drug prohibition called the "war on drugs".

=== Early drug laws ===
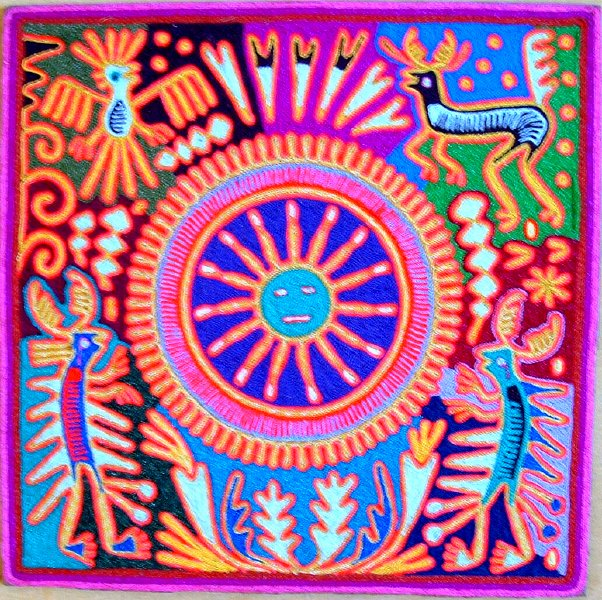
Huichol religion worshiped the god of Peyote, a drug.

The prohibition on alcohol under Islamic Sharia law, which is usually attributed to passages in the Qur'an, dates back to the early seventh century. Although Islamic law is often interpreted as prohibiting all intoxicants (not only alcohol), the ancient practice of hashish smoking has continued throughout the history of Islam, against varying degrees of resistance. A major campaign against hashish-eating Sufis were conducted in Egypt in the 11th and 12th centuries resulting among other things in the burning of fields of cannabis.

Though the prohibition of illegal drugs was established under Sharia law, particularly against the use of hashish as a recreational drug, classical jurists of medieval Islamic jurisprudence accepted the use of hashish for medicinal and therapeutic purposes, and agreed that its "medical use, even if it leads to mental derangement, should remain exempt [from punishment]". In the 14th century, the Islamic scholar Az-Zarkashi spoke of "the permissibility of its use for medical purposes if it is established that it is beneficial".

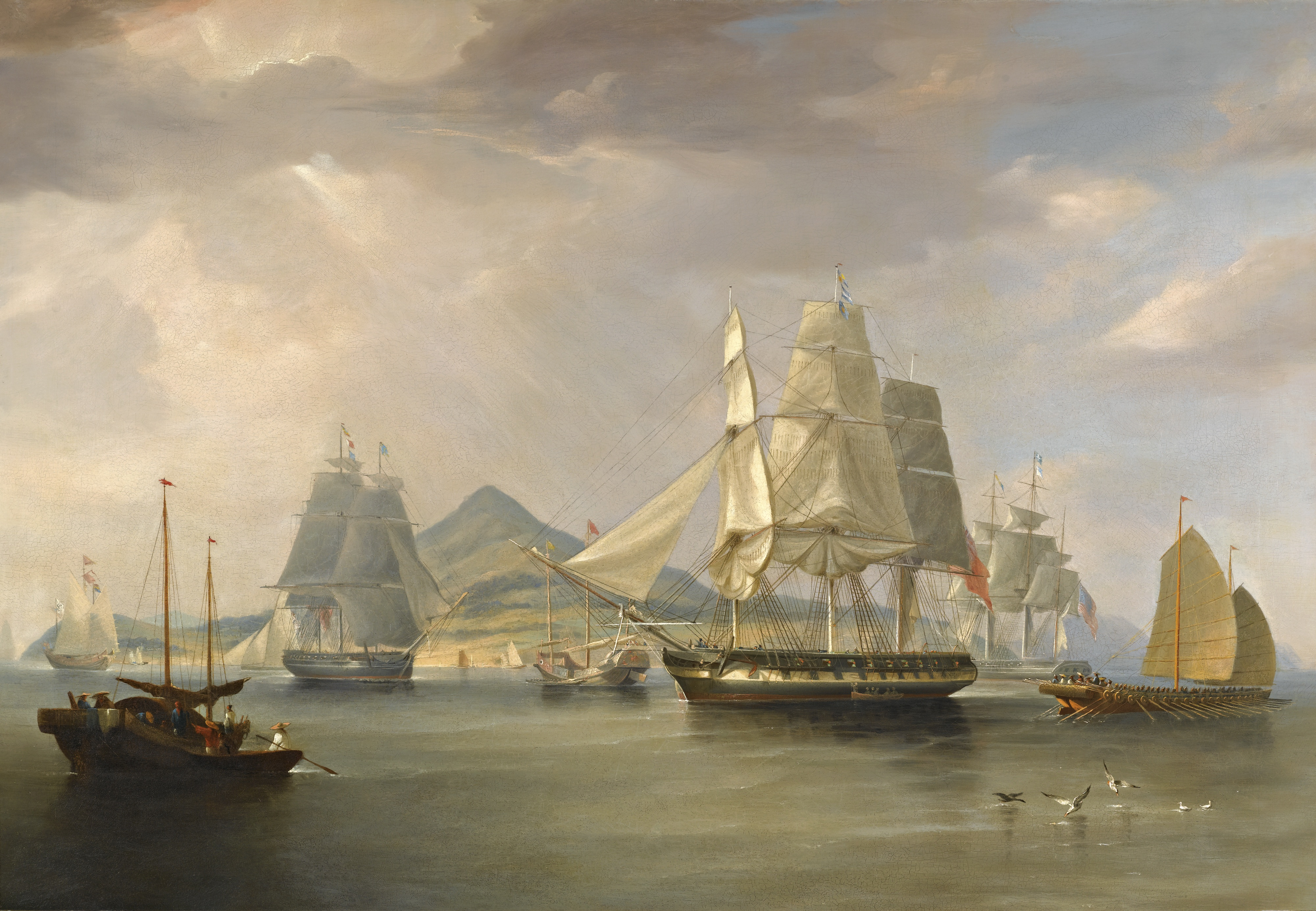
A painting of opium ships sailing into China. Chinese attempts to suppress opium smuggling sparked the First Opium War.

In the Ottoman Empire, Murad IV attempted to prohibit coffee drinking to Muslims as haraam, arguing that it was an intoxicant, but this ruling was overturned soon after he died in 1640. The introduction of coffee in Europe from Muslim Turkey prompted calls for it to be banned as the devil's work, although Pope Clement VIII sanctioned its use in 1600, declaring that it was "so delicious that it would be a pity to let the infidels have exclusive use of it". Bach's Coffee Cantata, from the 1730s, presents a vigorous debate between a girl and her father over her desire to consume coffee. The early association between coffeehouses and seditious political activities in England led to the banning of such establishments in the mid-17th century.

A number of Asian rulers had similarly enacted early prohibitions, many of which were later forcefully overturned by Western colonial powers during the 18th and 19th centuries. In 1360, for example, King Ramathibodi I, of Ayutthaya Kingdom (now Thailand), prohibited opium consumption and trade. The prohibition lasted nearly 500 years until 1851 when King Rama IV allowed Chinese migrants to consume opium. The Konbaung Dynasty prohibited all intoxicants and stimulants during the reign of King Bodawpaya (1781–1819). After Burma became a British colony, the restrictions on opium were abolished and the colonial government established monopolies selling Indian-produced opium.

In late Qing China, opium imported by foreign traders, such as those employed by Jardine Matheson and the East India Company, was consumed by all social classes in Southern China. Between 1821 and 1837, imports of the drug increased fivefold. The wealth drain and widespread social problems that resulted from this consumption prompted the Chinese government to attempt to end the trade. This effort was initially successful, with Lin Zexu ordering the destruction of opium at Humen in June 1839. However, the opium traders lobbied the British government to declare war on China, resulting in the First Opium War. The Qing government was defeated and the war ended with the Treaty of Nanking, which legalized opium trading in Chinese law

=== First modern drug regulations ===
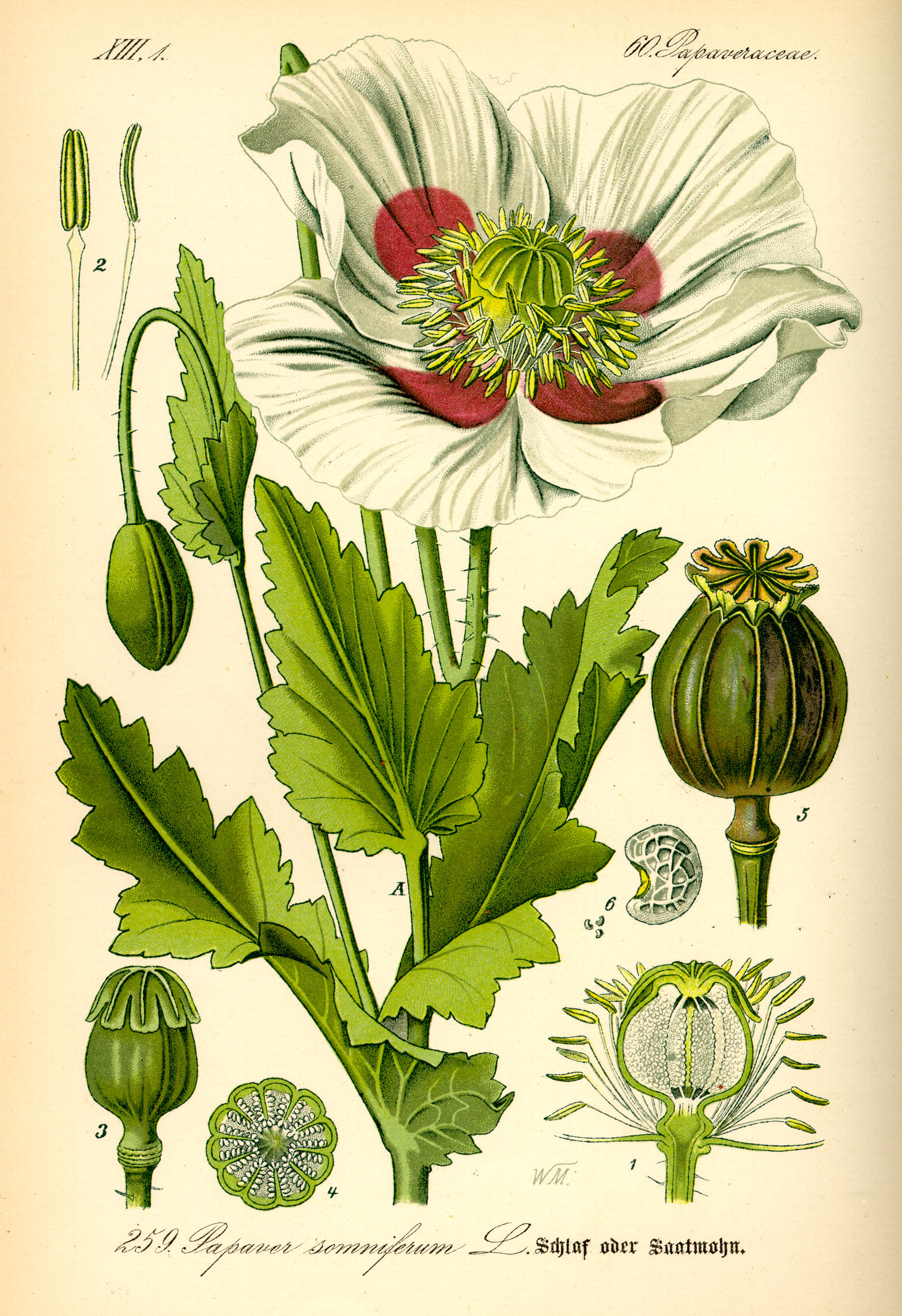
Papaver somniferum. The sale of drugs in the UK was regulated by the Pharmacy Act 1868.

The first modern law in Europe for the regulating of drugs was the Pharmacy Act 1868 in the United Kingdom. There had been previous moves to establish the medical and pharmaceutical professions as separate, self-regulating bodies, but the General Medical Council, established in 1863, unsuccessfully attempted to assert control over drug distribution. The act set controls on the distribution of poisons and drugs. Poisons could only be sold if the purchaser was known to the seller or to an intermediary known to both, and drugs, including opium and all preparations of opium or of poppies, had to be sold in containers with the seller's name and address. Despite the reservation of opium to professional control, general sales did continue to a limited extent, with mixtures with less than 1 percent opium being unregulated.

After the legislation passed, the death rate caused by opium immediately fell from 6.4 per million population in 1868 to 4.5 in 1869. Deaths among children under five dropped from 20.5 per million population between 1863 and 1867 to 12.7 per million in 1871 and further declined to between 6 and 7 per million in the 1880s.

In the United States, the first drug law was passed in San Francisco in 1875, banning the smoking of opium in opium dens. The reason cited was "many women and young girls, as well as young men of a respectable family, were being induced to visit the Chinese opium-smoking dens, where they were ruined morally and otherwise." This was followed by other laws throughout the country, and federal laws that barred Chinese people from trafficking in opium. Though the laws affected the use and distribution of opium by Chinese immigrants, no action was taken against the producers of such products as laudanum, a tincture of opium and alcohol, commonly taken as a panacea by white Americans. The distinction between its use by white Americans and Chinese immigrants was thus a form of racial discrimination as it was based on the form in which it was ingested: Chinese immigrants tended to smoke it, while it was often included in various kinds of generally liquid medicines often (but not exclusively) used by Americans of European descent. The laws targeted opium smoking, but not other methods of ingestion.

Britain passed the All-India Opium Act of 1878, which limited recreational opium sales to registered Indian opium-eaters and Chinese opium-smokers and prohibiting its sale to emigrant workers from British Burma.

Following the passage of a regional law in 1895, Australia's Aboriginals Protection and Restriction of the Sale of Opium Act 1897 addressed opium addiction among Aborigines, though it soon became a general vehicle for depriving them of basic rights by administrative regulation. Opium sale was prohibited to the general population in 1905, and smoking and possession were prohibited in 1908.

Despite these laws, the late 19th century saw an increase in opiate consumption. This was due to the prescribing and dispensing of legal opiates by physicians and pharmacists to relieve menstruation pain. It is estimated that between 150,000 and 200,000 opiate addicts lived in the United States at the time, and a majority of these addicts were women.

=== Changing attitudes and the drug prohibition campaign ===
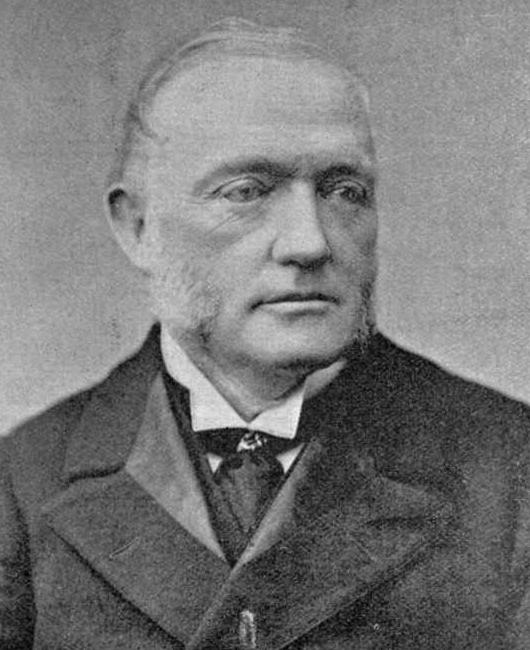
Thomas Brassey was appointed the head of the Royal Opium Commission in 1893 to investigate the opium trade and make recommendations on its legality.

Foreign traders, including those employed by Jardine Matheson and the East India Company, smuggled opium into China in order to balance high trade deficits. Chinese attempts to outlaw the trade led to the First Opium War and the subsequent legalization of the trade at the Treaty of Nanking. Attitudes towards the opium trade were initially ambivalent, but in 1874 the Society for the Suppression of the Opium Trade was formed in England by Quakers led by the Rev. Frederick Storrs-Turner. By the 1890s, increasingly strident campaigns were waged by Protestant missionaries in China for its abolition. The first such society was established at the 1890 Shanghai Missionary Conference, where British and American representatives, including John Glasgow Kerr, Arthur E. Moule, Arthur Gostick Shorrock and Griffith John, agreed to establish the Permanent Committee for the Promotion of Anti-Opium Societies.

Due to increasing pressure in the British parliament, the Liberal government under William Ewart Gladstone approved the appointment of a Royal Commission on Opium to India in 1893. The commission was tasked with ascertaining the impact of Indian opium exports to the Far East, and to advise whether the trade should be banned and opium consumption itself banned in India. After an extended inquiry, the Royal Commission rejected the claims made by the anti-opium campaigners regarding the supposed societal harm caused by the trade and the issue was finalized for another 15 years.

The missionary organizations were outraged over the Royal Commission on Opium's conclusions and set up the Anti-Opium League in China; the league gathered data from every Western-trained medical doctor in China and published Opinions of Over 100 Physicians on the Use of Opium in China. This was the first anti-drug campaign to be based on scientific principles, and it had a tremendous impact on the state of educated opinion in the West. In England, the home director of the China Inland Mission, Benjamin Broomhall, was an active opponent of the opium trade, writing two books to promote the banning of opium smoking: The Truth about Opium Smoking and The Chinese Opium Smoker. In 1888, Broomhall formed and became secretary of the Christian Union for the Severance of the British Empire with the Opium Traffic and editor of its periodical, National Righteousness. He lobbied the British parliament to ban the opium trade. Broomhall and James Laidlaw Maxwell appealed to the London Missionary Conference of 1888 and the Edinburgh Missionary Conference of 1910 to condemn the continuation of the trade. As Broomhall lay dying, an article from The Times was read to him with the welcome news that an international agreement had been signed ensuring the end of the opium trade within two years.

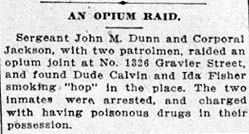
Newspaper article from The Daily Picayune, New Orleans, Louisiana in 1912 reporting on a drug arrest, a month after the International Opium Convention was signed and ratified at The Hague

In 1906, a motion to 'declare the opium trade "morally indefensible" and remove Government support for it', initially unsuccessfully proposed by Arthur Pease in 1891, was put before the House of Commons. This time the motion passed. The Qing government banned opium soon afterward.

These changing attitudes led to the founding of the International Opium Commission in 1909. The First International Opium Convention was signed by 13 nations at The Hague on January 23, 1912, during the First International Opium Conference. This was the first international drug control treaty and it was registered in the League of Nations Treaty Series on January 23, 1922. The Convention provided that "The contracting Powers shall use their best endeavors to control or to cause to be controlled, all person manufacturing, importing, selling, distributing, and exporting morphine, cocaine, and their respective salts, as well as the buildings in which these persons carry such an industry or trade."

The treaty became international law in 1919 when it was incorporated into the Treaty of Versailles. The role of the commission was passed to the League of Nations, and all signatory nations agreed to prohibit the import, sale, distribution, export, and use of all narcotic drugs, except for medical and scientific purposes.

=== Prohibition ===
In the UK the Defence of the Realm Act 1914, passed at the onset of the First World War, gave the government wide-ranging powers to requisition the property and to criminalize specific activities. A moral panic was whipped up by the press in 1916 over the alleged sale of drugs to the troops of the British Indian Army. With the temporary powers of DORA, the Army Council quickly banned the sale of all psychoactive drugs to troops, unless required for medical reasons. However, shifts in the public attitude towards drugs—they were beginning to be associated with prostitution, vice and immorality—led the government to pass further unprecedented laws, banning and criminalising the possession and dispensation of all narcotics, including opium and cocaine. After the war, this legislation was maintained and strengthened with the passing of the Dangerous Drugs Act 1920 (10 & 11 Geo. 5. c. 46). Home Office control was extended to include raw opium, morphine, cocaine, ecogonine and heroin.

Hardening of Canadian attitudes toward Chinese-Canadian opium users and fear of a spread of the drug into the white population led to the effective criminalization of opium for nonmedical use in Canada between 1908 and the mid-1920s.

The Mao Zedong government nearly eradicated both consumption and production of opium during the 1950s using social control and isolation. Ten million addicts were forced into compulsory treatment, dealers were executed, and opium-producing regions were planted with new crops. Remaining opium production shifted south of the Chinese border into the Golden Triangle region. The remnant opium trade primarily served Southeast Asia, but spread to American soldiers during the Vietnam War, with 20 percent of soldiers regarding themselves as addicted during the peak of the epidemic in 1971. In 2003, China was estimated to have four million regular drug users and one million registered drug addicts.

In the US, the Harrison Act was passed in 1914, and required sellers of opiates and cocaine to get a license. While originally intended to regulate the trade, it soon became a prohibitive law, eventually becoming legal precedent that any prescription for a narcotic given by a physician or pharmacist – even in the course of medical treatment for addiction – constituted conspiracy to violate the Harrison Act. In 1919, the Supreme Court ruled in Doremus that the Harrison Act was constitutional and in Webb that physicians could not prescribe narcotics solely for maintenance. In Jin Fuey Moy v. United States, the court upheld that it was a violation of the Harrison Act even if a physician provided prescription of a narcotic for an addict, and thus subject to criminal prosecution. This is also true of the later Marijuana Tax Act in 1937. Soon, however, licensing bodies did not issue licenses, effectively banning the drugs.

The American judicial system did not initially accept drug prohibition. Prosecutors argued that possessing drugs was a tax violation, as no legal licenses to sell drugs were in existence; hence, a person possessing drugs must have purchased them from an unlicensed source. After some wrangling, this was accepted as federal jurisdiction under the interstate commerce clause of the U.S. Constitution.

==== Alcohol prohibition ====
The prohibition of alcohol commenced in Finland in 1919 and in the United States in 1920. Because alcohol was the most popular recreational drug in these countries, reactions to its prohibition were far more negative than to the prohibition of other drugs, which were commonly associated with ethnic minorities, prostitution, and vice. Public pressure led to the repeal of alcohol prohibition in Finland in 1932, and in the United States in 1933. Residents of many provinces of Canada also experienced alcohol prohibition for similar periods in the first half of the 20th century.

In Sweden, a referendum in 1922 decided against an alcohol prohibition law (with 51% of the votes against and 49% for prohibition), but starting in 1914 (nationwide from 1917) and until 1955 Sweden employed an alcohol rationing system with personal liquor ration books ("motbok").

=== War on drugs ===
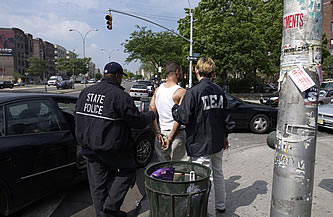
American drug law enforcement agents detain a man in 2005.

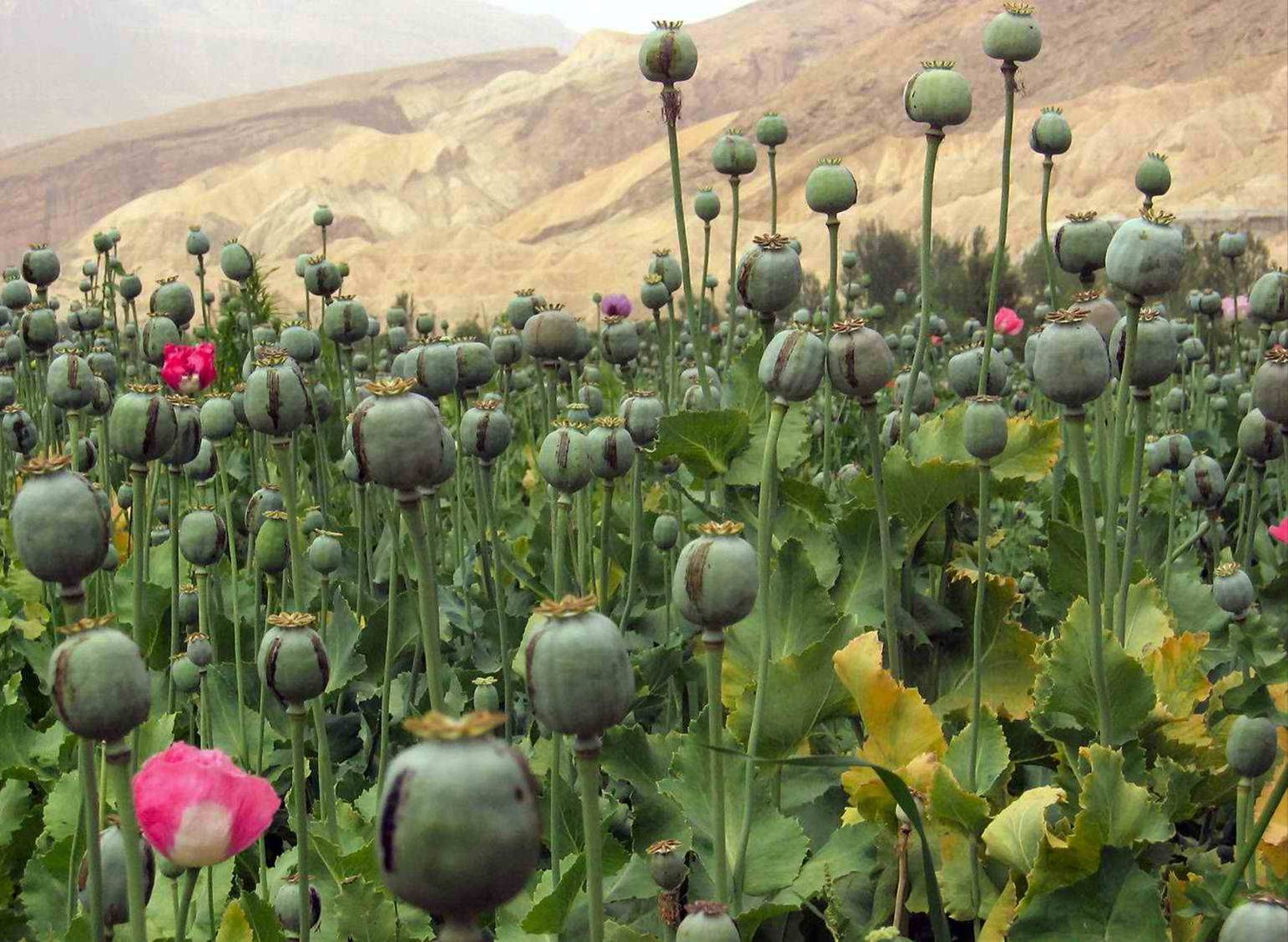
Opium poppies growing in Afghanistan, a major source of drugs today

In response to rising drug use among young people and the counterculture movement, government efforts to enforce prohibition were strengthened in many countries from the 1960s onward. Support at an international level for the prohibition of psychoactive drug use became a consistent feature of United States policy during both Republican and Democratic administrations, to such an extent that US support for foreign governments has often been contingent on their adherence to US drug policy. Major milestones in this campaign include the introduction of the Single Convention on Narcotic Drugs in 1961, the Convention on Psychotropic Substances in 1971 and the United Nations Convention Against Illicit Traffic in Narcotic Drugs and Psychotropic Substances in 1988. A few developing countries where consumption of the prohibited substances has enjoyed longstanding cultural support, long resisted such outside pressure to pass legislation adhering to these conventions. Nepal only did so in 1976.

In 1972, United States President Richard Nixon announced the commencement of the so-called "war on drugs". Later, President Reagan added the position of drug czar to the President's Executive Office. In 1973, New York introduced mandatory minimum sentences of 15 years to life imprisonment for possession of more than 113 grams (4 oz) of a so-called hard drug, called the Rockefeller drug laws after New York Governor and later Vice President Nelson Rockefeller. Similar laws were introduced across the United States.

California's broader 'three strikes and you're out' policy adopted in 1994 was the first mandatory sentencing policy to gain widespread publicity and was subsequently adopted in most United States jurisdictions. This policy mandates life imprisonment for a third criminal conviction of any felony offense. A similar 'three strikes' policy was introduced to the United Kingdom by the Conservative government in 1997. This legislation enacted a mandatory minimum sentence of seven years for those convicted for a third time of a drug trafficking offense involving a class A drug.

=== Calls for legalization, relegalization or decriminalization ===
The terms relegalization, legalization, legal regulations, or decriminalization are used with very different meanings by different authors, something that can be confusing when the claims are not specified. Here are some variants:

- Sales of one or more drugs (e.g., marijuana) for personal use become legal, at least if sold in a certain way.
- Sales of an extracts with a specific substance become legal sold in a certain way, for example on prescription.
- Use or possession of small amounts for personal use do not lead to incarceration if it is the only crime, but it is still illegal; the court or the prosecutor can impose a fine. (In that sense, Sweden both legalized and supported drug prohibition simultaneously.)
- Use or possession of small amounts for personal use do not lead to incarceration. The case is not treated in an ordinary court, but by a commission that may recommend treatment or sanctions including fines. (In that sense, Portugal both legalized and supported drug prohibitions).

There are efforts around the world to promote the relegalization and decriminalization of drugs. These policies are often supported by proponents of liberalism and libertarianism on the grounds of individual freedom, as well as by leftists who believe prohibition to be a method of suppression of the working class by the ruling class.

Prohibition of drugs is supported by proponents of conservatism as well various NGOs. A number of NGOs are aligned in support of drug prohibition as members of the World Federation Against Drugs. In the WFAD constitution, the "Declaration of the World Forum Against Drugs" (2008) advocates for "no other goal than a drug-free world", and states that a balanced policy of drug abuse prevention, education, treatment, law enforcement, research, and supply reduction provides the most effective platform to reduce drug abuse and its associated harms and calls on governments to consider demand reduction as one of their first priorities. It supports the UN drug conventions, the inclusion of cannabis as one of the "hard drugs", and the use of criminal sanctions "when appropriate" to deter drug use. It opposes legalization in any form, and harm reduction in general.

According to some critics, drug prohibition is responsible for enriching "organised criminal networks" while the hypothesis that the prohibition of drugs generates violence is consistent with research done over long time-series and cross-country facts.

In the United Kingdom, where the principal piece of drug prohibition legislation is the Misuse of Drugs Act 1971, criticism includes:

- Drug classification: making a hash of it?, Fifth Report of Session 2005–06, House of Commons Science and Technology Committee, which said that the present system of drug classification is based on historical assumptions, not scientific assessment
- Development of a rational scale to assess the harm of drugs of potential misuse, David Nutt, Leslie A. King, William Saulsbury, Colin Blakemore, The Lancet, 24 March 2007, said the act is "not fit for purpose" and "the exclusion of alcohol and tobacco from the Misuse of Drugs Act is, from a scientific perspective, arbitrary"
- The Drug Equality Alliance (DEA) argue that the Government is administering the Act arbitrarily, contrary to its purpose, contrary to the original wishes of Parliament and therefore illegally. They are currently assisting and supporting several legal challenges to this alleged maladministration.

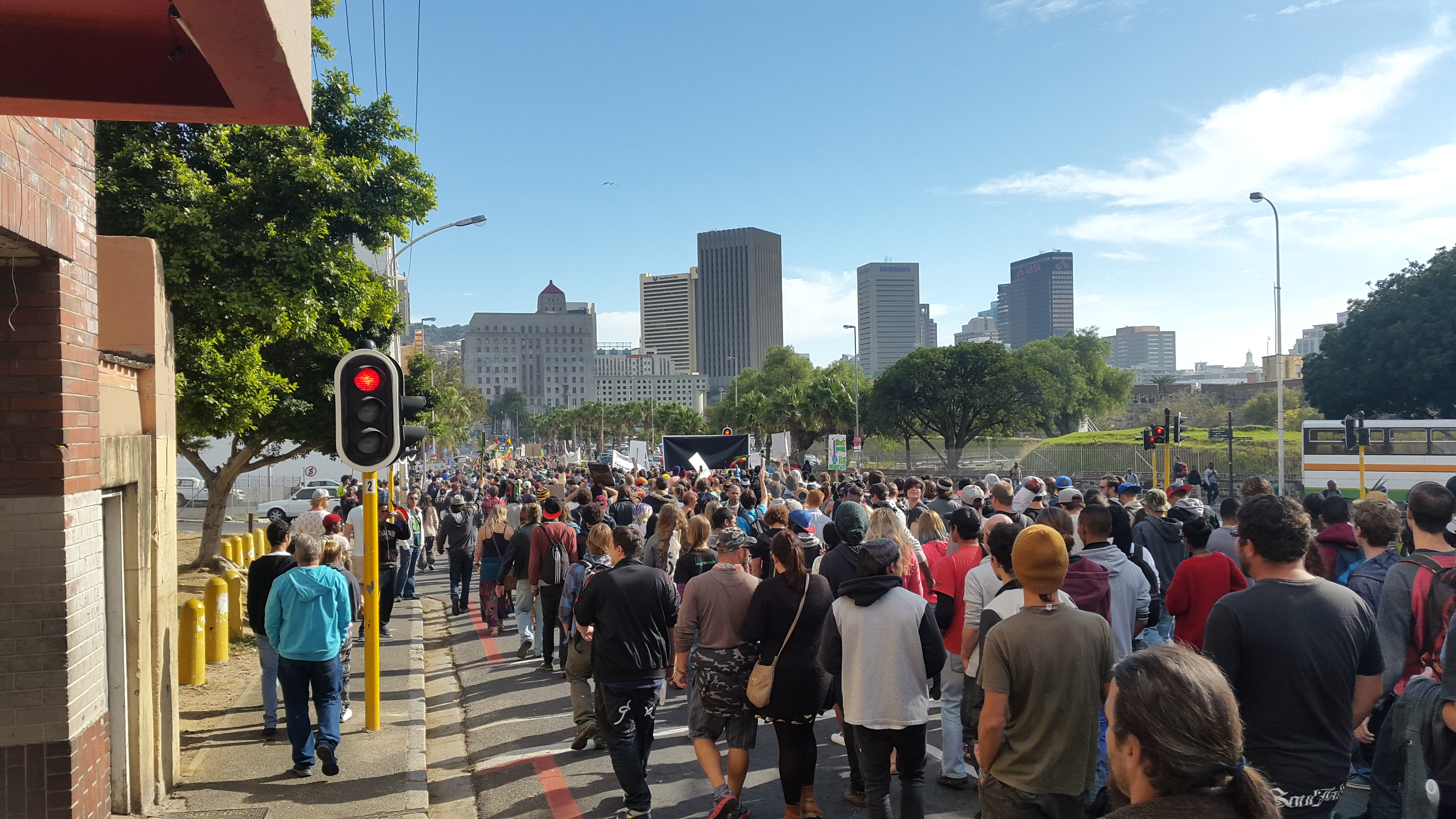
People marching in the streets of Cape Town against the prohibition of cannabis in South Africa, May 2015

In February 2008 the then-president of Honduras, Manuel Zelaya, called on the world to legalize drugs, in order, he said, to prevent the majority of violent murders occurring in Honduras. Honduras is used by cocaine smugglers as a transiting point between Colombia and the US. Honduras, with a population of 7 million, suffers an average of 8–10 murders a day, with an estimated 70% being a result of this international drug trade. The same problem is occurring in Guatemala, El Salvador, Costa Rica and Mexico, according to Zelaya. In January 2012 Colombian President Juan Manuel Santos made a plea to the United States and Europe to start a global debate about legalizing drugs. This call was echoed by the Guatemalan President Otto Pérez Molina, who announced his desire to legalize drugs, saying "What I have done is put the issue back on the table."

In a report dealing with HIV in June 2014, the World Health Organization (WHO) of the UN called for the decriminalization of drugs particularly including injected ones. This conclusion put WHO at odds with broader long-standing UN policy favoring criminalization. Eight states of the United States (Alaska, California, Colorado, Maine, Massachusetts, Nevada, Oregon, and Washington), as well as the District of Columbia, have legalized the sale of marijuana for personal recreational use as of 2017, although recreational use remains illegal under U.S. federal law. The conflict between state and federal law is, as of 2018, unresolved.

Since Uruguay in 2014 and Canada in 2018 legalized cannabis, the debate has known a new turn internationally.

On March 14, 2025, the United Nations Commission on Narcotic Drugs decided to create a panel of independent experts to rethink the global drug control regime.

== Drug prohibition laws ==
The following individual drugs, listed under their respective family groups (e.g., barbiturates, benzodiazepines, opiates), are the most frequently sought after by drug users and as such are prohibited or otherwise heavily regulated for use in many countries:

- Among the barbiturates, pentobarbital (Nembutal), secobarbital (Seconal), and amobarbital (Amytal)
- Among the benzodiazepines, temazepam (Restoril; Normison; Euhypnos), flunitrazepam (Rohypnol; Hypnor; Flunipam), and alprazolam (Xanax)
- Cannabis products, e.g., marijuana, hashish, and hashish oil
- Among the dissociatives, phencyclidine (PCP), and ketamine are the most sought after.
- Hallucinogens such as LSD, mescaline, peyote, and psilocybin
- Entactogens like MDMA ("ecstasy")
- Among the narcotics, it is opiates such as morphine and codeine, and opioids such as diacetylmorphine (Heroin), hydrocodone (Vicodin; Hycodan), oxycodone (Percocet; Oxycontin), hydromorphone (Dilaudid), and oxymorphone (Opana).
- Sedatives such as GHB and methaqualone (Quaalude)
- Stimulants such as cocaine, amphetamine (Adderall), dextroamphetamine (Dexedrine), methamphetamine (Desoxyn), methcathinone, and methylphenidate (Ritalin)

The regulation of the above drugs varies in many countries. Alcohol possession and consumption by adults is today widely banned only in Islamic countries and certain states of India. Although alcohol prohibition was eventually repealed in the countries that enacted it, there are, for example, still parts of the United States that do not allow alcohol sales, though alcohol possession may be legal (see dry counties). New Zealand has banned the importation of chewing tobacco as part of the Smoke-free Environments Act 1990. In some parts of the world, provisions are made for the use of traditional sacraments like ayahuasca, iboga, and peyote. In Gabon, iboga (tabernanthe iboga) has been declared a national treasure and is used in rites of the Bwiti religion. The active ingredient, ibogaine, is proposed as a treatment of opioid withdrawal and various substance use disorders.

In countries where alcohol and tobacco are legal, certain measures are frequently undertaken to discourage use of these drugs. For example, packages of alcohol and tobacco sometimes communicate warnings directed towards the consumer, communicating the potential risks of partaking in the use of the substance. These drugs also frequently have special sin taxes associated with the purchase thereof, in order to recoup the losses associated with public funding for the health problems the use causes in long-term users. Restrictions on advertising also exist in many countries, and often a state holds a monopoly on manufacture, distribution, marketing, and/or the sale of these drugs.

=== List of principal drug prohibition laws by jurisdiction (non-exhaustive) ===
- Australia: Standard for the Uniform Scheduling of Medicines and Poisons
- Bangladesh: Narcotics Substances Control Act, 2018
- Belize: Misuse of Drugs Act (Belize)
- Canada: Controlled Drugs and Substances Act
- Estonia: Narcotic Drugs and Psychotropic Substances Act (Estonia)
- Germany: Narcotic Drugs Act
- India: Narcotic Drugs and Psychotropic Substances Act (India)
- Netherlands: Opium Law
- New Zealand: Misuse of Drugs Act 1975
- Pakistan: Control of Narcotic Substances Act 1997
- Philippines: Comprehensive Dangerous Drugs Act of 2002
- Poland: Drug Abuse Prevention Act 2005
- Portugal: Decree-Law 15/93
- Ireland: Misuse of Drugs Act (Ireland)
- South Africa: Drugs and Drug Trafficking Act 1992
- Singapore: Misuse of Drugs Act (Singapore)
- Sweden: Lag om kontroll av narkotika (SFS 1992:860)
- Thailand: Psychotropic Substances Act (Thailand) and Narcotics Act
- United Kingdom: Misuse of Drugs Act 1971 and Drugs Act 2005
- United States: Controlled Substances Act
- International: Single Convention on Narcotic Drugs

=== Legal dilemmas ===
The sentencing statutes in the United States Code that cover controlled substances are complicated. For example, a first-time offender convicted in a single proceeding for selling marijuana three times, and found to have carried a gun on him all three times (even if it were not used) is subject to a minimum sentence of 55 years in federal prison.

In Hallucinations: Behavior, Experience, and Theory (1975), senior US government researchers Louis Jolyon West and Ronald K. Siegel explain how drug prohibition can be used for selective social control:

The role of drugs in the exercise of political control is also coming under increasing discussion. Control can be through prohibition or supply. The total or even partial prohibition of drugs gives the government considerable leverage for other types of control. An example would be the selective application of drug laws ... against selected components of the population such as members of certain minority groups or political organizations.

Linguist Noam Chomsky argues that drug laws are currently, and have historically been, used by the state to oppress sections of society it opposes:

Very commonly substances are criminalized because they're associated with what's called the dangerous classes, poor people, or working people. So for example in England in the 19th century, there was a period when gin was criminalized and whiskey wasn't, because gin is what poor people drink.

=== Legal highs and prohibition ===
In 2013 the European Monitoring Centre for Drugs and Drug Addiction reported that there are 280 new legal drugs, known as "legal highs", available in Europe. One of the best known, mephedrone, was banned in the United Kingdom in 2010. On November 24, 2010, the U.S. Drug Enforcement Administration announced it would use emergency powers to ban many synthetic cannabinoids within a month. An estimated 73 new psychoactive synthetic drugs appeared on the UK market in 2012. The response of the Home Office has been to create a temporary class drug order which bans the manufacture, import, and supply (but not the possession) of named substances.

=== Corruption ===
In certain countries, there is concern that campaigns against drugs and organized crime are a cover for corrupt officials tied to drug trafficking themselves. In the United States, Federal Bureau of Narcotics chief Harry Anslinger's opponents accused him of taking bribes from the Mafia to enact prohibition and create a black market for alcohol. More recently in the Philippines, one death squad hitman told author Niko Vorobyov that he was being paid by military officers to eliminate those drug dealers who failed to pay a 'tax'. Under President Rodrigo Duterte, the Philippines has waged a bloody war against drugs that may have resulted in up to 29,000 extrajudicial killings.

When it comes to social control with cannabis, there are different aspects to consider. Not only do we assess legislative leaders and the way they vote on cannabis, but we also must consider the federal regulations and taxation that contribute to social controls. For instance, according to a report on the U.S. customs and border protections, the American industry, although banned the main usage of marijuana, was still using products similar such as hemp seeds, oils etc. leading to the previously discussed marijuana tax act.

The Tax act provisions required importers to register and pay an annual tax of $24 and receive an official stamp. Stamps for Products were then affixed to each original order form and recorded by the state revenue collector. Then, a customs collector was to maintain the custody of imported marijuana at entry ports until required documents were received, reviewed and approved.Shipments were subject to searches, seizures and forfeitures if any provisions of the law were not met. Violations would result in fines of no more than $2000 or potential imprisonment for up to 5 years. Oftentimes, this created opportunity for corruption, stolen imports that would later lead to smuggling, oftentimes by state officials and tight knit elitists.

== Penalties ==
=== United States ===
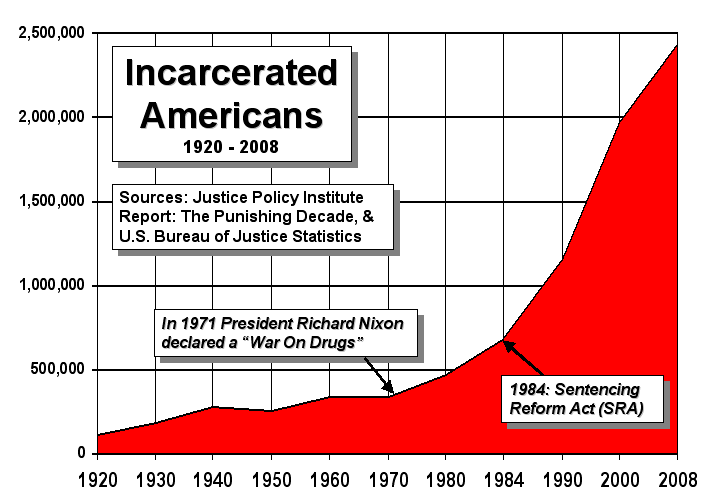
Total incarceration in the United States by year

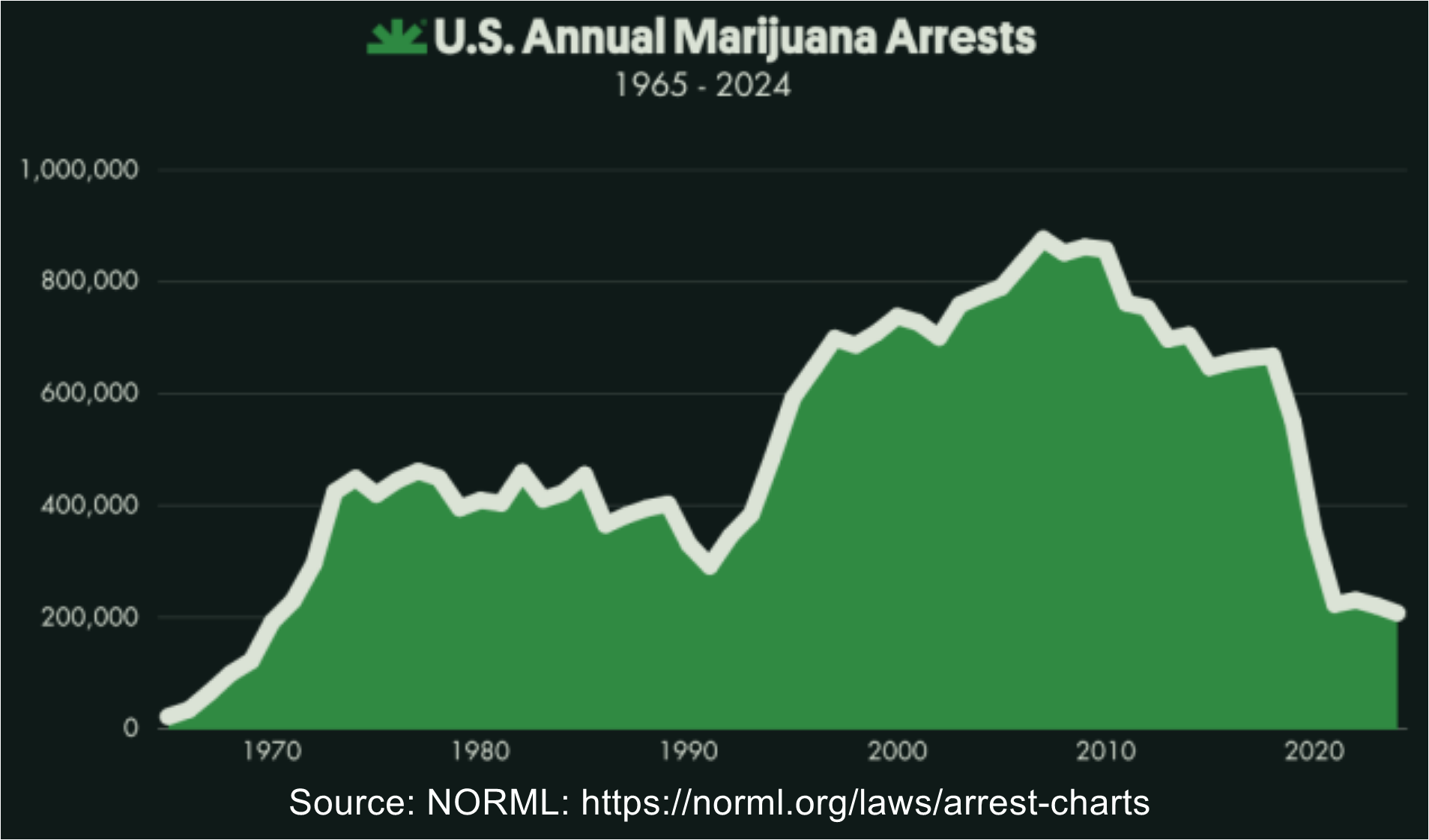
US annual marijuana arrests. From NORML.

Drug possession is the crime of having one or more illegal drugs in one's possession, either for personal use, distribution, sale or otherwise. Illegal drugs fall into different categories and sentences vary depending on the amount, type of drug, circumstances, and jurisdiction. In the U.S., the penalty for illegal drug possession and sale can vary from a small fine to a prison sentence. In some states, marijuana possession is considered to be a petty offense, with the penalty being comparable to that of a speeding violation. In some municipalities, possessing a small quantity of marijuana in one's own home is not punishable at all. Generally, however, drug possession is an arrestable offense, although first-time offenders rarely serve jail time. Federal law makes even possession of "soft drugs", such as cannabis, illegal, though some local governments have laws contradicting federal laws.

In the U.S., the war on drugs is thought to be contributing to a prison overcrowding problem. In 1996, 59.6% of prisoners were drug-related criminals. The U.S. population grew by about +25% from 1980 to 2000. In that same 20 year time period, the U.S. prison population tripled, making the U.S. the world leader in both percentage and absolute number of citizens incarcerated. The United States has 5% of the world's population, but 25% of the prisoners.

About 90% of United States prisoners are incarcerated in state jails. In 2016, about 572,000, over 44%, of the 1.3 million people in these state jails, were serving time for drug offenses. 728,000 were incarcerated for violent offenses.

The data from Federal Bureau of Prisons online statistics page states that 45.9% of prisoners were incarcerated for drug offenses, as of December 2021.

=== European Union ===
In 2004, the Council of the European Union adopted a framework decision harmonizing the minimum penal provisions for illicit drug-related activities. In particular, article 2(9) stipulates that activities may be exempt from the minimum provisions "when it is committed by its perpetrators exclusively for their own personal consumption as defined by national law." This was made, in particular, to accommodate more liberal national systems such as the Dutch coffee shops (see below) or the Spanish Cannabis Social Clubs.

==== The Netherlands ====
In the Netherlands, cannabis and other "soft" drugs are decriminalised in small quantities. The Dutch government treats the problem as more of a public health issue than a criminal issue. Contrary to popular belief, cannabis is still technically illegal. Coffee shops that sell cannabis to people 18 or above are tolerated, and pay taxes like any other business for their cannabis and hashish sales, although distribution is a grey area that the authorities would rather not go into as it is not decriminalised. Many "coffee shops" are found in Amsterdam and cater mainly to the large tourist trade; the local consumption rate is far lower than in the US.

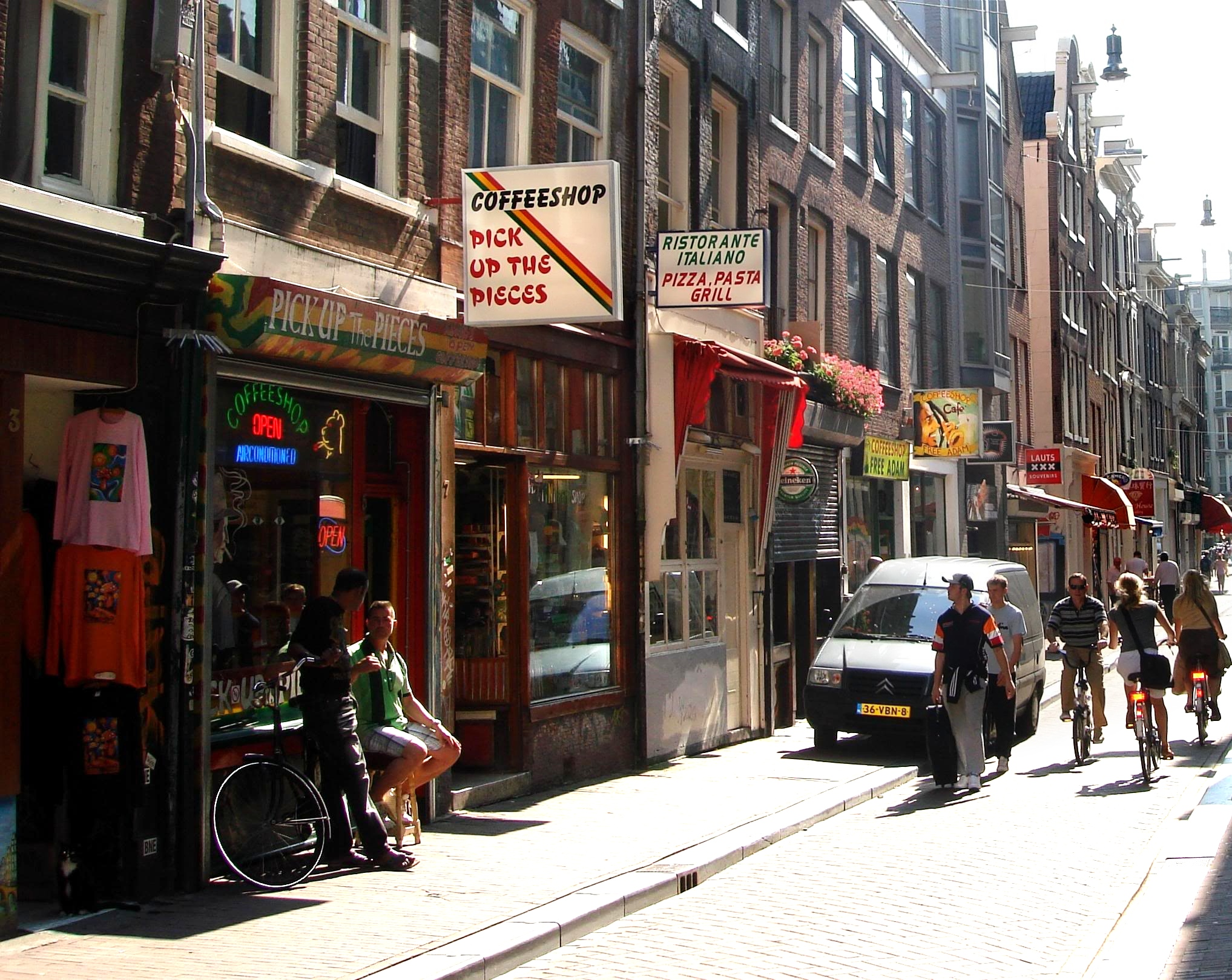
Coffeeshop in Amsterdam

The administrative bodies responsible for enforcing the drug policies include the Ministry of Health, Welfare and Sport, the Ministry of Justice, the Ministry of the Interior and Kingdom Relations, and the Ministry of Finance. Local authorities also shape local policy, within the national framework.

When compared to other countries, Dutch drug consumption falls in the European average at six per cent regular use (twenty-one per cent at some point in life) and considerably lower than the Anglo-Saxon countries headed by the United States with an eight per cent recurring use (thirty-four at some point in life).

=== Australia ===
A Nielsen poll in 2012 found that only 27% of voters favoured decriminalisation. Australia has steep penalties for growing and using drugs even for personal use. with Western Australia having the toughest laws. There is an associated anti-drug culture amongst a significant number of Australians. Law enforcement targets drugs, particularly in the party scene. In 2012, crime statistics in Victoria revealed that police were increasingly arresting users rather than dealers, and the Liberal government banned the sale of bongs that year.

=== Indonesia ===
Indonesia carries a maximum penalty of death for drug dealing, and a maximum of 15 years prison for drug use. In 2004, Australian citizen Schapelle Corby was convicted of smuggling 4.4 kilograms of cannabis into Bali, a crime that carried a maximum penalty of death. Her trial reached the verdict of guilty with a punishment of 20 years imprisonment. Corby claimed to be an unwitting drug mule. Australian citizens known as the "Bali Nine" were caught smuggling heroin. Two of the nine, Andrew Chan and Myuran Sukumaran, were executed April 29, 2015 along with six other foreign nationals. In August 2005, Australian model Michelle Leslie was arrested with two ecstasy pills. She pleaded guilty to possession and in November 2005 was sentenced to 3 months imprisonment, which she was deemed to have already served, and was released from prison immediately upon her admission of guilt on the charge of possession.

At the 1961 Single Convention on Narcotic Drugs, Indonesia, along with India, Turkey, Pakistan and some South American countries opposed the criminalisation of drugs.

=== Republic of China (Taiwan) ===
Taiwan carries a maximum penalty of death for drug trafficking, while smoking tobacco and wine are classified as legal entertainment drug. The Department of Health is in charge of drug prohibition.

== Cost ==
In 2020, the direct cost of drug prohibition to United States taxpayers was estimated at over $40 billion annually. Prohibition can increase organized crime, government corruption, and mass incarceration via the trade in illegal drugs, while racial and gender disparities in enforcement are evident.

Although drug prohibition is often portrayed by proponents as a measure to improve public health, evidence is lacking. In 2016, the Johns Hopkins–Lancet Commission concluded that the "harms of prohibition far outweigh the benefits", citing increased risk of overdoses and HIV infection and detrimental effects on the social determinants of health. Some proponents argue that drug prohibition's effect on suppressing usage rates (although the magnitude of this effect is unknown) outweighs the negative effects of prohibition.

Alternative approaches to prohibition include drug legalization, drug decriminalization, and government monopoly.

== See also ==
- Alcohol law
- Arguments for and against drug prohibition
- Chasing the Scream
- Drug liberalization
- Demand reduction
- Drug policy of the Soviet Union
- Harm reduction
- List of anti-cannabis organizations
- Medellín Cartel
- Mexican drug war
- Puerto Rican drug war
- Prohibitionism
- Tobacco control

US specific

- Allegations of CIA drug trafficking
- School district drug policies
- Drug Free America Foundation
- Drug Policy Alliance
- DrugWarRant
- Gary Webb
- Marijuana Policy Project
- National Organization for the Reform of Marijuana Laws
- Students for Sensible Drug Policy
- Woman's Christian Temperance Union
