= Drug policy of the United Kingdom =

Drugs considered addictive or dangerous in the United Kingdom are called "controlled substances" and regulated by law. Until 1964 the medical treatment of dependent drug users was separated from the punishment of unregulated use and supply. Under this policy drug use remained low; there was relatively little recreational use and few dependent users, who were prescribed drugs by their doctors as part of their treatment. From 1964 drug use was decreasingly criminalised, with the framework still in place as of 2014 largely determined by the Misuse of Drugs Act.

== History ==
Until 1916, drug use in the UK was hardly controlled, and widely available opium and coca preparations were commonplace.

Between 1916 and 1928 concerns about the use of these drugs by troops on leave from the First World War and then by people associated with the London criminal society gave rise to some controls being implemented. The distribution and use of morphine and cocaine, and later cannabis, were criminalised, but these drugs were available to addicts through doctors; this arrangement became known as the "British system" and was confirmed by the report of the Departmental Committee on Morphine and Heroin Addiction (Rolleston Committee) in 1926.

The Rolleston Report was followed by "a period of nearly forty years of tranquillity in Britain, known as the Rolleston Era. During this period the medical profession regulated the distribution of licit opioid supplies and the provisions of the Dangerous Drugs Acts of 1920 and 1923 controlled illicit supplies." The medical treatment of dependent drug users was separated from the punishment of unregulated use and supply. This policy on drugs was maintained in Britain, and nowhere else, until the 1960s. Under this policy drug use remained low; there was relatively little recreational use and few dependent users, who were prescribed drugs by their doctors as part of their treatment.

It has been argued that the main legal innovations between 1925 and 1964 were in response to international pressures, not domestic problems.

In the 1960s a few doctors prescribed large amounts of heroin, some of which was diverted into the illegal market. Also substances such as cannabis, amphetamines and LSD started to become significant in the UK.

In 1961 the international Single Convention on Narcotic Drugs was introduced. To control global drug trading and use, it banned countries from treating addicts by prescribing illegal substances, allowing only scientific and medical uses of drugs. It was not itself binding on countries, which had to pass their own legislation.

Following pressure from the US, the UK implemented the Drugs (Prevention of Misuse) Act 1964. Although the convention dealt with the problems of drug production and trafficking, rather than the punishment of drug users, the 1964 act introduced criminal penalties for possession by individuals of small amounts of drugs, as well as possession with intent to traffic or deal in drugs. The police were soon given the power to stop and search people for illegal drugs.

Dangerous Drugs (Supply to Addicts) Regulations 1968
- Statutory Instrument
- Parliament of the United Kingdom
- Citation: SI 1968/416

Dates
- Made: 18 March 1968
- Laid before Parliament: 25 March 1968
- Commencement: 16 April 1968

Other legislation
- Made under: Dangerous Drugs Act 1965; Dangerous Drugs Act 1967

Text of statute as originally enacted

The Dangerous Drugs (Supply to Addicts) Regulations 1968 (SI 1968/416) was a statutory instrument that determined the consultants who could prescribe, or treat addicts either in psychiatric hospitals or drug dependency units. Other medical staff, if supervised by the consultants within the hospitals, would also be able to obtain licences. Doctors working outside the NHS would be considered if their organisations had similar facilities to the DDUs. Doctors who disobeyed these regulations might have their permissions to supply rescinded. In fact only the treatment centres were allowed to supply.

The Misuse of Drugs Act 1971 (MDA) was passed, continuing measures in previous legislation, and classifying drugs into classes A (the most highly regulated), B, and C. Penalties for trafficking and supply were increased in the 1980s.

In 1991 a new phase of UK drug legislation started with an attempt to integrate health and criminal justice responses via Schedule 1A6 Probation Orders. This reduced the separation between medical and punitive responses that had characterised the British system in the past.

=== Legislation ===
United Kingdom drug related legislation
Year	Act/Order	Purpose	Legislation
1868	Pharmacy Act 1868	First regulation of poisons and dangerous substances. Limited sales to chemists.	31 & 32 Vict. c. 121
1908	Poisons and Pharmacy Act 1908	Regulations on sale and labelling, including coca.	
1916	Defence of the Realm Act 1914 (Regulation 40B)	Sale and possession of cocaine restricted to "authorised persons".	SR&O 1916/501
1920	Dangerous Drugs Act 1920	Limited production, import, export, possession, sale and distribution of opium, cocaine, morphine or heroin to licensed persons.	10 & 11 Geo. 5. c. 46
1925	Dangerous Drugs Act 1925	Controlled importation of coca leaf and cannabis.	
1928	Regulations under the Dangerous Drugs Act 1920	Criminalised possession of cannabis. Doctors continued to be able to prescribe any drugs as treatments, including for addiction.	
1964	Dangerous Drugs Act 1964	Criminalised cultivation of cannabis following UN 1961 Single Convention.	1964 c. 36
1964	Drugs (Prevention of Misuse) Act 1964	Criminalised possession of amphetamines.	1964 c. 64
1967	Dangerous Drugs Act 1967	Doctors required to notify Home Office of addicted patients. Restriction on prescription of heroin and cocaine for treatment of addiction.	
1971	Misuse of Drugs Act 1971	Introduced classes A, B, and C of drugs. Created offence of "intent to supply". Increased penalties for trafficking and supply (14 years imprisonment for trafficking Class A drugs). Established the Advisory Council on the Misuse of Drugs (ACMD).	1971 c. 38
1985	Controlled Drugs (Penalties) Act 1985	Maximum penalty for trafficking Class A drugs increased to life imprisonment.	
1986	Drug Trafficking Offences Act 1986	Making suspects aware of an investigation criminalised. Police could compel breaches of confidentiality, and could search and seize.	
1991	Criminal Justice Act 1991, Schedule 1A6	A probation order could have attached a condition of attending drug treatment.	1991 c. 53
1998	Crime and Disorder Act 1998	Created the Drug Treatment and Testing Order (DTTO).	
2000	Criminal Justice and Court Services Act 2000	People charged with certain offences could be tested for drugs by police. Created the Drug Abstinence Order, the Drug Abstinence Requirement. Introduced testing for prisoners released subject to supervision.	
2003	Criminal Justice Act 2003	Bail restricted for people charged with certain offences if test indicates Class A drug use. Created the generic Community Order, replacing the DTTO with the Drug Rehabilitation Requirement.	
2003	Anti-social Behaviour Act 2003	Premises used for Class A drugs supply could be closed.	
2005	Drugs Act 2005	Introduced drug testing on arrest. Classified psilocybin mushrooms as drugs. Required treatment assessment could not be refused. Penalties for dealing near schools increased.	
2006	Police and Justice Act 2006	Punitive conditions can be attached to conditional cautioning.	2006 c. 48
2007	Drugs Act 2005 (Commencement No. 5) Order 2007		SI 2007/562
2008	Controlled Drugs (Drug Precursors) (Intra-Community Trade) Regulations 2008		SI 2008/295
2008	Controlled Drugs (Drug Precursors) (Community External Trade) Regulations 2008		SI 2008/296
2008	Misuse of Drugs Act 1971 (Amendment) Order 2008		SI 2008/3130
2009	Misuse of Drugs (Designation) (Amendment) (England, Wales and Scotland) Order 2009		SI 2009/3135
2009	Misuse of Drugs (Amendment) (England, Wales and Scotland) Regulations 2009		SI 2009/3136
2009	Misuse of Drugs Act 1971 (Amendment) Order 2009		SI 2009/3209
2016	Psychoactive Substances Act 2016		2016 c. 2
2016	Misuse of Drugs Act 1971 (Temporary Class Drug) Order 2016		SI 2016/650
2016	Misuse of Drugs Act 1971 (Amendment) Order 2016		SI 2016/1109
2016	Misuse of Drugs Act 1971 (Temporary Class Drug) (No. 2) Order 2016		SI 2016/1126
2017	Misuse of Drugs Act 1971 (Amendment) Order 2017		SI 2017/634
2017	Misuse of Drugs Act 1971 (Amendment) (No. 2) Order 2017		SI 2017/1114
2018	Misuse of Drugs Act 1971 (Amendment) Order 2018		SI 2018/1356
2019	Misuse of Drugs Act 1971 (Amendment) Order 2019		SI 2019/323
2021	Misuse of Drugs Act 1971 (Amendment) Order 2021		SI 2021/868

== Scientific data ==
Drug harms according to the Independent Scientific Committee on Drugs (ISCD) study "Drug Harms in the UK: a multi-criteria decision analysis"

A multicriteria analysis of drugs by drug experts of Imperial College London published in November 2010 found alcohol to be the most harmful drug to both the user and others. Alcohol received a harm score of 72, followed by heroin in second on 55, and crack third on 54. "Heroin, crack, and crystal meth were the most harmful drugs to the individual, whereas alcohol, heroin, and crack were the most harmful to others."

== Support for law reform ==
Anyone's Child are an organisation of people whose family members have been affected by the UK's drug policies and advocate for the legal regulation of drugs. The organisation wants the drug market to be taken from organised crime groups and regulated with regulations including minimum age checks and quality control standards.

The Liberal Democrats support the legalisation and regulation of cannabis in the UK. The Transform Drug Policy Foundation also campaigns for the legalisation and regulation of cannabis in the UK.

The Green Party of England and Wales stated in its 2024 election manifesto that it supports "a National Commission to agree an evidence-based approach to reform of the UK's counterproductive drug laws" and supports the decriminalisation of the personal possession of drugs.

== See also ==
- Beckley Foundation
- Cannabis in the United Kingdom
- Crime in the United Kingdom
- Drug Equality Alliance
- Drug policy
- Drug-related deaths in the United Kingdom
- Drugs controlled by the UK Misuse of Drugs Act
- List of British politicians who have acknowledged cannabis use
- List of statutory instruments of the United Kingdom, list of links to instruments for each year
- Release
