= Drug crisis in Scotland =

Scottish drug death crisis

Drug misuse mortality rate in Scotland in 2017–2021 mapped

The drug crisis in Scotland (also known as the drug deaths crisis or drug epidemic) is an ongoing crisis regarding mortality rates over drug related/misuse deaths in the country. Drug related deaths started to rise during the 1980s. From 2015 onwards the mortality rate of drug misuse deaths in Scotland has increased rapidly, prompting calls of a 'national emergency' within the country over the crisis.

== Background ==
Drug related (or misuse) mortality rates have begun to rise in Scotland since the 1980s. A variety of factors can be considered to be behind the beginning of the epidemic; Neo-liberal economic restructuring in the 1980s caused parts of large cities in Scotland to go into terminal decline causing income inequality to rise and increased inner city deprivation with the working-class population particularly affected. An additional factor of heroin markets from Afghanistan and Iran becoming more easy to access and smuggle into Europe in the 1980s made the drug more accessible and affordable than ever. In the early-1990s, those born in the 1970s, termed as the 'Trainspotting generation', began to enter the labour market. High unemployment and especially in deprived areas is generally seen as the hypothesis of increased drug use within this generation, having been exposed to the phenomenon during the 1980s.

In 2008, the Scottish National Party and the Scottish Conservatives reached a deal to pass that year's Scottish budget, where the drugs strategy would be rewritten to potentially put more stress on promoting abstinence and reduce the use of methadone.

Since 2015, mortality rates have dramatically increased, doubling from their previous numbers a decade ago. A factor of this can be traced to the more recent ageing of the so called 'Trainspotting generation' (those who grew up in the 1980s and 1990s) which has given rise to increased mortality rates. Funding cuts in 2016 by the Scottish Government reduced drug and alcohol prevention services funding by 20%, though by 2019 this had been restored. Additional reasons may be related to the failings of the UK's drug policy due to drug policy not being a devolved policy issue within Scotland.

== Mortality rates ==
Drug crisis in images

Scottish mortality rates to drug misuse and related deaths are the highest in Europe, and higher than the United States. This rate is 3.5 times higher than England and Wales.

Graphs of deaths to different drugs in Scotland

Opioids and Opiates

Benzodiazepines

Other significant drugs

=== Council areas ===
City council areas have a higher mortality rate than predominately rural areas. This is especially poignant in Dundee and Glasgow which have the worst drug-misuse mortality rate in the country (two times higher than the national average). In the City of Edinburgh, drug related deaths tripled from the period of 2000 to 2004 and 2016 to 2020.

=== Types of drugs ===
Traditionally, opioids have been the main drug and consist of the majority of drug-related deaths in Scotland when a drug can be implicated. However, since 2015, benzodiazepines, more prominently street Benzodiazepines, cocaine and gabapentin, have risen dramatically in implicated drugs. Street Benzodiazepines account for 72% of drug related deaths, in certain areas of Scotland this figure changes. For example, in the City of Dundee this rises to 82% of deaths implicated.

=== Gender divide ===
Men have double the mortality rate to drug misuse than women. Approximately 72% of victims to drug misuse were male in 2019 to 28% females.

=== Age divide ===
35-year-olds to 54-year-olds (this consists of two defined age groups) have the highest mortality rate compared to older and younger generations, this accounts for two-thirds of drug-misuse/related deaths. This feature is different to the United States in which opioid overdoses are from younger users.

=== Socio-economic element ===
People who live in the most deprived areas have a 18 times higher mortality rate than those living in the least deprived areas of Scotland. One in five in Scotland live below the poverty threshold, exacerbating the crisis.

== Policy proposals ==
Policy proposals to tackle the crisis have been suggested:

- Drug consumption rooms (DCR): Scottish Government ministers have advocated and began to pilot for rooms in which long-term addicts would be able to access clean needles to do drugs, which would potentially stop the spread of HIV from used and shared needles. This policy proposal has been opposed by the UK government and the Scottish Conservatives, who believe it would create an attitude of acceptance around drug use and criminal activity. However, others argue not only would it help counter the spread of diseases but also encourage addicts into treatment, save lives and get needles off of city streets. A pilot unit opened in Glasgow in January 2025.
- Decriminalisation of drugs for personal possession and use: drug decriminalisation has been proposed to allow for drug users to be "treated and supported rather than criminalised and excluded" and enable recovered drug users a better chance of employment without a criminal record. The move is supported by doctors, academics, recovery groups and former drug addicts. It is argued that drug users often can't afford fines, that prison time makes their addictions worse and that the money and resources saved on forcing drug addicts through courts and prison sentences could instead be used to target criminal drug gangs. However, drug policy is not a devolved matter and is controlled by the UK government.
- Harm reduction measures and rehab programmes: alongside other measures such as decriminalisation and drug consumption rooms, it is often emphasised that adequate resources need to be given to harm reduction measures and rehab programmes. Examples of harm reduction measures include drug checking and increased access to naloxone.

== Treatment ==
In 2019, approximately 40% of drug users in Scotland were in treatment, while the figure was closer to 60% in England.

== See also ==
- Drug policy of the United Kingdom
- Drug-related deaths in the United Kingdom
- Minister for Drugs and Alcohol Policy
- Needle and syringe programmes
- Reagent testing
- War on drugs
