= Drug class (disambiguation) =

Drug class may refer to:

- Drug class, a chemical or pharmacological classification of drugs

Drug class may also refer to category of legal restriction:

- Drugs controlled by the UK Misuse of Drugs Act, the United Kingdom legal classification
- Classes of drugs in the Controlled Substances Act in the United States are called "schedules"

== See also ==
- Drug classification: making a hash of it?, a report on the Misuse of Drugs Act
