= DrugScope =

UK health education charity (2000–2019)

DrugScope was a British-based charity. The organisation was for those working in the drugs field and its aim was to inform the public about drugs, shape policy and reduce drug-related harms. It closed on 31 March 2015.

== History ==
DrugScope was formed in the year 2000 from the merger of the Institute for the Study of Drug Dependence (ISDD) and the Standing Conference on Drug Abuse (SCODA).

The charity provided information on drugs and drug use, maintaining a searchable database of over 100,000 books and journals, an online directory of treatment and other drugs services in England and Wales, a daily subscription drug and alcohol news service, and with representatives regularly in the media contributing to articles about drugs.

It published a bi-monthly magazine called Druglink, geared at those working or studying in the drugs field. It also produced a website for Key Stage 3 children (aged 11 to 14) called D-World.

== See also ==
- Drug Equality Alliance
