= Haridas Viharidas Desai =

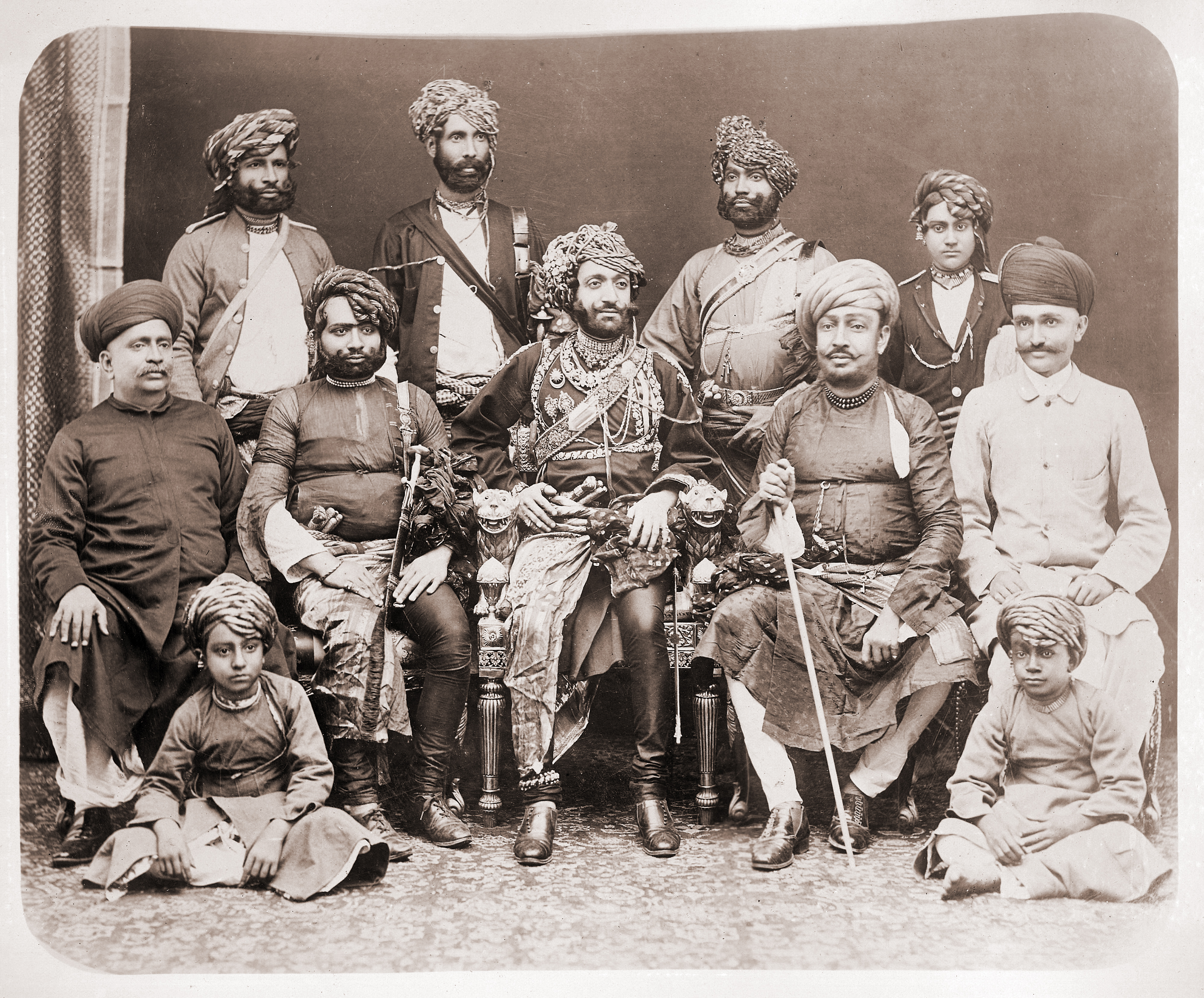
Nawab Bahadur Khanji III of Junagadh with Diwan Haridas Viharidas Desai and other State officials

Haridas Viharidas Desai (1840–1895) was Diwan of Junagadh state from 1883 onwards. He was a pious man and a brilliant administrator who in a decade made the most important reforms in every department of the Junagadh state. He built the 12,000 steps up Mt Girnar for the pilgrims ( he collected funds of 3 lacs from public through lottery, he constructed roads that connected Jungadh to Girnar, temples of Narsinh Mehta and Damodar Kund ( all at his cost ), and construction of the railway line joining the capital of Junagadh to Veraval, the principal port and connecting them both to the railway system of India.

In 1895 he was appointed by Queen Victoria along with Maharaja Lakshmeshwar Singh to be part of the Royal Opium Commission. The team consisted of 7 British and 2 Indians. For serving admirably on the royal commission Thomas Brassey, 1st Earl Brassey who was the chairman of the commission had proposed to the British government for conferment of Knighthood on Diwan Saheb, which did not take place due to his sudden and untimely death after a brief illness on 17 June 1895 at Nadiad ni haveli. The whole town mourned his death and newspaper articles in India and abroad lamented his death. The Amrit Bazar Patrika (Calcutta), dated 30 June 1895 remarked "In him India has lost one of her best sons". London (Editorial)September 1895 remarked "By the death of Mr Haridas Viharidas, India has suffered a great and lamentable loss. People of India had no more unselfish, simple minded and enlightened champion." Swami Vivekananda wrote in a letter dated 2 March 1896 from New York to Tatya Saheb, nephew of Haridasji "your uncle was a great soul and his whole life was given to do good to his country. He was a strong noble friend and India has lost a good deal in losing him".

== Friendship with Swami Vivekananda ==
During Swamiji's first visit to Junagadh he was a guest of Diwanji in 1892. Diwanji was so charmed with Swamiji's company that every evening with all the state officials he would meet Swamiji and converse till late at night. Diwanji found in Swamiji unique personality and teacher and Swamiji in turn loved and respected him as a son does his father. The exchanged several letters, in one of the letters dated 22 August 1892 Swamiji wrote to Diwanji "The world really is enriched by men, high souled, noble minded and kind like you, rest are only abortions as some sanskrit poet says". On 22 May 1893 Swamiji wrote from Khetri "Believe me that I love you and respect your like a father and that my gratitude towards you and your family is surely unbounded. Diwanji Saheb, I am the same frolicsome, mischievous but I assure you the innocent boy, you found me at Junagadh and my love for your noble self is the same or increased a hundredfold because I have had a mental comparison between yourself and the Diwans of dearly all the states in the Dakshin and the Lord be my witness how my tongue was fluent in your praise ( although I know that my power are quite inadequate to estimate your noble qualities) in every southern state".

Swamiji continued to guide him in regards of the state that helped him to keep good relations with Nawab of Junagadh and the British Government. Swamiji wrote from Poona on 15 June 1892 "Perhaps by this time every hitch has been removed from your way in Junagadh, at least I hope so". Again when Diwanji was in distress, Swamiji wrote to him from Bombay 22 May 1893 "Often and often we see that the very best of men are even troubled and visited with tribulations in this world, it may be inexplicable but it is also the experience of my life that the heart and core of every thing here is good, that whatever may be the surface of waves, deep down and underlying every thing there is an infinite basis of goodness and love and so long as we do not reach that basis we are troubled but once reached that zone of calmness, let winds howl and tempest rage, the house which is built upon the rock of ages cannot shake. I thoroughly believe that a good, unselfish and holy man like you whose whole life has been devoted in doing good to others has already reached the basis of firmness which Lord himself has styled as "rest upon Brahma" in Gita".

While Swamiji was on a lecture tour of America after attending the first Parliament of World Religions in 1893, some scandalous charges against his character and conduct were raised by certain vested interests, Diwanji wrote a letter to Mr G.W Hale on 26.6.1894 in staunch defense of his beloved Swamiji. This was a timely and important help that Swamiji received after which Swamiji wrote to him in September 1894, "your kind note to G.W.Hale has been very much gratifying as I owed them that much".
