= Alfred Jefferis Turner =

Australian pediatrician and entomologist (1861 – 1947)

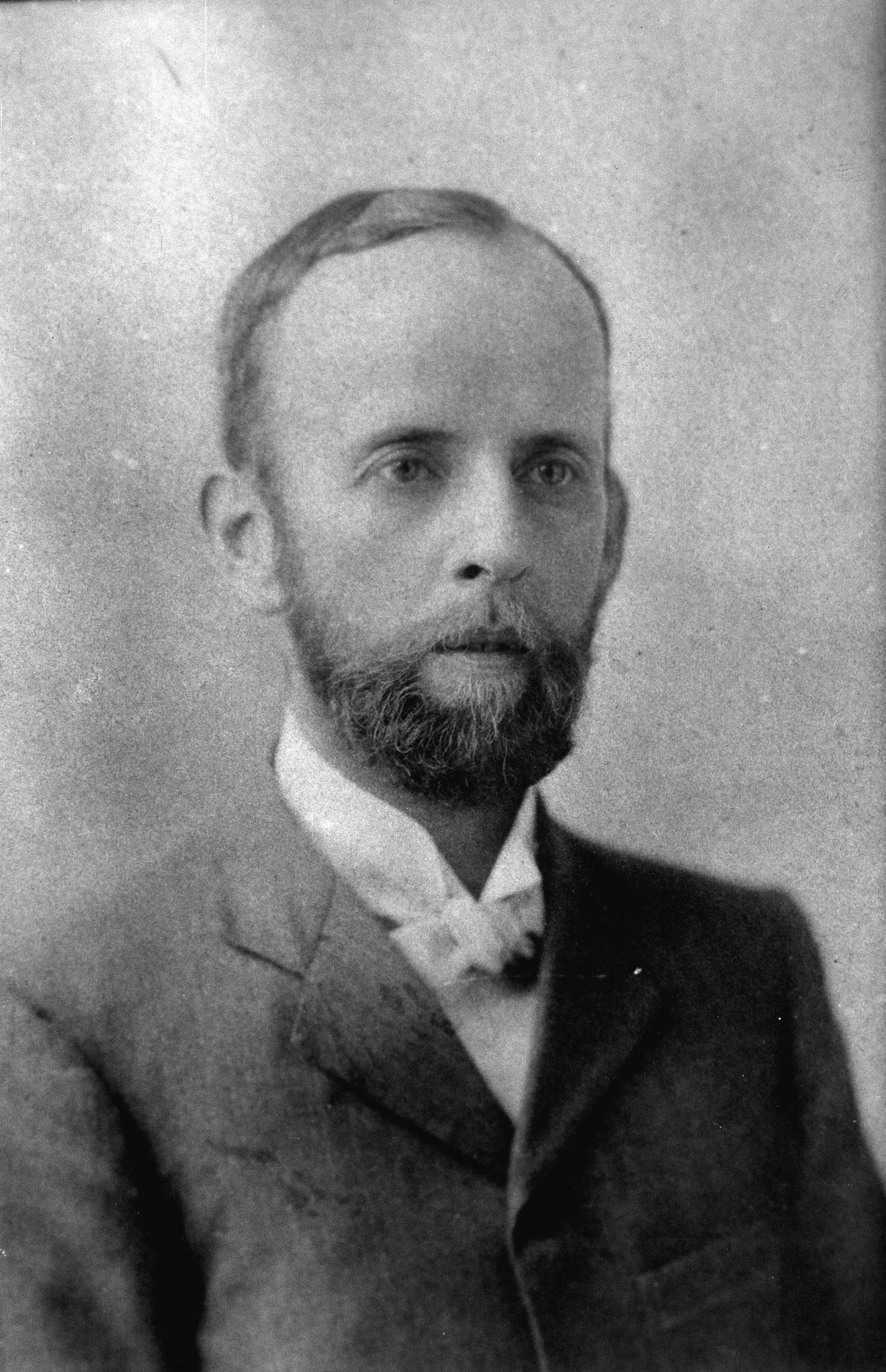
- Doctor Alfred Jefferis Turner
- Born: 3 October 1861; Canton, Great Qing
- Died: 29 December 1947 (aged 86); Brisbane, Australia
- Occupations: Pediatrician, entomologist
- Spouse: Hilda Constance Roehricht
- Parent(s): Frederick Storrs-Turner, Sophia Mary Harmer

Alfred Jefferis Turner (3 October 1861 in Canton – 29 December 1947 in Brisbane, Queensland, Australia) was a pediatrician and amateur entomologist. He was the son of missionary Frederick Storrs-Turner. He introduced the use of diphtheria antitoxin to Australia in 1895, and resided in Dauphin Terrace, Highgate Hill, Brisbane.

The Jefferis Turner Centre for mothercraft was opened in 1952 as part of the Queensland Government's Maternal and Child Welfare program. In 1986, its role was changed to provide short-term respite care for intellectually disabled children. It is located in the heritage building Fairy Knoll in Ipswich.

== Medical career ==
Turner studied medicine at University College London graduating with first class honours. He emigrated to Australia in 1888 and the next year became first medical officer of the Royal Children's Hospital, Brisbane (then known as the Hospital for Sick Children).

Turner's clinical research and influence helped to reduce the number of children's deaths in Queensland. He contributed in the areas of diphtheria antitoxin, hookworm-induced anaemia, lead poisoning, children's milk supply quality improvement, health education for expectant and nursing mothers and antenatal clinic establishment in Queensland.

Turner played a pivotal role in combating the bubonic plague epidemic of 1900 and in making the notification of tuberculosis compulsory in 1904. Due to his mild manner and love of children, he acquired the nickname of "Gentle Annie".

== Entomological activity ==
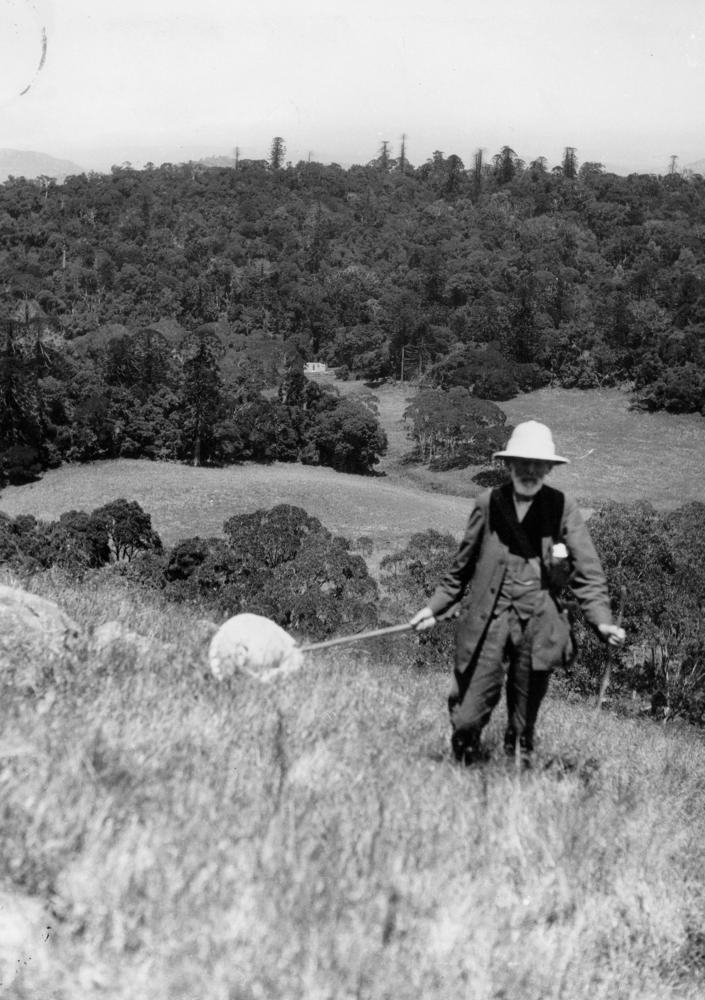
Alfred Jefferis Turner in the Bunya Mountains on an entomological excursion, 1925.

Turner was an amateur entomologist who specialised in Lepidoptera and left his collection of over 50,000 moth specimens to the Council for Scientific and Industrial Research, Canberra.
