= Opium Trading in Mumbai =

Historical industry

The Bombay Opium Trade started in the late eighteenth century and was an incredibly profitable industry that played a significant role in shaping the economic and social landscape of Bombay. At this time, India was a major producer of opium, and the British East India Company held a monopoly on its production. Indigenous merchants, traders, and smugglers were central figures in this trade, despite the Company's regulatory efforts. Smuggling was an effective method for evading legal restrictions and taxes imposed on the opium trade. Indigenous smugglers used hidden routes and operated covertly to transport and sell opium. This effort sustained and expanded the opium industry, which had widespread economic consequences, including the development of a capitalist class in Bombay.

== History (late 18th century to 1831) ==
Starting in the mid to late eighteenth century, the British East India Company had a firm grasp on its opium monopoly. However, around the turn of the nineteenth century, the British supply, which came from its territories in Eastern India, specifically Bengal, was not sufficient to meet the demands of China, with whom the British traded most of their opium. Other regions in India, such as Malwa, were able to account for this deficit in British opium production, thereby posing a threat to the British monopoly.

Malwa opium was introduced into the opium trade with China possibly as early as 1770. At the start of the eighteenth century, up to 1000 crates of Malwa opium were shipped from Bombay and traded with China annually. In an effort to maintain their monopoly, the Governor-General of the Company ordered the Bombay Presidency government to stop opium cultivation in the region and therefore to remove this competing opium from the market. This was done in 1803 but to little effect, since the opium shipped from Bombay was cultivated in Malwa, a region outside the control of the Bombay government. In addition to cultivation, it became illegal in 1805 to move and ship opium from British territories and ports in Western India.

However, the Malwa opium trade persisted with increasing success. This was partly due to Malwa opium’s comparatively lower market price and the fact that Malwa had an established practice of opium cultivation since at least the sixteenth century. However, the growth of the Bombay Malwa opium trade was due in large part to Indian efforts to circumvent the export restrictions placed on opium. Many Indian merchants and businesspeople had a vested interest in the Bombay opium market prior to British intervention, and in order to protect these interests a great number of traders began smuggling. Without access to Bombay ports, Bombay traders turned to indigenous groups and regional elites for alternative avenues. After 1805, exporting out of Bombay became difficult, and many Bombay firms and merchants turned to smuggling Malwa opium through the Gujarat coast.

The continued growth of the Malwa opium market and the export of Malwa opium forced the East India Company to switch strategies. In 1819, the British decided to involve themselves in Malwa opium and in Bombay opium auctions, hoping to become the sole supplier of Malwa opium. The British struggled to form a monopoly over Malwa opium as they did with Bengal opium. Unlike the opium grown in Bengal directly under British control, the opium grown in Malwa remained under the authority of princely rulers and indirectly under the control of the British. Lacking sufficient connections to directly procure opium from the Malwa market, the Company had to at first turn to private Bombay merchants and firms to facilitate transactions between Company buyers and Malwa producers of opium. Once the British established relations with the various princely rulers in the region of Malwa, they endeavored to form treaties with the indigenously ruled states to regulate the sale of opium. As part of these treaties, most of which were signed in 1926, the British fixed the price of sale.

According to a February 1830 conversation recorded in the Journal of the House of Lords, the official minute book of the House of Lords of British Parliament, between the Lord President and John Walter Shreher, a British official deputed in Malwa, this fixed price was grossly short of what the private Bombay merchants and firms usually paid:

“[Lord President:] ‘Did he further stipulate to furnish any quantity of opium at a certain price to the Company?’

[John Walter Shreher:] ‘He did.’

‘Was that price much below the price at which it had been obtained by the Bombay Agents?’

‘Considerably.’

‘Can you state the difference?’

‘The Bombay Agent had paid from sixty-five to one hundred and odd Rupees for a Punsury, which is five Siers; a Punsury contains ten pounds English weight.’

‘What did you pay under the Treaty?’

‘Thirty Rupees.’”

During these years (1805-1830) there were 121 indigenous opium trading firms/merchants in Bombay that were independent of the British, as opposed to only 25 non-indigenous firms in the region. In 1831, the British, having found that complete control of the Malwa opium market remained elusive, partly owing to their unimpressive efforts to fix the price of sale, made private export of opium legal upon payment of a duty.

== Impact ==
The development of a capitalist class in Bombay would not have occurred without covert resistance to British exploitative monopolizing efforts in the region. Opium, as early as 1803, provided a vital opportunity for capital formation in Bombay. According to Farooqui, private and indigenous enterprises in opium directly contributed to Bombay becoming the center of economic activity in Western India and was the impetus for major industrial development in the city. From early on, the private sector of Bombay resisted British economic exploitation and this set the tone for later economic development such as Indian control over Bombay’s cotton textile industry in the mid-nineteenth century.

== See also ==
- History of opium in China
- Opium Wars
- Royal Commission on Opium

== Bibliography ==
- “Affairs of the East India Company: Minutes of evidence, 26 February 1830.” In Journal of the House of Lords 62, 1830, (London: His Majesty's Stationery Office, [n.d.]), 925-931. British History Online, accessed November 11, 2023, http://www.british-history.ac.uk/lords-jrnl/vol62/pp925-931.
- Charles, Molly. “The Growth and Activities of Organized Crime in Bombay.” International Social Science Journal 53, no. 169 (2001): 359-367. https://onlinelibrary.wiley.com/doi/10.1111/1468-2451.00323.
- Farooqui, Amar. Smuggling as Subversion: Colonialism, Indian Merchants, and the Politics of Opium 1790-1843. Lexington Books, 2005. https://archive.org/details/smugglingassubve0000faro/mode/2up.
- Farooqui, Amar. “The Global Career of Indian Opium and Local Destinies.” Almanack (Guarulhos, São Paulo, Brazil), no. 14 (2016): 52-73. https://www.scielo.br/j/alm/a/BJ8KKLVMZk9zBYwDXNKbbXc/?lang=en.
- Farooqui, Amar. “Urban Development in a Colonial Situation: Early Nineteenth Century Bombay.” Economic and Political Weekly 31, no. 40 (1996): 2746–59. http://www.jstor.org/stable/4404661.
