= Nadiad ni haveli =

General information
- Location: Nadiad, Gujarat, India
- Completed: 1783

Nadiad ni haveli, also called Bhausaheb Desai ni Haveli, is a haveli (traditional mansion) in Nadiad, Gujarat, India. Historically significant, the haveli hosted national figures such as Tatya Tope during the 1857 rebellion, Swami Vivekananda in 1892, and Mahatma Gandhi during the 1918 Kheda Satyagraha. Spanning 9,000 square meters with 249 rooms, the structure features traditional Gujarati timber-brick architecture enriched with colonial and Hindu elements, bronze-covered balconies, rainwater harvesting, and eclectic interiors. Divided among Desai's descendants in 1902, it remains one of the largest privately owned residences in India.

== History ==
The haveli was built in 1783 by Prabhudas, grandfather of Rao Bahadur Viharidas Desai who is popularly known as Bhausaheb Desai. He had inherited desaigiri (landlordship) from his ancestors who were tax collectors under the Mughal Empire. The arrangement continued under the British Raj even as his two sons, Haridas and Bechardas, took over as Diwansahebs to Junagadh state. The haveli was divided between Bhauaheb's five sons, each receiving about 50 rooms, in 1902. It is now owned by their descendants.

Tatya Tope had taken shelter there during the Indian Rebellion of 1857. Swami Vivekananda had stayed and delivered lectures on spiritualism in 1892. Mahatma Gandhi had addressed people in 1918 in what is believed to be the start of the Kheda Satyagraha. Indian physician Zandu Bhatt had died there.

== Architecture ==
The haveli has 249 rooms covering area of about 9,000 square meters. It has wooden carvings, several courtyards and many balconies covered with bronze sheets. It has a rain water harvesting system and an in-house badminton court also. The construction type observed is timber framing with brick infill. The organisation of the house is typical to any traditional house in the Central-Gujarat region with dehli leading to the chowk (courtyard), parsal (intermediate passage space) leading to the medi (inner rooms). The house has been built exactly on the north-south axis and the entrance of the house faces the north direction. The house has several Interior Architecture Elements which represent motifs of Hindu Gods and religious animals like elephants, peacocks and floral patterns on columns and bracket. Though most of the Interior Architecture Elements are simplistic in their expression, the major influences found in the building are colonial. Several pieces of furniture observed in the house were made by replicating imported furniture brought by the family members during their travels. As the owners were avid readers and writers and lover of books, it has been observed that several types of tables were consciously placed in every room of the house and are both imported and custom made. The furniture style observed in the house is eclectic with styles ranging from Hindu, Colonial and Georgian. The materials used in interiors range from wood, ceramic tiles, cut glass and brass hardware. The craft techniques observed are wood carving, wood turning, etched glass, riveting and metal casting.
