= Arthur Upton Fanshawe =

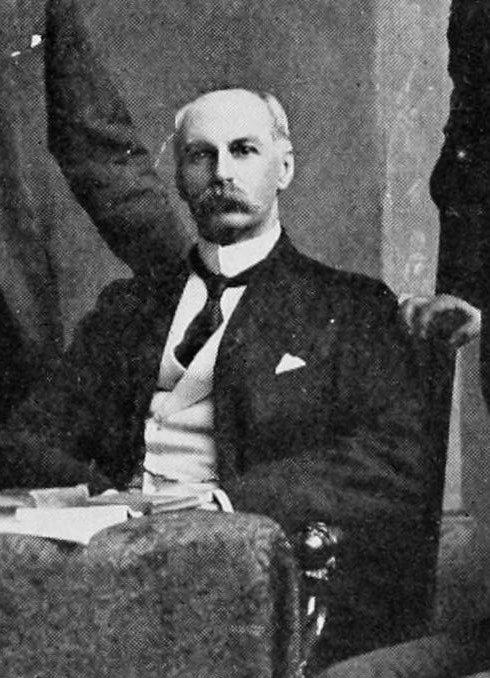
- Sir Arthur Upton Fanshawe in 1898
- Born: 18 December 1848
- Died: 1931, aged 82

Sir Arthur Upton Fanshawe, KCIE, CSI, CVO (1848-1931) was a British civil servant in India during the British Raj. He served primarily in the Indian Post Office.

== Life and career ==
Fanshawe was born in Essex on 18 December 1848, the son of Rev. John Faithfull Fanshawe and elder brother of Herbert Charles Fanshawe, and was educated at Repton School. He passed the Civil Service entrance exam in 1869. He took a post with the Bengal Civil Service in 1871, and was appointed to the position of postmaster for Bombay in 1882. After a stint serving in the Finance and Commerce Department, in 1889 he became the Governor of the Indian Post Office, a position he held until 1906.

In 1893, Queen Victoria announced the creation of a Royal Commission on Opium to regulate the British opium trade in the Far East. Fanshawe, a supporter of the opium trade, was nominated to the Commission by the Indian Government. The Commission's report found that opium use in Asia was not a major problem in Asia and its conclusions effectively removed the opium question from the British public agenda for another 15 years.

Fanshawe was appointed a Knight Commander of the Order of the Indian Empire (KCIE) in the 1903 Durbar Honours.
