= Johns Hopkins–Lancet Commission =

The Johns Hopkins–Lancet Commission on Drug Policy and Health was a commission organized by the Johns Hopkins University and The Lancet, a peer-reviewed medical journal. The commission delivered its report in 2016, finding that the drug prohibition's harms to public health far outweighed its benefits.
