= Drugs (Prevention of Misuse) Act 1964 =

Act of the Parliament of the United Kingdom

Drugs (Prevention of Misuse) Act 1964 (Note: Section 11(1).)
- Act of Parliament
- Parliament of the United Kingdom
- Long title: An Act to penalize the possession, and restrict the importation, of drugs of certain kinds.
- Citation: 1964 c. 64
- Territorial extent: United Kingdom

Dates
- Royal assent: 31 July 1964
- Commencement: 31 July 1964 (section 1(1)(c)); 31 October 1964 (rest of act); (Note: Section 11(2).)
- Repealed: 1 July 1973 (Note: The Misuse of Drugs Act 1971 (Commencement No. 2) Order 1973.)
Other legislation
Amended by	Medicines Act 1968
Repealed by	Misuse of Drugs Act 1971

Status: Repealed

Text of statute as originally enacted

The Drugs (Prevention of Misuse) Act 1964 (c. 64) was an act of the Parliament of the United Kingdom. The importation of lysergamide and its derivatives was restricted by this act.

This act added synthetic amphetamine type drugs to restriction similar to previously restricted drugs such as opium, morphine and cocaine.

== Subsequent developments ==
The whole act was repealed by section 39(2) of, and schedule 5 to, the Misuse of Drugs Act 1971.
