= Royal Commission on Opium =

In 1893-1895 Opium trade in British India. Focusing on the medical impact

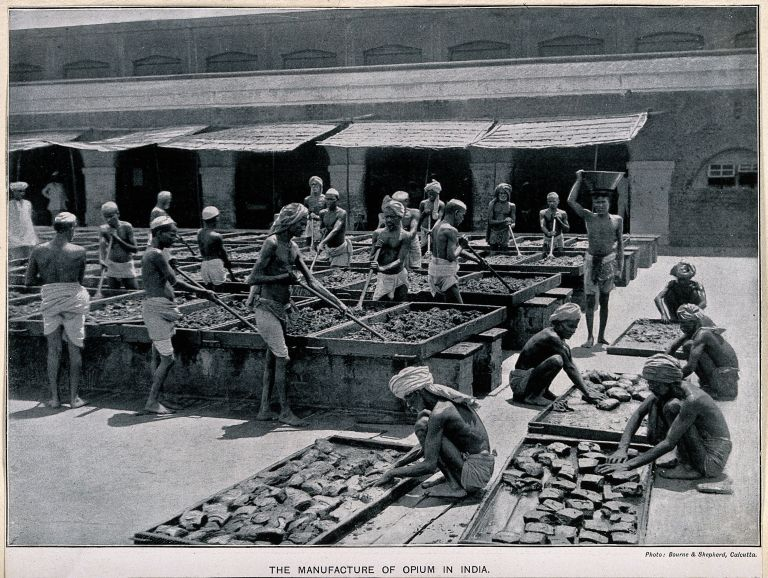
- Created: June 1893
- Ratified: May 1895
- Purpose: Investigation of Indian opium trade

The Royal Commission on Opium was a British Royal Commission that investigated the opium trade in British India in 1893–1895, particularly focusing on the medical effects of opium consumption within India. Set up by Prime Minister William Gladstone’s government in response to political pressure from the anti-opium movement to ban non-medical sales of opium in India, it ultimately defended the existing system in which opium sales to the public were legal but regulated.

== History ==
From the late eighteenth century until independence in 1947, opium was one of the chief sources of revenue for the British in India, raising more than custom duties, alcohol taxes, stamp charges, or the income tax and dwarfed only by taxes on the salt and land. The vast majority of that revenue was gained through the regulated export of processed opium from Calcutta or Bombay to China and to Southeast Asia. It was these exports of Indian opium that sparked the Opium Wars between the UK and China. The small proportion of opium that remained in India was sold under a licensed regime, with 10,118 shops selling opium to the general public across the subcontinent, with only one for every 21,000 people.

These sales within India were termed "excise" by the colonial state. While they were a relatively small proportion of all opium produced, they grew in significance over the course of the nineteenth century as China began to grow more opium. In addition, they were seen as important by activists as part of the larger imperial system. Regulating opium more harshly in India was thought by those opposed to the opium trade to be a way of enabling further regulation of sales to East and Southeast Asia as well.

While the early years of the Asian opium trade in the 1830s and 1840s saw some criticism of the trade in Britain, including by the Earl of Shaftesbury, it was not until the 1890s that the anti-opium shifted its attention to the harm opium was doing in India, rather than in China. On 10 April 1891, the anti-opium movement managed to get a motion passed in the House of Commons of the United Kingdom that urged an end to non-medical sales of opium in India, though with an amendment that would compensate the Government of India for any losses in revenue.

Later, in 1893, under Prime Minister William Ewart Gladstone's Liberal government, anti-opium pressures again prevailed and Parliament approved the appointment of a Royal Commission on Opium. The terms of reference for the Royal Commission initially proposed by Alfred Webb, a Quaker MP, assumed the question of whether the drug should be prohibited at all was already settled. He intended the Royal Commission to examine how best the losses of the end of the opium trade could be managed by the Government of India.

However, Gladstone shifted the focus of the Royal Commission with an amendment to remove the assertion that the need to abolish the trade had been already established in 1891 and to shift the focus of the Commission to consumption within India.

The final terms of reference given to the Commission by Parliament was:

Resolved, That having strong objections urged on moral grounds to the system by which the Indian opium revenue is raised, this House presses on the Government of India to continue their policy of greatly diminishing the cultivation of the poppy and the production and sale of opium, and desires that an humble Address be presented to Her Majesty, praying Her Majesty to appoint a Royal Commission to report as to— 1. Whether the growth of the poppy and manufacture and sale of opium in British India should be prohibited except for medical purposes, and whether such prohibition could be extended to the Native States. 2. The nature of the existing arrangements with the Native States in respect of the transit of opium through British territory, and on what terms, if any, these arrangements could be with justice terminated. 3. The effect on the finances of India of the prohibition of the sale and export of opium, taking into consideration (a) the amount of compensation payable; (b) the cost of the necessary preventive measures; (c) the loss of revenue. 4. Whether any change short of total prohibition should be made in the system at present followed for regulating and restricting the opium traffic and for raising a revenue therefrom. 5. The consumption of opium by the different races and in the different districts of India, and the effect of such consumption on the moral and physical condition of the people. 6. The disposition of the people of India in regard to (a) the use of opium for non-medical purposes; (b) their willingness to bear in whole or in part the cost of prohibitive measures.

After an extended inquiry the Royal Commission released its report, running to around two thousand pages, in early 1895. The report firmly rejected the claims made by the anti-opiumists in regard to the harm wrought to India by this traffic. Instead, it claimed that opium use in Asia was analogous to alcohol use in Europe, that opium was not harmful to Asians, and that Chinese complaints were based on commercial concerns, not medical evidence. This proved to be an unexpected and devastating blow to the hopes of the anti-opium reformers in Britain. The Commission's conclusions effectively removed the opium question from the British public agenda for another 15 years. One member of the Commission, Henry J. Wilson, published a Minute of Dissent.

== Membership ==
Queen Victoria appointed nine members to the Royal Commission on Opium. These consisted of seven British and two Indian members headed by Thomas Brassey, 1st Earl Brassey, who served as chairman. Those appointed were accomplished, prominent public men who had to have sufficient resources to serve without pay on the commission for a considerable period of time. All those appointed were experienced at sifting through complex issues and coming to reasonable conclusions based on evidence presented to them. The Society for the Suppression of the Opium Trade commented in its journal that after attending the early hearing in London, "the commission is as fair-minded and impartial a tribunal as could have desired to hear our case."

Chairman:

- Thomas Brassey, 1st Earl Brassey, (1836–1918) was the son of Thomas Brassey, the railway contractor of Cheshire. Brassey had an extended career as a Liberal Member of the Parliament. He was a prolific author best known for his Brassey's Naval Annual, a survey of naval affairs around the world. John Wodehouse, 1st Earl of Kimberley, Secretary of State for India, summarized the prevailing view of Brassey in a letter to the Marquess of Lansdowne, Viceroy of India: "I hope that you will have been satisfied with our nomination of Brassey to the Chairmanship of the Opium Commission. He is perhaps not a very strong man, but he is hard working, well informed, and fair minded. We may rely on his impartiality which is the most important qualification in such an inquiry." His son, an aspiring but never successful parliamentary candidate, was an assistant secretary to the commission.

Two members actively associated with the government of India were firmly pro-opium:

- Sir Arthur Fanshawe (1848–1931), Director-General of the India Post Office, who had earlier experience with the excise revenues in the Indian Civil Service.
- Sir James Broadwood Lyall (1838–1916) had retired to Britain in 1892 after a distinguished Indian career that culminated in his appointment as Lieutenant Governor of the Punjab.

The two avowedly anti-opium British members included:

- Henry Joseph Wilson (1833–1914), an aggressive, radical Liberal MP from Holmfirth in West Yorkshire since 1885. He was a stubborn and tireless campaigner for social reform and religious freedom.
- Arthur Pease (1837–1898) was a Member of Parliament from Whitby who served on the governing council of the Society for the Suppression of the Opium trade. Pease was a conscientious Quaker, and strong Liberal Unionist, 'a high principled, self-satisfied, and rather pompous sort of gentleman'.

The two Indian members were:

- Lakshmeshwar Singh (1858–1898), Maharaja of Darbhanga, a committed Indian nationalist who was one of the most generous financial supporters of Indian National Congress from its inception in 1885. He was also the elected non-official member of the Supreme Legislative Council that advised the Viceroy of India.
- Haridas Viharidas Desai (1840–1895), Diwan of Junagadh. The Viceroy nominated him on advice of Sir Charles Pritchard, a member of his Council who had served in the Bombay Presidency.

The remaining positions were filled by:

- Sir Robert Gray Cornish Mowbray, 2nd Baronet (1850–1916), a conservative MP from Prestwich and an Inner Temple Barrister by profession was uncommitted to a position on the issue.
- Sir William Roberts (1830–1899), a notable physician, clinician and medical researcher.

== Reception ==
The Commission's finding in favour of the existing opium regime in British India was met with surprise and dismay among British anti-opium activists. Joseph Pease and John Ellis denounced the Commission's final report to Parliament in 1895 as being the product of "misleading circulars, prescribed questions, suggestions in a particular direction, examination and filtration of evidence, and withholding of certain witnesses" in an "inversion of the ordinary rule to which we were accustomed in this country when it was desired to elicit the truth." Outside of Parliament, the British anti-opium movement was broadly sceptical of the Commission's objectivity, claiming that the limited terms of reference given to the Commissioners by Parliament and interference by the Raj's officials meant that the report was fatally biased. This critique has been echoed by some later historians, who agreed that the Commissioners were subject to undue interference as they investigated the opium question in India.

Defenders of the status quo rallied in support of the Commission, with the Secretary of State for India, Henry Fowler, praising the report for its fairness in defending the everyday habits of Indians in the House of Commons. The medical journal The Lancet also responded positively to the report, asserting that it had dealt a "crushing blow to the anti-opium faddists."

Indian political elites generally welcomed the report as defence against the financial losses and social instability that they feared a total ban on non-medical opium sales would bring to India. Public opinion among nationalists had long been mixed on the opium question with national finances and humanitarianism competing but generally supported the Raj against British reformers in the wake of the Royal Commission's report. Even Dadabhai Naoroji, who was generally an opponent of the opium trade and often an ally of the same British radicals who sought to ban opium, argued during the parliamentary debate in 1893 that began the Commission that investigating opium sales in India was a distraction from other more pressing issues.

== See also ==
- British Empire
- Opium Trading in Mumbai
- Royal Commission
