= Frederick Storrs Turner =

Rev. Frederick Storrs Turner (31 May 1834 – 26 May 1916) was a British clergyman and campaigner against the opium trade.

== Biography ==
Frederick Storrs Turner was born in Stepney, London, the son of clerk Benjamin Bockett Turner of Bow, London and Elizabeth Maria Storrs of Edinburgh. He was baptised at the Bull Lane Independent Church, a nonconformist church in Stepney. He received his B.A. from the University of London in 1855.

He was a member of the London Missionary Society. Although he was a nonconformist, he was not a Quaker like many other anti-opium activists, and as part of his missionary work spent some years living in China with his family. He was the father of paediatrician Alfred Jefferis Turner.

After winning an essay-writing competition in 1874, Turner helped to found the Society for the Suppression of the Opium Trade (SSOT), and became the Society's secretary. He also edited and published the regular SSOT newsletter, Friends of China.

Turner also published a number of other essays and monographs opposing the opium trade, including British opium policy and its results to India and China, Reply to the Defence of the Opium Trade by the Shanghai Correspondent of the Times, as well as works on Christianity (such as The Quakers: A Study, Historical and Critical... and The Certainty of Religion).

Frederick Storrs Turner died in Hitchin, Hertfordshire, aged 81.
