= Society for the Suppression of the Opium Trade =

The Anglo-Oriental Society for the Suppression of the Opium Trade
- Formation: 1874
- Dissolved: 1917

The Anglo-Oriental Society for the Suppression of the Opium Trade, generally known by the somewhat shorter name of Society for the Suppression of the Opium Trade (SSOT), was a British lobbying group in the late nineteenth and early twentieth centuries, opposed to the opium trade.

== History ==
In 1874 a group of Quaker businessmen offered a £200 prize for the best essay on the British opium trade. The winner, Rev. Frederick Storrs-Turner, announced his intent to set up a society to oppose the trade, and at a meeting in November of that year the Society for the Suppression of the Opium Trade was formed. Rev. Storrs-Turner became the society's secretary, and the funds for its foundation were provided by Quaker and industrialist Edward Pease (1834–1880) (brother of Sir Joseph Pease, who was later to be president of the society). The first president was the Earl of Shaftesbury, although he was not elected to the post until 1880. Early in its history, it was able to publicise the enrollment of Donald Matheson, who had left his family's firm Jardine, Matheson & Co. due to the company's involvement in the opium trade.

The society quickly became a focal point for the anti-opium movement. Initially, it campaigned on two fronts: lobbying for the British Government to cease its military and diplomatic pressures on China to allow opium imports and removing direct government involvement in the trade in India. After the Chefoo Convention of 1876, when the British Government ceased to pressurise China into allowing opium imports, the Society turned its attention to the Indian production of opium, advocating total prohibition in India except for medical use.

The Society commanded considerable support in China, partly as a result of its connections to Quaker missions and partly due to the diplomatic efforts of the Society's secretary, Joseph Gundry Alexander (1848-1918), who travelled to China in 1894 and met with many government representatives there to discuss the opium issue. As a result of his report, the Society adopted the view that Chinese condemnation of the opium trade was widespread, a belief at odds with that of the British public. Like many similar organisations, the Society was composed largely of upper- and middle-class politicians, landowners and clergy, and its aims were largely irrelevant to the majority of the British working population. Because of its large Quaker membership, the Society often had a religious tone to its meetings, with prayers and discussion of Biblical content being common. Other Christian organisations, such as the Church of England, were also active in the anti-opium movement. Whilst there were agnostic crusaders against the trade, such as John Morley, this religious sentiment was seized upon by the pro-opium movement, who dismissed the Society's message as histrionic "hellfire and brimstone" preaching.

In his capacity as the Society's president, Sir Joseph Pease attempted to pass a motion in the House of Commons in 1891 to declare the opium trade "morally indefensible" and remove Government support for it. The motion failed to pass (despite majority support in the House) due to an amendment calling for compensation to India, but it brought the anti-opium campaign into the public eye and increased opposition to the trade. The Society's campaigning resulted in the creation of a Royal Commission on Opium, but although a member of the Society (Arthur Pease) was on the Commission, its findings were firmly in favour of the trade. As a result, the aims of the anti-opium movement were set back considerably; it was fifteen years before the issue was again debated in Parliament.

In 1906, the motion proposed by Pease in 1891 was once again put before Parliament. This time it was successful, and in response the Chinese passed laws prohibiting the manufacture of opium. The Society disbanded in 1917, having achieved its goals when the British finally ended the opium trade between India and China in 1913.

== Publications ==
The society published a regular newspaper, The Friend of China, which appeared, on average, eight times each year and was circulated both in the United Kingdom and among missionary communities in China. Rev. Storrs-Turner was the editor. It also published books condemning the opium trade, such as Joshua Rowntree's The Imperial Drug Trade and Benjamin Broomhall The Truth About Opium Smoking.

== Notable members ==
- Edward Pease (1834–1880) (founder)
- Sir Joseph Pease, 1st Baronet (1828–1903) (industrialist and Liberal M.P.) – President 1886–1903
- Anthony Ashley-Cooper, 7th Earl of Shaftesbury (1801–1885) – President 1880–1885
- Thomas Hughes
- Donald Matheson (of Jardine, Matheson & Co.)
- Rev. Frederick Storrs-Turner
- James Legge
- Arthur Pease (MP)
- Sir Wilfrid Lawson
- Alfred Stace Dyer

== Works ==
- Muir, William (1875). The opium revenue . Westminster: The Anglo-Oriental Society for the Suppression of the Opium Trade.
