= Drug Equality Alliance =

British non-profit

The Drug Equality Alliance is a non-profit organisation based in the United Kingdom whose mission statement is:

[...] It is made to transform the "War on Some People who use Some Drugs" from its subjective historical and cultural roots into a rational and objective legal regulatory framework that secures equal rights and equal protection to all those who are concerned with dangerous or otherwise harmful drugs. Our mission is to use domestic and international legal jurisdictions to interrogate the law and its application to those who produce, commerce, possess and consume such drugs.

== Stances ==
The Drug Equality Alliance believes that the UK Government is administering the Misuse of Drugs Act 1971 in an arbitrary and discriminatory manner. This is contrary to the purpose of the Act, contrary to the original wishes of Parliament, conflicts with the European Convention on Human Rights, and is therefore illegal. It argues that the penalties associated with the possession, production and supply of various controlled substances are not proportional to the relative harms which these substances cause to individuals and society, especially since two of the most dangerous drugs, alcohol and tobacco, are presently excluded from the Act. The Drug Equality Alliance is currently assisting and supporting several legal challenges in relation to this alleged maladministration.

As evidence that the Misuse of Drugs Act 1971 is being administered arbitrarily, the Drug Equality Alliance cites the following admission made by the Government in "The Government Reply to the Fifth Report from the House of Commons Science and Technology Committee Session 2005-6 HC 1031: Drug classification: making a hash of it?" (Cm 6941):

...the Government acknowledges that alcohol and tobacco account for more health problems and deaths than illicit drugs.... The distinction between legal and illegal substances is not unequivocally based on pharmacology, economic or risk benefit analysis. It is also based in large part on historical and cultural precedents.

In March 2010, in response to a Freedom of Information request process submitted by Casey William Hardison, acting with the Drug Equality Alliance, the Information Commissioner's Office ordered the Home Office to disclose a suppressed draft consultation paper with suggestions for a review of the drug classification system. This decision was subject to a last minute appeal by the Home Office, but the appeal was withdrawn on 9 July 2010 and the consultation paper was released on 12 July 2010.

The web address and website of the organisation originated in 2008. The respective web address was last recorded as directing to the organisation's official website up until 6 July 2022. Since 17 October 2022, it has been recorded as either inaccessible or redirecting to other unrelated content to the organisation (such as a gambling website).

== See also ==
- Misuse of Drugs Act 1971
- War on drugs
- Drug policy reform
- Prohibition (drugs)
- Release (agency)
