= William Arthur Smith Benson =

English designer

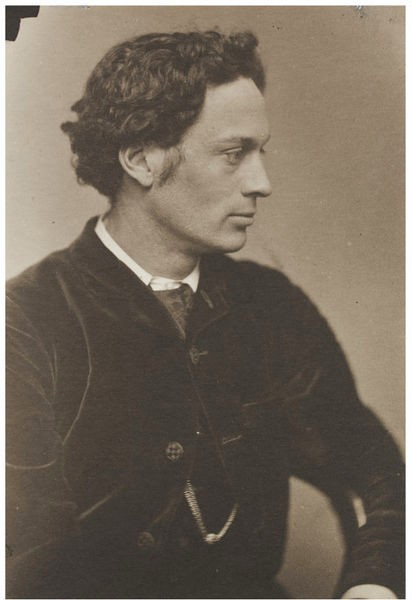
- W.A.S. Benson by Frederick Hollyer, c. 1900.
- Born: 17 October 1854
- Died: 5 July 1924 (aged 69)
- Occupation: Designer
- Spouse(s): Venetia Benson, née Hunt
- Relatives: Alfred William Hunt (father-in-law); Margaret Raine Hunt (mother-in-law); Violet Hunt (sister-in-law); George Heywood Maoinoir Sumner (brother-in-law)

William Arthur Smith Benson (also known as W.A.S. Benson) (17 October 1854 – 5 July 1924) was a British designer active in the Arts and Crafts Movement and an early exponent of electrical lighting design. He is regarded as the greatest British arts and craft lighting designer. Benson was a founding member of the Art Workers' Guild in 1884, and the Design and Industries Association in 1915.

== Early life ==
Benson was born on 17 October 1854 at 6 Sussex Square, Paddington, and was educated at Winchester College, before attending New College, Oxford between 1874 and 1877 studying classics and philosophy. As a child he had been taught how to practice metal work on a lathe, but upon leaving Oxford, he was articled to the London architect Basil Champneys. While working for Champney, he met Edward Burne-Jones at a rehearsal of Wagner, and was used by Burnes-Jones as his model for the King in King Cophetua and the Beggar Queen. Burnes-Jones would introduce Benson to William Morris. While completing his architectural studies, he started designing furniture for Morris.

== W. A. S. Benson & Co ==
By 1880 he had opened a small workshop in North End Road, Fulham making furniture for Morris & Co. A year later the company employed John Lovegrove, a skilled brass and copper-worker, and Benson moved into the design of metal work including fire screens and fenders, tableware, kettles, urns and light fittings. The success of the company saw them move to a new factory at Eyot Works, St Peter's Square, Hammersmith, a foundry in Chiswick and opening a showroom at Camden Hill Square in Kensington during 1883.

The company would move their showroom to 82 Bond Street, London in 1887, and in their 1899-1900 catalogue the business offered over 800 items that could be ordered. The business also offered commissioned designs, including equipping solicitor J.S. Beal house called Standen with electric lighting, one of the first houses to be fully electrified in Britain. A big commission for Benson was the design and installation of the electric lighting at St. Paul's Cathedral between 1899 and 1900, while he provided the lighting for Siegfried Bing at the Maison de l'Art Nouveau in 1895. Benson would continue to design and manufacture furniture for both Morris & Co and J.S. Henry & Co, and upon William Morris death in 1896 he was appointed as the director for furniture at Morris & Co. Benson would also collaborate with John Henry Dearle on the company's wallpaper designs. W.A.S. Benson & Company became a registered limited company in 1900, with Benson as chairman and Henry Currier Marillier as company secretary. In 1906, the managers of Morris & Co, Frank and Robert Smith approached Benson and Marillier about purchasing the Morris company, which they did and ran both companies jointly until 1908, when Benson concentrated on his own business and Marillier on Morris & Co after personal conflict. During World War I the company switched production to shells for the Ministry of Munitions, and equipment for the launching of torpedoes for the Admiralty. In 1920, Benson sold the business and retired to Castle Corner, a house in Manorbier, Wales with his wife Venetia and died four years later on 5 July.

== Architecture ==
Benson would continue to operate an architectural practice while designing for and managing W.A.S. Benson & Co, though most of the work was for himself or his friends.

His works include:

- 1887 Cricket pavilion, Winchester College, Hampshire
- 1888 The Hill House, Grand Hill, Chalfont St. Beter, Buckinghamshire, for George Heywood Maoinoir Sumner and Mrs Agnes Mary Sumner
- 1889 The Eyot Metal Works, Eyot Gardens, Hugbendon Road, Hammersmith, London for W. A. S. Benson & Co.
- 1901 Pavilion to display products made by W. A. S. Benson & Co., at the Glasgow Exhibition of 1901
- 1904 Bedburn Hall and cottage and outbuildings on estate, Hamsterley, Wolsingham, Co. Durham, for John Walton Fogg-Elliott
- 1906 The White Cottage, German Street, Winchelsea, East Sussex, for Miss Beatrice and Miss Maud Bennington
- 1906 Parish Hall, Manobier, Pembrokeshire, Wales
- 1907 Minterne House, Minterne Magna, Dorchester, Dorset, for Lord Edward Henry Trafalgar Digby
- 1907 Ballader's Plat, German Street, Winchesea, East Sussex, for Miss Maud Beddington

== Inventor ==
During Benson's life, he patented 35 inventions and registered over 150 designs. His designs include the paper cup, oven to table ware, the Benson patent switch, cast iron ornamental windows and Texyl, a corrugated reinforced iron sheets that would be embedded into concrete as an early form of prefabricated construction panels.

== Bibliography ==
Benson frequently did lectures and wrote about design and electrical work. His writings include:

- Notes on the Minor Notes, 1883
- The embossing of metals'. The English Illustrated Magazine vol. 7, 1888-89 pp. 39–46
- The use of the lathe'. The English Illustrated Magazine vol. 9, 1891-92 pp. 121–126
- Notes on Electric Wiring and Fittings, 1897
- 'William Morris and the Arts and Crafts'. The National Review vol. 34, 1899-1900 pp. 268–271
- The early machine tools of Henry Maudslay'. Engineering vol. 71, January–June 1901 pp. 65, 66, 68, 80, 134-136
- Back-windows Prospects in London'. The Art Journal 1903 pp. 1–4
- 'Agamemnon'. The Cornhill Magazine vol. 46, 1919 pp. 534–546

== Influences ==
Benson was one of the eleven founding members of the Art Workers' Guild in 1884. He was influential in the creation of the Home Arts and Industries Association, while Arthur Heygate Mackmurdo credits Benson with the idea for the Arts and Crafts Exhibition Society in 1888. During 1915, Benson was a founding member of the Design and Industries Association. Benson was also a supporting member of the Society for the Protection of Ancient Buildings, and assisted with the reorganisation of the Victoria & Albert Museum.

== Designs ==
Benson designs have been included in the collections of museums around the world including The Art Institute of Chicago and the V&A. In 1900, German critic, Hermann Muthesius in his publication Das Englische Haus, a study of avant garde lighting devoted pages to Benson's designs. Muthesius wrote Benson was the first to develop his designs directly out of the purpose and character of the metal as material... he was the leading spirit in electrical appliances in England.

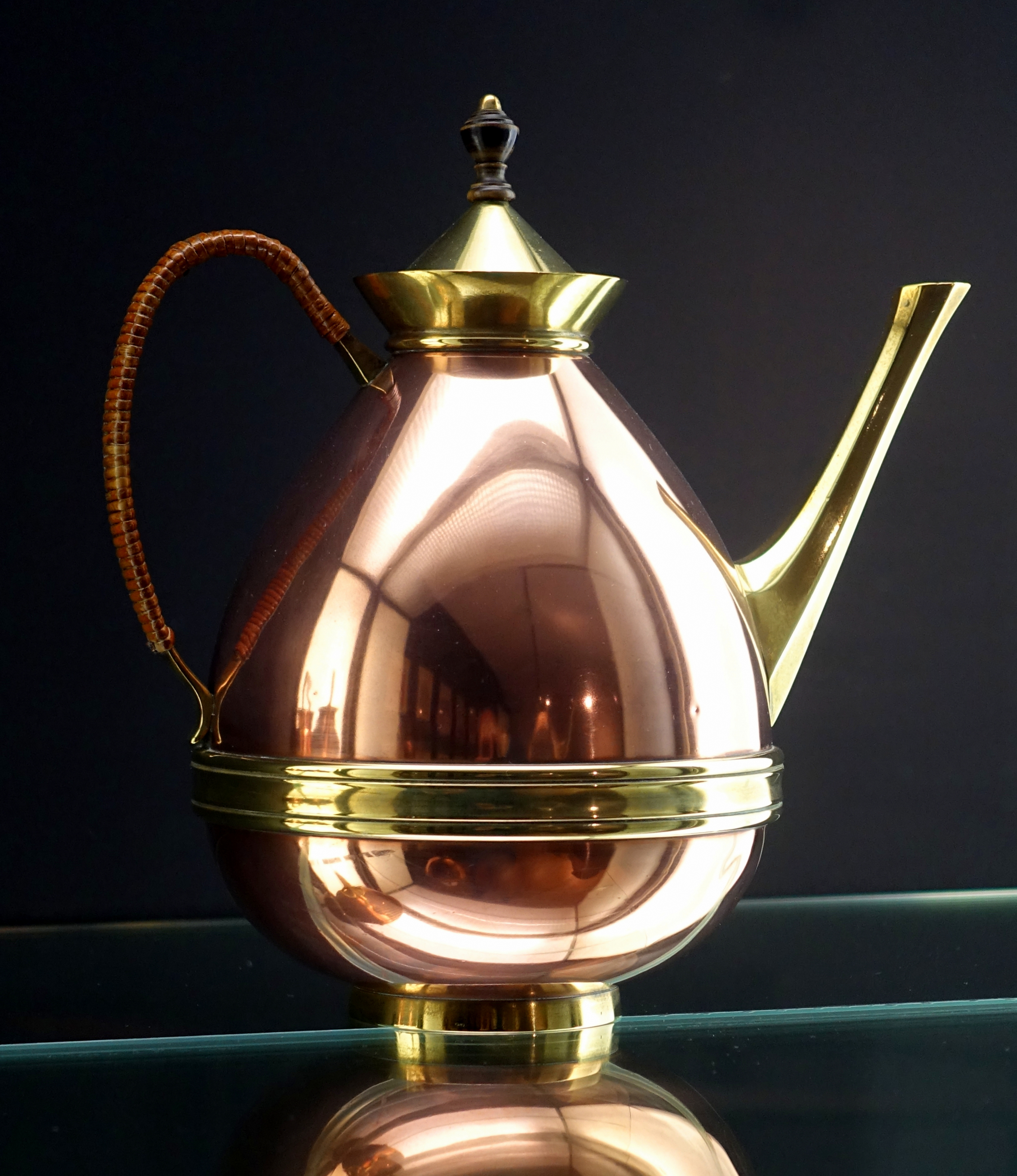
Coffee pot, designed by William Arthur Smith Benson, before 1900

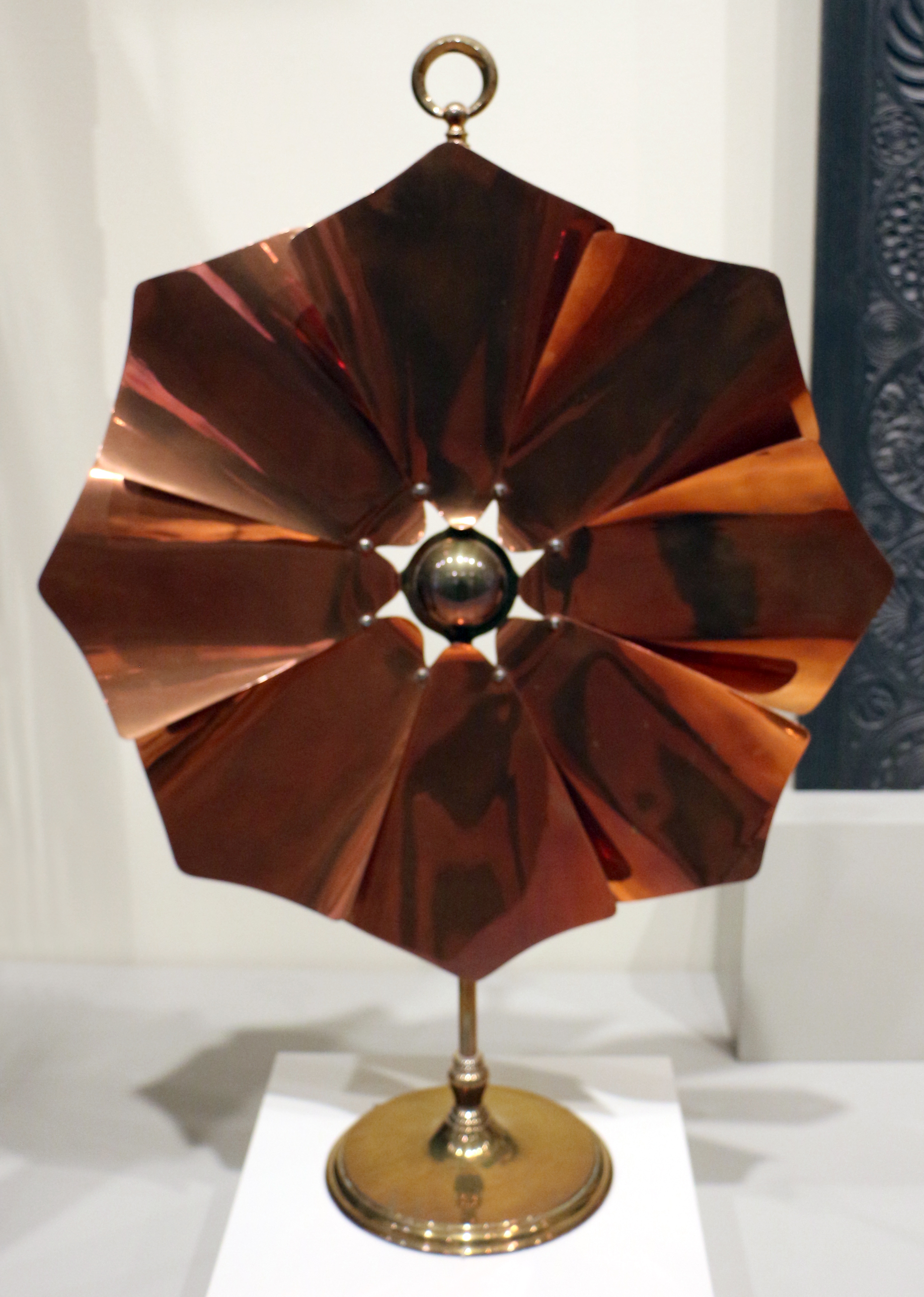
Fire Screen, 1900. Art Institute of Chicago

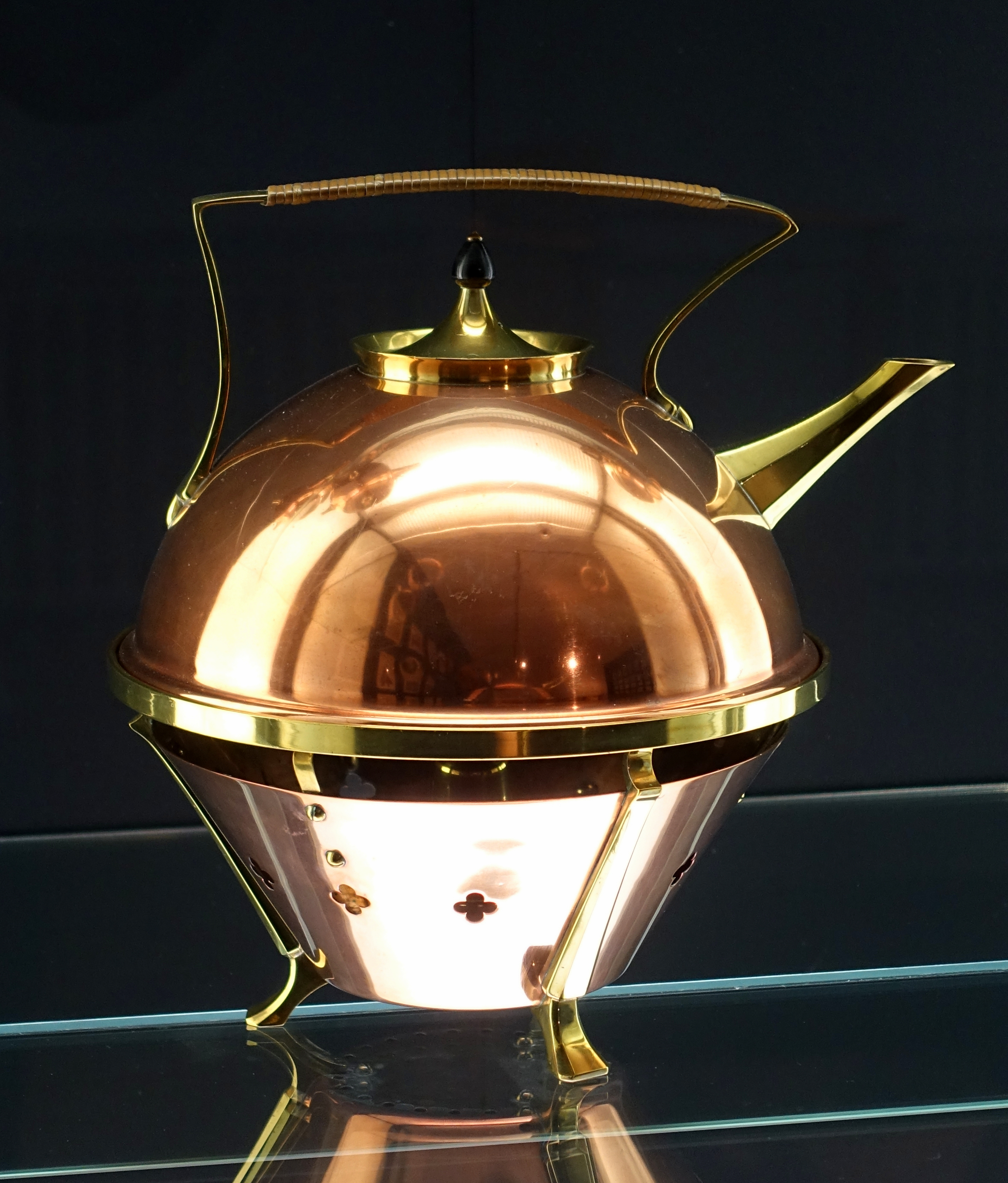
Kettle with heater, designed by William Arthur Smith Benson, made by W.A.S. Benson & Co., London, c. 1885, at Bröhan Museum, Berlin

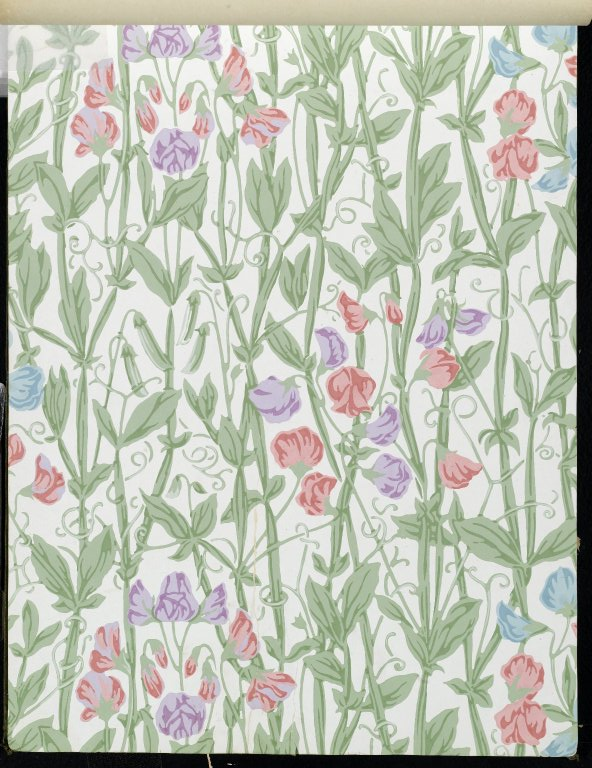
Sweetpea pattern wallpaper designed by Benson for Morris & Co, at the Brooklyn Museum
