= Folkard =

Folkard is a surname. Notable people with the surname include:

- Bert Folkard (1878–1937), Australian cricketer
- Charles Folkard (1878–1963), English illustrator
- Julia Bracewell Folkard (1849–1933), British painter
- Mark Folkard (born 1965), Australian politician
- Naomi Folkard (born 1983), English archer
