= Mary Anne Keeley =

English actress and actor-manager

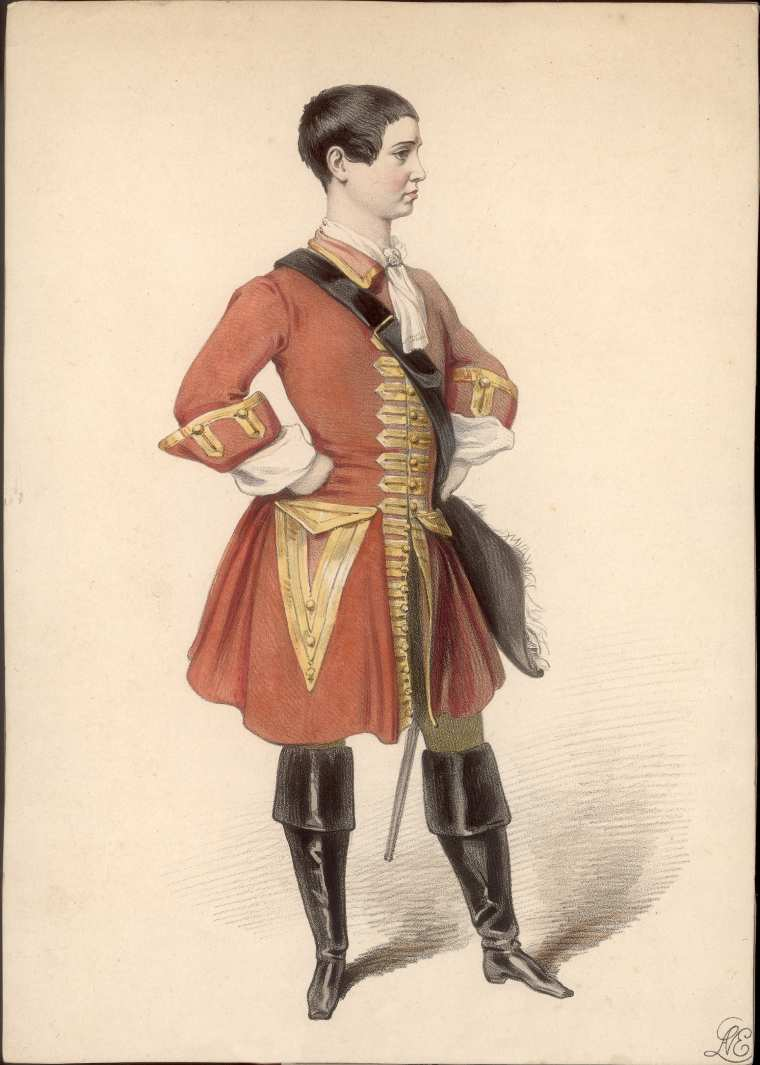
Mary Anne Keeley in a breeches role

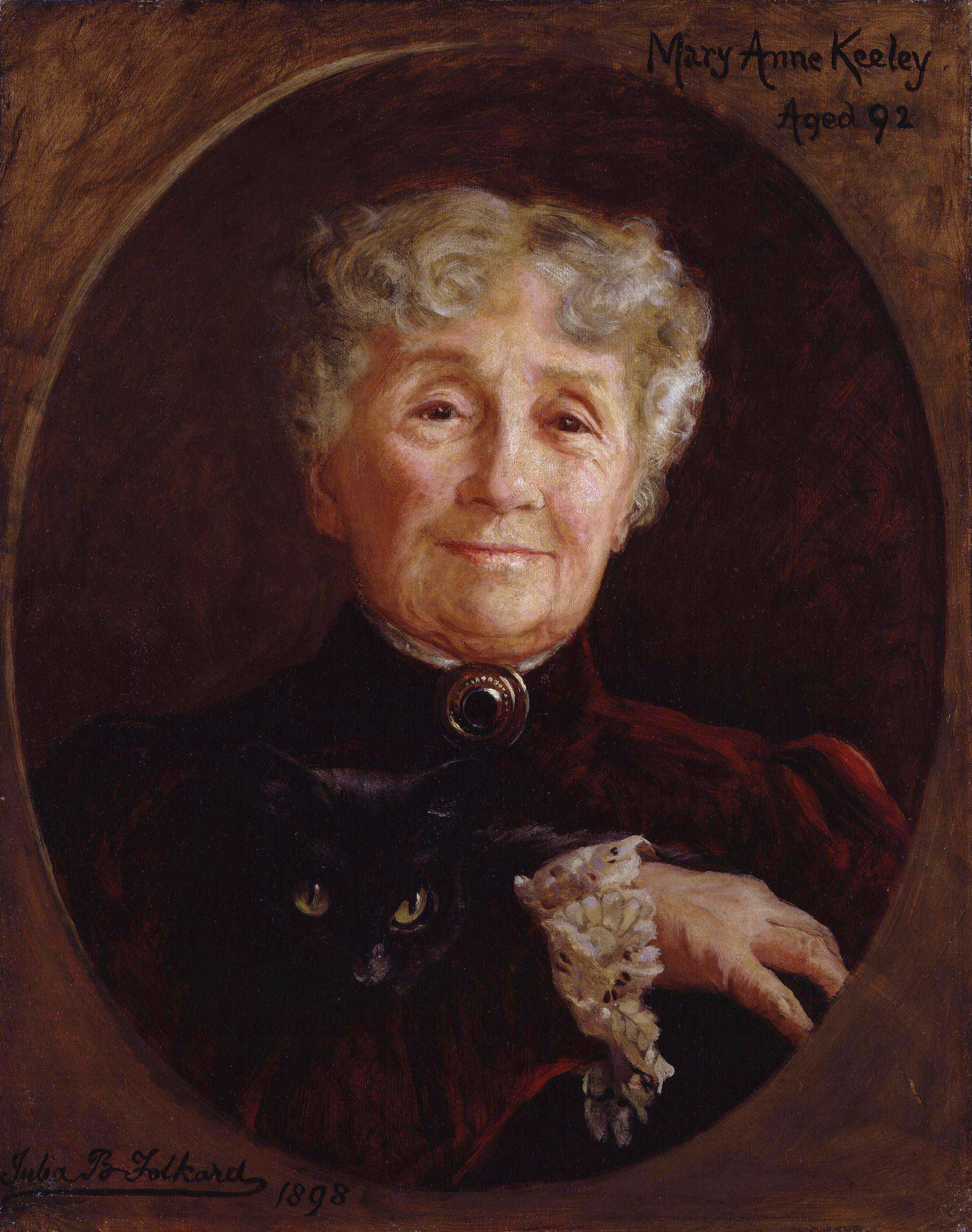
Mary Anne Keeley by Julia Bracewell Folkard at age 92 in 1898

Mary Anne Keeley, née Goward (22 November 1805 – 12 March 1899) was an English actress and actor-manager.

== Life ==
Mary Ann Goward was born at Ipswich, her father was a brazier and tinman. Her sister Sarah Judith Goward was the mother of Lydia Foote.

Goward's singing talents were noticed by the Ipswich writer Elizabeth Cobbold and she encouraged her to take to the stage. After some experience in the provinces, she first appeared on the stage in London on 2 July 1825 in the opera Rosina. It was not long before she gave up singing parts in favour of drama proper, where her powers of character-acting could have scope.

In June 1829 she married Robert Keeley (1793-1869), an admirable comedian, with whom she had often appeared. Between 1832 and 1842 they acted at Covent Garden, at the Adelphi with John Buckstone, at the Olympic with Charles Mathews, and at Theatre Royal, Drury Lane with William Charles Macready. In 1836 they visited America. In 1838 she made her first great success as Nydia, the blind girl, in a dramatized version of Bulwer-Lytton's The Last Days of Pompeii, and followed this with an equally striking impersonation of Smike in Nicholas Nickleby.

In 1839 came her decisive triumph with her picturesque and spirited acting as the hero of a play founded upon Harrison Ainsworth's Jack Sheppard. So dangerous was considered the popularity of the play, with its glorification of the prison-breaking felon, that the Lord Chamberlain ultimately forbade the performance of any piece upon the subject. It is perhaps mainly as Jack Sheppard that Keeley lived in the memory of playgoers, despite her long subsequent career in plays more worthy of her remarkable gifts.

Under Macready's management she played Nerissa in The Merchant of Venice, and Audrey in As You Like It. She managed the Lyceum Theatre with her husband from 1844 to 1847; acted with Benjamin Webster and Charles Kean at the Haymarket; returned for five years to the Adelphi; and made her last regular public appearance at the Lyceum in 1859.

A public reception, organised by the artist Walter Goodman, was held for her at this theatre on her 90th birthday. To mark this birthday, Keeley addressed a message to fellow-actresses by way of a letter to The Gentlewoman, which was reported in the Court Circular column in The Times:

My 90th birthday message to my sisters of the stage: I send you all my love, and say God bless you; and may you live as long as I have, and be just as happy! MARY ANNE KEELEY Nov. 22, 1895.

Keeley died in 1899 and is buried in Brompton Cemetery, London.

Mary Anne and Robert Keeley had two daughters, Mary Lucy (circa 1830-1870) and Louise (1835-1877), both of whom followed their parents on to the stage. Mary Lucy married the writer Albert Richard Smith, while Louise married the criminal advocate Montagu Williams, later Queen's Counsel.

== See also ==
See Walter Goodman, The Keeleys On Stage and At Home, London: Bentley and Son 1895.
