= Alfred William Hunt =

British painter

Alfred William Hunt RWS
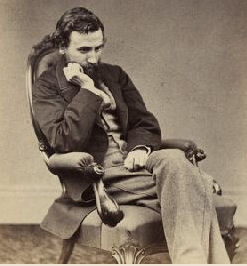
- Alfred William Hunt
- Born: 15 November 1830; Liverpool, Lancashire, England
- Died: 3 May 1896 (aged 65); Kensington, London, England
- Resting place: Brookwood Cemetery
- Occupation: Landscape painter
- Spouse: Margaret Raine Hunt
- Children: Violet Hunt (1862–1942), Venetia Benson (1864–1946), Sylvia Fogg-Elliot (1865–1920)
- Father: Andrew Hunt
- Relatives: Jessie MacGregor (niece)

Alfred William Hunt RWS (15 November 1830 – 3 May 1896), was a British painter. He was son of the landscapist Andrew Hunt.

== Biography ==
Hunt was born in Liverpool in 1830. He began to paint while at the Liverpool Collegiate School. However at his father's suggestion he went in 1848 to Corpus Christi College, Oxford to study classics. His career there was distinguished; he won the Newdigate Prize in 1851 for his poem Nineveh, and became a Fellow of Corpus in 1853.

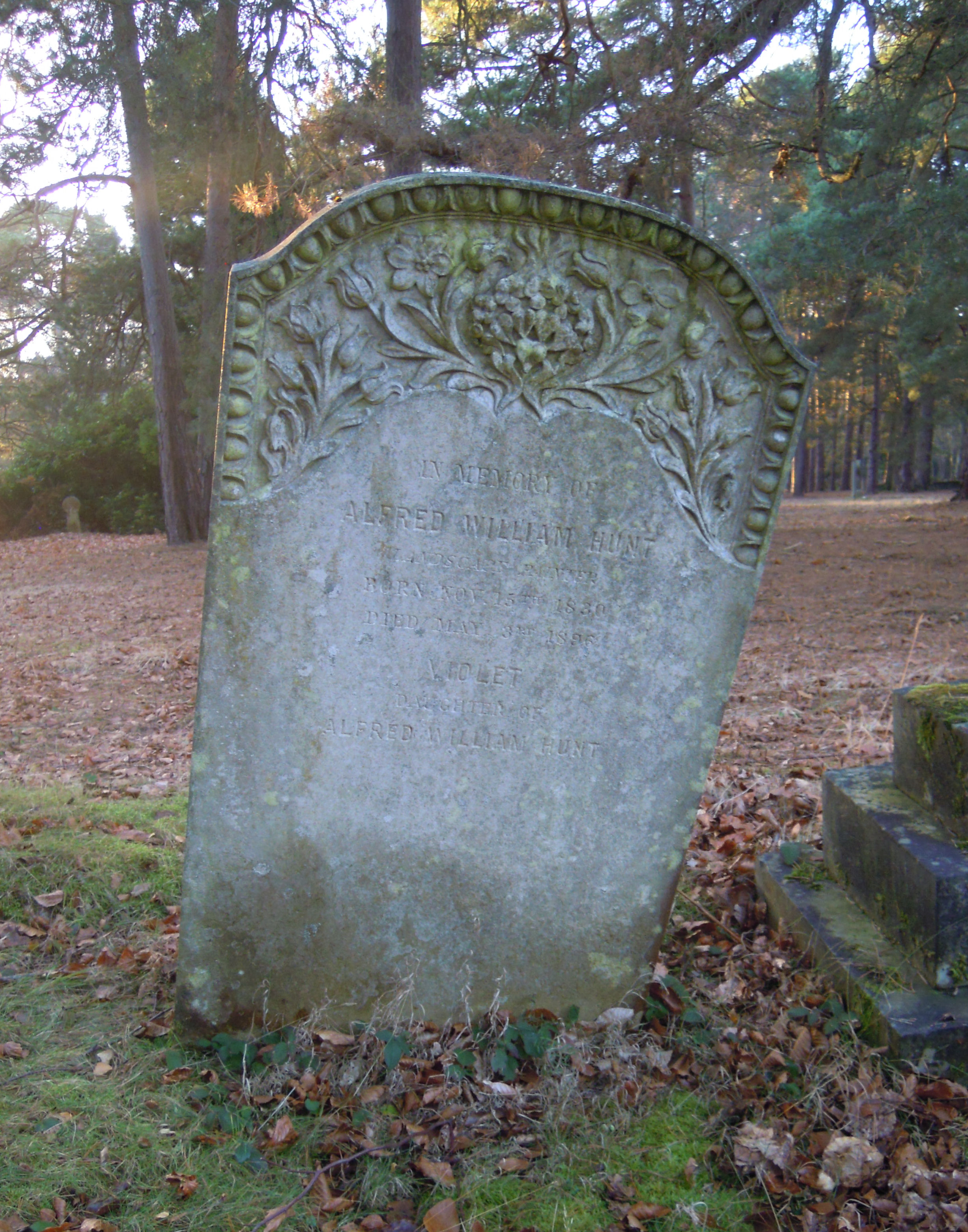
Hunt's grave in Brookwood Cemetery

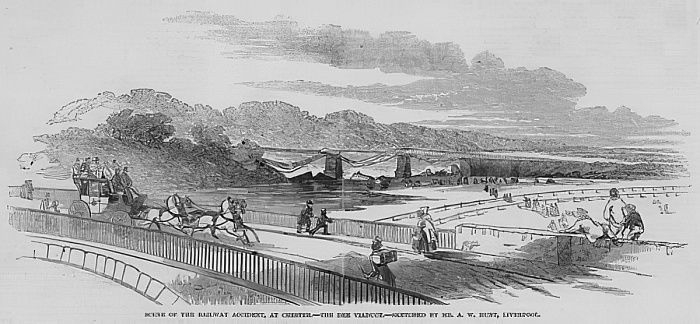
Scene of the Railway Accident, at Chester, the Dee Viaduct, Hunt's first published work

Hunt throughout his career provided sketches to the Illustrated London News the first such, came about through being a witness of the Dee Bridge train disaster on 24 May 1847. Hunt, aged 16 at the time was in the following train, his sketch of the incident was printed by the newspaper on 29 May 1847.

He did not, however, abandon his artistic practice for, encouraged by Ruskin, he exhibited at the Royal Academy in 1854, and afterwards contributed landscapes in oil and watercolour to London and other regional exhibitions. In 1861 he married, gave up his Fellowship, and in 1862 was elected as an Associate of the Royal Watercolour Society, receiving full membership in 1864. His work is distinguished mainly by its exquisite quality and a poetic rendering of atmosphere. He was associated with the Pre-Raphaelite Brotherhood, and the extraordinary detail apparent in his landscapes and the careful rendering of grass, leaves and trees is a consequence of this.

His wife Margaret Raine Hunt wrote several works of fiction; and one of her daughters, Violet Hunt, was known as a novelist. His niece, Jessie MacGregor has paintings in the Walker Art Gallery in Liverpool. He had three daughters.

He is buried with his wife and daughter at Brookwood Cemetery.

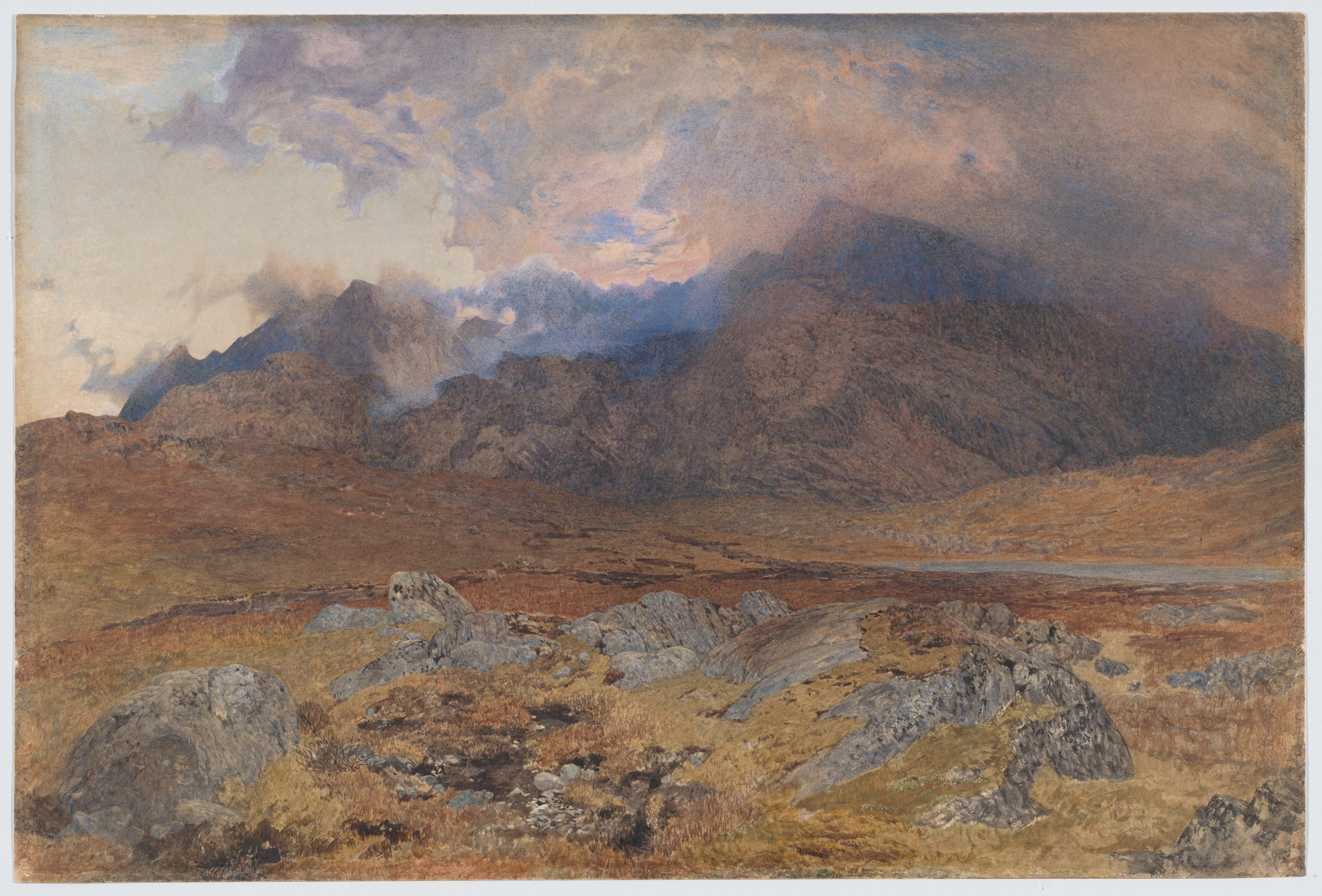
Snowdon, after an April Hailstorm -or Snowdon through Clearing Clouds
