= Estella Canziani =

Artist and writer

Estella Louisa Michaela Canziani (12 January 1887 – 23 August 1964) was a British portrait and landscape painter, an interior decorator and a travel writer and folklorist.

== Life and works ==
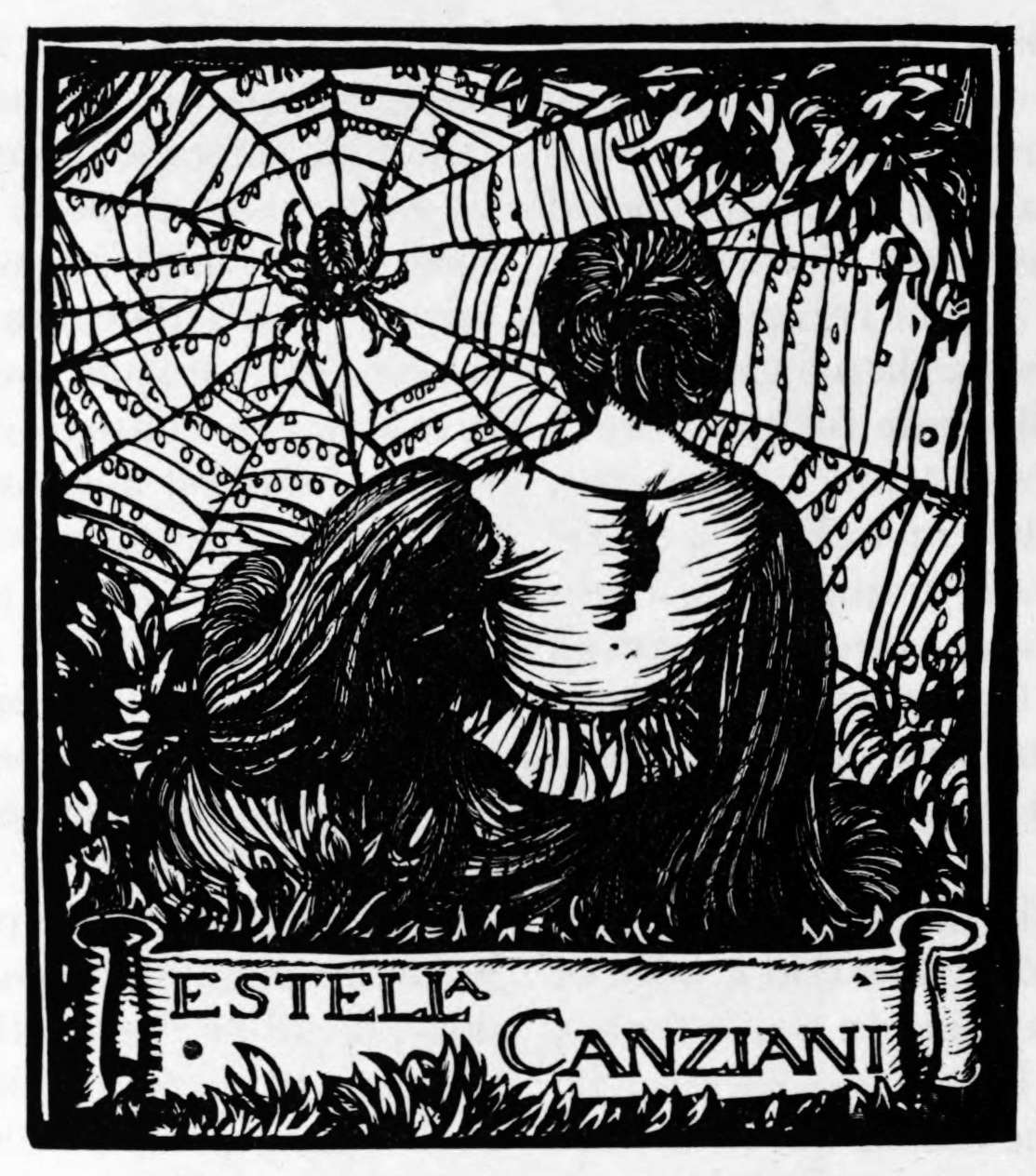
Bookplate of Estella Canziani

Born in London, Estella Canziani was the daughter of the painter Louisa Starr and Enrico Canziani (1848–1931), an Italian civil engineer. She lived all her life in the family home at 3 Palace Green, in the grounds of Kensington Palace.

She trained as an artist, studying first at the 'Copernicus', a Kensington school run by Sir Arthur Cope and Erskine Nicol, then at the Royal Academy schools. She exhibited at the RA London, Liverpool, Milan, Venice and France. Her most famous work was a water colour entitled The Piper of Dreams, exhibited at the Royal Academy in 1915. Reproductions of the work are said to have rivalled Holman Hunt's The Light of the World in popularity.

She travelled extensively throughout Europe, particularly in Italy. Her paintings document the clothes and lifestyle of the local people living in remote villages in Northern Italy. She also worked as a book illustrator.

She published three travel books: Costumes, Traditions and Songs of Savoy (1911), Piedmont (1913) and Through the Apennines and the Lands of the Abruzzi (1928), her writings gaining her membership of the Royal Geographical Society. She published a number of articles in the journal of the Folklore Society. She also published an autobiography: Round About Three Palace Green (1939).

A large part of her collection is preserved in the Birmingham Museum & Art Gallery.

Canziani was a Quaker and member of the Royal Society of British Artists, Arts and Crafts Exhibition Society, Society of Painters in Tempera, Royal Society for the Protection of Birds, Society for the Prevention of Cruelty to Animals, and the Folklore Society.
