= Normanhurst Court =

Former house in England

Coordinates: 50.9096°N 0.4331°E

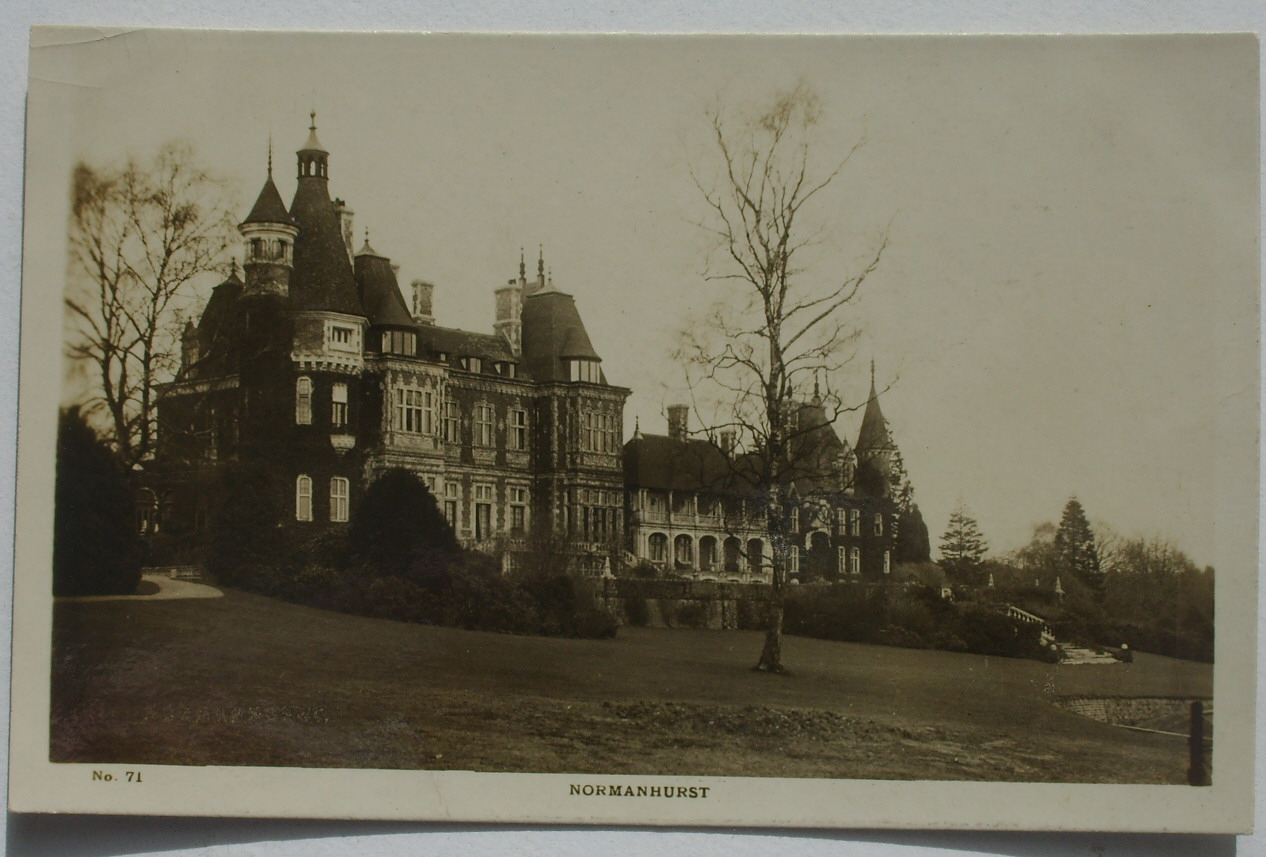

Normanhurst Court was a large manor house in the village of Catsfield in East Sussex.

== History ==
The building of the house was initiated by Thomas Brassey, one of the leading railway builders of the nineteenth century. The works, which were carried out by Lucas Brothers, were completed shortly after he died in 1870 and the house was occupied by Lord Brassey, his son. The house was designed to resemble a French Chateau, and was home of the Brassey family for many years.

The house contained some important portraits by Walter Goodman of Lord Brassey, his wife, Lady Anna Brassey, their children, and Thomas Brassey senior.

It was approached by two entrances each with a lodge. An octagonal water tower rose in the South-West corner of the site. The water tower, a museum and the bachelor's quarters were all situated away from the main building. The estate extended to some 3,400 acres (14 km^{2}) with farmhouses and other buildings.

During World War I it was used as a military hospital for wounded soldiers and, then having been used as a girls' school between the wars, it was used as a Prisoner of war camp during the Second World War. The house was demolished in 1951 and the grounds are now used as a caravan park.
