= Violet Hunt =

English feminist author (1862–1942)

- Hunt, c. 1900
- Born: Isobel Violet Hunt; 28 September 1862; Durham, England
- Died: 16 January 1942 (aged 79); Campden Hill, London, England
- Occupations: Novelist, short story writer
- Parents: Alfred William Hunt (father); Margaret Raine Hunt (mother)
- Relatives: William Arthur Smith Benson (brother-in-law)
- Writing career
- Notable works: The Maiden's Progress; The Human Interest; White Rose of Weary Leaf; Tales of the Uneasy

Isobel Violet Hunt (28 September 1862 – 16 January 1942) was a British author and literary hostess. She wrote feminist novels. She was a member of the Women Writers' Suffrage League. She also participated in the founding of International PEN.

== Biography ==
Hunt was born in Durham. Her father was the artist Alfred William Hunt, her mother the novelist and translator Margaret Raine Hunt. The family moved to London in 1865 and she was brought up in the Pre-Raphaelite group, knowing John Ruskin and William Morris. There is a story that Oscar Wilde, a friend and correspondent, proposed to her in Dublin in 1879; the significance of this event requires her to have been old enough to become engaged, leading to change her birth date to 1862 (not 1866 as often given).

Hunt's writings encompassed short stories, novels, memoir, and biography. She was an active feminist, and her novels The Maiden's Progress and A Hard Woman were works of the New Woman genre, while her short story collection Tales of the Uneasy is an example of supernatural fiction. Her novel White Rose of Weary Leaf is regarded as her best work, while her biography of Elizabeth Siddal is considered unreliable, with animus against Siddal's husband, Dante Gabriel Rossetti. She was active in writers' organisations, founding the Women Writers' Suffrage League in 1908 and participated in the founding of International PEN in 1921.

Despite her considerable literary output, Hunt's reputation rests more with the literary salons she held at her home, South Lodge, in Campden Hill. Among her guests were Rebecca West, Ezra Pound, Joseph Conrad, Wyndham Lewis, D. H. Lawrence, and Henry James. She helped Ford Madox Hueffer (later known as Ford Madox Ford) establish The English Review in 1908. Many of these people were subsequently characterised in her novels, most notably Their Lives and Their Hearts.

Though never married, Hunt carried on multiple relationships, mostly with older men. Among her lovers were Somerset Maugham and H. G. Wells, though her longest affair was with the married Hueffer, who lived with her from about 1910 to 1918 at her home South Lodge (a period including his eight-day 1911 imprisonment for refusal to pay his wife for the support of their two daughters). She was fictionalised by Ford Maddox Ford in two novels: as the scheming Florence Dowell in The Good Soldier and as the promiscuous Sylvia Tietjens in his tetralogy Parade's End. She was also the inspiration for the character Rose Waterfield in Somerset Maugham's novel The Moon and Sixpence and Norah Nesbit in Of Human Bondage. She was the basis for Claire Temple, the central character of Norah Hoult's There Were No Windows (1944).

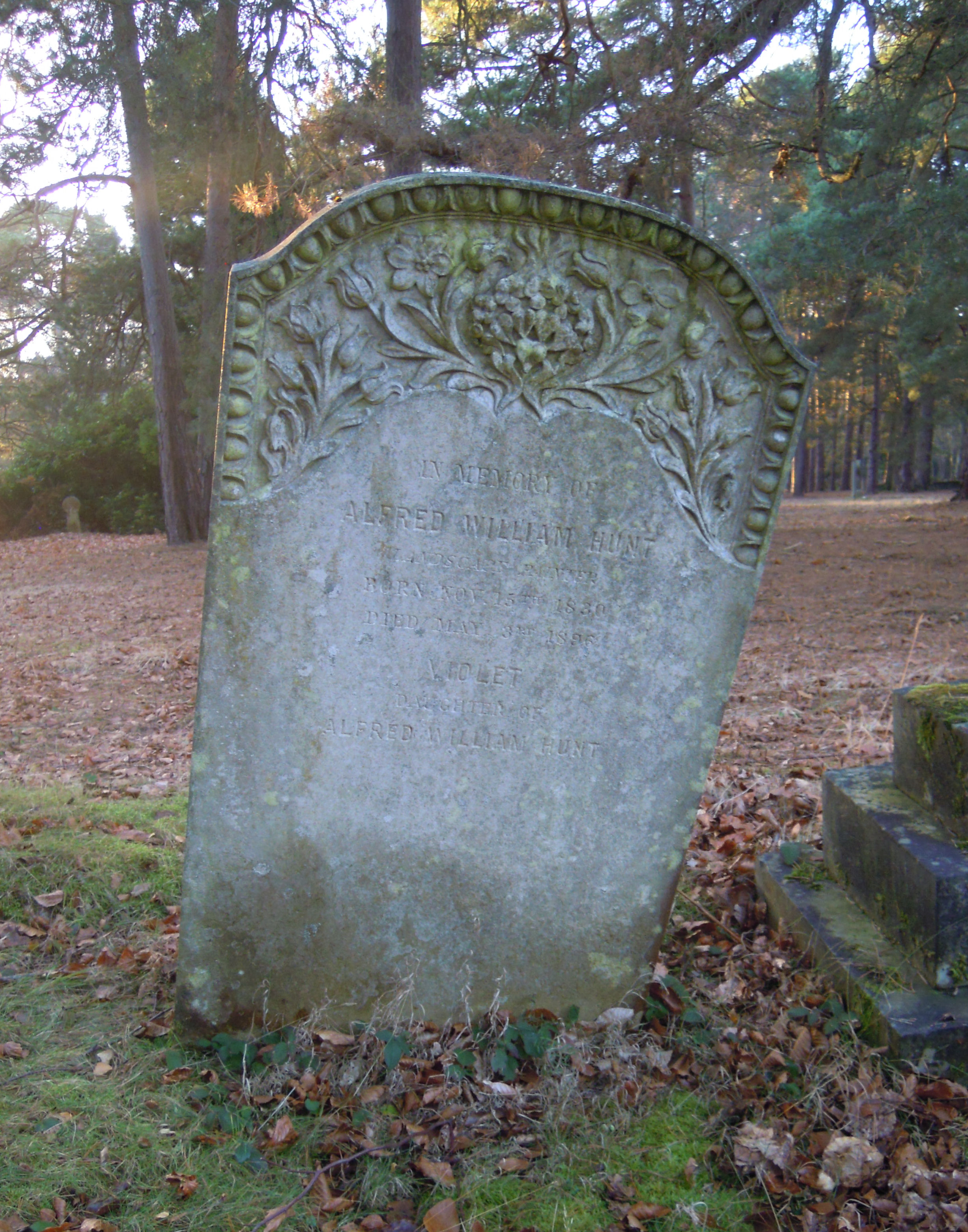
Hunt's grave in Brookwood Cemetery

Hunt wrote two collections of supernatural stories, Tales of the Uneasy and More Tales of the Uneasy. Tales of the Uneasy was described by E. F. Bleiler as containing "Excellent stories, in which the supernatural is used as a technical device to indicate ironies of fate and the intimate relationship of life and death." Tales of the Uneasy was listed by horror historian R. S. Hadji among "unjustly neglected" horror books.

Violet Hunt died of pneumonia in her home in 1942. Her grave and those of her parents is at Brookwood Cemetery.

== Works ==
- The Maiden's Progress (1894)
- A Hard Woman, a Story in Scenes (1895)
- The Way of Marriage (1896)
- Unkist, Unkind! (1897)
- The Human Interest – A Study in Incompatibilities (1899)
- Affairs of the Heart (1900) stories
- The Celebrity at Home (1904)
- Sooner Or Later (1904)
- The Cat (1905)
- The Workaday Woman (1906)
- White Rose Of Weary Leaf (1908)
- The Wife of Altamont (1910)
- The Life Story of a Cat (1910)
- Tales of the Uneasy (1911) stories
- The Doll (1911)
- The Governess (1912) with Margaret Raine Hunt
- The Celebrity's Daughter (1913)
- The Desirable Alien (1913) (with Ford Madox Hueffer)
- The House of Many Mirrors (1915)
- Zeppelin Nights: A London Entertainment (1916) with Ford Madox Hueffer
- Their Lives (1916)
- The Last Ditch (1918)
- Their Hearts (1921)
- Tiger Skin (1924) stories
- More Tales of The Uneasy (1925) stories
- The Flurried Years (1926) autobiography, (U.S., I Have This To Say)
- The Wife of Rossetti - Her Life and Death (1932)
- Return of the Good Soldier: Ford Madox Ford and Violet Hunt's 1917 Diary (1983) (with Ford Madox Ford)
