= Andrew Hunt (painter) =

British artist

- Born: 17 June 1791; Erdington, Birmingham, England
- Died: 22 July 1861 (aged 70); Liverpool, Lancashire, England
- Resting place: Toxteth Park Cemetery; Section C, Grave 403
- Occupations: Landscape Painter and Drawing Teacher. Leading member of the Liverpool Academy and frequent exhibitor.
- Known for: English Landscapes
- Spouse: Sarah Ann Sanderson
- Children: Sophia Hunt (1814–1883); Maria Hunt (1816–1901); Sarah Jane Hunt (1819–1894); Ann Emma Hunt (1822–1906); Matilda Sanderson Hunt (1825–?); Raphael Andrew Hunt (1827–1829); Alfred William Hunt (1830–1896); Amelia Hunt (1833–1921); Amy Hunt (1834–1921)
- Parent: Josiah Hunt Sarah Barnes

Andrew Hunt (1791–1861) was a British landscapist and teacher of drawing.

== Biography ==
Hunt was born on 17 June 1791 at Erdington, near Birmingham, England to Josiah Hunt and Sarah Barnes. He received his first instruction in art from Samuel Lines, the engraver. He had considerable technical ability, and was distinguished even at that early date by his warm admiration for Turner. Being dependent on art for his livelihood, he started a drawing school and "artists repository" on Bold Street in Liverpool, which was well patronized by the great families of the district.

He was a man of generous and amiable disposition, qualities which his more famous son Alfred William Hunt amply inherited from him. Andrew, David Cox (the elder) and his son would go on painting trips where both friends would admire Alfred's precocious talents. He was unwilling to let his son become an artist and arranged for him to join Oxford University where he eventually read classics at Corpus Christi College.

He was elected an associate of the Liverpool Academy in 1843, and a leading member in 1850. His landscapes were painted in oil mostly, and represent views in Cheshire or North Wales, with occasional diversions into Ireland.

He married Sarah Ann Sanderson of London, England on 13 October 1813 at St Bartholomew's Church in Edgbaston, a suburb of Birmingham, England. The couple went to reside at Liverpool where they had a large family, Alfred being his seventh child (and only surviving son), and all were to a greater or less extent practiced in drawing. One daughter, Maria, was well known as a painter of fruit and flower subjects.

The Walker Art Gallery in Liverpool contains these 5 works by Andrew Hunt:

- Sefton Mill and Church (1841)
- Cornfield With Figures
- Wallasey Pool from the Seacombe Shore (1840)
- Sefton Church
- The North Shore: Estuary of the Mersey

Andrew Hunt exhibited regularly at the Liverpool Academy where his landscapes were much admired, and three of his works were exhibited at the Society of British Artists and two at the Royal Academy in the 1850s. x. He maintained a friendship with artist David Cox the elder throughout his life.

He died on 22 July 1861 leaving over £50,000 (£3,020,850 in 2017 money). He was buried on 26 July 1861 at Toxteth Park Cemetery.

== Legacy ==
- The North Shore or Estuary of the River Mersey is at the Walker Gallery in Liverpool.
- Children Playing at Jink-Stones
- The Butterfly Hunt

Several of his children and grandchildren became artists. Notably his son, Alfred William Hunt who is known for his watercolors and his granddaughter, Jessie Macgregor (-1919), who also has paintings in the Walker Gallery.
