= Margaret Raine Hunt =

Margaret Raine Hunt

Margaret Hunt (née Raine; 1831–1912) was a British novelist and translator of the tales of the Brothers Grimm.

== Life ==
Margaret Raine, was born in Durham, England, 1831. She was the daughter of James Raine and sister to James Raine the younger, she also wrote under the pseudonym Averil Beaumont. Her husband was the artist Alfred William Hunt. Her older daughter was the novelist Violet Hunt; her younger daughter Venetia Benson, née Hunt (1864–1946) married the designer William Arthur Smith Benson (1854–1924).

In the 1880s, a family friendship with Oscar Wilde was developed through her literary connections. In 1886, she was living in London. In addition to writing her novels, she translated a definitive edition of Grimm's Fairy Tales.

Hunt's grave and those of her husband and daughter are in Plot 56 at Brookwood Cemetery.

== Works ==
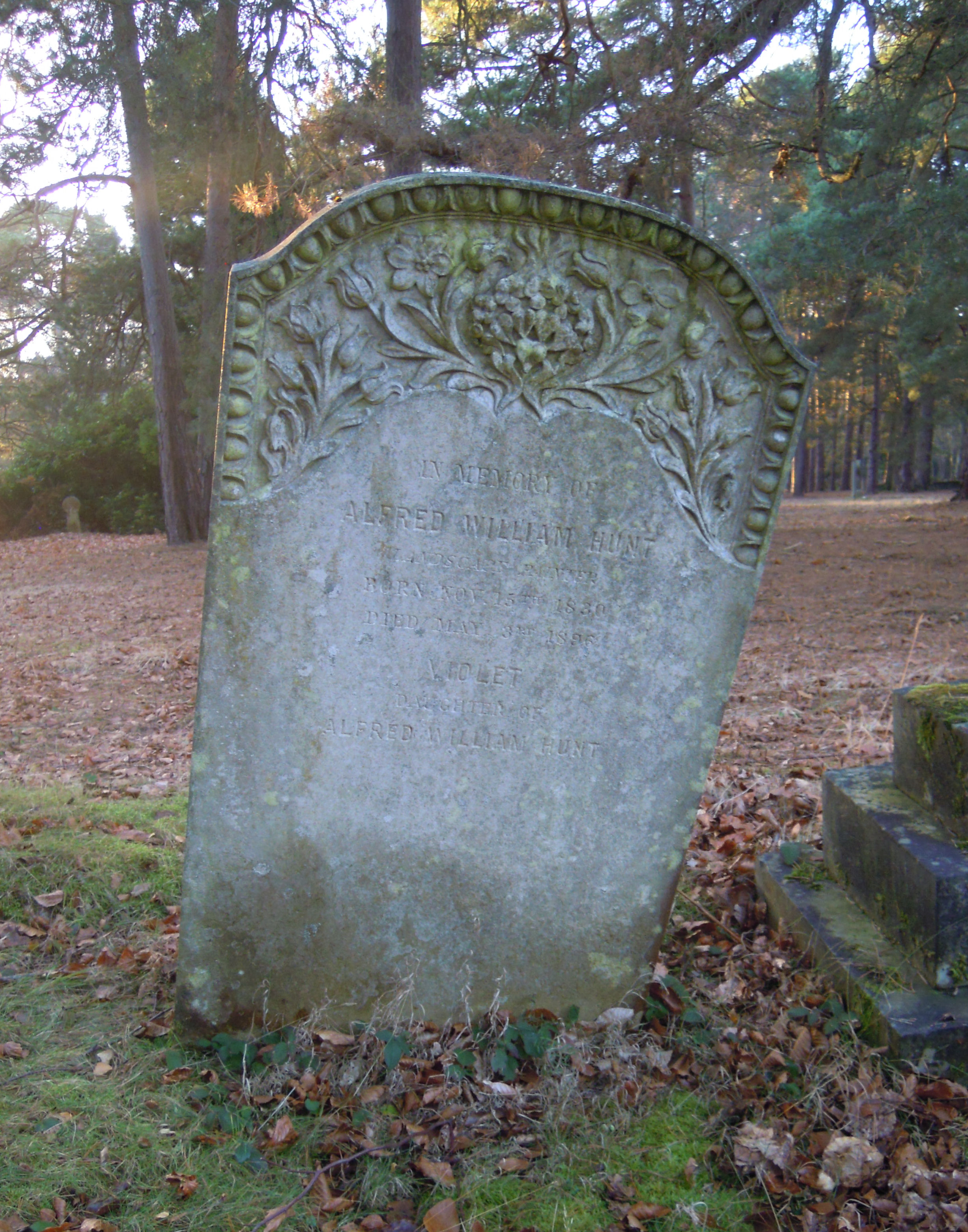
Hunt's grave in Brookwood Cemetery

The following list is a selection of novels written by Hunt,

- Under Seal of Confession (1874) (as Averil Beaumont)
- The Leaden Casket (1880)
- Thornicroft's Model (1881) (as Averil Beaumont)
- The Governess (1912) with Violet Hunt, preface by Ford Madox Brown.

In 1884 she produced the two volume Grimm's Household Tales (Bell & Sons, Covent Garden), with an introduction by Andrew Lang.
