= Lydia Foote =

English actress

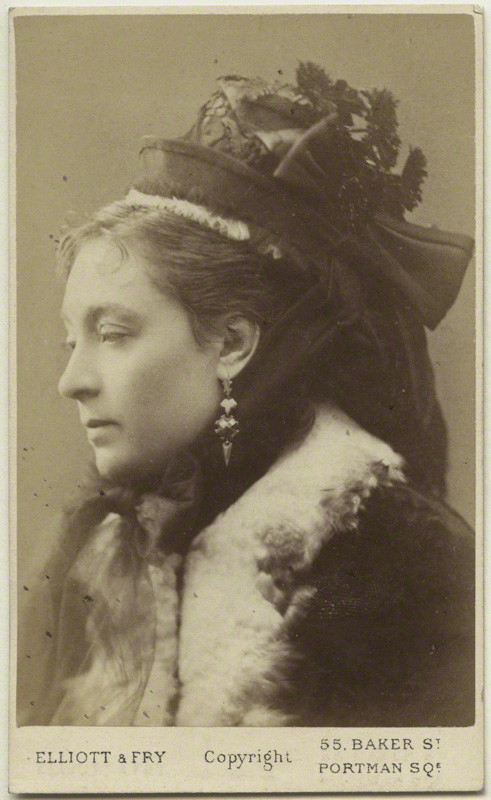
Lydia Foote in 1873

Lydia Foote, born Lydia Alice Legg (8 May 1843 – 30 May 1892), was an English actress. She played leading roles from the 1850s to the 1880s, including at the Lyceum Theatre, the Olympic Theatre, the Prince of Wales's Theatre and the Adelphi Theatre. She was known for her performances in such plays as The Frozen Deep (1866) and Caste (1867).

== Life ==
Foote was born in London to Arthur Wellington Legg, a coachbuilder, and Sarah Judith Legg (née Goward). Her maternal aunt was Mary Anne Keeley, a noted actress. Coming from an established and successful acting family Foote enjoyed a degree of respect that was generally not afforded to actresses of this era as their profession was seen as indicative of sexual promiscuity.

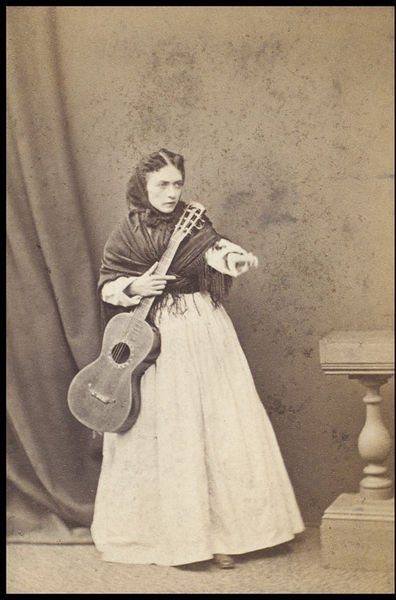
Foote in The Ticket-of-Leave Man

Foote played leading roles from the 1850s to the 1880s. She debuted in London at the Lyceum Theatre in 1852 in the juvenile role of Edward in A Chain of Events by Charles Mathews and Slingsby Lawrence. About 1859, she played Amanthis in The Child of Nature by Elizabeth Inchbald. In 1863–1866, after other performances in London, Manchester and elsewhere, she was engaged at the Olympic Theatre, where she first appeared in The Ticket-of-Leave Man as May Edwards. In that piece, Foote delivered a song that was published as "The Song that Lydia Foote Sang". In 1864 there, she created the role of Enid in Tom Taylor's adaptation of The Hidden Hand, and in the following year created another role, Miss Hargrave, in Taylor's Settling Day. She also played Maria in Twelfth Night. In 1866, she received warm reviews as Clara in Wilkie Collins's The Frozen Deep.

The Dictionary of National Biography refers to her "great triumph" as her performances as Esther in T. W. Robertson's Caste, at the Prince of Wales's Theatre in 1867. She continued to perform regularly in West End theatres, including in the roles of Lady Selina in How She Loves Him by Dion Boucicault and as Amanda in Robertson's Play (1868). In H. J. Byron's Blow for Blow, she played twin sisters, and she had the title role in his play Minnie. She also took the leading role in Robertson's Progress. She later performed many roles at the Adelphi Theatre, including Smike in a stage version of Nicholas Nickleby (1875). She originated the roles of Anna in The Danischeffs, adapted by Lord Newry (1877) and Midge in Boucicault's Rescued (1879), among others.

Foote died in Broadstairs from cancer in 1892 and was buried at Kensal Green cemetery.
