= Anna Brassey =

British traveller and writer

The Right Honourable The Lady Brassey
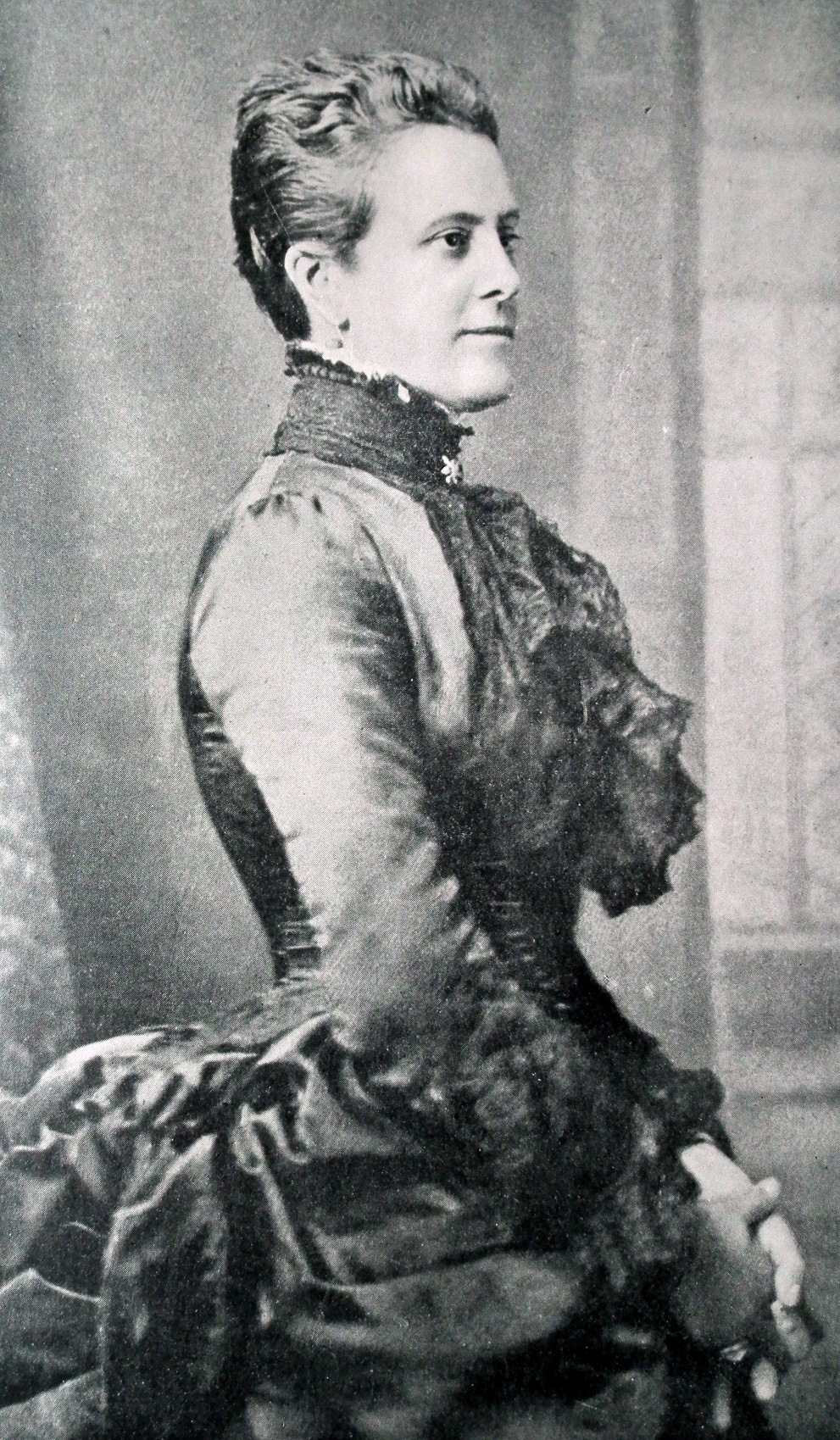
- Anna Brassey
- Born: Anna Allnutt; 7 October 1839; London, England
- Died: 14 September 1887 (aged 47); En route to Mauritius
- Resting place: Buried at sea
- Other name: Annie Allnutt
- Known for: Travel writing
- Title: Baroness Brassey
- Spouse: Thomas Brassey, 1st Earl Brassey (m. 1860)
- Children: Thomas Brassey, 2nd Earl Brassey; Lady Mabelle Brassey; Muriel Sackville, Countess De La Warr; Lady Constance Brassey; Marie Freeman-Thomas, Marchioness of Willingdon
- Parent(s): Mr and Mrs John Allnutt

Anna Brassey, Baroness Brassey (née Allnutt; 7 October 1839 – 14 September 1887) was an English traveller and writer. Her bestselling book A Voyage in the Sunbeam, our Home on the Ocean for Eleven Months (1878) describes a voyage around the world.

== Life ==
Annie Brassey was born Anna Allnutt in London in 1839 to John Allnutt. As a child, she faced serious health problems. In The Last Voyage, her husband recalled that Allnutt suffered from an inherited "weakness of the chest", apparently a form of chronic bronchitis. As a young woman, she also suffered severe burns when she stood too close to a fireplace and her skirt caught fire. It took six months for her to recover from them.

In 1860, she married the English Member of Parliament Thomas Brassey (knighted in 1881 and became Earl Brassey in 1886), with whom she lived near his Hastings constituency. The couple had five children together before they travelled aboard their luxury yacht Sunbeam. The yacht was said to have been named after their daughter – Constance Alberta – who was nicknamed Sunbeam; she died of scarlet fever, aged four, on 24 January 1873. The golden figurehead of the yacht depicting her is at the National Maritime Museum, Greenwich, London.

A Voyage in the Sunbeam, describing their journey round the world in 1876–1877 with a complement of 43, including family, friends and crew, ran through many English editions and was translated into at least five languages. Her accounts of later voyages include Sunshine and Storm in the East (1880); In the Trades, the Tropics, and the Roaring Forties (1885); and The Last Voyage (1889, published posthumously). She had published privately earlier works including A Flight of the Meteor, detailing two cruises in the Mediterranean on their earlier yacht Meteor and A Voyage in the Eothen a description of their travels to Canada and the United States in 1872. She was also involved with the publication of Colonel Henry Stuart-Wortley's 1882 Tahiti, a Series of Photographs.

In July 1881, King Kalākaua of Hawaii, who had been greatly pleased with her description of his kingdom, was entertained at Normanhurst Court, and invested Lady Brassey with the Royal Order of Kapiolani.

At home in England, she performed charitable work, largely for the St John Ambulance Association. Her collection of ethnographic and natural history material was shown in a museum at her husband's London house until it was moved to Hastings Museum in 1919. There are also several photograph albums and other ephemera held at Hastings Library. However, the vast majority of her photograph albums are now housed in the Huntington Library, San Marino, California. The collection of 70 albums, each of 72 to 80 thick board pages, contain works by Brassey and others she collected, including those of commercial photographers. Brassey herself was an accomplished photographer. She joined the Photographic Society of London (later the Royal Photographic Society) in 1873 and remained a member until her death, and she exhibited some of her work in its exhibitions in 1873 and 1886.

Lady Brassey's last voyage on the Sunbeam was to India and Australia, undertaken in November 1886 to improve her health. She travelled through Western Australia, visiting Albany, Chockerup Inn and other places, and her diary of the journey was published as The Last Voyage. On the way to Mauritius, she died of malaria on 14 September 1887, and was buried at sea.

== Works ==
- The Flight of the "Meteor", 1869–71 (Mann, Nephews) 1872
- A Cruise in the "Eothen", 1872 (Printed for private circulation, F. Platts) 1873
- A Voyage in the "Sunbeam", our home on the ocean for eleven months (Longmans, Green) 1878. In the United States: *Around the World in the Yacht 'Sunbeam', our home, etc. (Henry Holt) 1878
- Sunshine and Storm in the East, or Cruises to Cyprus and Constantinople (Longmans, Green) 1880
- In the Trades, the Tropics, & the Roaring Forties (Longmans, Green) 1885
- The Last Voyage, to India and Australia, in the "Sunbeam" (Longmans, Green) 1889
- Tahiti, a series of photographs taken by Colonel Stuart-Wartley, with letterpress by Lady Brassey (Sampson Low, Marston, Searle, & Rivington) 1882
- "St. John Ambulance Association: its Work and Objects" (supplement to the Club and Institute Journal) 23 October 1885
Portrait by Francis Grant, 1864

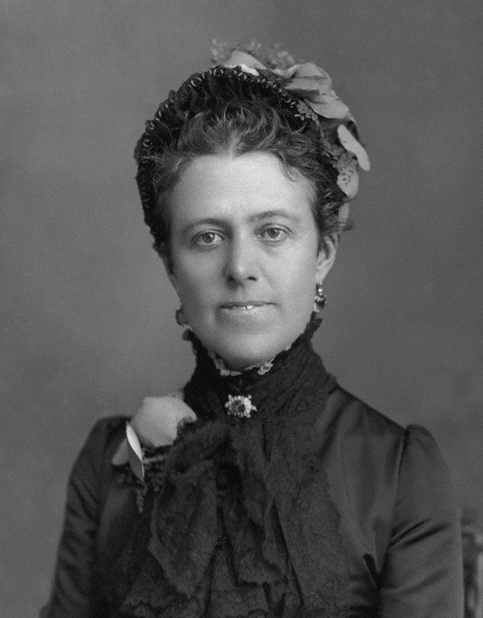

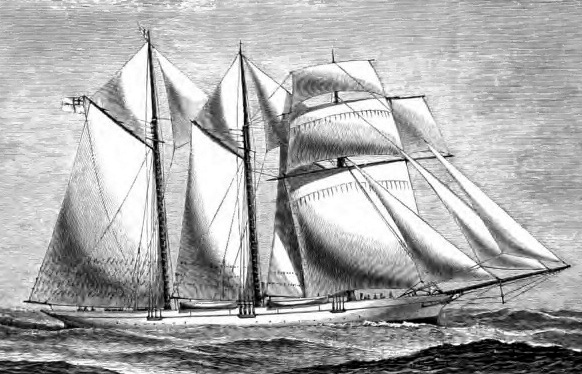
Sunbeam under full sail

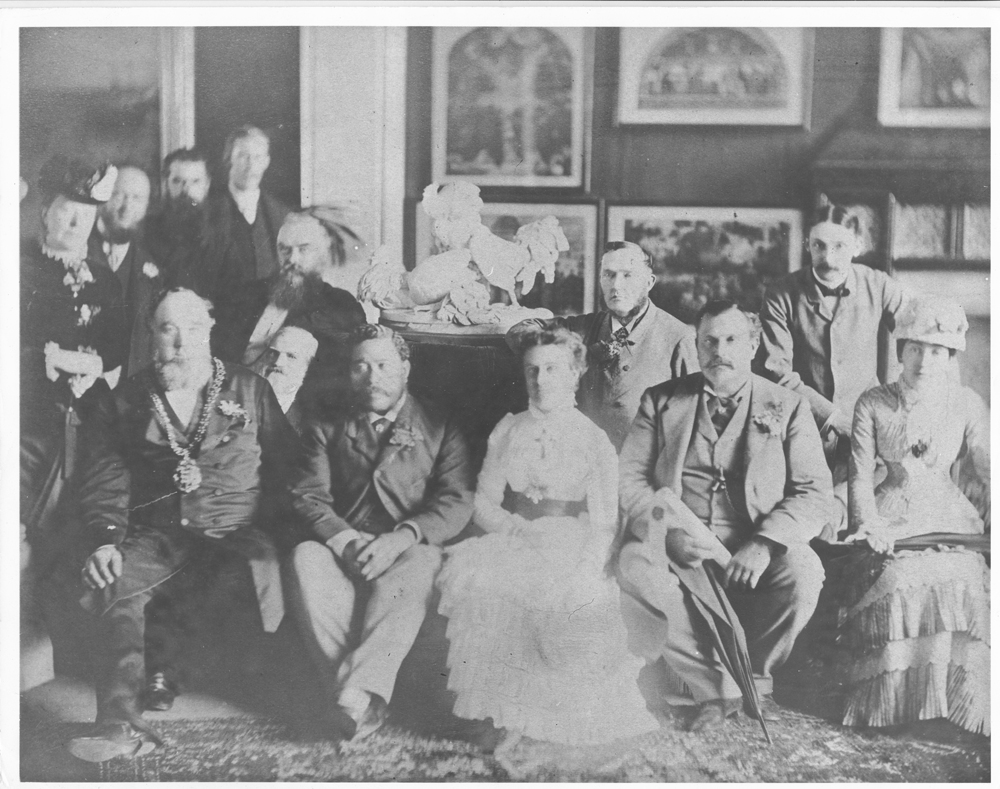
Lord Brassey and his wife entertaining King Kalākaua of Hawaii, 1881

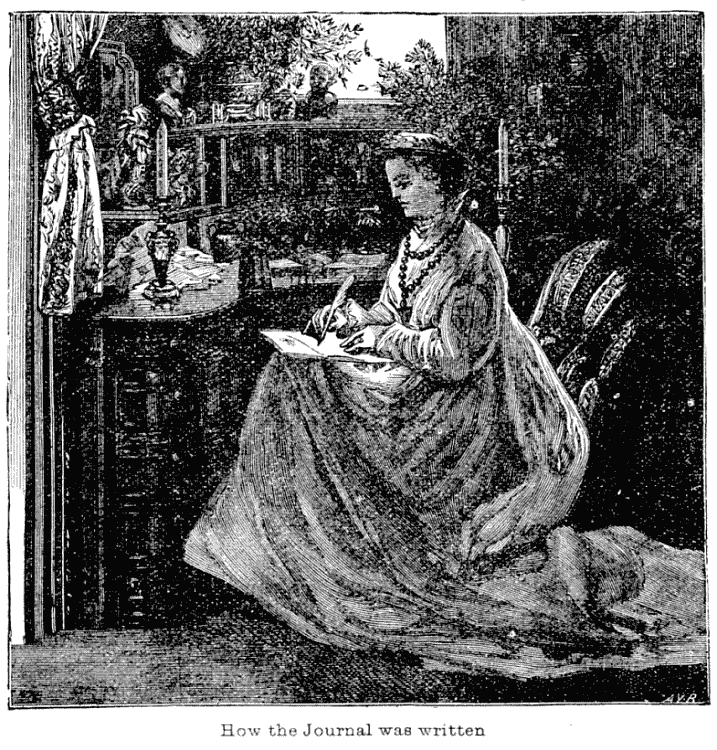
From A Voyage in the Sunbeam

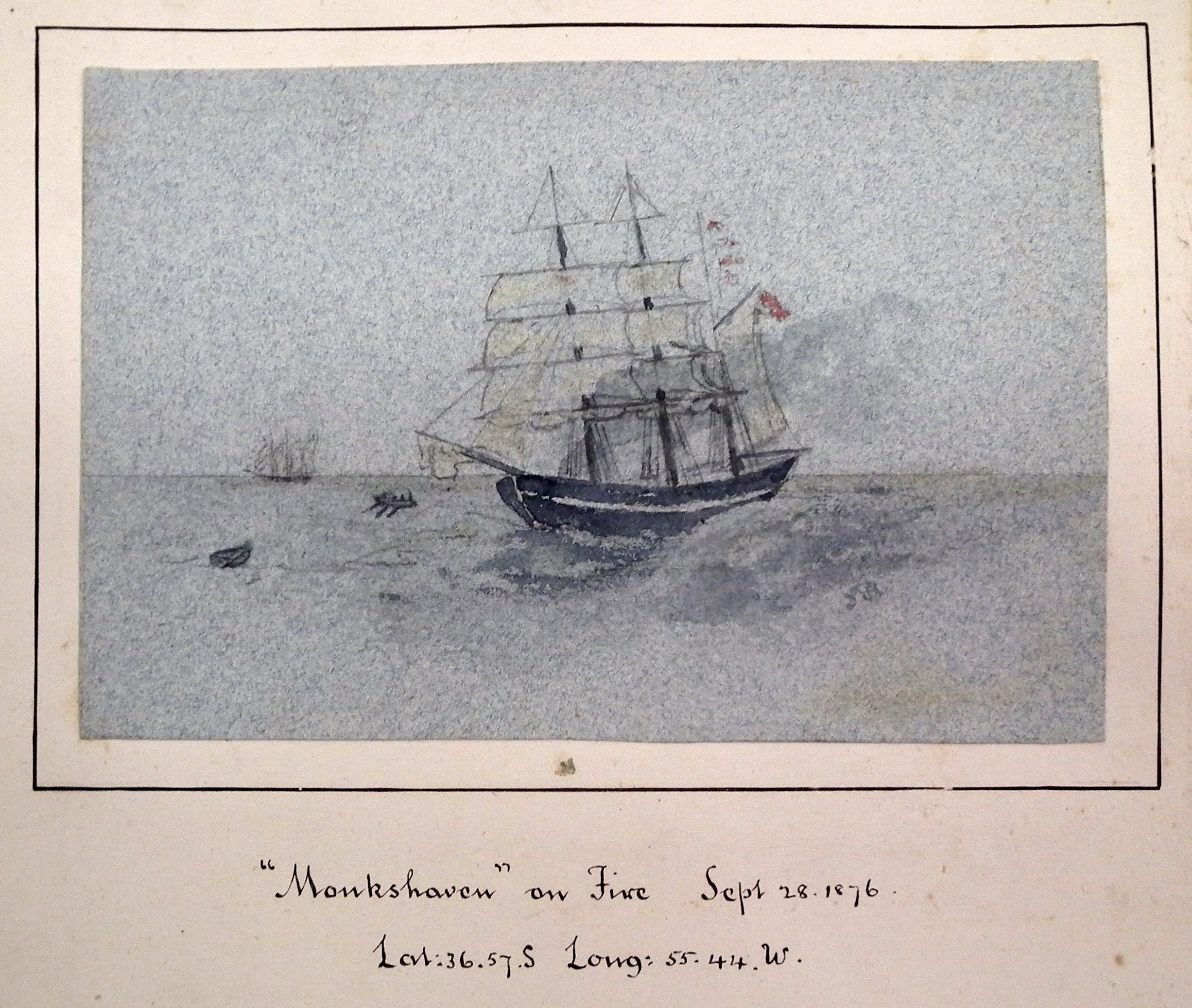
Monkshaven on fire, possible sketch by Anna Brassey 28 September 1876

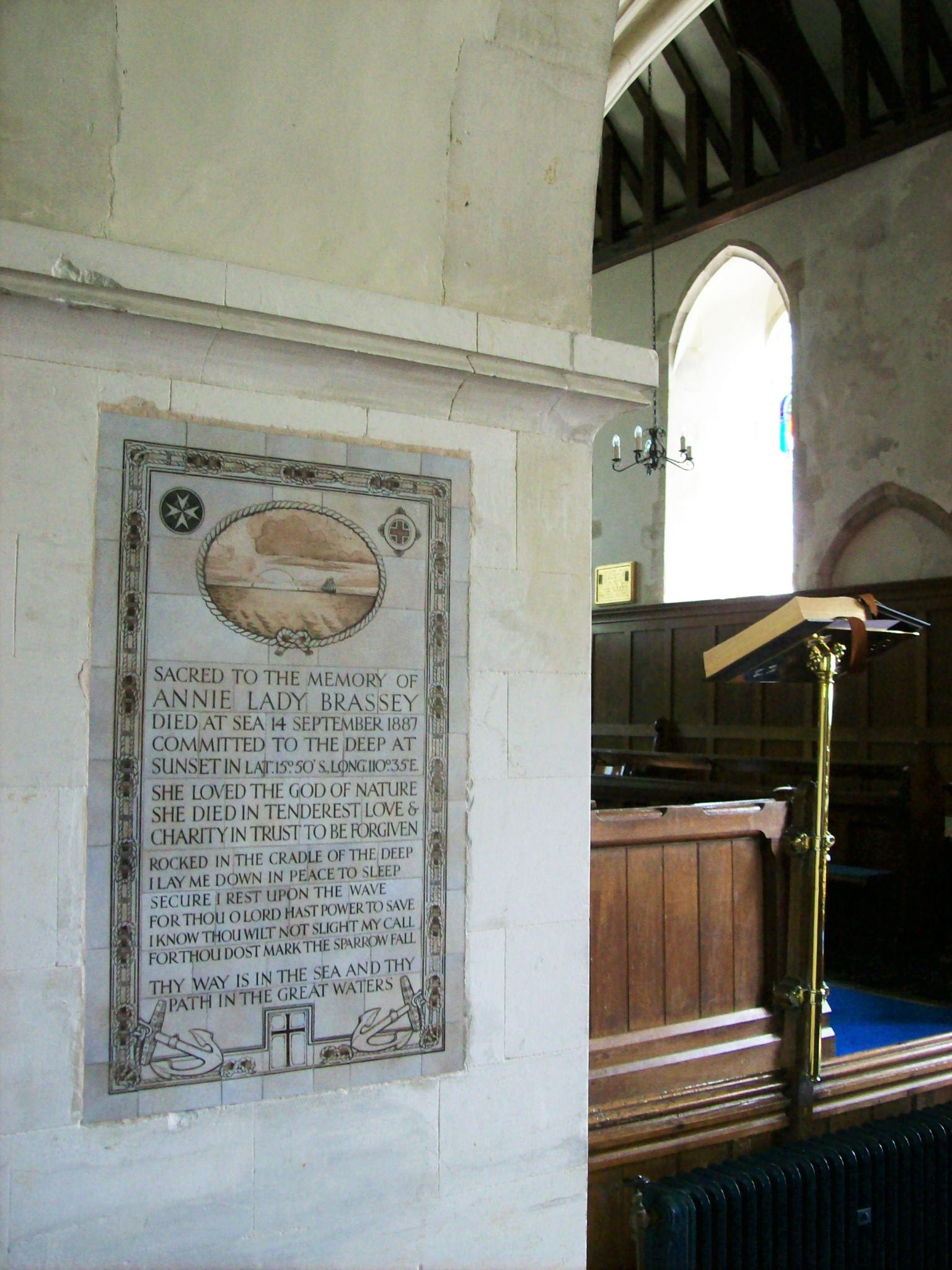
Memorial plaque to Brassey in Catsfield church

== Sources ==
- Brassey [née Allnutt], Anna [Annie], Lady Brassey (1839–1887), entry in the Oxford Dictionary of National Biography
