= Louisa Starr =

British painter (1845–1909)

Louisa Starr Canziani
- Louisa Starr c. 1900
- Born: Louisa Starr; 1845; London, United Kingdom
- Died: 25 May 1909 (aged 63–64) 25 May 1909; London, United Kingdom
- Known for: Painting
- Spouse: Enrico Canziani

Louisa Starr, later Louisa Canziani (1845 – 25 May 1909) was a British painter.

== Biography ==
Starr was born in London in 1845. Her parents were Anna (born ) Cowan and Henry Starr. They were cousins of Italian heritage but they had been born in London and America respectively. They lived on Russell Square and she became a copyist at the British Museum. Studying at the Royal Academy Schools, she showed her first work there in 1866 and by 1876 showed 17 paintings. She won a gold medal at the Royal Academy for history painting in December 1867. She was the first woman to do so and was followed by Jessie Macgregor's gold medal in 1871, but the next woman to do so was not until 1909.

She married the Italian civil engineer Enrico Canziani (1848–1931) and thereafter signed her works with her married name. Her daughter Estella Canziani also became an artist.

She exhibited her work at the Palace of Fine Arts at the 1893 World's Columbian Exposition in Chicago, Illinois.

Her painting Sintram and his mother was included in the 1905 book Women Painters of the World.

Starr died in London on 25 May 1909 and was buried in the Starr family grave (plot no.19975) on the western side of Highgate Cemetery near the grave of Elizabeth Siddal.

== Gallery ==
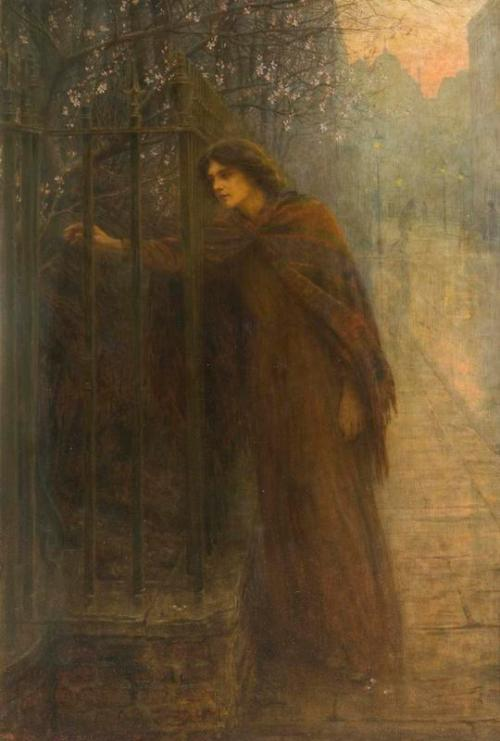
Cold Spring - The Alien (1906; Aberdeen Art Gallery)

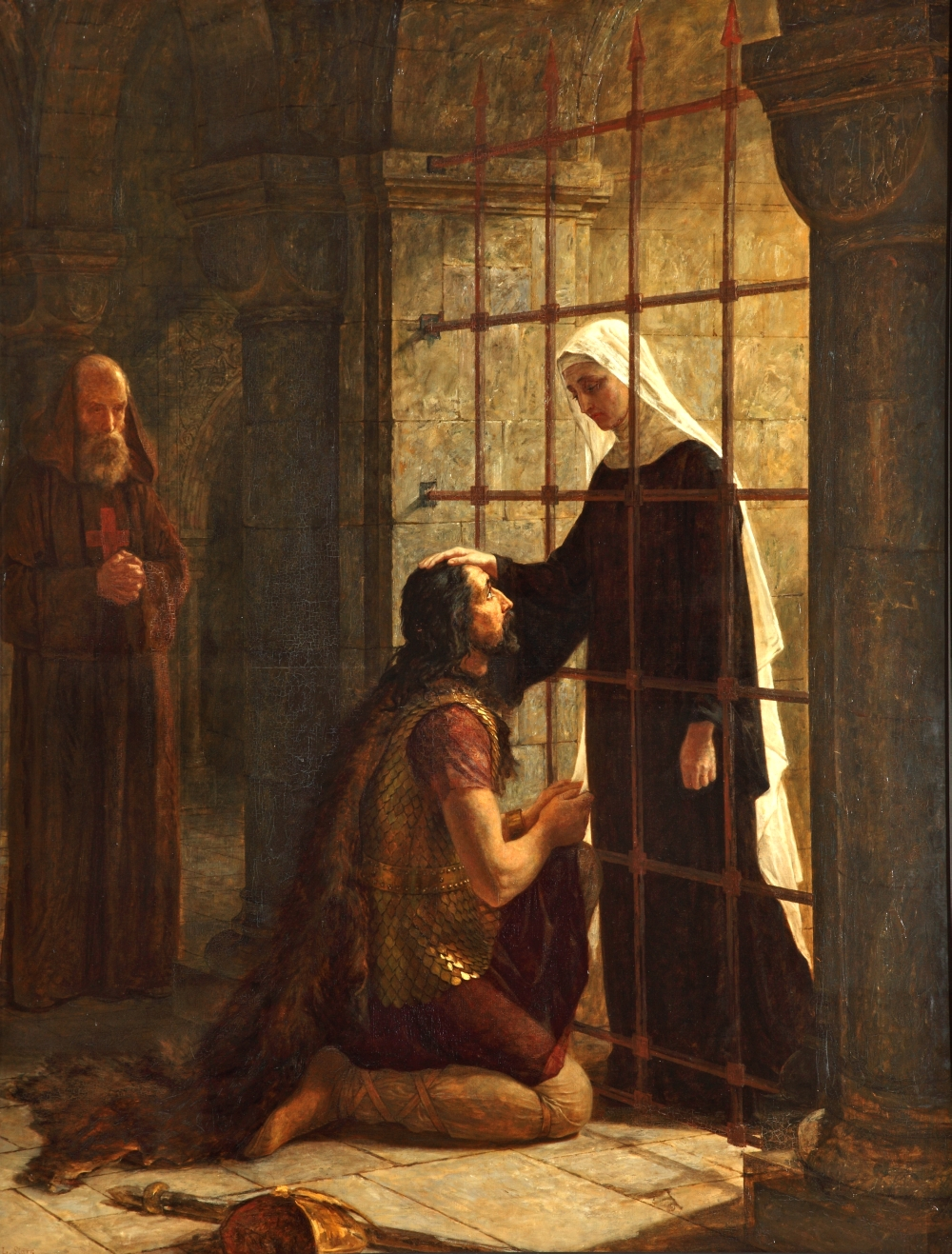
Sintram and his Mother, from a story by De la Motte Fouqué

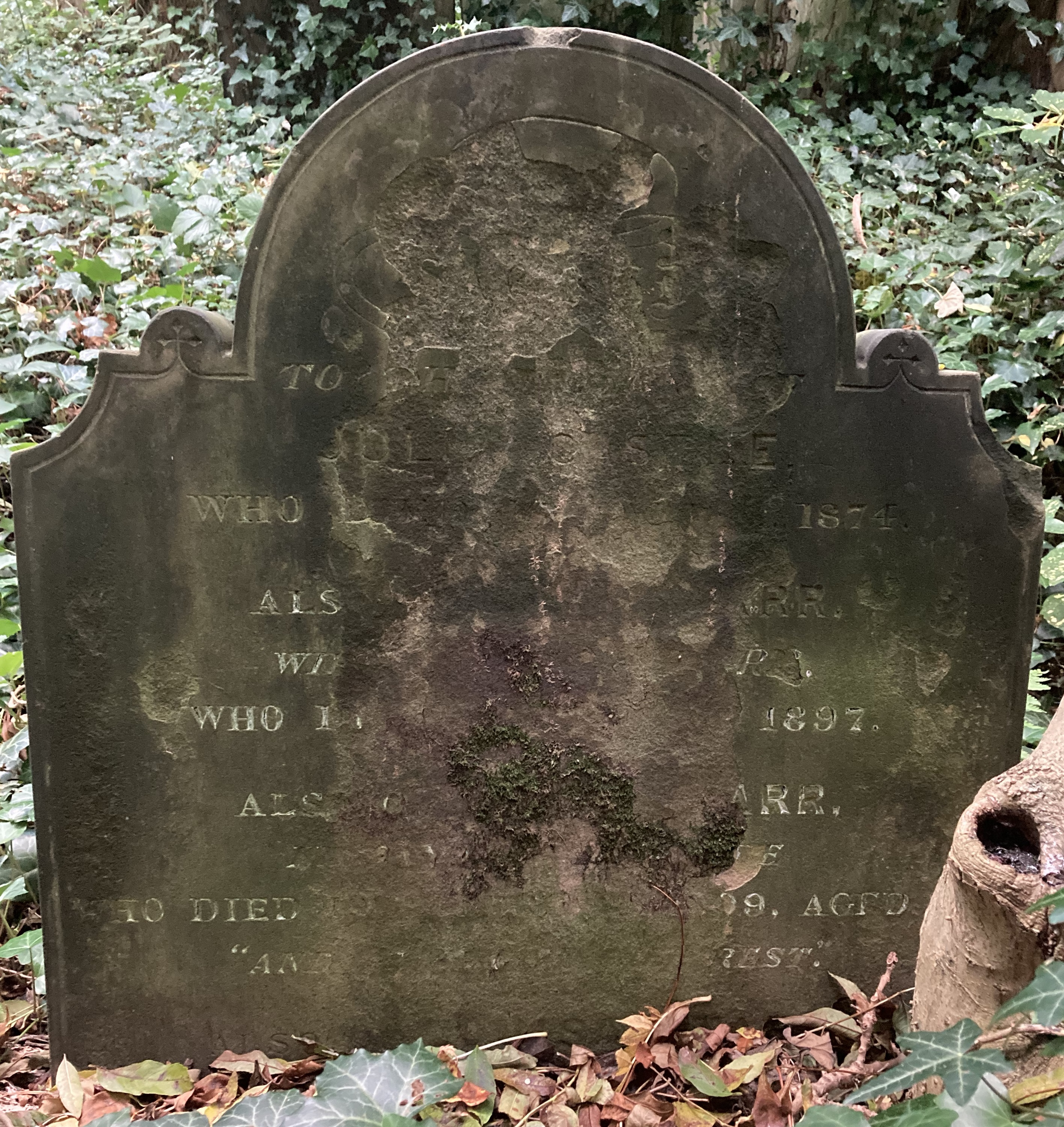
Grave of Louisa Starr in Highgate Cemetery
