= Jessie Macgregor =

British painter

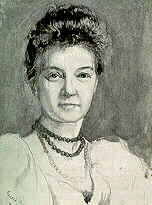
- Self-portrait
- Born: 1847
- Died: 1919 (aged 71–72); Liverpool, United Kingdom
- Known for: Painting

Jessie Macgregor (1847–1919) was a British painter.

Macgregor first learned drawing at the drawing academy in Liverpool run by her grandfather Andrew Hunt. Her parents went to live in London and she began to study painting there, becoming a pupil at the Royal Academy Schools where her teachers were Lord Leighton, P. H. Calderon, R.A., and John Pettie, R.A.

She won a gold medal at the Royal Academy for history painting in December 1871. She was the second woman after Louisa Starr's gold medal in 1867, and the last woman to do so until 1909. She beat Julia Cecilia Smith and Julia Bracewell Folkard. It was noted how these three women's achievements revealed the silliness of the rules that excluded women from becoming full members of the Royal Academy.

Macgregor exhibited her work at the Palace of Fine Arts at the 1893's World's Columbian Exposition in Chicago, Illinois.

Her painting In the Reign of Terror (1891; Walker Art Gallery, Liverpool) was included in the 1905 book Women Painters of the World.

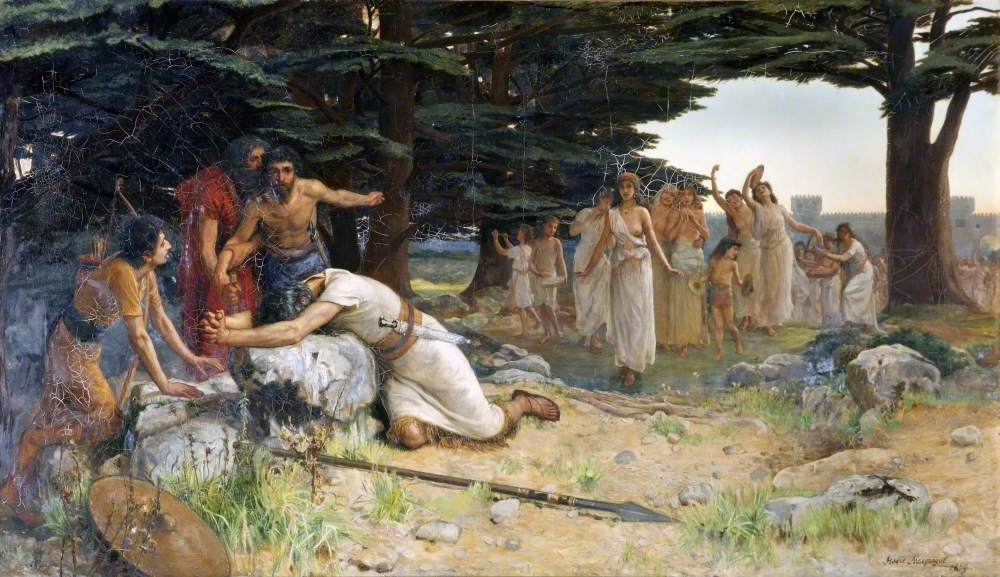
Jephthah, 1889
