= Julia Bracewell Folkard =

British painter

- Born: 1849
- Died: 1933 (aged 83–84)

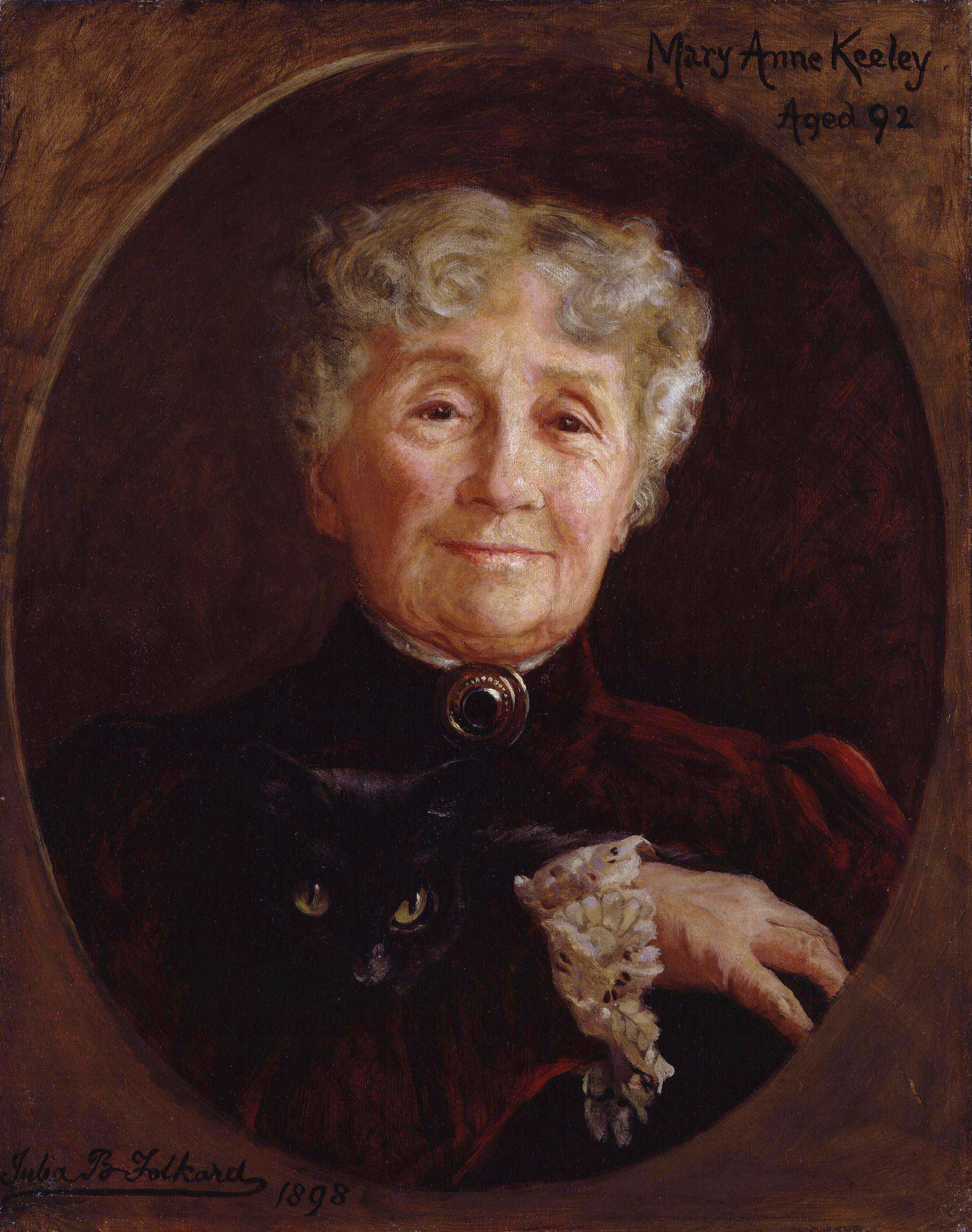
Portrait of Mary Ann Keeley (née Goward)

Julia Bracewell Folkard (1849–1933) was a British painter.

== Life ==
She was born in 1849 and she was a student at the Royal Academy. She repaid this 1871 when she shared a silver medal with Julia Cecilia Smith for their paintings. The gold medal that year was taken by Jessie MacGregor. It was noted how these three women revealed the silliness of the rules that excluded women from becoming full members of the Royal Academy.

She became a portrait and genre painter who was a frequent exhibitor at the Royal Academy and Suffolk Street from 1872. Her painting I Showed Her the Ring and Implored Her to Marry was included in the 1905 book Women Painters of the World. Folkard died in Paris.

Bracewell's painting of Mary Anne Keeley is in the National Portrait Gallery in London.
